= The Michael Coren Show =

Canadian public affairs panel show

The Michael Coren Show (originally Michael Coren Live, until it ceased being a live-to-air broadcast) is an hour-long Canadian public affairs panel show hosted by Michael Coren which dealt with current events, social issues as well as arts and culture. It aired weeknights on the Crossroads Television System, a multi-faith television network with affiliates in Ontario and Alberta. The show aired on CTS from 1999 until June 30, 2011, when Coren left CTS to join the Sun News Network to host The Arena with Michael Coren.

The show typically featured Coren and up to four guests. Weekly regulars on the panel included outspoken freelance writer David Menzies, liberal Muslim Tarek Fatah, journalist and broadcaster Marianne Meed Ward, new media personality Andrew Lawton, CUPE leader Sid Ryan, legal agent and socialist Harry Kopyto and high-profile guests, including prominent politicians, journalists and cultural figures such as Mohamed Elmasry, David Orchard, Marva Wisdom, and Bert Archer. Topics of discussion regularly included provincial and federal and international politics, social issues, religion and healthcare as well as general news and cultural subjects. The show was known for debate on controversial issues (for example, Coren has hosted numerous shows on the Israeli–Palestinian conflict and Islamic extremism versus Islam, with guests who have strong stances on both sides of these issues).

Programs on the Middle East have proven contentious in the past with leaders of both the B'nai Brith and Canadian Islamic Congress facing recriminations for controversial remarks. In the aftermath of program aired on October 19, 2004, Adam Aptowitzer, Ontario chairman of the B'nai Brith Institute for International Affairs, was forced to resign his position after arguing that Israel had used terror against Palestinians legitimately stating that "When Israel uses terror ... to destroy a home and convince people ... to be terrified of what the possible consequences are, I'd say that's an acceptable use to terrify somebody." On the same broadcast Elmasry, president of the Canadian Islamic Congress, asserted that all adult Israelis are legitimate targets of attack as a consequence of their service in the Israel Defense Forces. Elmasry apologized for his comments and offered to resign—his resignation was rejected by the CIC.

The Michael Coren Show was also the name of Coren's Sunday evening radio program on CFRB and has also been the name of past radio shows he has hosted on various radio stations.

== See also ==
- Lists of Canadian television series
