= Mohamed Elmasry =

Canadian academic and Imam

- Born: December 24, 1943 (age 82); Cairo, Egypt
- Education: Cairo University; University of Ottawa
- Occupations: professor, religious leader

Mohamed Elmasry (Arabic: محمد المصري; born December 24, 1943) is a Canadian engineering professor, imam, and Muslim community leader.

== Biography ==
He was born in Cairo, Egypt and received his Bachelor of Science in 1965 from Cairo University. He continued his studies in Canada earning masters and doctorate degrees in electrical engineering from the University of Ottawa in 1970 and 1974. He has worked in the area of digital integrated microchip design for over four decades.

From 1965 to 1968, Elmasry worked for Cairo University and from 1972 to 1974 for Bell-Northern Research in Ottawa, Ontario, Canada. Since 1974, he has been with the Department of Electrical and Computer Engineering at the University of Waterloo in Ontario where he is a founding Director of the VLSI (Microchip) Research Group.

As a spokesperson for Muslim causes through the Canadian Islamic Congress, he has been a regular contributor to The Globe and Mail. His remarks, especially those concerning the Israeli–Palestinian conflict, have drawn significant attention in the Canadian media. He has accused some of his opponents of being anti-Islam.

Elmasry has authored and co-authored more than 500 research papers and 16 books on integrated circuit design and design automation, as well as having several patents to his credit. He has edited the following books for the Institute of Electrical and Electronics Engineers: Digital MOS Integrated Circuits (1981); Digital VLSI Systems (1985), Digital MOS Integrated Circuits II (1991) and Analysis and Design of BiCMOS Integrated Circuits (1993).

== Appearance on The Michael Coren Show ==
Asked by Michael Coren in an interview on October 19, 2004 if "...everyone in Israel, irrespective of gender, over the age of 18 is a valid [military] target?", CIC President Mohamed Elmasry responded, "Yes, I would say."

Elmasry later apologized for his remarks, calling them his "biggest mistake" in 30 years of public life and offered his resignation, which was not accepted by the CIC's board.

The Elmasry affair led to criticisms that the media focussed entirely on the comments of the CIC president while neglecting controversial comments made on the same program by a B'nai Brith official, Adam Aptowitzer, who stated that "When Israel uses terror... to destroy a home and convince people... to be terrified of what the possible consequences are, I'd say that's an acceptable use to terrify somebody." The remarks only received attention several weeks after the broadcast, and after Elmasry's apology and proffered resignation, when a press release by the Canadian Arab Federation highlighted them. Following the CAF press release, Aptowitzer retracted his comments and resigned his position with the B'nai Brith. Toronto Star city editor John Ferri told the Toronto Star's ombud, Don Sellar, "we all had egg on our faces...[i]t was embarrassing for every paper in the city not to get the whole story from the outset."

In a letter to the Toronto Star following Sellar's column, Elmasary complained about the affair:

Canadian news media - including the Star - launched a relentless and unfair attack against the Canadian Islamic Congress (CIC) and me while covering up for weeks the outrageous statements made on the same show by Adam Aptowitzer, then the Ontario chairman of the B'nai Brith Institute of International Affairs. While never referring to Aptowitzer's statements, the media used news stories, editorials, op-ed pieces, columns, photos, front-page coverage, cartoons, and radio and television commentaries to paint a negative picture of CIC and myself which seriously distorts and falsifies the truth. It was widely reported, for example, that "Elmasry said all Israelis over 18 were legitimate targets for suicide bombers." This is totally false.

The media never questioned the completeness or the accuracy of the radio show transcript that was given to them. Instead, they totally and completely relied on the heavily selective one provided to them, which was one-sided and referred only to my remarks, but not to those by Aptowitzer.

Elmasry also criticized Canadian Jewish groups over this incident. In an article entitled "When Jews Target a Canadian Muslim", Elmasry accused the Canadian Jewish Congress (CJC) and Bnai Brith Canada of "putting pressure on my university to fire me" and that his words were "mis-represented to the public exactly as the CJC wished". He also stated that "a Toronto Jewish businessman had threatened to withdraw his financial support for a chair of Jewish studies."

He also criticized the 2004 bombings of hotels in Taba, Egypt on the grounds that some of the victims there were not Israelis. These remarks prompted harshly-worded responses from representatives of the Canadian Jewish Congress and several prominent Canadian Muslims. At first, Elmasry defended his remarks by insisting that he was merely sharing the standard Palestinian point of view. This led to further charges from his critics, who accused him of using the Palestinians as a scapegoat. In a letter to the Toronto Star, he denied having said what he was reported to have said.

== Relationship with Tarek Fatah ==
Regarding the October 2004 controversy involving Elmasry, Tarek Fatah, a founder of the Muslim Canadian Congress, had stated that "...to believe all Israelis are targets is the height of hypocrisy."

Fatah also stated that: "In refusing to step aside, Elmasry and the CIC have demonstrated the authoritarian and dictatorial nature of their structure.[...] They purport to speak for Canada's 600,000 Muslims, but are not accountable or answerable to them.[...] We demand he [Elmasry] not[...] masquerade as leader of the community."

Regarding Elmasry's statements, Fatah wrote that "Elmasry accused his Muslim opponents of being traitors to their faith—an allegation that is read as a charge of apostasy, with all its ugly consequences" and that "It is especially sad that Mohamed Elmasry and his allies have chosen the holy month of Ramadan to launch their broadside on progressive Muslims."

In June 2006, Elmasry, named four public figures – Tarek Fatah among them – of taking every opportunity to bad-mouth Islam. Specifically, Elmasry stated that Fatah is "well known in Canada for smearing Islam and bashing Muslims". Fatah blasted Elmasry, stating that "[t]his is a classic threat to label anyone as an apostate and then marginalize them,[...] And this is what Mr. Elmasry has done by listing me as the top anti-Islam Muslim." Fatah stated that he views the label from Elmasry as tantamount to a death sentence. However, some Islamic scholars disagreed with Fatah's characterization of Elmasry's comments. Leonard Librande, professor of religion at Carleton University, told CTV News that "There's nothing particularly Islamic in this... There are differences of opinion frequently in the community. It doesn't mean somebody is going to kill you."

However, Fatah has argued that "in the Muslim world[...] allegations of apostasy are used to silence critics and human rights workers" and that "Some interpretations of Sharia call for apostates to be killed. Such views have forced many Muslims to flee their countries of birth and take refuge in tolerant Western nations such as Canada. To now find ourselves harassed in Canada by some Muslims here is alarming and ironic."

== Opinions and public statements ==
=== War against terror ===
Elmasry has asserted that the war against terror is actually being used to oppress Muslims as a whole saying that:

Right wing Canadian politicians and their parties consider the "war against terror" to mean the same as "war against Muslims."

On the Bush Administration's intentions in the Middle East, in particular towards Iran, he has argued that:

Mr. Bush has started a new and ugly cold war and he clearly intends to transform it into a hot one, sooner rather than later; the media and political hype will translate into real aggression, bringing death, misery and destruction to yet another Middle East state. The evil character of human greed and power-lust is about to raise its ugly specter once again and subjugate a weaker nation that refuses to toe the American line.

Regarding a potential American attack on Iran, Elmasry has written that "It is all part of a long-planned Bush and Co. agenda and that is why you won't find a single good word in the American mainstream media about Iran—none, nil, zero." In addition, Elmasry added that "the doctrine of colonization: looting other people's wealth and enslaving them, while killing outright those who resist[...] seems to be the dominant doctrine in Washington today" and that "Americans are busy preparing to attack yet another country, spreading more looting, more death, more suffering, and more destruction next door in Iran."

Elmasry has stated his opposition to Osama bin Laden calling him "a lunatic, a fanatic" and accusing him and his lieutenants of "endangering the well-being, even the lives of many Muslims who are living in the West" and whose "religious rhetoric will probably feed into anti-Islam sentiments that already existed before Sept. 11 and have been on the rise since Sept. 11". Of bin Laden and his associated, Elmasry says "They have no religious authority."

=== Hezbollah ===
Elmasry has written that Hezbollah "is actually a legitimate Lebanese Shi'a Islam political party organized around a variety of roles and functions, just as are many other political parties. And, not unlike some other parties, it developed a national military resistance wing, created solely in response to Israel's occupation of Southern Lebanon."

During the 2006 conflict between Israel and Hezbollah, the Canadian Islamic Congress and the Canadian Arab Federation urged the Canadian government to take Hezbollah and Hamas off its list of designated terrorist organizations. Elmasry wrote that the Canadian government should "review its 2002 decision to place Hezbollah and Hamas on its list of banned alleged terrorist organizations" because doing so "is an unconscionable act of hypocrisy and a mockery of justice" since Canada has not placed Israel on the same list. Elmasry also stated that the decision to place Hezbollah and Hamas on this list was "dictated by special interest groups with agendas that are contrary to peace with justice".

=== Islamophobia ===
Elmasry has been outspoken in opposition to Islamophobia stating that "Today's Islamophobia and yesterday's anti-Semitism are starkly similar" and expressing fear that at the parallels between historic anti-Semitism in Europe and modern anti-Muslim sentiment in the West. "Today, Canadian Muslims are collectively judged as guilty by association for every crime committed by Muslim individuals, organizations and states, no matter how obviously atypical, abnormal or extremist they are. They are labelled Islamists, fundamentalists, Jihadists, etc." wrote Elmasry in a letter to the National Post analogizing the current situation to the history of anti-Semitism where "European Jews were found guilty-by-association of many crimes, from killing the Son of God to any professional misconduct, beginning with the local Jewish doctor". He argued that the modern world should draw lessons from the past and work to halt the spread of anti-Muslim sentiment lest it establish the same groundwork for anti-Muslim violence the way that centuries of anti-Semitism laid the groundwork for violence against Jews.

=== Multiculturalism ===
In 2002, Elmasry denounced an email from the Khalid Bin Al-Walid Mosque that urged followers not to wish anyone a "Merry Christmas" asserting that this was tantamount to congratulating someone for murder and adultery. "It is a ridiculous statement and doesn't follow Islamic teaching. Whoever says this is saying it out of ignorance of his or her own religion", said Elmasry to the National Post and argued that extending Christmas greetings was the polite and neighbourly thing to do. He also said that Islam allows followers to marry Christians or Jews and that his own family is multi-faith. "My kids have uncles and aunts who are Christian and we wish them Happy Christmas and they also wish us Happy Eid."

Elmasry says he and the CIC support "smart integration where Muslims can practise their religion but can also be involved in advancing the well-being of their home country, which is Canada".

=== Sharia tribunals ===
In 2005, the Canadian Islamic Congress supported recommendations by Marion Boyd that the government of Ontario permit sharia tribunals to which Muslims could voluntarily submit civil disputes and whose findings would then have legal weight under the Arbitration Act. The proposal was opposed by the Muslim Canadian Congress, the Canadian Council of Muslim Women, and non-Muslim women's groups. The provincial government ended up rejecting the proposal and scrapping existing religious arbitration tribunals for Jews and Christians in the process.

Regarding the opposition of moderate Muslims to the introduction of Sharia tribunals in Canada, Elmasry wrote that Canadian Muslims should not "make a cause of publicly deriding their religion, badmouthing the Prophet, ridiculing the Qur'an and mounting uninformed crusades to smear their Islamic Law, the Shariah".

The Muslim Canadian Congress demanded that the CIC apologize for "false" accusations that those who criticize sharia are "smearing Islam, ridiculing the Koran [and] badmouthing Muhammad". The MCC stated that Elmasry accused the group of blasphemy, a crime that carries the death sentence in several Islamic countries. The MCC wrote,

Your [Elmasry's] false and utterly irresponsible accusations of blasphemy have exposed these active, dynamic and prominent members of the Canadian Muslim community and their families to enormously dangerous consequences. ... you [Elmasry] have defamed their good reputation and exposed them to ridicule and hatred within their own communities in Canada.

Some MCC members also expressed concern they will be arrested if they travel to certain Islamic countries.

Elmasry responded by stating that Islam has no punishment for denouncing the religion, its holy book, or Muhammad, and he dismissed as "nonsense" the notion that his words could be construed as a death sentence.

=== Danish Muhammed cartoons ===
Elmasry urged a moderate response to Danish cartoons of the Islamic prophet Muhammad published in 2005. Anger at the depictions resulted in violent rallies and attacks on Danish institutions in Europe and the Muslim world. Elmasry urged Canadian Muslims to have a "controlled and calm" response consisting of writing letters to the editor and the Danish government. He also urged Muslims to engage in outreach by inviting non-Muslims into their homes and have open houses in mosques. He discouraged attendance at demonstrations saying,

During demonstrations, you don't have control of who will do what. Opposing sides who are anti-Muslim or supporters of freedom of expression could show up and a shouting match can turn violent. Instead, we've encouraged a more proactive approach to plead with the government to recognize anti-Islam the way it does anti-Semitism.

=== Claim that Old Testament teaches violence ===
Commenting in June 2006 on the decision of United Church, in Toronto, Ontario, Canada, to reissue a motion to divest in Israeli companies, Elmasry stated:

The move of the Toronto's United Church is a moral one. But is it true to its Holy Book; the New Testament as much as Israel's campaign of death, destruction and misery against the Palestinians under its occupation is true to its Holy Book; the Old Testament? [...] It seems that many political leaders in the Christian West are not living the teaching of their Holy Book while Israel is living its own.

Elmasry supported this view by citing a 1953 book by French pacifist Jean Lasserre, La Guerre et L'Evangile. Drawing on Lasserre's view that by and large, "the Old Testament ignores that respect for human life, that unconditional love, that non-violence, which [is] the general climate of the New Testament."

Previously, he had stated that "very few people would sanely suggest that the Torah [which is part of the Old Testament] sanctions violence. The reason of course is that these verses and others much like them are subject to various interpretation and contextual assumptions."

==== Criticism ====
An article in the Arab American News criticized Elmasry, stating that:

His next gaffe [the first being the October 2004 controversy] was the declaration that Israel's cruelty could be explained by the fact that the Old Testament is full of justification of bloody deeds by the ancient Hebrews. The inescapable corollary is that all Jews are cruel. Of course, his remarks have several flaws. Even if, for the moment, we grant the characterization of the Old Testament, it does not follow that all who claim to follow it see it that way and act accordingly. Second, a more realistic evaluation of these scriptures would recognize that they contain the work of many authors with different views produced over many centuries, with later works often more sophisticated. Amos, who declares, "Let justice flow down like the waters and righteousness like an ever-flowing stream," can hardly be characterized as bloodthirsty. Finally, Elmasry's take on the Old Testament is un-Islamic. The Quran identifies some of the patriarchs in the Jewish scriptures as prophets, and it speaks respectfully of Jews and Christians as "people of the book".

Bnai Brith Canada sharply criticized Elmasry, stating in a press release that Elmasry's "thesis that the Old Testament is the root cause of all hatred and violence in the world" is an "attack on the core of Judaism".

=== The Canadian Jewish community ===
In an article written in June 2007, Elmasry criticised Canadian Jewish intellectuals for, in his opinion, moving to the right of the political spectrum. Elmasry wrote that "social justice once had staunch friends among Canadian Jews", citing in particular David Lewis, but argued that today "many Canadian Jewish intellectuals are assaulting Canada's policies regarding multiculturalism, immigration, and what they consider federal 'giving in' to natives' land claims. They are no longer speaking out against the deterioration of civil liberties in this country" and that "their political agenda has moved closer and closer to that of the far right."

In an article written in the National Post, Ezra Levant, the publisher of the now-defunct Western Standard accused Elmasry of hostility towards Jews. Levant cited the Canadian Association of Journalists meeting in Halifax in May 2005 in which he sat on a panel with Elmasry. During the meeting, Levant claims Elmasry engaged in "a lengthy rant against the 'zhoos' who control the media, the 'zhoos' who are 'on top' of the world and keep the Muslims on 'the bottom', and about how my own comments were suspect because I, too, was a 'zhoo.'"

In response to accusations of anti-Semitism, Elmasry has argued that his organization the CIC "was the first non-Jewish Canadian NGO to denounce anti-Semitic incidents committed against several Montreal Jewish institutions".

=== Israel and the Palestinians ===
Elmasry has referred to Israel as "Israel and apartheid" and has praised Israeli activist Uri Davis because he has "worked to expose the real truth behind Israel's so-called 'democracy'". Elmasry has also stated Uri Davis work makes it clear "to any thinking person that Israel and apartheid and Apartheid South Africa are remarkably similar". Elmarsy has also called for Britain to apologize to the Palestinians for its role in the creation of Israel and for its use "of military violence, political stratagems and economic influence to inflict generations of injustice, destruction, misery and death on a native people living in the path of their plans".

Elmasry has said "The pro-Israel lobby continually strive to discredit anyone who dares to speak the truth about Israeli atrocities against native Palestinians."

He has also written that: "[...]Zionism, as a political ideology, has succeeded only in building an apartheid state for Jews; an elaborate ghetto kept separate from its Palestinian neighbors by concentrated military power, an aesthetically monstrous 'security wall,' economic dependency on Western support, compulsory military conscription and training (including how to kill with weapons), and a hate-based education system for Jewish children that teaches them to despise anyone and anything Palestinian, Arab, or Muslim, in that order."

Elmasry has recognized a diversity of opinion among Israelis, saying that "Many Israelis—and the number steadily grows—now recognize that the occupation and the settlements are twin obstacles to peace."

Elmasry has called for a two-state solution with Israel withdrawing to its pre-1967 border and praised Egyptian leader Anwar Sadat for making peace with Israel in exchange to its withdrawal from the Sinai Desert. However, in April 2008, Elmasry wrote that "Those Palestinians who oppose the one-state solution are those who believe the illusion (promoted by U.S. president George W. Bush, for example) that a two-state solution is just around the corner."

Elmasry has also stated that there is nothing wrong with the "one-state" solution. Elmasry suggested such as state "could divide key positions of power among Jews and the Arabs. For example, Jews could be in charge of the army and Arabs look after the police. The positions of President, Prime Minister, and Speaker of the Parliament could be held in alternating terms by Arabs and Jews." However, Elmasry adds that "the single state solution will never happen in the foreseeable future, of course, because the U.S. is pledged to maintain not only a secure Jewish state, but an expanding Jewish mini-empire carved out of its illegally occupied Palestinian territories."

In an article written in The Canadian Charger in June 2009, Elmasry wrote that "Israelis are indoctrinated in Zionism" and that "violent militarism is not only a Zionist ideal but an economical and a sociological necessity." In a subsequent article, Elmasry wrote that "in the West Zionist Jews create, encourage, support wars in Afghanistan and Iraq... [and] cheer for racist, anti-immigration politicians in Canada and Europe." He also described Zionist Jews as "the enemies of freedom of speech in schools, universities and the public at large" and alleged that the Western media gives "Zionist oppressors a platform that allows them to exploit the Holocaust, and mount disinformation and misinformation campaigns".

=== Joel Kovel ===
In April 2008, Elmasry praised Joel Kovel for his book Overcoming Zionism – Creating a Single Democratic State in Israel/Palestine. Elmasry stated that, on the 60th anniversary of Israel's creation, Kovel's book "is must-read for this difficult and bitter-sweet occasion". Elmasry also stated that "hate that drives Zionist attitudes toward Palestinians" and that Kovel "suggests convincingly that the inner contradictions of Zionism led Israel to develop its 'state-sponsored racism' and that Zionism and democracy are essentially incompatible." Elmasry concluded by stating that the reason Kovel's book has been "buried" is that "our so-called 'free' press and broadcasting networks[...] are free only to those who own them and use their power to express their own views. And that is a sad loss for everyone."

=== Homosexuality ===
In 2004, Ontario Premier Dalton McGuinty encouraged Muslim parents to allow their children to attend public school classes that include teaching tolerance of gays and lesbians. Elmasry acknowledged that "Teaching tolerance at a young age is a must ... but you have to balance that with the appearance that you are not promoting certain values, in this case homosexual families."

In February 2005, Elmasry wrote on the website IslamOnline.net that: "I believe that the responsibilities of Canadian Muslims are to emphasize education in their own community and also other faith communities that homosexuality is against the natural law of the creator, and that it is harmful to the body, the mind and the soul of the person."

=== Robert Mugabe ===
In July 2008, writing in an op-ed for the Montreal Gazette, Elmasry called Robert Mugabe "clumsy" but "no worse than many leaders in the developing world" and questioned: "Why so did many Western media outlets, including Canadian ones, send their own correspondents to cover an election in a poor faraway African country of about 13-million black people? The answer is that Mugabe is hated by the British now as he was hated in 1980 when he was elected the first president of free Zimbabwe, after 90 years of British colonization under the name of Rhodesia." Elmasry praised Mugabe for "trying to implement a land reform; to redistribute the land of about 5,000 white farmers to his country's poor black people" and argued that the collapse of Zimbabwe's economy and the rampant inflation are the result of economic sanctions and not because of Mugabe's land seizures. Elmasy criticized the Western media for not reporting that "Mugabe was and still is popular especially in the rural areas; his land reform has won him support among his own people."

Father Raymond J. de Souza criticized Elmasry for this op-ed, writing that Mugabe is "a man so isolated that even his fellow African dictators have distanced themselves from him". De Souza also wrote that "If he [Elmasry] did not represent himself as Canada's head professional Muslim, Mr. Elmasry's celebration of Mr. Mugabe would have been too incredible to print."

=== Omar Khadr ===
In July 2008, Elmasry wrote that Canadian Prime Minister Stephen Harper is "playing politics" and remains indifferent to Omar Khadr's incarceration at Guantanamo Bay prisoner because Harper had calculated that refusing to press Washington for Khadr's return would score him "political points". Elmasry further stated that "This is where a leader comes in to say, 'This is really wrong and I have to correct that wrong by bringing this person (back to Canada) even if I lose some political points with Islamophobes.' Mr. Harper is playing politics because of the backdrop of Islamophobia in this country... he has to rise above that."

Elmasry contrasted Khadr's case with that of dual Canadian-British citizen William Sampson, who was freed from a death sentence in Saudi Arabia in 2003. Elmasry specifically wrote that:

Why is Stephen Harper so callously indifferent to Omar Khadr's case? It's painfully obvious: William Sampson is a white Westerner while his fellow Canadian citizen, Omar Khadr, is brown-skinned and a Muslim.

However, Elmasry later stated that he was attempting to explain Harper's stance on the file and was not accusing the prime minister of prejudice against Muslims.

Kory Teneycke, Harper's director of communications, responded that if "there is a party playing politics with this case, it's certainly not the Conservative party. The Liberal party is reversing a position that it held for a number of years while in government with respect to how the serious charges against Mr. Khadr should be dealt with. We are very late in that process now and it would be inappropriate to make a change." Teneycke did not comment specifically on Elmasry's words.

=== Environment ===
In August 2008, Elmasry suggested Stéphane Dion and his Green Shift plan could sell to Canadians if he used a green surcharge as well. He also suggested that Canada follow the example of Europe rather than the US when it comes to the environment.

=== Slavery in Islam ===
In an article written in The Canadian Charger in August 2009, Elmasry wrote that:

Islam teaches that slaves, who were then the result of wars, Africans or not, should be treated well and set free as soon as possible...Islam also teaches that slaves can buy their freedom in-kind. Thus many of them excelled to be teachers and even scholars … Islam teaches a slave is a victim of circumstances who should be helped to be free and treated fairly in the mean time. Trading in slaves is a sin. This is in contrast to the teachings of the Bible, "Slaves, obey your earthly masters with fear and trembling."

Jonathan Kay, writing in the National Post, sharply criticized Elmasry. Describing Elmasry's statements as an "absurd elevation of Islam over Christianity", Kay noted that religious Christians led the abolition movement in the West in the 18th and 19th centuries, whereas slavery continued to exist in the Arab world into the 20th century and is still practiced in parts of Islamic Africa such as Sudan. Kay rhetorically asked "what the Christian tribespeople from southern Sudan who have been abducted, forcibly converted to Islam, and enslaved by Arab Muslims in recent years would make of Elmasry's historical fantasies".

== See also ==
- List of University of Waterloo people
