= Sabeeha Rehman =

Pakistani-American author and podcaster

- Born: Sabeeha Akbar; 1951 (age 74–75); Pakistan
- Occupation: Author
- Notable work: Threading My Prayer Rug: One Woman's Journey From Pakistani Muslim to American Muslim; We Refuse to be Enemies: How Muslims and Jews Can Make Peace, One Friendship at a Time
- Spouse: Khalid Rehman (m. 1971)
- Website: sabeeharehman.com

Sabeeha "Bia" Rehman (born 1951) is a Pakistani-American author and podcaster on American Muslim identity and interfaith relations. She is known for Threading My Prayer Rug: One Woman’s Journey From Pakistani Muslim to American Muslim (2016) and We Refuse to be Enemies: How Muslims and Jews Can Make Peace, One Friendship at a Time (with Walter Ruby, 2021).

== Early life and education ==
Sabeeha Rehman was born in 1951 in Pakistan as Sabeeha Akbar. She earned a postgraduate degree from C.B. College in Rawalpindi. Her father served as a lieutenant-colonel in Pakistan Army. After her marriage, she emigrated to the United States, where she completed a two-year diploma in health services administration.

== Career ==
Rehman's first book, Threading My Prayer Rug, described the culture shock she experienced on arrival to the United States. Toronto Sun reviewer Farzana Hassan commended the book's tracing of how Rehman came to love America and forge her American Muslim identity, while coping with a society that views Muslims with suspicion. Hassan disputed Rehman's characterization of jihad as "an innocuous defensive or inner struggle", citing Hassan's own book The Case Against Jihad, concluding that on balance, Rehman's outlook is "refreshingly inclusive". Threading My Prayer Rug made Booklist’s Top 10 Diverse Nonfiction Books of 2017 and was short-listed for the 2018 William Saroyan International Prize for Writing.

While trying to instill in her children a Muslim identity with little peer support, Rehman sought advice from a Jewish friend, calling this “minorities reaching out to minorities”. Rehman's interfaith work has included appearances with the co-author of her second book, We Refuse to be Enemies, Walter Ruby. During such presentations, she has highlighted principles which are shared between Islam and Judaism: "If one life is saved, then all of humanity is saved. If one life is destroyed, then all lives are destroyed. Welcome the stranger. Help those most in need. Stand up for each other."

Rehman's third book It’s Not What You Think: An American Woman in Saudi Arabia covered the six years she and her husband spent in Riyadh. Her 2024 play The Pakistani Bride, a fictionalized drama, depicted cultural pressures around love marriage in Pakistan. Rehman's op-eds have appeared in the Baltimore Sun, Wall Street Journal, Newsweek, and New York Daily News.

== Personal life ==
Sabeeha Rehman is a practising Muslim. She came to the United States from Pakistan in the 1970s after her arranged marriage to Khalid Rehman, an oncologist, in November 1971. Rehman worked as a hospital executive in New Jersey before embarking on her literary career. Seeking resources to provide Muslim education for their children led Rehman to explore questions of American Muslim identity and ultimately interfaith dialogue.

Rehman serves as president of the New York Metro chapter of the National Autism Association (NAANYC).

== Works ==
- Threading My Prayer Rug: One Woman’s Journey From Pakistani Muslim to American Muslim, Arcade Publishing, 2016.
- We Refuse to be Enemies: How Muslims and Jews Can Make Peace, One Friendship at a Time (with Walter Ruby), Arcade Publishing, April 2021.
- It’s Not What You Think: An American Woman in Saudi Arabia, Arcade Publishing, 2022.
- The Pakistani Bride (2024 play)
