= Niqab =

Women's garment in Muslim societies

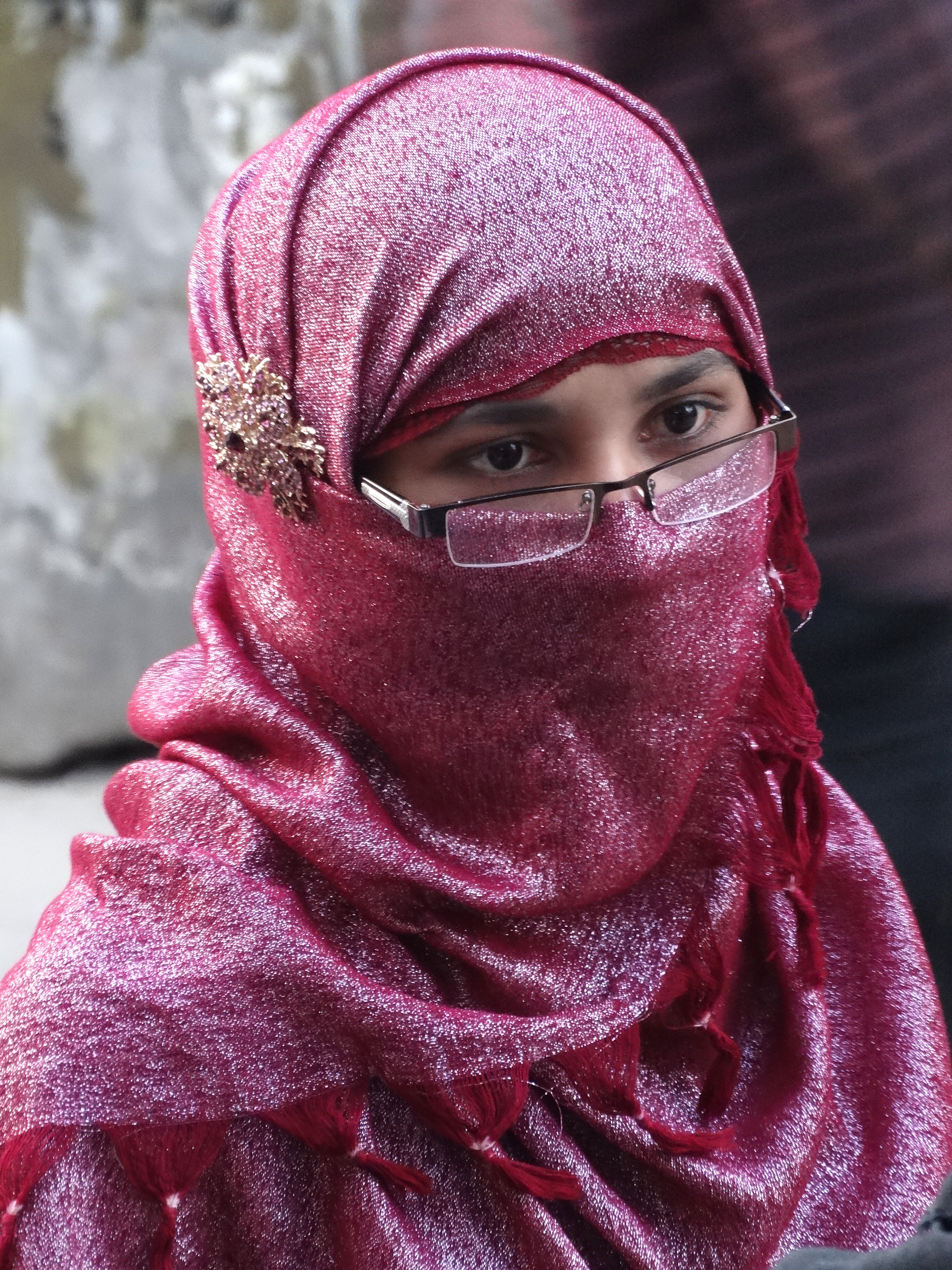
A woman in Bangladesh wearing a niqab

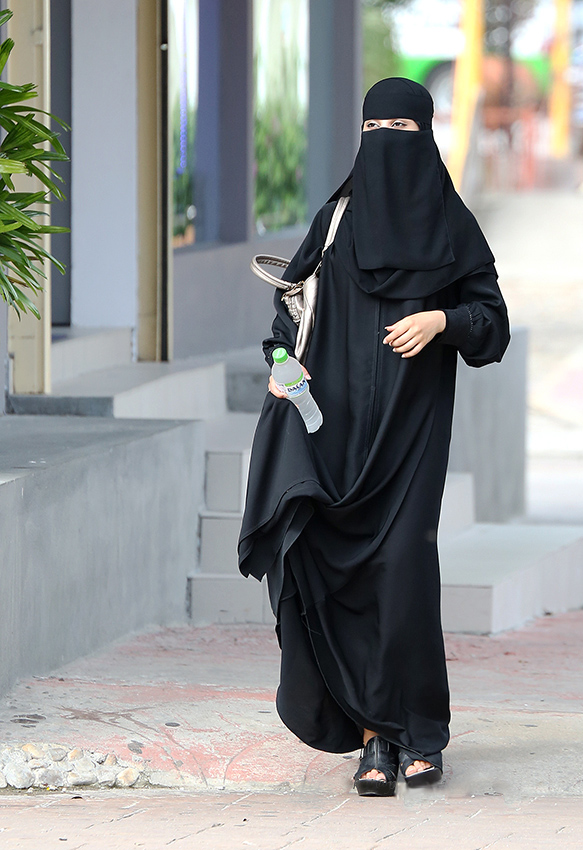
A woman in Saudi Arabia wearing a plain-cloth black niqab

A niqāb, niqab, or niqaab (/nɪˈkɑːb/; Arabic: نقاب), also known as a ruband (Persian: روبند), rubandah (روبنده) or 'qab (colloquial), is a long garment worn by some Muslim women, in order to cover their entire body and face, excluding their eyes. It is an interpretation in Islam of the concept of hijab, and is worn in public and in all other places where a woman may encounter non-mahram men. Most prevalent in the Arabian Peninsula, the niqab is a controversial clothing item in many parts of the world, including in some Muslim-majority countries.

While face veiling practices have ancient roots across various cultures in the Mediterranean, Middle East, and Central Asia, the modern form of niqab became more widespread particularly since the late 1970s Islamic revival, especially among Sunni Muslims throughout the Middle East and North Africa. This phenomenon was encouraged by the rise of "Petro-Islam" under the House of Saud; the propagation of hardline Sunni Islamic doctrines from the oil-producing Arab countries, beginning in earnest after the 1973 Arab–Israeli War, would quickly come to mold the Saudis' ideological response to the religious zeal that the Iranian Revolution had stirred among Shia Muslims. Sponsorship by Saudi Arabia of mosques throughout many Muslim-majority countries led to the increased adoption of Wahhabism and Salafism globally, resulting in the rise of the niqab as one of the more noticeable consequences of the Saudi strain of Islamic revivalism, which flourished greatly throughout the late 20th century. It also consolidated the newfound religious and cultural dominance of Sunni-majority Saudi Arabia over the Arab countries as a whole, effectively serving as a social countermeasure to the religious and cultural influence of Shia-majority Iran.

Since the 2000s, and particularly after the September 11 attacks in the United States, the niqab has increasingly become the subject of negative attention in the Western world, as it is commonly perceived by detractors as a visible sign of growing Islamic extremism and a rejection of Western values. For instance, in Algeria, where the presence of the niqab increased considerably in the 1990s, the Algerian public consciousness began associating the garment with the Islamists who were fighting in the Algerian Civil War; it was also protested by some Algerians as a byproduct of Saudi-backed Islamic fundamentalism—one that lacked authenticity in Algerian culture.

To varying degrees, wearing the niqab or the burqa has been banned by legislation in several countries, including a number of Muslim-majority countries. Most Muslim scholars do not consider the niqab as compulsory for practicing Muslim women. Though similar, the niqab is distinct from the burqa by way of the eyes: a niqab does not cover the eyes, varies in the thickness of the material used, and has visible sleeves; but a burqa is elaborately designed with thicker material that covers the woman's entire body figure and face, lacking sleeves (i.e., keeping the entire body under the uniform cloth) and having a mesh screen to obfuscate the eyes. While the niqab is more widespread, the burqa is largely limited to Central Asia and South Asia, and is most prominent in Afghanistan.

== Use of the term in Arabic ==
Women who wear the niqab are often called niqābīah; this word is used both as a noun and as an adjective. However, the more correct form grammatically is منتقبة muntaqabah / muntaqibah (plural muntaqabāt / muntaqibāt) but niqābīah is used in an affectionate manner (much as with ḥijābīah versus محجبة muḥajjabah). Women in niqab are also called منقبة munaqqabah, with the plural منقبات munaqqabāt.

== Religious doctrine ==
=== In pre-Islamic Arabia ===
In pre-Islamic Arabia, face veiling was common among women of various religious backgrounds. The Roman author Tertullian, who was a Christian, described in The Veiling of Virgins the contemporary societal tendency among pagan Arabian women to cover their entire faces.

=== Women's veiling in Islam ===
One of the earliest records of the Islamic practice of facial veiling comes from the Chinese traveler Du Huan, who visited the Islamic world between 751 and 762. Du Huan's contemporary observations predate the formal codification of the madhhabs. Describing the public customs of Abbasid women, he wrote:

女子出門 必擁蔽其面 無問貴賤

When a woman goes out in public, she must cover her face, irrespective of her lofty or lowly social position.

— Tongdian,Volume 193

Al-Ghazali states in The Revival of the Religious Sciences that "men have always uncovered their faces throughout time, and women have always gone out in niqab." Al-Hafiz Ibn Hajar said in Fath al-Bari: “It has always been the custom of women, both in the past and in the present, to cover their faces from strangers.”

Since the Hanafi, Maliki and Shafi'i madhabs do not require niqab, by extension it is argued that niqab is not an overall mandatory requirement. Therefore, Islamic scholars and contemporary Islamic jurists have agreed that women are not required to cover their face. There exist a number of reasons why women may cover their face in public, and this practice must be understood within a particular social context as well as their madhhab.

==== Styles ====
There are many styles of niqab and other facial veils worn by Muslim women around the world. The two most common forms are the half niqab and the gulf-style or full niqab.

The half niqab is a simple length of fabric with elastic or ties and is worn around the face. This garment typically leaves the eyes and part of the forehead visible.

The gulf-style or full niqab completely covers the face. It consists of an upper band that is tied around the forehead, together with a long wide piece of fabric which covers the face, leaving an opening for the eyes. Many full niqab have two or more sheer layers attached to the upper band, which can be worn flipped down to cover the eyes or left over the top of the head. While a person looking at a woman wearing a niqab with an eyeveil would not be able to see her eyes, the woman wearing the niqab would be able to see out through the thin fabric.

Other less common and more cultural or national forms of niqab include the Afghan style burqa, a long pleated gown that extends from the head to the feet with a small crocheted grille over the face. The Pak chador is a relatively new style from Pakistan, which consists of a large triangular scarf with two additional pieces. A thin band on one edge is tied behind the head so as to keep the chador on, and then another larger rectangular piece is attached to one end of the triangle and is worn over the face, and the simple hijāb wrapped, pinned or tied in a certain way so as to cover the wearer's face.

Other common styles of clothing popularly worn with a niqab in Western countries include the khimar, a semi-circular flare of fabric with an opening for the face and a small triangular underscarf. A khimar is usually bust-level or longer, and can also be worn without the niqab. It is considered a fairly easy form of headscarf to wear, as there are no pins or fasteners; it is simply pulled over the head. Gloves are also sometimes worn with the niqab, because many munaqqabāt believe no part of the skin should be visible other than the area immediately around the eyes or because they do not want to be put in a position where they would touch the hand of an unrelated man (for instance, when accepting change from a cashier). Most munaqqabāt also wear an overgarment (jilbab, abaya etc.) over their clothing, though some munaqabat in Western countries wear a long, loose tunic and skirt instead of a one-piece overgarment.

== Rules and regulations ==
=== Enforcement of the niqab/burqa ===
Covering the face was enforced by the Taliban regime with the traditional Afghan face veil called the burka.

=== Criminalization of the niqab/burqa ===
Countries that have banned the niqab and the burqa either fully or partially, as of 2025. Ban in public places Full or partial ban in some localities Ban on sale and manufacturing Ban in some public buildings or in the public workplace

There are currently 18 states that have banned the niqab and burqa, both Muslim-majority countries and non-Muslim countries, including:

- Africa: Cameroon, Chad, the Republic of the Congo, Gabon, Senegal, Tunisia
- Asia: China, Kyrgyzstan, Sri Lanka, Tajikistan, Turkmenistan, Uzbekistan, Kazakhstan
- Europe: Austria, Belgium, Bulgaria, Denmark, France, Luxembourg, the Netherlands, Switzerland, Portugal, Italy

The niqab is controversial in the Western world. In France specifically, although the niqab is not individually targeted, it falls within the scope of legislation which bans the wearing of any religious items (Christian, Jewish, Muslim, Hindu, or Buddhist) in state schools (universities are not affected), and another ban on face coverings (which also includes carnival masks and motorbike helmets when not on a motorbike).

In 2004, the French Parliament passed a law to regulate "the wearing of symbols indicating religious affiliation in public educational establishments". This law forbids all emblems that outwardly express a specific religious belief to be worn in French public schools. This law was proposed because the Stasi Commission, a committee that is supposed to enforce secularity in French society, was forced to deal with frequent disputes about headscarves in French public schools, as outsiders of the practice did not understand the scarves' purpose and therefore felt uncomfortable.

Although the French law addresses other religious symbols – not just Islamic headscarves and face coverings – the international debate has been centered around the impact it has on Muslims because of the growing population in Europe, especially in France, and the increase in Islamophobia.

In July 2010, the National Assembly in France passed Loi Interdisant La Dissimulation Du Visage Dans L'espace Public, (Act Prohibiting Concealment of the Face in Public Space). This act outlawed the wearing of clothing that covers one's face in any public space. Violators of the ban on veils and coverings are liable to fines of up to 150 euros and mandatory classes on French citizenship. Anyone found to have forced a woman to wear a religious covering faces up to two years in prison as well as a €60,000 fine.

In October 2018, the United Nations Human Rights Committee declared that France's ban disproportionately harmed the right of women to manifest their religious beliefs, and could have the effects of "confining them to their homes, impeding their access to public services and marginalizing them."

==== Discrimination against niqabis ====
The niqab is outlawed in Azerbaijan, where the overwhelming majority of the population is Muslim. Niqabi women, just like women wearing hijab, cannot work as public servants, neither can they continue studies at schools, including the private schools.

Sultaana Freeman gained national attention in 2003 when she sued the US state of Florida for the right to wear a niqab for her driver's license photo. However, a Florida circuit court ruled there was no violation in the state requiring her to show her face to a camera in a private room with only a female employee to take the picture, in exchange for the privilege of driving. The ruling was affirmed by the appellate court.

== Prevalence and legislation by country ==
=== Africa ===
==== Algeria ====
In October 2018, Algeria banned the wearing of full-face veils, including the niqab, for female public servants while at work.

==== Cameroon ====
In July 2015, Cameroon banned the face veil including the burqa after two women dressed in the religious garments completed a suicide attack, killing 13. This was also done in order to counter extremism in public and places of work.

==== Chad ====
In June 2015, the full face veil was banned in Chad after veiled Boko Haram bombers disguised as women carried out multiple suicide attacks.

==== Republic of the Congo ====
In May 2015, the Republic of the Congo banned the face veil in order to counter extremism. The decision was announced by El Hadji Djibril Bopaka, the president of the country's Islamic High Council.

==== Egypt ====
The niqab in Egypt has a complex and long history. On 8 October 2009, Egypt's top Islamic school and the world's leading school of Sunni Islam, Al-Azhar, banned the wearing of the niqab in classrooms and dormitories of all its affiliate schools and educational institutes.

==== Morocco ====
The Moroccan government distributed letters to businesses on 9 January 2017 declaring a ban on the burka. The letters indicated the "sale, production and import" or the garment were prohibited and businesses were expected to clear their stock within 48 hours.

==== Tunisia ====
In July 2019, wearing the niqab was banned in government buildings. The ban came after the capital Tunis was attacked by three suicide bombings in seven days.

=== Asia ===
==== China ====
In February 2015, the city of Ürümqi banned face veils in order to counter extremism. The Chinese government later expanded the ban to all of Xinjiang in March 2017.

==== Iran ====
The niqab was traditionally worn in Southern Iran from the arrival of Islam until the end of the Qajar era. There were many regional variations of niqab, which were also called ruband or pushiye (پوشیه).

The 20th century ruler, Reza Shah, banned all variations of face veil and veils in 1936 known as Kashf-e hijab, as incompatible with his ambitions to westernize the citizens of Iran and their traditional historical culture. Reza Shah ordered the police to arrest women who wore the niqab and hijab and to remove their face veils by force. This policy outraged the clerics who believed it was obligatory for women to cover their faces. Many women gathered at the Goharshad Mosque in Mashhad with their faces covered to show their objection to the niqab ban.

Between 1941 and 1979 wearing the niqab and hijab was no longer against the law, but it was considered by the government to be a "badge of backwardness." During these years, wearing the niqab and chador became much less common and instead most religious women wore headscarves only. Fashionable hotels and restaurants refused to admit women wearing niqabs. High schools and universities actively discouraged or even banned the niqab, though the headscarf was tolerated.

After the new government of 'Islamic Republic' was established, the niqab ban was not enforced by officials.

In modern Iran, the wearing of niqab is not common and is only worn by certain ethnic minorities and a minority of Arab Muslims in the southern Iranian coastal cities, such as Bandar Abbas, Minab, and Bushehr. Some women in the Arab-populated province of Khuzestan still wear the niqab.

==== Kyrgyzstan ====
In Kyrgyzstan, the ban on the Islamic niqab took effect on February 1, 2025, with women facing a fine of 20,000 som ($230) if they wear it in public places.

==== Pakistan ====
In 2015, the constitutional Council of Islamic Ideology issued the fatwa that women are not required to wear niqab or cover their hands or feet under Shariah.

==== Saudi Arabia ====
The niqab is an important part of Saudi culture and in most Saudi cities (including Riyadh, Mecca, Medina, Jeddah, etc.) the vast majority of women cover their faces. The Saudi niqab usually leaves a long open slot for the eyes; the slot is held together by a string or narrow strip of cloth. In 2008, Mohammad Al Habdan, a religious authority in Mecca, reportedly called on women to wear veils that reveal only one eye, so that women would not be encouraged to use eye make-up.

==== Sri Lanka ====
Face veils were banned in the aftermath of the 2019 Sri Lanka Easter bombings.

==== Syria ====
1,200 niqab-wearing teachers were transferred to administrative duties in the summer of 2010 in Syria because the face veil was undermining the secular policies followed by the state as far as education is concerned. In the summer of 2010, students wearing the niqab were prohibited from registering for university classes. The ban was associated with a move by the Syrian government to re-affirm Syria's traditional secular atmosphere.

On 6 April 2011 it was reported that teachers would be allowed to once again wear the niqab.

==== Tajikistan ====
In 2017 the government of Tajikistan passed a law requiring people to "stick to traditional national clothes and culture", which has been widely seen as an attempt to prevent women from wearing traditional Islamic clothing, in particular the style of headscarf wrapped under the chin, in contrast to the traditional Tajik headscarf tied behind the head.

==== Yemen ====
Since antiquity, the Arab tradition of wearing the niqab has been practiced by women living in Yemen. Traditionally, girls begin wearing veils in their teenage years.

Acceptance of the niqab is not universal in Yemen. A senior member of the Al-Islah political party, Tawakkol Karman, removed her niqab at a human rights conference in 2004 and since then has called for "other women and female activists to take theirs off".

=== Europe ===
European countries that have banned the niqab and the burqa either fully or partially, as of 2025: National ban – women are prohibited by federal law from wearing full-face veils in public Local ban – women are banned from wearing full-face veils by legislation in certain cities or regions Partial ban – women are banned from wearing full-face veils in some specific locations

==== Austria ====
In 2017, a legal ban on face-covering Islamic clothing was adopted by the Austrian parliament.

==== Belgium ====
On 29 April 2010, the Belgian Chamber of Representatives adopted a law prohibiting people to wear "attire and clothing masking the face in such a way that it impairs recognizability". The penalty for violating this directive can run from up to 14 days imprisonment and a 250 euro fine.

On 11 July 2017 the ban in Belgium was upheld by the European Court of Human Rights (ECHR) after having been challenged by two Muslim women who claimed their rights had been infringed.

==== Bulgaria ====
In 2016, a legal ban on face-covering Islamic clothing was adopted by the Bulgarian parliament.

==== Denmark ====
In autumn 2017, the Danish parliament (Danish: Folketinget) agreed to adopt a law prohibiting people to wear "attire and clothing masking the face in such a way that it impairs recognizability". A full ban on both niqabs and burqas was announced on 31 May 2018. The ban came into force on 1 August 2018 and carries a fine of 1000 DKK, about 134 euro, by repeat offending the fine may reach 10 000 DKK. Then targets all garments that covers the face, such as fake beards or balaclavas. Supporters of the ban claim that the ban facilitates integration of Muslims into Danish society while Amnesty International claimed the ban violated women's rights. A protest numbering 300-400 people was held in the Nørrebro district of Copenhagen organised by Socialist Youth Front, Kvinder i Dialog and Party Rebels.

The first fine was issued in Hørsholm in August 2018 to a woman dressed in a niqab who was in a fistfight with another woman on an escalator in a shopping centre. During the fight, her face-covering veil fell off, but as police approached, she put it on again and police issued the fine. Both women were suspected of public order violations.

==== France ====
On 13 July 2010 France's lower house of parliament overwhelmingly approved a ban on wearing burqa-style Islamic veils. The legislation forbids face-covering Muslim veils in all public places in France and calls for fines or citizenship classes, or both. The bill also is aimed at husbands and fathers – anyone convicted of forcing someone else to wear the garb risks a year of prison and a fine, with both penalties doubled if the victim is a minor.

==== Germany ====
In 2017, a legal ban on face-covering clothing for soldiers and state workers during work was approved by German parliament. Also in 2017, a legal ban on face-covering clothing for car and truck drivers was approved by German Ministry of Traffic.

In July 2017, German state Bavaria approved a legal ban on face-covering clothing for teachers, state workers and students at university and schools.

In August 2017, the state of Lower Saxony (German: Niedersachsen) banned the burqa along with the niqab in public schools. This change in the law was prompted by a Muslim pupil in Osnabrück who wore the garment to school for years and refused to take it off. Since she has completed her schooling, the law was instituted to prevent similar cases in the future.

In July 2020, the state of Baden-Württemberg banned face-covering veils for pupils, which extended the ban which was already in force for school staff.

==== Italy ====
In Italy, a law issued in 1975 strictly forbids wearing any attire in public that could hide the face of a person. Penalties (fines and imprisonment) are provided for such behaviour. The original purpose of the anti-mask law was to prevent crime or terrorism. The law allows for exemptions for a "justified cause", which has sometimes been interpreted by courts as including religious reasons for wearing a veil, but others – including local governments – disagree and claim religion is not a "justified cause" in this context. In October 2025, the Italian government proposed a bill to forbid islamic face covering. In September 2026, less than 14 months before the next Italian general election, Prime Minister Giorgia Meloni promised that the bill would progress.

==== Latvia ====
In 2016, a legal ban on face-covering Islamic clothing was proposed for adoption by the Latvian parliament.

==== Netherlands ====
In 2007, the government of the Netherlands planned a legal ban on face-covering Islamic clothing, popularly described as the 'burqa ban', which included the niqab. In 2015, a partial ban of the niqab and burqa were approved by the Dutch government. The parliament still had to approve the measure. In November 2016, the legal ban on face-covering was approved by parliament. On 26 June 2018, a partial ban on face covering (including niqabs) on public transport and in buildings and associated yards of educational institutions, governmental institutions and healthcare institutions was enacted, with a number of exceptions.

==== Norway ====
In 2012 in Norway, a professor at the University of Tromsø denied a student's use of niqab in the classroom. The professor claimed Norway's parliament granted each teacher the right to deny the use of niqab in his/her classroom. Clothing that covers the face, such as a niqab, is prohibited in some schools and municipalities.

The Prime Minister of Norway Erna Solberg stated in an interview that in Norwegian work environments it is essential to see each other's faces and therefore anyone who insists on wearing a niqab is in practice unemployable. Solberg also views the wearing of the niqab as a challenge to social boundaries in the Norwegian society, a challenge that would be countered by Norway setting boundaries of its own. Solberg also stated that anyone may wear what they wish in their spare time and that her comments applied to professional life but that any immigrant has the obligation to adapt to Norwegian work life and culture.

In autumn 2017, Norway government adopted a law prohibiting people to wear "attire and clothing masking the face in such a way that it impairs recognizability" in schools and in universities.

In June 2018, the parliament of Norway passed a bill banning clothing covering the face at educational institutions as well as daycare centres, which included face-covering Islamic veils. The prohibition applies to pupils and staff alike.

==== Portugal ====
In October 2025, parliament in Portugal passed a bill banning clothing covering the face.

==== Sweden ====
In 2012, a poll by Uppsala University found that Swedes believed that face-covering Islamic veils are either completely unacceptable or fairly unacceptable, 85% for the burqa and 81% for the niqāb. The researchers noted these figures represented a compact resistance to the face-covering veil by the population of Sweden.

In December 2019, the municipality of Skurup banned Islamic veils in educational institutions. Earlier, the municipality of Staffanstorp approved a similar ban.

==== Switzerland ====
In July 2016, the Canton of Ticino banned face-covering veils.

In September 2018, a ban on face-covering veils was approved with a 67% vote in favour in the canton of St Gallen. The largest Islamic community organisation in Switzerland, the Islamic Central Council, recommended that Muslim women continue to cover their faces.

In March 2021, a nationwide referendum was held on whether full-face coverings should be banned in public, which includes niqabs and burqas. Voters narrowly voted to ban niqabs and burqas by a 51.2% to 48.8% margin.

==== United Kingdom ====
In the United Kingdom, comments by Jack Straw, MP, started a national debate over the wearing of the "veil" (niqab), in October 2006. Around that time there was media coverage of the case of Aishah Azmi, a teaching assistant in Dewsbury, West Yorkshire, who lost her appeal against suspension from her job for wearing the niqab while teaching English to young children. It was decided that being unable to see her face prevented the children from learning effectively. Azmi, who had been interviewed and hired for the position without the niqab, allegedly on her husband's advice, argued it was helping the children understand different people's beliefs. In 2010, a man committed a bank robbery wearing a niqab as a disguise.

=== North America ===
==== Canada ====
The niqab is banned in the Canadian province of Quebec in all publicly funded services. Persons cannot receive public service or provide public service with their faces covered. This includes public transportation, hospitals, and courts amongst others. On 18 October 2017, Bill 62 passed into law after a 66–51 vote in the Quebec National Assembly. The new law is entitled "An Act to foster adherence to State religious neutrality and, in particular, to provide a framework for requests for accommodation on religious grounds in certain bodies". However, regulations regarding the ban's implementation, and religious accommodations, are not expected until July 2018.

On 16 November 2015 the first act of Canada's newly appointed Minister of Justice and Attorney General Jody Wilson-Raybould was to assure women who chose to wear the niqāb during the Oath of Allegiance of their right to do so. In December 2011 then-Citizenship and Immigration Minister Jason Kenney announced a policy directive from the Federal Government under then-Prime Minister Stephen Harper that Muslim women must remove niqābs throughout the citizenship ceremony where they declare their Oath of Allegiance. Zunera Ishaq, a Sunni Muslim woman living in Mississauga, Ontario, challenged and won the niqāb ban in the case of Canada v Ishaq on 5 October 2015. The Federal Court of Appeal decision in her favour was seen by some as "an opportunity to revisit the rules governing the somewhat difficult relationship between law and policy." In October 2015 Harper had appealed the Supreme Court of Canada to take up the case. With the election of Prime Minister Justin Trudeau on 19 October 2015, the niqāb debate was settled as the Liberal government chose to not "politicize the issue any further." Minister Wilson-Raybould, who is the first Indigenous person to be named as Justice Minister, explained as she withdrew Harper's appeal to the Supreme Court, "In all of our policy as a government we will ensure that we respect the values that make us Canadians, those of diversity, inclusion and respect for those fundamental values." The Justice Minister spoke with Zunera by telephone to tell her the news prior to making her official announcement.

Elections Canada, the agency responsible for elections and referendums, stated that Muslim women can cover their faces while voting. The decision was criticized by the Conservative Party of Canada, Bloc Québécois, and Liberal Party of Canada. The New Democrats were not opposed to the decision. The Conservative federal Cabinet had introduced legislation to parliament that would bar citizens from voting if they arrived at polling stations with a veiled face.

The niqāb became an issue in the 2007 election in Quebec after it became public knowledge that women wearing the niqāb were allowed to vote under the same rules as electors who did not present photo identification (ID); namely, by sworn oath in the presence of a third party who could vouch for their identity. The chief electoral officer received complaints that this policy was too accommodating of cultural minorities (a major theme in the election) and thereafter required accompaniment by bodyguards due to threatening telephone calls. All three major Quebec political parties were against the policy, with the Parti Québécois and Action démocratique du Québec vying for position as most opposed. The policy was soon changed to require all voters to show their face, even if they did not carry photo ID. However, Quebec residents who wear the niqāb stated they were not opposed to showing their faces for official purposes, such as voting. Salam Elmenyawi of the Muslim Council of Montreal estimated that only 10 to 15 Muslim voters in the province wear the niqāb and, since their veils have become controversial, most would probably not vote.

In October 2009, the Muslim Canadian Congress called for a ban on burqa and niqāb, saying that they have "no basis in Islam". Spokesperson Farzana Hassan cited public safety issues, such as identity concealment, as well as gender equality, stating that wearing the burqa and niqāb is "a practice that marginalizes women."

In December 2012, the Supreme Court of Canada ruled that Muslim women who wear the niqāb must remove it in some cases when testifying in court.

==== United States ====
In 2002, Sultaana Freeman (formerly Sandra Keller, who converted to Islam in 1997 when marrying a Muslim man), sued the U.S. state of Florida for the right to wear a niqab for her driver's license photo. However, a Florida appellate court ruled that there was no violation in the state requiring her to show her face to a camera in a private room with only a female employee to take the picture, in exchange for the privilege of driving. The prevailing view in Florida is currently that hiding one's face on a form of photo identification defeats the purpose of having the picture taken, although 15 other states (including Arkansas, California, Idaho, Indiana, Iowa, Kansas, and Louisiana) have provisions that allow for driver's licenses absent of an identifying photograph in order to accommodate individuals who may have a religious reason to not have a photograph taken. In 2012, a string of armed robberies in Philadelphia were committed by people disguised in traditional Islamic woman's garb; Muslim leaders were concerned that the use of the disguises could put Muslim women in danger of hate crimes and inflame ethnic tensions.

=== Oceania ===
==== Australia ====
In May 2010, an armed robbery committed by a man wearing a face veil and sunglasses raised calls to ban the Islamic veil; a request for new legislation was dismissed by both Prime Minister Kevin Rudd and Liberal leader Tony Abbott.

== See also ==
- List of types of hijab, including the niqab garment
  - Burkini, a swimsuit worn by Muslim women to conform to Islamic clothing standards
- Purdah, the practice of female seclusion in Hindu and Muslim societies
  - Ghoonghat, a cultural see-through veil worn by women over their face in Indian societies
- Litham, a partial face veil worn by nomadic North African men
