= Catherine Gebotys =

Canadian computer engineer

Catherine H. Gebotys (born 1960) is a Canadian computer engineer specializing in the security of embedded systems and in cryptographic algorithms more generally. She is a professor of electrical and computer engineering at the University of Waterloo.

== Education ==
Gebotys graduated from the University of Toronto in 1982 with a bachelor's degree in engineering science, and earned a master's degree in electrical engineering there in 1984. She completed her Ph.D. in 1991 at the University of Waterloo. Her dissertation, A Global Optimization Approach to Architectural Synthesis of VLSI Digital Synchronous Systems with Analog and Asynchronous Interfaces, was supervised by Mohamed Elmasry.

== Books ==
Gebotys is the author of the book Security in Embedded Devices (Springer, 2010). With Elmasry, she is the coauthor of Optimal VLSI Architectural Synthesis: Area, Performance and Testability (Kluwer, 1992).
