= Canadian Arab Federation =

Group representing Arab Canadians

The Canadian Arab Federation (CAF) was formed in 1967 to represent the interests of Arab Canadians with respect to the formulation of public policy in Canada. It presently consists of over 40 member organizations.

CAF's stated objectives include protecting civil liberties and human rights as well as combating racism and hate within Canada. It has been most vocal against anti-Arab and anti-Muslim activities in Canada, and has issued many position papers to the government with respect to its policies in the Southwest Asia and its domestic immigration policies. It discharges its political tasks by building media and government relations and grassroots support through various capacity-building projects within the Canadian Arab community, and promoting Muslim and Arab culture.

Khaled Mouammar led the organization in the 1970s and again 1980–1982. Omar Alghabra was president from 2004–2005. Mouammar was re-elected in 2006. Its current president is Farid Ayad.

== History ==
Since its founding in 1967, the CAF has represented the Arab community with regard to a range of foreign and domestic issues.

The CAF opposed the Camp David Accord signed by Egyptian President Anwar El Sadat and Israeli Prime Minister Menachem Begin on September 17, 1978, and protested Begin's visit to Canada shortly thereafter.

In 1982, the CAF commissioned a study on the depiction of Arabs in political cartoons published between 1972 and 1982 in Canadian dailies. Published in 1986, the study determined that Arabs were repeatedly portrayed in a stereotypical fashion as bloodthirsty terrorists, untrustworthy, ignorant, cruel, and backward. The researcher pointed to the danger of such pervasive negative imagery, recalling the role played by German caricaturists in their similar depictions of Jews as laying the basis for the Holocaust.

In The Holocaust, Israel, and Canadian Protestant Churches (2002), Haim Genizi writes of the CAF's participation in a 1982–83 initiative of the Canadian Council of Churches (CCC) to launch a tripartite Southwest Asian discussion group for the CCC, the Canadian Jewish Congress (CJC), and the CAF. When the CJC declined to dialogue with Arabs, meetings between the CAF and the CCC alone continued on for eight months, ending with agreement on the need to educate Canadians to dispel anti-Arab stereotyping. For the churches, there was also recognition of the need to formulate a clear policy on Southwest Asia situation.

During the Gulf War, CAF documented over 100 violent anti-Arab incidents, calling the security roundup of more than 1,000 Arab-Canadians the most encompassing security sweep in Canada's history.

On June 14, 2004, the CAF, in cooperation with the Canadian Council on American-Islamic Relations (CAIR-CAN), presented before the Arar Commission, a Canadian special commission set up to investigate the extraordinary rendition and torture of Maher Arar. A Canadian citizen of Syrian origin, Arar was detained by American immigration officials at a New York airport on a stopover there between Geneva and Toronto. He was sent to Syria, where he was imprisoned and tortured for a year before being released. The CAF and CAIR-CAN reminded the special commission that there need, "be no contradiction between security and the fundamental values we share as Canadians". The joint submission continued:

Democratic and legal rights and liberties, pluralism, respect for human dignity and the rule of law are the principles that define us as Canadians. These are the 'basic tenets' of our legal system that find their explicit affirmation in the Charter. They are what safeguard democracy. If, in the name of fighting terrorism, we sacrifice these values for the sake of security, we lose our character, our identity, the very essence of a free and democratic society. We lose the war on terrorism if we become that kind of state that represses democratic rights and freedoms.

Alghabra was the president of the Canadian Arab Federation (CAF) in 2004-5. After Alghabra left CAF, the group made controversial statements, and Alghabra condemned those statements.

== Israeli–Palestinian conflict activism ==
=== 1970s–1980s ===
The CAF opposed Prime Minister Joe Clark's 1979 pledge to move the Canadian embassy in Israel from Tel Aviv to Jerusalem, and welcomed Clark's eventual retreat on the issue. CAF President Khaled Mouammar said that moving the embassy would have meant recognizing territory that was taken by force. In 1980, Mouammar said he would call for a boycott of stores selling Dedy Toys, which imported materials from a settlement in the occupied West Bank.

In 1981, the CAF hosted a press conference for two Palestinian mayors who had been deported by Israel from the West Bank. The mayors called for Canada to put pressure on the government of Israel to permit them to return. Khaled Mouammar condemned Israel's attack on Iraq's Osirik nuclear reactor later in the year, and described Israeli Prime Minister Menachem Begin as an "unrepentant terrorist" who was a constant threat to the region.

In September 1982, the CAF led a non-violent demonstration in Toronto against the massacre of between 762 and 3,500 civilians, mostly Palestinians and Lebanese Shiites, in Sabra and the Shatila refugee camp in Beirut, Lebanon. The organization later partnered with the Arab-Palestine Association to find sponsors for children who had been orphaned in the attacks.

When Canadian Prime Minister Pierre Elliott Trudeau recognized the right of Palestinians to a homeland in 1983, his statement was supported by the Canadian Arab Federation. Rashad Saleh, Mouammar's successor as CAF president, said that Canada's Arab community would strongly support any peace efforts brought forward by the prime minister.

Prominent members of the Canadian Arab Federation criticized the Very Rev. Canon Borden Purcell in 1984, for comments that he made about antisemitism and anti-Zionism. Purcell, who was chair of the Ontario Human Rights Commission at the time, had remarked that "public expressions of anti-Zionism have now replaced public expressions of anti-Semitism". Saleh responded that most Arabs oppose Zionism because of its pivotal role in the foundation of the State of Israel and of the "present plight of the Palestinians", adding that it was "not directed at Jews or their religion." Purcell later clarified that he did not believe "being anti-Zionist is necessarily anti-Semitic".

In March 1984, the Canadian Arab Federation reported that a Montreal company hiring aircraft technicians to work in Israel was using discriminatory practices against Muslims. According to the CAF, LPL Engineering Services Ltd. informed an applicant that he was disqualified for the position because of his religion. A spokesperson for the company subsequently said, "There's a war going on out there, so why should the Israelis employ Arabs to work on secret projects. Would the Americans employ Russians?" The CAF indicated that it would consider filing an application before the Canadian Human Rights Commission or the Quebec Provincial Human Rights Commission. In the same year, the CAF criticized the Canadian government for its refusal to allow into Canada the Most Rev. Archbishop Hilarion Capucci, titular archbishop of Caesarea for the Melkite Greek Catholic Church, who served several years in prison in Israel in the 1970s for using his diplomatic status to smuggle arms to the Palestine Liberation Army. The federation argued that his exclusion was part of "a strategy to keep articulate and informed spokesmen for the Palestinian cause ... out of the public eye."

Also in 1984, the CAF undertook a fundraising campaign to build a cultural centre in the Israeli Arab community of Nazareth. Saleh asserted that the Israeli government was not providing the city with adequate infrastructure.

=== Support for boycott of Israeli goods ===
In a press release responding to the recent stepped up Israeli attacks on Gaza known as Operation Summer Rains, the CAF urged the Canadian government to "join Canadian churches and unions by boycotting Israeli goods, divesting from Israeli companies, and imposing sanctions until Israel withdraws from all the occupied Arab territories, dismantles all settlements and tears down the Apartheid Wall."

CAF's president, Khaled Mouammar, has referred to Israel as "the Israeli apartheid regime". In "Impressions of Palestine – 1948 Today", he wrote of a "racist ideology that guides the Apartheid State of Israel" and of his conviction "that one day the nightmare brought about by Zionism and colonialism will come to an end."

Mouammar criticized Toronto Mayor David Miller for participating in Toronto's "Walk for Israel," stating that Israel is "a pariah state," and that Israel "systematically violates international law and practices racism".

In a letter published in The Globe and Mail, Mouammar clarified that the CAF's stance on anyone who supports Israel is that "we [the CAF] assert that any support for Israel is support for apartheid, occupation and war crimes."

In his capacity as president of the Canadian Arab Federation, Mouammar has condemned Zionist organizations in Canada for their support of Israel. In January 2007, he wrote that Bnai Brith Canada and the Jewish Defence League were using "bullying and intimidation tactics to silence criticism of Israel" and had launched "a vicious campaign of intimidation" against movements that call for boycotts of Israel within the Canadian political landscape. He also wrote that as more people support boycotts of Israel, "the more difficult it becomes for pro-Israel groups such as B'nai Brith and the JDL to spew their propaganda."

Regarding an October 2007 Hamilton Declaration which stated "We further specifically caution you against any recognition of Israel as a 'Jewish state.' Such a recognition would give Israel the façade of moral and legal legitimacy". Khaled Mouammar stated that he "certainly agrees" with the declaration. However, the CAF did not sign the declaration because it "does not qualify," since the document was endorsed at a convention for Palestinians, and not for Arabs in general.

In January 2008, the CAF and the Canadian Islamic Congress stated that "[the] Apartheid regime of the Jewish state escalated its genocidal crimes against the indigenous people of Palestine" and that "Palestinians continue to endure death, deprivation and destruction under more than 40 years of brutal Israeli occupation that has become an insidious and unremitting genocide."

In March 2008, the CAF and the Canadian Islamic Congress stated that "Israel was founded upon the ethnic cleansing of the Palestinian people. Between 1947 and 1948, nearly 800,000 Palestinians were expelled from their homes and lands and over 500 Palestinian villages and neighborhoods were destroyed, and their inhabitants prevented from ever returning to their homeland."

In May 2008, on the 60th anniversary of Israel's founding, CAF president Khaled Mouammar stated that

CAF applauds the growing isolation of Israel through the boycott and divestment campaign that has been embraced by many labour, academic and religious organizations in Canada and abroad, and the growing realization among youth and students that Israeli practices and policies mirror those of Apartheid South Africa. CAF believes that popular awareness of the plight of Palestinians will bring the day when the Israeli occupation will end and the refugees will return to Palestine.

=== Criticisms of Canadian–Israel relations ===
==== Israel–Canada free trade agreement ====
In July 2006, CAF president Khaled Mouammar wrote that:

The Canadian government has been a major supporter of the Israeli Apartheid Regime, both economically (Canada has a Free Trade Agreement with Israel that grosses over 1 billion dollars) and diplomatically (Canada voted against the Palestinian Refugees Right of Return at the UN in March of this year, Canada was also the first country to declare sanctions against the Democratically elected Hamas government).

==== "Israel's values are Canada's values" ====
In April 2007, Mouammar criticized Bob Rae for supporting Israel, stating in the Vancouver Sun that:

Canadians have a duty to criticize politicians like Bob Rae who support an apartheid state that commits serious human rights violations, and those like Paul Martin and Stephen Harper who shamefully declare that "Israel's values are Canada's values."

==== Canadian opposition to UN resolution lifting blockade of Gaza ====
In February 2008, Mouammar criticised the Conservative Government of Stephen Harper, stating that:

The Harper government's decision to boycott and starve the democratically elected government of the Palestinians under occupation, and its opposition to a UN resolution calling for the lifting of the siege of Gaza, has given Israel the green light to intensify and escalate its crimes against the Palestinian people. The Harper government's silence, while Israel commits these massacres against the Palestinian people and engages in an ongoing campaign of assassinations in Lebanon and Syria, makes the government morally complicit in these crimes.

==== Canadian support for Israel's 2008–2009 attacks in Gaza ====
In January 2009, Ali Mallah, a CAF Vice-President, sharply criticized the Conservative Government of Stephen Harper for its position on the 2008–2009 Israel–Gaza conflict. At a protest outside the Israeli Consulate in Toronto, Mallah stated, in a speech to the crowd, that:

[Canadian Minister of Transport] John Baird was quoted as saying the resisters in Palestine are cowards. Well I have news for you John Baird and Stephen Harper, the only coward we know is Stephen Harper and his government.

==== Hezbollah ====
Ali Mallah, a CAF Vice-President stated Hezbollah "is seen as a symbol of the struggle against Israeli oppression, injustice and occupation." During the 2006 Israel/Hezbollah conflict, CAF President Khaled Mouammar criticized the Canadian Government stance on Hezbollah, stating that:

By refusing to deal with Hezbollah, a political party represented in the Lebanese government whose resistance to Israel's aggression is supported by 87 per cent of Lebanese citizens, Peter MacKay is parroting the Bush administration's stand and is emboldening Israel to launch further wars against its neighbours.

==== Hamas ====
In a policy paper released in November 2006, the CAF defended Hezbollah and Hamas, stating that "Both of these groups are legitimate political parties, with grassroots support, and are represented in the legislature and the cabinets of Lebanon and the Palestinian Authority respectively. Both groups are resisting the illegal Israeli occupation of Lebanon and Palestine respectively which right is guaranteed under international law" and called on the Canadian Government to "remove Hezbollah and Hamas from the list of banned organizations."

==== Canadian boycott of Durban II Conference ====
In January 2008, the Canadian government announced it was planning to boycott the 2009 World Conference against Racism (referred to commonly as "Durban II"). The Government justified its decision by stating that the first Durban Conference of 2001 "turned into an embarrassing promotion of racist attitudes" and became "a bit of a circus for intolerance and bigotry, particularly but not exclusively directed at the Jewish people."

The Canadian Arab Federation strongly opposed this decision, stating in a news release that "Canada's outright rejection of the conference sends a clear message to the Canadian public that the current government is disinterested [sic] in promoting human rights and anti-racism." As for the activities of the first Durban conference in 2001 in relation to Israel, the CAF argued that this "indicates that the international community and human rights organizations are in agreement that the occupation of Arab lands, the mistreatment and killing of Palestinians, and the denial of the right of Palestinian refugees to return is in violation of international law and will be condemned and no longer accepted" and that "It is ironic that the Canadian government is so outspoken about shunning the conference due to the fear of hearing criticisms against the Israeli occupation, given its own past with hate and bigotry".

=== Statement on racism in Israel ===
In January 2007, CAF President Khaled Mouammar wrote in the Toronto Star that: "for the Jewish president of Israel to believe that he is being targeted because of his Middle Eastern origin speaks volumes about the racism permeating Israeli society. This does not come as a surprise to the 1.2 million Palestinian Arab citizens of Israel who are Christians and Muslims. The racism they face is a result of official racist policies by the Israeli government." Mouammar concluded that "Racism in Israel is becoming mainstream."

B'nai Brith Canada, a Canadian Jewish organization, criticized CAF President Khaled Mouammar for his comments on Israel. B'nai Brith Executive Vice-President Frank Dimant wrote that:

Israel is a vibrant, democratic society founded on the principles of tolerance and respect for all of its citizens. This includes the more than 1 million Arabs who call Israel home, who participate in the political process and who have obtained top-level positions in society. This is in stark contrast to Israel's neighbouring Arab nations. While Mouammar may speak of discrimination of Arabs in Israel, it is curious that these same Palestinians have time and again expressed their preferred desire to live in Israel rather than be placed under the control of the Palestinian Authority.

=== Flyer on Bob Rae's political positions on the Middle East ===
During the Liberal Leadership contest (where delegates met to vote for the new leader of Liberal Party of Canada), a flyer circulated electronically among convention delegates denounced candidate Bob Rae for:

1. Having delivered a speech to the Jewish National Fund (JNF). The flyer stated that "the Jewish National Fund manages all state lands in Israel and allows only Jews to live on such land, a 'practice that amounts to ethnic cleansing,' and added that 'Canadians have the right to know who supports the JNF in Canada.'"
1. That his wife served as vice-president of the Canadian Jewish Congress, a lobby group, according to the flyer that "supports Israeli apartheid.

It was produced and disseminated to all Canadian Members of Parliament by Ron Saba, the editor of the website Montreal Planet. The CAF, in a news release, supported the contents of the flyer stating that "CAF believes that Canadians have the right to know the factual information provided."

The Canadian Jewish Congress condemned the flyer and its circulation by the "president of the Canadian Arab Federation." Both CJC's President Ed Morgan and CJC's CEO said the purpose behind raising the fact that Rae's wife is a member of the Congress's board was "strictly to say that his wife is a Jew."

Mouammar countered that the CJC response was "a pitiful attempt to discredit" the CAF and that the flyer "nothing to do with Bob Rae's and his wife's religion and ethnicity but has a lot to do with their political views." Mouammar also denied that the CAF had any role in distributing the flyer. However, the Canadian Press noted that it had procured a copy of an email from Mouammar forwarding the flyer to others.

Yoine Goldstein, a Canadian Senator and the Vice President of the Jewish National Fund sharply criticized Mouammar for distributing the letter saying that it was racist and that it was "brazenly anti-Canadian."

=== Tarek Fatah and the CAF ===
In February 2009, Tarek Fatah, founder of the Muslim Canadian Congress (MCC) sharply criticized the Canadian Arab Federation (CAF) in an article published in the National Post. Fatah, who received the CAF's highest award in December 2001, stated that the CAF's current leadership has turned the organization "into a mouthpiece for Hamas and Hezbollah in Canada." Fatah stated that the CAF used to sponsor debates on the pros and cons of the Oslo peace accord but today labels "any backer of the two-state solution [as] a traitor to the Muslim cause." Fatah claimed that CAF's vice-president in Ontario, Ali Mallah, referred to the Muslim Canadian Congress in an online forum as "house negros" and had stated that Fatah himself has "no shred of decency of integrity left" and that he serves "Zionist masters."

In response to Fatah's article, CAF Vice-President Ali Mallah subsequently emailed a response to a large group of recipients. In the email, which was later republished by the National Post, Mallah wrote that:

Tarek Fatah has earned the perfect description by Late Malcolm X and proven to be a very loyal "house Negro". In this desperate attempt to malign CAF on the pages of Zionist mouth piece National Post, he is saying one thing correct: Yes, CAF awarded him that award, but that was when Tarek Fatah was cheating his way through and pretending to be pro-palestine, pro-social justice, pro-multiculturalism and Anti-Liberal Party...etc (I am sure that every one knows this sell out, is fully aware of the shameless transformation of this sorry case of human being). I admit that I was duped by his fake lies and nominated him for that award. Now, since he is totally exposed and has no cloth left, He should return that Award as he does not deserve the honour associated with it.

=== Awards ===
Zafar Bangash, Former Editor Crescent International

In June 2007, the CAF honoured Zafar Bangash at a gala dinner for his "unwavering" support of Palestine. Bangash was the former editor of Crescent International, an Islamist newsletter, based in Ontario. According to Licia Corbella of Sun Media, Bangash is a supporter of Hezbollah and uses the term kuffar (non-believers) to refer to non-Muslims derogatorily. When reached in Toronto by phone by Corbella, Mouammar refused to believe that Bangash used the term kuffar stating: "He's a man of dignity. He has no blood on his hands like those Israeli war criminals who come to Canada and are received by our politicians, like Ariel Sharon."

Sid Ryan, CUPE President

The CAF has also granted awards to CUPE Ontario president Sid Ryan, whose union passed a resolution to boycott Israel at their annual convention.

Ehab Lotayef, Montreal Activist

Another CAF award winner is Ehab Lotayef, a Montreal activist who started a boycott of Chapters and Indigo book stores because of Heather Reisman and Gary Schwartz' support for the Heseg Foundation for Lone Soldiers, a charity that provides university scholarships for former IDF soldiers who were classified as a Lone soldier during their service in the Israel Defense Forces.

=== 2008 essay competition ===
In 2008, the Canadian Arab Federation and the Canadian Islamic Congress (CIC) launched an essay contest that "invites Canadian high school and university students (ages 17 through 27) to write an essay on the theme "The Ethnic Cleansing of Palestine" and is part of activities commemorating the 60th anniversary of Nakba – the ethnic cleansing of Palestinians from their homeland in 1947–48."

Criticism from Bnai Brith Canada

Bnai Brith Canada, a Canadian Jewish Organization, criticized the contest, stating that it is a "blatant [propagandistic] initiative that distorts reality, delegitimizing the existence of the Jewish state in any shape or form". The national essay contest announced by these groups encouraging youth to write on "Ethnic Cleansing of Palestine", is based on the false assumption that the Jewish presence in the Jewish People’s ancestral homeland is illegal" and that "This sham of a contest joins together Canadian-Arab groups, which purport to reflect mainstream positions, but which clearly hold extremist notions that deny Israel’s right to exist."

Bnai Brith Canada also stated that the contest "intentionally distorts reality and serves only to engender hate against Israel, its Jewish citizens and supporters here in Canada. Rather than constructively look for creative ways in which to address the complex politics of Southwest Asia, the leaders of these Canadian-Arab organizations appear intent on fostering malevolence towards Israel, based on lies and distortions."

Bnai Brith Canada called on Universities and high schools "to issue clear directives to staff that the contest, an exercise in hate targeting the Jewish State, is contrary to the equity and human rights policies of these institutions."

Response to Bnai Brith Canada criticism

The Canadian Arab Federation and Canadian Islamic Congress (CIC) responded to Bnai Brith Canada, stating that "This call to shutdown academic research and free speech is typical of B'nai Brith's contempt for the basic principles of academic institutions. These tactics of intimidation are becoming an all too common refrain of pro-Israel organizations, and are simply designed to stem the growing public awareness of Israel’s apartheid policies."

They also stated that "B'nai Brith's response to this essay competition is one further confirmation that pro-Israel organizations fear the wide support amongst Canadians for justice in Palestine. The myths surrounding Israel's establishment are being exposed for what they are, and thousands of high school and university students across the country are active in solidarity campaigns with the Palestinian people" and that "B'nai Brith has once again proven that its claim to support human rights is nothing but a rhetorical device designed to obfuscate their support of Israel’s policies of discrimination, apartheid and ethnic cleansing."

== Dispute with Jason Kenney and Federal funding ==
In February 2009, Immigration Minister Jason Kenney announced that he would review and possibly reduce or eliminate federal funding to the Canadian Arab Federation (CAF). Reportedly, this was prompted when CAF president Khaled Mouammar called Kenney a "professional whore" for supporting Israel and criticizing the presence of Hezbollah and Hamas flags at recent protests in Toronto. Kenney justified the decision by stating groups whose leaders say "intolerant or hateful things" should be denied taxpayer funding. Kenney stated that "We should not be rewarding those who express views that are contrary to Canada's best liberal values of tolerance and mutual respect."

CAF President Mouammar responded that Kenney's decision was "vindictive" and accused him of promoting Islamophobia internationally. He also stated that the government of Stephen Harper "is anti-Arab and anti-Muslim." He also criticized the government for refusing to meet with the Canadian Arab Federation or the Canadian Islamic Congress since it came to power in 2005. Mouammar also stated that the proposed cuts would damage settlement programs run by the CAF in Toronto which teach new immigrants language and job searching skills.

CAF executive director Mohamed Boudjenane suggested that the government's motive for punishing the CAF was political, stating that "They maybe decided to go after the Zionist vote, like Reisman and Schwartz and Tannenbaum – people who used to be Liberal." He also stated that the "Government cannot tell one group that they deserve tax money and another that they don't. We just want to be able to express our views like all citizens."

Jonathan Kay, writing in the National Post, stated that the CAF is "a radicalized embarrassment to Canadian Arabs" and the government was justified in removing its funding. Kay recounted a meeting with Mouammar and a CAF colleague with the National Post editorial board in 2008 during which Kay claimed that the CAF "laid blame for virtually every problem the world faces on Israel—including the alienation of Arab-Canadian children in Canada's public school system." Kay also stated that one of the representatives stated that he had sent his daughter for education overseas "because the inclusion of Israel in Canadian textbooks was too traumatic for her to endure."

Margaret Wente wrote in The Globe and Mail that the CAF should be free to express its opinions but that it should not be entitled to government funding due to its anti-Israel views. The Canadian Jewish Congress (CJC) also supported cutting funding to the CAF, stating that it "has shown poor judgment and disgraceful behaviour." B'nai Brith Canada issued a press release supporting Kenney's proposal, stating that the CAF "has engaged in inflammatory rhetoric, and the promotion of antisemitic and pro-terrorist propaganda."

In a subsequent interview with the Canadian Jewish News (CJN), Kenney again criticized CAF President Mouammar, stating that:

The more Mr. Mouammar... speaks, the more clear it is that he doesn’t speak for the vast majority of Canadians of Arab origin, who are honest, decent, thoughtful, democratic, moderate people; most of whom came to this country seeking life in a stable, liberal democracy, not this kind of shrill, cartoonish voice of extremism that he too often represents.

Regarding the CAF's claim that the funding cuts would damage settlement programs for immigrants, Kenney stated that this was "complete baloney" and that "There are no shortage of worthy organizations out there that can help us deliver solid settlement [programming] without us having to help finance the distribution of Hamas and Palestinian Islamic Jihad videos."

Jim Karygiannis, a Liberal Party Toronto Member of Parliament, criticized Kenney for proposing to cut funding to the CAF and asked parliamentary ethics commissioner, Mary Dawson, to investigate whether Kenney is abusing his position. Karygiannis' complaint stated "I believe for the Minister to use his position and exert undue influence and or in this case instruct his officials to hold funding from such an NGO; this sets a bad precedent which clearly should not be allowed to stand. With this move the Minister sends out a signal to community-based NGOs to toe the line or risk losing their funding." Catherine MacQuarrie, assistant ethics commissioner, said the ethics office will assess Karygiannis' complaint. Kenney's assistant, former American Enterprise Institute lobbyist Alykhan Velshi, responded that Karygiannis' complaint was "ridiculous" and suggested that it was "disturbing" for an MP to stand up for a group that, in Velshi's perspective, had made "anti-semitic" comments. The National Post newspaper, owned by the Asper family's CanWest Global Communications, also criticized Karygiannis, accusing him trying to "[score] political points with the many Arab and other ethnic voters in his riding."

In early March 2009, CAF President Mouammar subsequently stated, in an email to Arab groups, that the CAF was the victim of a "well-planned Zionist campaign." Mouammar wrote that:

The Zionist campaign is being waged by the Canadian Jewish Congress and B'nai Brith supported by some politicians...The campaign of intimidation launched by the Israeli lobby and their supporters is seeking to de-legitimize Arab Canadian institutions, services, access to public funds and to silence all criticism of Israel.

The email sharply criticized Jason Kenney, stating that he had made "inflammatory remarks" which have "inflamed a campaign to marginalize and demonize the already targeted Arab and Muslim Canadian communities." The email concluded with a request for Canadian Prime Minister Stephen Harper to "put an end to his [Jason Kenney's] dangerous campaign of attacking CAF with slanderous and damaging accusations for which he has provided no evidence." Mouammar's letter was later signed by approximately two dozen Arab organizations from across Canada, including the Palestine House, Canadian Lebanese for Dialogue and the Ottawa-based Ahlul Bayt Centre.

The CAF later stated that it is undemocratic and dangerous for a cabinet minister to "bully" an elected president and board of directors. CAF executive director Mohamed Boudjenane stated that he was "amazed" by Kenney's statements and that both sides should "agree to disagree on foreign policy," but that Kenney was "pouring oil on a fire." Mouammar stated that Kenney's threat to cut funding "means a minister of a crown ... depending on the people he likes or dislikes, he will grant taxpayer money for services... I think all settlement agencies should be very concerned with this issue."

In response to the email, a spokesperson from Jason Kenney stated that "this e-mail, by specifically naming the Canadian Jewish Congress and B'nai Brith, again shows he does not just disdain Zionists, but the Jewish community as a whole" and that "It's the ugliest, most vile sort of language. It's not surprising to us that he is again engaged in this sort of reprehensible rhetoric trying to pit community against community." Kenney's office later stated that the groups that signed the letter were "unrepresentative... of the grassroots of the community. Most of them barely exist even on letterhead, some don't have Web sites, or any ongoing operations or programs." Kenney's office specifically noted that the National Council on Canada-Arab Relations and the Islamic Society of North America had not signed the letter and that the groups that did sign represented a "tiny" and "quite radicalised minority" of Arab-Canadian organizations. Kenney also repeated his proposal to cut government funding to the CAF, stating that "Groups that promote hatred and anti-Semitism don't deserve a single red cent of taxpayer support. End of story."

The Canadian Jewish Congress (CJC) stated that Mouammar's accusations were "bizarre" and that the CAF "was a once-proud organization that has turned into nothing but a group whose sheer focus seems to be to attack Jews and Israel."

B'nai Brith Canada stated that Mouammar's accusations "that Jewish groups have co-opted media outlets, such as the National Post, and even the government, to do their bidding smacks of age-old anti-Semitic conspiracy theories." It also stated that "we are Zionists who wear the label proudly. We will continue to oppose each and every effort that seeks to delegitimize the Jewish state and its supporters. We will denounce those voices promoting hate, whether emanating from Canadian universities, unions or from the head of an Arab organization whose mandate to settle newcomers to this country has been seriously put into question."

On March 13, 2009 Kenney gave an interview with the Canwest News Service and Global National in which he stated that a final decision about cutting funding to the CAF will be made soon. Kenney again sharply criticized the CAF, stating that "I can tell you, at my ministry, I have no intention of funding that organization as long as it has the current leadership that apologizes for groups like Hezbollah and Hamas, says they should be able to operate legally, that promotes hateful and extreme views, particularly the most pernicious and durable form of hatred, which is anti-Semitism." He also stated that there are many moderate organizations that can fulfil the projects that were contracted to the CAF. However, he suggested that the threat to cut funding could be removed if more moderate leaders were in place, stating that "I think if the character of the organization were to change and there were to be a leadership of that group that was much more in keeping with our Canadian values, broadly understood, I would be entirely comfortable with them being a service delivery partner of our ministry." Kenney was accompanied to and from the interview by two RCMP bodyguards due to "threat assessment" conducted by the RCMP reportedly concluded that he needs full-time personal security.

The CAF' member organizations issued a statement supporting CAF President Khaled Mouammar, although it did state that Mouammar's accusation that Kenney was a "professional whore" was "unfortunate." Wahida Valiante, President of the Canadian Islamic Congress stated that Kenney should "not use his position to intimidate or pummel his critics and potentially cause enormous collateral damage in the process." She also compared the feud between Kenney and Mouammar to the actions of former Quebec Premier Maurice Duplessis who intervened to arrange the revocation of the liquor license of Frank Roncarelli, an action which was eventually deemed unlawful by the Supreme Court of Canada.

On March 18, 2009 the Rick Stewart, associate assistant deputy minister, operations, sent a letter CAF President Khaled Mouammar which stated that the government will not renew a two-year, $2.1-million contract, which expires at the end of March, for immigrant language instruction provided by the federation. A $473,873 contract for immigrant job search assistance may not be renewed when it expires March 31, 2010, although a final decision on this has not been made. Stewart's letter included a statement from Kenney justifying the decision to halt funding. Kenney wrote that the decision not based solely on Mouammar's description of him as a "professional whore" but rather that:

Serious concerns have arisen with respect to certain public statements that have been made by yourself or other officials of the CAF. These statements have included the promotion of hatred, anti-Semitism and support for the banned terrorist organizations Hamas and Hezbollah. The objectionable nature of these public statements in that they appear to reflect the CAF's evident support for terrorist organizations and positions on its part which are arguably anti-Semitic raises serious questions about the integrity of your organization and has undermined the government's confidence in the CAF as an appropriate partner for the delivery of settlement services to newcomers.

In late March 2009, the CAF announced that it is filing a court challenge against Kenney over his decision to revoke the CAF's federal funding. The CAF court documents stated that Kenney's decision erred in law by breaching an agreement to fund the language programs and also breached the principle of fairness. The CAF is asking the Court to quash the decision and, in the interim, for an injunction to keep the funding coming while the case is heard. The federation being represented by Toronto lawyers Barbara Jackman and Hadayt Nazami

In a later interview, CAF executive director Mohamed Boudjenane stated that Mouammar's comment was misconstrued, explaining that:

A political whore, in the Oxford dictionary, is someone who is willing to sell his political principles for gain. It has nothing to do with the derogatory term.

=== Court ruling on denial of funding ===
In January 2014, Federal Court Justice Russel Zinn upheld the government's decision to halt funding to the CAF. In denying the CAF's challenge to the Government's decision, Zinn wrote that

All of the statements and actions raised by the Minister can, in my view, reasonably lead one to the view that CAF appears to support organizations that Canada has declared to be terrorist organizations and which are arguably anti-Semitic." The government had cited six incidents to support its claims against the CAF; although the CAF insisted that none of these incidents had been authorized or approved by the organization, Zinn ruled that "this defense ignores the maxim that ‘one is known by the company one keeps.

Zinn also wrote that "the CAF cannot completely disassociate itself from the content of web links it includes in its materials, or from comments, distribution of materials, or attendances at meetings and conference by its executives." The court also rejected the CAF's argument that Kenney decision was motivated by the CAF's advocacy for the Palestinians.

Among the incidents cited was the CAF's decision to honour Zafar Bangash, who the court noted "has referred to Canadians as ‘infidels or non-believers’ in the past and reported on the September 11 attacks in a way that was unsympathetic to the victims." The court also noted that the CAF had linked videos of Hamas operatives and displayed the flags of Hamas and Islamic Jihad on their website; both organizations are banned in Canada.

Several Jewish groups, including B'nai Brith Canada and the Centre for Israel and Jewish Affairs, expressed support for the ruling. Kenney later stated that the ruling was "a vindication of common sense" and sent a clear message that "groups who express apparently hateful views or who defend terrorist organizations should not receive taxpayer funding, period. This is especially true for organizations charged with the integration of newcomers."

Following the ruling, CAF national President Dr. Farid Ayad, announced that he would appeal the decision, but declined further comment.

== Statements by Omar Shaban ==
On June 30, 2009, Omar Shaban, CAF's executive vice-president for Western Canada, allegedly wrote on his Facebook page that Canada was a "genocidal state" and referred to Canada's national holiday as "Fuck Canada Day" and added that "It's finally Canada Day...Couldn't be more ashamed to be Canadian." The CAF subsequently released issued a press release disassociating itself from Shaban's comments and stating that his words "in no way reflect of CAF nor its feelings towards Canada." Mohamed Boudjenane, the CAF's executive director, later stated that Shaban's comments were a "stupid faux pas." Shaban, who refused to back down from his comments, subsequently resigned from the CAF.

== Opposition to Canada's Membership on the UN Security Council ==
In September 2010, CAF President Khaled Mouammar released a statement (which was later published by Al-Jazeerah), calling for "all Arab and Muslim Missions at the United Nations to vote against Canada's bid to have a seat at the UN Security Council." Mouammar stated that "The evidence has been accumulating about the anti-Arab and anti-Islamic Canadian government [of Conservative Prime Minister Stephen Harper] to the extent it is feared that if Canada gains a seat in the UN Security Council, it may be used against Arabs and Muslims around the world." Mouammar concluded by stating "granting Canada a seat on the UN Security Council would be tantamount to rewarding Canada for discriminating against Arab and Muslim Canadians, and for its unconditional and blatant support for Israel’s war crimes and violations of international law."

In addition, Mouammar also circulated an email which linked to an article in The Tyee by author Murray Dobbin, which accused Canada, among other things, of working closely with Colombia, which is "virtually a U.S. military base," and that Canadian rescue efforts in Haiti following the 2010 Haiti earthquake are in fact a "neo-colonial effort." Matt Gurney, writing in the National Post, criticised the CAF endorsing Dobbin's "anti-Canadian position" and wrote that "Dobbin’s anti-Canadian views are music to their [the CAF's] ears." B'nai Brith Canada also criticized Mouammar, stating that "Despite purporting to be advocates of Canadian values, the Canadian Arab Federation actively lobbied against their country thereby attempting to shame and divide Canada."
