= Canadian Muslim Union =

Islamic organization based in Canada

- Abbreviation: CMU
- Formation: 20 August 2006
- Location: Canada

The Canadian Muslim Union (CMU) is a registered not-for-profit corporation in Canada.

The CMU was started on August 20, 2006 following an unsuccessful attempt to resolve deep divisions in the Muslim Canadian Congress (MCC) board. The attempt failed when members representing one of the factions did not show up for the Board meeting called to resolve the differences and to elect a new executive. The board members who attended, which included all of the executive (including El-Farouk Khaki) and a majority of the total board from the Toronto area (including Gary Dale), decided unanimously to resign from the MCC and form a new, democratic organization.

The CMU, while advocating separation of Religion and State, works with and within the Muslim community, engaging it in issues of human rights, human dignity, social justice and alternate progressive and inclusive visions of Islam. In doing so, it aims to instill joy in the celebration of identities as Muslims and as Canadians with social consciences & a commitment to social justice.

The CMU has hosted a number of events including several mixed-gender woman-led Friday afternoon prayers and has co-sponsored a "Peace Iftar" with Salaam each Ramadan since 2006. They have also partnered with other groups for various events such as public forums with Tariq Ali on October 15, 2006 and November 14, 2008.

The CMU also was one of many groups who presented a position statement to the Ontario Citizens' Assembly on Electoral Reform in 2007. They endorsed some form of proportional representation as a key to electing a more representative government.
