= Canadian Islamic Congress =

Former Islamic organization based in Canada

The Canadian Islamic Congress (CIC) was a Canadian Muslim non-profit organization.

The group was founded by Mohamed Elmasry of the University of Waterloo, a world expert in microchip design, with a 1994 meeting of Muslim leaders from across the country and it was formally incorporated as a non-profit organization in 1998.

== Issues ==
=== Israeli-Palestinian Conflict ===
In March 2006, the CIC issued a communique in which it condemned the government of Stephen Harper for "blindly following the lead of Washington and of the influential pro-Israel Jewish lobby in both countries."

The CIC called Canada's withdrawal of all aid and support to the Gaza Strip "a resounding slap in the face to Canadian values... It makes a mockery of our traditional stand as a nation concerned with peace and justice." The CIC also stated that in refusing to recognize the Hamas government elected in the Palestinian territories, "Prime Minister Harper and his government are saying loudly and clearly that Canada no longer cares about the plight of Palestine and Palestinians ... This is beyond hypocrisy; it is a shameful devaluation of Canada's international reputation for fair-minded, ethical and constructive diplomacy."

In January 2008, the Canadian Islamic Congress and the Canadian Arab Federation issued a media communique which stated "the Apartheid regime of the Jewish state escalated its genocidal crimes against the indigenous people of Palestine" and that "Palestinians continue to endure death, deprivation and destruction under more than 40 years of brutal Israeli occupation that has become an insidious and unremitting genocide." The communique concluded by stating that "The world can no longer afford to stand by and watch from the sidelines as an entire people slowly bleeds to death."

=== 2008 essay contest ===
In 2008 the Canadian Islamic Congress and the Canadian Arab Federation (CAF) launched an essay contest that "invites Canadian high school and university students (ages 17 through 27) to write an essay on the theme "The Ethnic Cleansing of Palestine" and is part of activities commemorating the 60th anniversary of Al Nakba - the ethnic cleansing of Palestinians from their homeland in 1947-48." Bnai Brith Canada, a Canadian Jewish Organization, criticized the contest, stating that it is a "blatant propagandistic initiative that distorts reality, delegitimizing the existence of the Jewish state in any shape or form. The national essay contest announced by these groups encouraging youth to write on "Ethnic Cleansing of Palestine", is based on the false assumption that the Jewish presence in the Jewish People's ancestral homeland is illegal" and that "This sham of a contest joins together Canadian-Arab groups, which purport to reflect mainstream positions, but which clearly hold extremist notions that deny Israel's right to exist."

The Canadian Islamic Congress and the Canadian Arab Federation (CAF) criticized B'nai B'rith Canada, stating that "This call to shutdown academic research and free speech is typical of B’nai Brith's contempt for the basic principles of academic institutions. These tactics of intimidation are becoming an all too common refrain of pro- Israel organizations, and are simply designed to stem the growing public awareness of Israel's apartheid policies" and that "Israel was founded upon the ethnic cleansing of the Palestinian people. Between 1947 and 1948, nearly 800,000 Palestinians were expelled from their homes and lands and over 500 Palestinian villages and neighborhoods were destroyed, and their inhabitants prevented from ever returning to their homeland."

=== Relations with non-Muslims ===
The CIC has established "Canadian Islam Awareness Week" held each October in an effort to improve understanding of the Muslim community by non-Muslims. It has also worked with mosques across the country to organize "open houses" each fall where non-Muslim neighbours are invited into mosques. It has also lobbied provincial education ministries to make a high school course on world religions compulsory. Explaining the initiative, CIC vice-president Valiante said "We don't want schools to preach our religion, but we live in a complex world and religions play a large role, young people need to be given a chance to understand them."

=== National Post ===
==== CIC criticism ====
Since 1998, the CIC has been active monitoring media coverage for anti-Muslim or anti-Islam sentiment and has issued reports highlighting its findings. It has opposed the use of phrases such as "Islamic guerrillas", "Islamic insurgency" and "Muslim militants" saying that terms like "militant" or "terrorist" should be used without a religious association "since no religion teaches or endorses terrorism, militancy or extremism. Although, the rise of major terrorist attacks by groups who claim they are waging a holy war on the west confuses this issue as the reasons behind their attacks comes from the base of their faith. and" The Congress has singled out the National Post as being "consistently is No. 1" as an anti-Islam media outlet.

==== Response from the National Post ====
A number of writers for the National Post have subsequently criticized the CIC over accusations that it is anti-Islam. Alexander Rose, wrote that "judging by its [CIC's] support for the [2001] Durban Conference, during which hook-nosed Jews were equated with apartheid and genocide, the CIC doesn't seem to have problems with some kinds of truly inflammatory racist language" and that the CIC's "fetish for censorship in the interest of "social harmony", as the CIC puts it, reeks of the very authoritarianism oppressing Muslims in Egypt, Iraq, Iran, and Saudi Arabia." In addition, Rose stated that "By editing out bad language, it seems, the CIC believes that correct thoughts will result, even at the necessary expense of reporting the truth." Robert Fulford wrote that the CIC "justifies its existence mainly by complaining about acts of prejudice that haven't happened" and that "it's ridiculous to suggest that we avoid the subject of religion when crimes are committed in the name of that religion by men and women considered part of it." while Jonathan Kay wrote that "the folks at the Canadian Islamic Congress purport to be the arbiters of what can and can't be said in this country" and that CIC President Elmasry is "the country's self-appointed judge of all that is hateful."

=== Statement and apology to Daniel Pipes ===
In the April 29, 2005 edition of the Friday Bulletin, CIC VP Wahida C. Valiante wrote that Daniel Pipes, a Conservative American political commentator, "is a follower of Hitler", "uses the tactics of Hitler" and "wants to ethnically cleanse America of its Muslim presence." Pipes denied he ever made these statements and subsequently filed a notice of libel. The CIC subsequently apologized "without reservation" and "retract[ed the] remarks in the column." The CIC also sent funds to cover Pipes' legal expenses and made a donation in his name to a Canadian charity. Pipes stated that the CIC's apology establishes that, in Canada, "Islamist groups do not have impunity to fabricate lies about their opponents."

=== Human Rights complaint against Maclean's ===
In December 2007, the CIC launched complaints with the Canadian Human Rights Commission, British Columbia Human Rights Commission and the Ontario Human Rights Commission against Maclean's Magazine accusing the magazine of publishing 18 articles between January 2005 and July 2007 that they considered Islamophobic in nature including a column by Mark Steyn titled "The Future of Islam". According to the CIC complaint, Maclean's is "flagrantly Islamophobic" and "subjects Canadian Muslims to hatred and contempt." In April, 2008 the Ontario Human Rights Commission (OHRC) stated that it did not have jurisdiction to hear the complaint based on a gap in the legislation (the relevant portions of Ontario Human Rights Code only address discrimination via signs or symbols, not printed material). Despite not having jurisdiction, the Commission published a statement condemning the articles published by Maclean's as "xenophobic", "destructive", "Islamophobic" and "promoting prejudice". The Commission indicated that more discussion on the topic of Islamophobia in the media was warranted. The British Columbia Human Rights Commission heard the complaint in June 2008. The complaint was later dismissed. The Federal Human Rights Commission also dismissed the complaint.

At the Niagara-on-the-Lake conference of the Canadian Association of Statutory Human Rights Agencies in June 2008, Wahida C. Valiante, national vice-president of the Canadian Islamic Congress, compared Mark Steyn to James Keegstra, an Alberta high school teacher who taught and tested his students on how Jews "created the Holocaust to gain sympathy. They basically talk about the same theories. This is not a civil dialogue." She said that, in Germany, long before the Holocaust, "it was the words that set the stage for what happened later on.... We may end up with the same fate, and that is at the heart of why [the complainants] wanted to take this on."

=== Opposition to extremism ===
The organization has warned Muslim parents to monitor the on-line habits of teenagers and discourage membership in foreign political organizations or preoccupation with religious rituals. It has also cautioned mosques to be on the alert against infiltration of the congregation by "foreign Muslim groups who may have hidden agendas."

It has distributed a brochure warning that "some misguided Muslims may try to recruit Canadian Muslims, especially our young people, and use them to commit crimes against our country, or abroad" and urged the community to reject "extremist imported ideologies".

The CIC urged a moderate response to Danish cartoons of the Islamic prophet Muhammad published in 2005. Anger at the depictions resulted in violent rallies and attacks on Danish institutions in Europe and the Muslim world. Elmasry urged Canadian Muslims to have a "controlled and calm" response consisting of writing letters to the editor and the Danish government. He also urged Muslims to engage in outreach by inviting non-Muslims into their homes and have open houses in mosques. He discouraged attendance at demonstrations saying that "[d]uring demonstrations, you don't have control of who will do what. Opposing sides who are anti-Muslim or supporters of freedom of expression could show up and a shouting match can turn violent. Instead, we've encouraged a more proactive approach to plead with the government to recognize anti-Islam the way it does anti-Semitism."

=== War in Afghanistan ===
The CIC called for Canada's military mission in Afghanistan to end in 2009 and for Canada to urge the United Nations to sponsor a peace conference involving all parties.

=== Veiled voters ===
The CIC has opposed a proposed law by the federal Conservative government that would require all voters to show their faces before being allowed to cast ballots. The proposal is a response to Elections Canada issuing a directive to poll clerks to permit women wearing veils for religious reasons to vote. The CIC states that the proposed Tory law is unnecessary and will only promote discrimination against Muslims and provide "political mileage among Islamophobes."

=== Canadian Anti-Terrorism Act, 2001 ===
In 2007, the CIC voiced its opposition to proposals to renew provisions of the 2001 Canadian Anti-Terrorism Act allowing investigative hearings and preventive arrests which had lapsed in early 2006. Speaking on behalf of the conference, Elmasry said "We object to any special courts that deal specifically with terror activities, because at the end of the day it will compromise the civil liberties of Canadians."

=== Sharia tribunals ===
The Canadian Islamic Congress supported recommendations by Marion Boyd that the government of Ontario permit sharia tribunals to which Muslims could voluntarily submit civil disputes and whose findings would then have legal weight under the Arbitration Act. The proposal was opposed by the Muslim Canadian Congress, the Canadian Council of Muslim Women and non-Muslim women's groups. The provincial government ended up rejecting the proposal and scrapping existing religious arbitration tribunals for Jews and Christians in the process.

The CIC raised controversy when CIC President Elmasry wrote that Canadian Muslims " [should] not to make a cause of publicly deriding their religion, badmouthing the Prophet, ridiculing the Qur'an and mounting uninformed crusades to smear their Islamic Law, the Shariah."

In the aftermath, the Muslim Canadian Congress demanded that the CIC apologize for "false" accusations that those who criticize sharia are "smearing Islam, ridiculing the Koran [and] badmouthing Muhammad." The MCC stated that CIC President Elmasry accused the group of blasphemy, a crime that carries the death sentence in several Islamic countries, leading some MCC members to fear they will be arrested if they travel certain Islamic countries.."

Arif Raza, MCC's lawyer wrote that "Your [Elmasry's] false and utterly irresponsible accusations of blasphemy have exposed these active, dynamic and prominent members of the Canadian Muslim community and their families to enormously dangerous consequences" and that "you [Elmasry] have defamed their good reputation and exposed them to ridicule and hatred within their own communities in Canada."

Elmasry responded by stating that Islam has no punishment for denouncing the religion, its holy book or the Prophet Mohammed, and he dismissed as "nonsense" the notion that his words could be construed as a death sentence.

=== Public funding of faith-based schools ===
The Congress expressed support for Ontario Progressive Conservative Party leader John Tory's proposal during the 2007 Ontario provincial election campaign to publicly fund faith-based schools arguing that rejecting the proposal would signify a retreat from multiculturalism. The proposal, which was also supported by Jewish and some Christian groups, proved unpopular with the electorate and is cited as a key reason for the Conservative party's defeat in the election.

=== Support for Hezbollah and Hamas ===
During the 2006 conflict between Israel and Hezbollah, the Canadian Islamic Congress and the Canadian Arab Federation urged the Canadian government to take Hezbollah and Hamas off its list of designated terrorist organizations. CIC president Elmasry wrote that the Canadian Government should "review its 2002 decision to place Hezbollah and Hamas on its list of banned alleged terrorist organizations" because doing so "is an unconscionable act of hypocrisy and a mockery of justice" since Canada has not placed Israel on the same list. Elmasry also stated that the decision to place Hezbollah and Hamas on this list was "dictated by special interest groups with agendas that are contrary to peace with justice."

=== Islamophobia ===
The CIC has been outspoken in its criticism of a perceived increase in Islamophobia since the September 11, 2001 attacks. It has accused governments and school boards of failing to address harassment and discrimination against Muslims and Arabs and has called for the province of Ontario to launch a public inquiry. At a press conference at Queen's Park, CIC official Wahida C. Valiante said that "Islamophobia does exist and it's growing." and that "[s]ince 9/11, there has been no effort on behalf of the Ontario government, including the Ministry of Education, to have a comprehensive policy to address the growing isolation and marginalization of Muslim and Arab youth."

=== Claim that "Pro-Israeli Zionists" are "Playing Manipulative Mind-Games" ===
In 2006, CIC Vice-President Wahida C. Valiante criticized "pro-Israeli Zionists... promote fear of Islam and Muslims through propaganda, and by playing manipulative mind- games on unsuspecting, decent mainstream Canadian and Americans." She also wrote that "the Zionist zealots (neo-conservative Likud Party supporters who yoke Israel's interests to those of America) and rightwing evangelical "millennial" or end-time Christians, both raise the spectre of "Islamic terrorism" as a force that threatens free people everywhere. They know that fear destroys reason, leaving the individual's conscience in the hands of those who instill the fear." She also wrote that "Similarly, Fascism and Zionism achieved their objectives through fear."

== Controversies ==
=== Mohamed Elmasry's appearance on The Michael Coren Show ===
On October 19, 2004 CIC President Mohamed Elmasry appeared in a panel discussion on The Michael Coren Show to discuss the topic of "What is a terrorist?". During an exchange with the show's host, he stated that anyone in Israel over the age of 18 was a justifiable target of Palestinian attacks. He also criticized the recent bombing of hotels in Taba, Egypt on the grounds that some of the victims there were not Israelis. At first, Elmasry defended his remarks by insisting that he was merely sharing the standard Palestinian point of view. This led to further charges from his critics, who accused him of using the Palestinians as a scapegoat. In a letter to the Toronto Star, he denied having said what he was reported to have said. These remarks prompted harshly-worded responses from representatives of the Canadian Jewish Congress and several prominent Canadian Muslims. Elmasry later apologized for his remarks calling them his "biggest mistake" in 30 years of public life and offered his resignation which was not accepted by the CIC's board.

The Elmasry affair led to criticisms that the media focused entirely on the comments of the CIC president while neglecting controversial comments made on the same program by a B'nai B'rith official, Adam Aptowitzer, who stated that "When Israel uses terror ... to destroy a home and convince people ... to be terrified of what the possible consequences are, I'd say that's an acceptable use to terrify somebody." The remarks only received attention several weeks after the broadcast, and after Elmasry's apology and proffered resignation, when a press release by the Canadian Arab Federation highlighted them. Following the CAF press release, Aptowitzer retracted his comments and resigned his position with the B'nai B'rith. Toronto Star city editor John Ferri told the Toronto Star's ombud, Don Sellar, "we all had egg on our faces... it was embarrassing for every paper in the city not to get the whole story from the outset."

In a letter to the Toronto Star following Sellar's column, Elmasary complained about the affair:

Canadian news media – including the Star – launched a relentless and unfair attack against the Canadian Islamic Congress (CIC) and me while covering up for weeks the outrageous statements made on the same show by Adam Aptowitzer, then the Ontario chairman of the B'nai Brith Institute of International Affairs. While never referring to Aptowitzer's statements, the media used news stories, editorials, op-ed pieces, columns, photos, front-page coverage, cartoons, and radio and television commentaries to paint a negative picture of CIC and myself which seriously distorts and falsifies the truth. It was widely reported, for example, that "Elmasry said all Israelis over 18 were legitimate targets for suicide bombers." This is totally false.

The media never questioned the completeness or the accuracy of the radio show transcript that was given to them. Instead, they totally and completely relied on the heavily selective one provided to them, which was one-sided and referred only to my remarks, but not to those by Aptowitzer.

=== Wahida C. Valiante's "chosen people" op-ed ===
In an article written in February 2003, CIC Vice President Wahida C. Valiante wrote:

Unfortunately, the Jewish idea of being "chosen" not only institutionalized racism, but also set a terrible precedent for human history in general, where racial superiority claims became the norm, the divisive standard by which all others, those not like us were to be judged and treated.

Rachael Turkienicz, a professor of Jewish studies and education and an officer of Canadian Jewish Congress's Ontario region, wrote, in a letter to Valiante, that she had "badly misinterpreted the concept of 'the chosen people', which in fact refers to the relationship between Jews and God and that 'It certainly does not connote "racial superiority'". Turkienicz said, "The article was guilty of deploying "a purportedly anti-racist message in the cause of its own prejudice."

After the Canadian Jewish Congress complained, Valiente sent the organization a letter acknowledging that her interpretation of the term "chosen people" was "inconsistent with its meaning in the scriptures of the Old Testament."

== See also ==
- National Council of Canadian Muslims
- Islam in Canada
- Islamic Society of North America
- Islamic Supreme Council of Canada
