= Sultaana Freeman =

American woman who sued the state of Florida (born 1967)

Sultaana Lakiana Myke Freeman (born 1967) is a Muslim American, resident in the state of Florida. She garnered media attention and notoriety when she sued the state of Florida over the right to wear a face veil for her driver's license picture.

== Background ==
Born as Sandra Michele Keller in Washington, D.C. in 1967, she attended school in Decatur, Illinois. In 1985, she enrolled at Millikin University in Decatur, Illinois, graduating in 1989 with a degree in Commercial Music and a Business Administration minor. Later in 1989, she began employment at a utility company which lasted for a ten-year period, in which she was an engineering assistant. She converted to Islam in January 1997, initially only wearing the headscarf, but, by the end of the year, donning the full face veil (niqab). She married Mark Freeman, also known as Abdul Malik Freeman, on October 14, 1997, in Champaign County, Illinois. In December 1997, she obtained an Illinois driver's license with the veil, to reflect her new appearance.

== Timeline ==
1997

- January - Converts to Islam
- August - Legally changes her forename to "Sultaana"
- October - Meets and marries Abdul-Maalik Freeman
- December - Obtains an Illinois driver's license wearing the face veil in the photo and begins regularly veiling her face while working and elsewhere in public

2001

- February - Sultaana Freeman obtains a Florida driver's license wearing the face veil in the photo
- November/December - Freeman receives two letters demanding her to unveil for a new photo or her current license will be cancelled before expiring

2002

- Jan. 7 - Freeman's license is cancelled
- Jan. 21 - Freeman's lawsuit is filed, represented by lawyer Howard Marks and the American Civil Liberties Union (ACLU)
- June 25 - Plaintiff's Response to Defendant's Motion to Dismiss
- June 27 - Orange County Circuit Judge Ted Coleman denies a motion by the state to dismiss Freeman's lawsuit

2003

- May 27–29 - Freeman vs DMV trial takes place in Orlando residing under Circuit Court Judge Janet C. Thorpe
- June 6 - Janet C. Thorpe rules against Freeman
- July 3 - Freeman appeals
- Oct 31- Freeman files Appellate briefs; awaiting a response from Defendant by the end of the year

2004

- June 9 - Appellate Court Oral arguments

== Florida lawsuit ==
In 2002, Freeman filed a religious discrimination lawsuit against Florida when the state's Department of Highway Safety suspended her license when she refused to be re-photographed without her veil. Her legal license was suspended without change in policy or law following the September 11, 2001 attacks. Her lawsuit argued that her religious beliefs required her to wear a veil "in front of strangers and unrelated males". It also stated that other states allowed photo-free licenses for religious reasons. Judge Janet C. Thorpe denied her lawsuit that year, and a state appeals court later upheld Thorpe's ruling.

It emerged during trial by Assistant Attorney General Jason Vail that pictures of Freeman's uncovered face had already been taken by government authorities in Illinois when she was arrested for battering a child. In 1998, she and her husband hesitated when medical staff at a hospital asked to examine twin 3-year-old girls, described as in “Muslim attire”, in their foster care. Freeman and her husband apparently objected to any examination of the girls on the grounds that any such exam would violate their religious beliefs. One of the girls had a broken arm, and both had numerous bruises and marks on their bodies. The Freemans did take the girls to the hospital because of their injury.

The arrest not only resulted in Freeman's mugshot being taken without veil, but also in her conviction for aggravated battery and a sentence of 18 months probation.

In 1999, Freeman again posed for a police mugshot in connection with her husband's arrest on July 4. She was not charged but her husband was later convicted of reckless discharge of a handgun and sentenced to probation. Mazen Sukkar, a Lebanese-born immigration attorney, told the Fort Lauderdale Sun-Sentinel: "This is not Muhammad Ali refusing to kill during a war. This is one individual who wants to practice her religion and undermine the whole idea of identification."

== See also ==
- Hijab
- Niqab
