= Michael Coren =

British-Canadian television personality (1959)

The Reverend Michael Coren
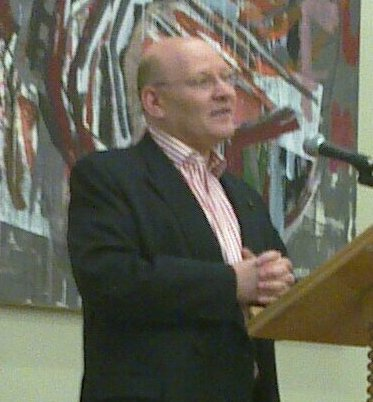
- Coren in 2010
- Born: 15 January 1959 (age 67); Walthamstow, East London, England
- Education: University of Nottingham; City University, London; Trinity College, Toronto
- Occupations: Author; columnist; talk show host
- Notable work: As I See It; C.S. Lewis: The Man Who Created Narnia; Why Catholics Are Right; J.R.R. Tolkien: The Man Who Created the Lord of the Rings
- Spouse: Bernadette (m. 1987)
- Children: 4
- Relatives: Alan Coren (cousin); Giles Coren (first cousin once removed); Victoria Coren Mitchell (first cousin once removed)
- Website: www.michaelcoren.com

Michael Coren (born 15 January 1959) is a British-Canadian writer and clergyman. A long-time television personality, Coren hosted The Michael Coren Show on the Crossroads Television System from 1999 to 2011 before moving to the Sun News Network to host The Arena with Michael Coren, from 2011 until the channel's demise in early 2015. He has also been a long-time radio personality, particularly on Toronto talk radio station CFRB. Coren is currently a columnist for iPolitics.

He has written more than ten books, including biographies of G. K. Chesterton, H. G. Wells, Arthur Conan Doyle, J. R. R. Tolkien and C. S. Lewis. His latest books are Heresy: Ten Lies They Spread About Christianity (2012), The Future of Catholicism (2013), Epiphany: A Christian's Change of Heart & Mind over Same-Sex Marriage (2016) and The Rebel Christ (2021).

== Life and career ==
Coren was born in Walthamstow, at the time in Essex, England, of Jewish heritage, and raised secular. After obtaining a degree in politics from the University of Nottingham, he moved from Britain to Canada in 1987. For several years, he was a columnist for Frank and then The Globe and Mail, before he began syndicated columns for the Financial Post and Sun Media in 1995. Following his departure from Frank, he became a favourite target of that publication, culminating in a spoof ad contest to "deflower" Michael Coren (a nod to Frank's notorious "Deflower Caroline Mulroney" contest, and a satirical jab at Coren's conservative leanings.) Coren had also been a favourite target of Frank back in the days before he began writing for them. Coren took exception to being labelled a "literary prostitute" during a 1994 interview.

His career as a broadcaster began in the early 1990s when he co-hosted a political debate segment with Irshad Manji on TVOntario's Studio 2. In the 1990s and 2000s, Coren was alleged to have spoken objectionably about people with AIDS. In 1994, the Ryerson Review of Journalism reported Coren's response to an interview question about the disease:

"What I do is attack something like a double standard on AIDS. Sure, we must find a cure for AIDS, we must put enormous amounts of money into it...” he pauses. "Look, people are dying all over. When it was blacks in Africa dying of AIDS, no one gave a toss. Nobody gave a toss. Suddenly, it's middle-class men in California and everyone goes crazy about it. It's a double standard. I'm trying to provoke people into rethinking comfortable points of view".

In 1995, he began an evening talk show on CFRB. In 1999, Coren briefly moved to Talk 640 for a short stint as its morning man. He returned to CFRB, where he hosted a show from 6:30 to 8:00 p.m. weekday nights, and regularly filled in for other hosts until November 2005. Coren was dismissed by CFRB as a result of complaints arising from comments ridiculing the weight of an apparent guest. In fact, the guest was an actor and the segment was scripted. According to CFRB's Operations Manager, Steve Kowch, "Pat Holiday, our general manager and myself went through the tape of Monday night's show and were shocked ... it was totally out of bounds." Coren argues that it was a satire comparing in his mind public attitude to third world starvation with North America's obsession with slimming and self-indulgence.

Despite this acrimonious termination, Coren made regular talk show appearances on CFRB in July 2006, at the start of the 2006 Israel–Lebanon conflict, as he happened to be in Israel at the time. In 2006, Coren wrote a franker newspaper piece in Toronto Sun, questioning "Why is AIDS so special?":

At its most simple, stop fornicating. There, I've said it. One of the things that can end a career in North American media. Yet it's true. AIDS in the West is still overwhelmingly a threat to male homosexuals and intravenous drug users. It's now found in other groups, but it has taken years for that to happen and they still represent the minority of sufferers. More than this, the bulk of the newly infected tend to be people who have contracted the virus through permissive sexual practices.

In September 2006, Coren published an article in the Toronto Sun supporting the use of tactical nuclear strikes against Iran. This position was retracted the following year. As of 22 April 2007, the show expanded from its usual one-hour slot at 7–8 pm to 7–9 pm. In the fall of 2007 he and former Liberal Party of Canada president Stephen LeDrew launched a daily hour-long afternoon show on CFRB called Two Bald Guys With Strong Opinions in which the two argue about the issues of the day. After the departure of LeDrew, Coren was joined by Tarek Fatah after several on air auditions by potential replacement co-hosts. Coren was again let go by CFRB along with 12 other staff of the Toronto radio station on 27 August 2009.

On television, Coren hosted the Michael Coren Show on the Crossroads Television System until June 2011 when he left to join the Sun News Network where he hosted The Arena with Michael Coren weeknights beginning 30 August 2011. Coren also had a newspaper column published every Saturday in the Sun newspaper chain until February 2015. He has been a columnist for the Western Standard, Catholic Insight and The Women's Post and has contributed to National Post, Reader's Digest and several other publications. A self-professed Tottenham Hotspur fan, he has appeared as a guest host on The Score's The Footy Show.

Following the demise of Sun News Network in February 2015, Coren briefly joined The Rebel Media, an online platform founded by Ezra Levant originally known as The Rebel Media and since renamed to Rebel News, but left the venture after a week.

Following his conversion to Anglicanism, Coren began to publicly embrace socially liberal ideas such as support for same-sex marriage. He stated that it negatively affected his career and that he became the target of personal attacks from former readers, observing that "there is none so angry as a fundamentalist scorned". In a 2015 interview Coren estimated that he lost $35,000 a year in income from lost speaking fees and his former recurring columns for Sun Media newspapers, Crossroads Christian Communications properties, The Catholic Register, and other conservative Christian publications. He also stated that contrition is a major aspect of his conversion and he regrets "so much of what [he] said, especially the tone" in his earlier career. Coren was ordained a transitional deacon in the Anglican Diocese of Niagara on 20 October 2019.

Coren is also a public speaker, particularly at religious gatherings.

== Religious views ==
Coren's articles and speeches often include stories of his own personal spiritual journey. Coren's father was Jewish as was his maternal grandfather, while his maternal grandmother came from a family of Welsh coal miners and converted to Judaism. Coren's father and uncle were cab drivers. Coren has said that his father's family left Poland in the 1890s, a few decades before The Holocaust. He said "People have called me an anti-Semite. I thought it quite rich since my father's family was massacred in the Holocaust". Michael Coren was profiled on Credo on Vision TV, and said that his father told him he could not attend his son's wedding in a Catholic church without becoming "physically sick".

He converted to Catholic Christianity in 1984 while still living in England, later saying that he "converted to an institution."

He left Catholicism for Evangelicalism in the 1990s, after a conversion experience, greatly influenced by Canadian televangelist Terry Winter. In 1991, Coren said in a column for a humour magazine: "Evangelicals may be intolerant, small-minded, and repellent, but at least they hold a consistent set of beliefs". In a 1993 book review, he said "Can anyone imagine a detective priest? Regrettably, it is easier to conjure up the image of a priest being questioned by secular detectives over abuse charges." Also in 1993, he had a falling out with the Catholic Church over an unflattering profile he wrote of Archbishop Aloysius Ambrozic for Toronto Life magazine. The bishop, who had made Coren a Knight of the Holy Sepulchre in October 1992, was quoted using words including "friggin" and "bitch", and said that the Spanish dictator Francisco Franco was a "conservative Catholic and not a bad fellow". Coren defended himself, saying "He's an archbishop and he was vulgar ... obviously what thousands of Catholics expected me to do was lie. I still get hate mail about the article."

After this incident, Coren said that he did not consider himself a Catholic anymore. He said, "My wife is Catholic and the children will be raised Catholic, but that's it. It's just not there for me." Daniel Richler observed that Coren loves scandal, but hates having it come his way. In one of his columns for the satirical humour magazine Frank, Michael Coren depicted Mother Teresa getting drunk in a bar.

In early 2004, he embraced Catholicism again. He cites Thomas More, C. S. Lewis, Ronald Knox and his godfather Lord Longford as spiritual influences, and remains connected to the ecumenical scene in Canada and beyond.

In 2014, Michael Coren once again left the Catholic Church and began worshipping with the Anglican Church of Canada, being formally received into the communion the next year. In an interview with the National Post on 1 May 2015, he cited the Catholic Church's teachings on homosexuality and contraception as some of the reasons for his conversion to Anglicanism.

In contrast to his previous views, Coren now identifies as a Christian socialist. Coren supports infant circumcision, which he calls a "tradition [Jews and Muslims] consider holy and essential, based not in abuse and cruelty, but in concern and love for their child", and has said that its opponents are "irreligious zealots".

Coren is a priest of the Anglican Diocese of Niagara. He was ordained deacon in October 2019, and ordained priest in September 2021. He serves as associate priest of St. Luke's, Burlington.

== Personal life ==
Coren is a cousin of author and journalist Alan Coren, and is thus related to Alan's children Victoria Coren Mitchell and Giles Coren.

Coren married his wife, Bernadette, in 1987. They have four children.

== Published books ==
- Theatre Royal: 100 Years of Stratford East (1985) ISBN 0-7043-2474-1
- Gilbert: The Man Who Was G. K. Chesterton (1990) ISBN 1-55778-256-3
- The Invisible Man: The Life and Liberties of H. G. Wells (1993) ISBN 0-689-12119-9
- The Life of Sir Arthur Conan Doyle (1993) ISBN 0-7475-1229-9
- The Man Who Created Narnia: The Story of C. S. Lewis (1994) ISBN 1-895555-78-7
- Setting It Right (1996) ISBN 0-7737-2940-2
- J. R. R.Tolkien: The Man who Created the Lord of the Rings (2001) ISBN 0-7522-6156-8
- As I See It (2009) ISBN 0-9812767-0-9
- Why Catholics Are Right (2011) ISBN 0-7710-2321-9
- Heresy: Ten Lies They Spread About Christianity (2012) ISBN 978-0771023156
- The Future of Catholicism (2013) ISBN 0771023510
- Hatred: Islam's War on Christianity (2014) ISBN 0771023847
- Epiphany: A Christian's Change of Heart & Mind over Same-Sex Marriage (2016) ISBN 0771024118
- The Rebel Christ (2021) ISBN 978-1459748514
