= Tarek Fatah =

Pakistani-Canadian journalist and author (1949–2023)

- طارق فتح
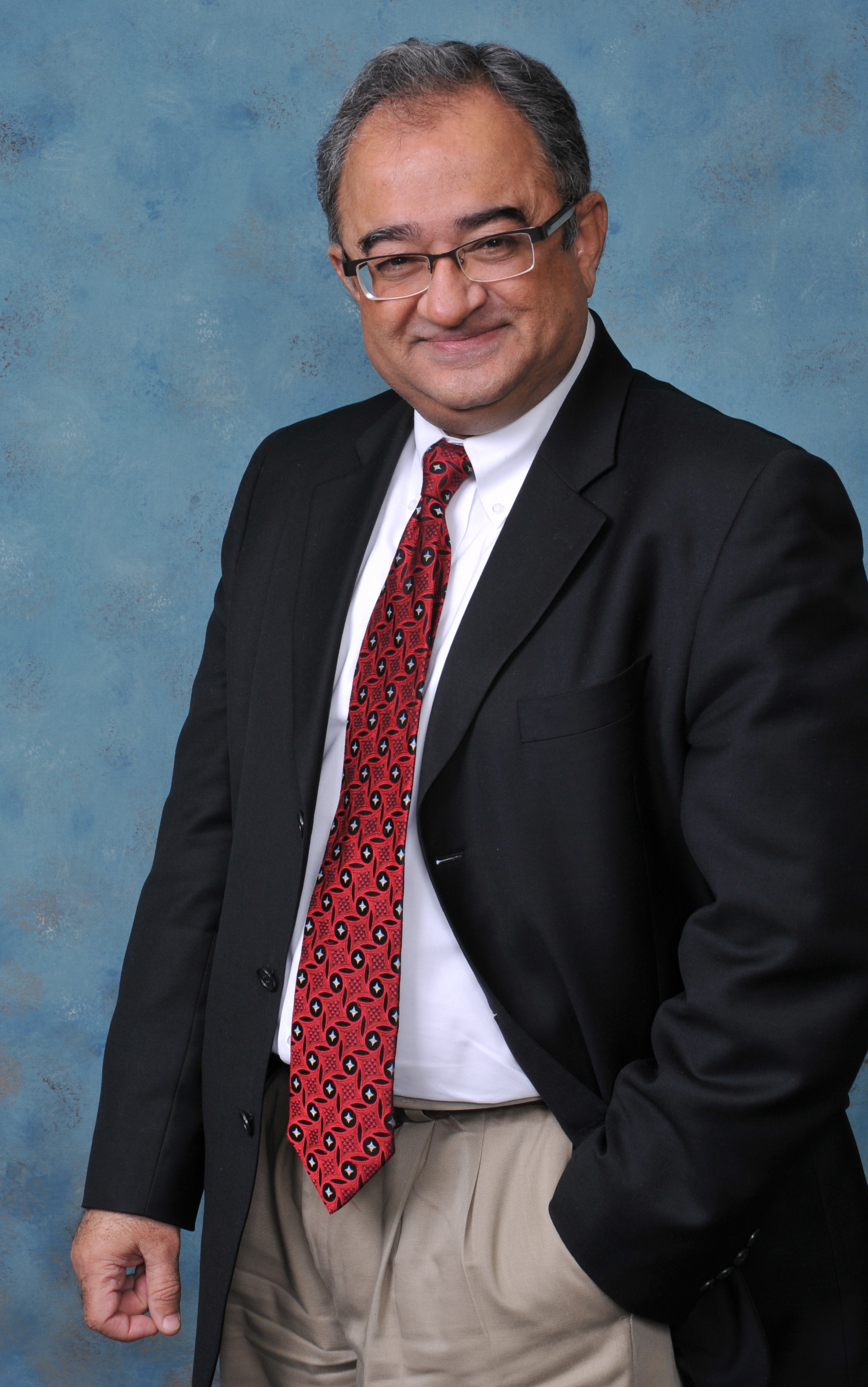
- Fatah in 2009
- Born: 20 November 1949; Karachi, Federal Capital Territory, Dominion of Pakistan
- Died: 24 April 2023 (aged 73); Toronto, Ontario, Canada
- Citizenship: Canadian
- Education: University of Karachi
- Occupations: Political activist; writer; broadcaster
- Spouse: Nargis Tapal
- Children: 2, including Natasha
- Writing career
- Period: 1996–2023
- Genre: Non-fiction
- Subjects: Religion; politics
- Notable awards: Donner Prize; Helen and Stan Vine Canadian Book Award
- Website: Official website

Tarek Fatah (Punjabi: طارق فتح; [t̪aɾɪk fətah] / [fəteh] 20 November 1949 – 24 April 2023) was a Pakistani-Canadian journalist and author. He was a Punjabi born into Islam and was a vocal critic of the Pakistani religious and political establishment, and the partition of India.

== Early life ==
Fatah was born on 20 November 1949 in Karachi, Pakistan into a Punjabi family which had migrated from Bombay to Karachi following the Partition of India in 1947. Fatah graduated with a degree in biochemistry from the University of Karachi but entered into journalism as a reporter for the Karachi Sun in 1970, before becoming an investigative journalist for Pakistan Television. He was a leftist student leader in the 1960s and 1970s and was imprisoned twice by military regimes. In 1977, he was charged with sedition and barred from journalism by the Zia-ul Haq regime.

Fatah left Pakistan and settled in Saudi Arabia, before emigrating to Canada in 1987. He stated that he eventually renounced his Pakistani citizenship due in part to the government's discrimination against Ahmadiyya.

Of himself, Fatah asserted:

I am an Indian born in Pakistan, a Punjabi born in Islam; an immigrant in Canada with a Muslim consciousness, grounded in a Marxist youth. I am one of Salman Rushdie's many Midnight's Children: we were snatched from the cradle of a great civilization and made permanent refugees, sent in search of an oasis that turned out to be a mirage.

== Political activity ==
Fatah was a long-time member of the Ontario New Democratic Party (NDP) and ran unsuccessfully in the 1995 provincial elections as the party's candidate in Scarborough North. He subsequently worked for Ontario NDP leader, Howard Hampton.

In July 2006, he left the NDP to support Bob Rae's candidacy for the Liberal Party of Canada's leadership. Rae, a former Ontario NDP leader and Premier of Ontario, had himself left the NDP several years earlier. In an opinion piece published in Toronto's Now Magazine, Fatah wrote that he decided to leave the NDP because of the establishment of a faith caucus which he believed would open the way for religious fundamentalists to enter the party. However, after Rae's defeat by Stéphane Dion, Fatah condemned similar racial and religious organization activity in the Liberal Party, arguing in a Globe and Mail editorial that Tamil, Sikh, Kurdish and Islamist Muslim leaders had engaged in "blatant efforts to wield political muscle," "bargaining the price of their cadre of delegates" and creating a "political process that feeds on racial and religious exploitation." "I respect the diversity of Canada," he wrote, "but I want to celebrate what unites us, not what divides us into tiny tribes that can be manipulated by leaders who sell us to the highest bidder."

At a press conference on 2 October 2008, Fatah sharply criticized the federal New Democratic Party (NDP). He stated that he was a lifetime social democrat who had supported the NDP for 17 years but that he could no longer be affiliated with that party. He claimed that the NDP began opening its doors to Islamists under Alexa McDonough and that, under Jack Layton, he had seen them flood into the party. Fatah said that Islamists in the NDP have pursued a campaign to instill a sense of victimhood among Muslim youth.

In early 2011, Fatah said that he received a threat via Twitter. He contacted Toronto Police Service and later met with two police officers from 51 Division. Fatah said that police intelligence officers, one a Muslim officer who had shut down a previous investigation into a death threat, shut down the investigation and claimed that there was no threat. Fatah criticized the Toronto Police over the incident.

In a 2015 Toronto Sun column, Fatah wrote that he would be voting for Conservative leader Stephen Harper in the 2015 federal elections, while still calling himself a social democrat.

Fatah favoured both Donald Trump and Bernie Sanders for the United States presidential race in 2016. He said that many Muslim groups, and he himself, have recommended curbs on immigration from countries that harbour Islamist sympathisers, similar to policies promised by Trump.

== Media activity ==
From 1996 until 2006 Fatah hosted Muslim Chronicle, a weekly Toronto-based current affairs discussion show on CTS and VisionTV, which focused on the Muslim community.

In February 2011, he was scheduled to have a debate with Sheharyar Shaikh of the North American Muslim Foundation (NAMF), after Shaikh issued an open challenge to Fatah to debate him. Fatah cancelled at the last minute and failed to show up. Shaikh, who had defended polygamy and opposed secular education for Muslims, was a critic of Fatah's views. Fatah stated that he had cancelled his appearance because the moderator was changed shortly before the event was to begin, and because the audience was hostile. Fatah also claimed that he was warned by police of threats to his safety. Fatah and Shaikh later appeared together in an interview for Sun News debating the role of Islam in ISIS.

From 2009 to 2015, Fatah was a broadcaster on Toronto radio station CFRB Newstalk 1010. As well as appearing as a regular contributor on the John Moore Morning Show, Fatah was a co-host of the nightly Friendly Fire with Ryan Doyle and Tarek Fatah from 2009 to 2011 and from 2011 to 2015 he hosted The Tarek Fatah Show on Sunday afternoons.

From 2012 to 2023, Fatah has written a regular column for the Toronto Sun and was a frequent commentator on the now-defunct Sun News Network.

From 2018 to 2023, Fatah was a regular host of "What The Fatah" which was hosted by New Delhi Times on their YouTube channel. The talk show mainly focused on the current international political trends.

== Views ==
Fatah was a critic of Pakistan. He had questioned the legitimacy of the state and had advocated support for Baloch separatists. He believed that if Balochistan won independence, the remainder of Pakistan would reunify with India. In February 2013, after the website of the Toronto Sun was blocked in Pakistan; Fateh claimed credit. He rejected antisemitism as incompatible with Islam and had supported Israel's right to exist and Zionist projects; he had however called for an end to the "illegal and immoral" Israeli occupation of Palestine and anti-Arabism.

In 2003, Fatah broke with Irshad Manji in an article in the Globe and Mail in which he repudiated the thanks she gave him in the acknowledgment section of her book The Trouble with Islam. Fatah wrote of Manji's book that it is not addressed to Muslims; it is aimed at making Muslim-haters feel secure in their thinking. Manji replied saying that he told her in front of witnesses that "This book was written by the Jews for the Jews!" Fatah was subsequently quoted as indicating that he regrets his remarks and that he was unfair in slamming Manji's book. He said that she was right about the systematic racism in the Muslim world and that there were many redeeming points in her memoir, which he overlooked in his rush to judge it.

Fatah has criticized the partition of India on the basis that it created the state of Pakistan and resulted in "the entire population of Punjab’s indigenous Sikhs and Hindus in Pakistan was either slaughtered or driven out by raging mobs of Muslim fanatics." In a 2012 article he wrote for the Toronto Sun, Fatah argued that Pakistan partially owes its existence to the desire of the British and later American governments to combat the Soviet Union's influence in the region.

Fatah was a critic of Sharia law. In a discussion hosted by The Globe and Mail in 2007, Fatah claimed that "most of the Islamic radicalism that you see today stems from the empowering of Saudi based Jihad groups that were funded and backed by the U.S. and the CIA throughout the Afghan war against the Soviet Union."

In response to the 2017 Quebec City mosque shooting, Fatah endorsed the discredited conspiracy theory that Muslims had participated as perpetrators in the attack that killed six people.

According to the National Post he had also said "Islam is riddled with termites ... and if we don't cleanse ourselves with truth, the stench of our lies will drive us mad", and that there are "hateful sermons in almost every mosque" in Canada – Fatah himself never attended a mosque and encouraged Muslim parents to keep their children out of mosques because they have become, in his view, schools for fanaticism.

In November 2011, 60 Muslim groups and two dozen imams endorsed a statement that called for action against domestic violence, condemned honour killing as a notion that had absolutely nothing to do with Islam. Fatah refused to endorse the statement, according to the National Post, arguing that the statement did not address gender inequality and that honour killing has roots in Islam. According to Fatah, Islam deems the relationship of an unmarried woman as "adultery" and imams must distance themselves from punishing such actions by death.

In April 2008, the Ontario Human Rights Commission (OHRC) dismissed a complaint about allegedly Islamophobic articles in Maclean's magazine. However, the commission criticized the newsweekly for publishing articles that were inconsistent with the spirit of the Ontario Human Rights Code, and doing serious harm to Canadian society by promoting societal intolerance and disseminating destructive, xenophobic opinions. Fatah said that for the Commission to refer to Maclean's magazine and journalists as contributing to racism is bullshit, if you can use that word and that the commission has unfairly taken sides against freedom of speech in a dispute within the Canadian Muslim community between moderates and fundamentalists.

== Reception ==
Michael Coren, a critic of Islam, has praised Fatah for being brave enough to admit the faults and failings of Islam. Wael Haddara, president of the Muslim Association of Canada, said that he respect[s] Fatah for his passion but that it was hard, if not downright impossible, to find something positive that he has ever said about Muslims. As a result, Haddara argues, Muslims are no longer listening to Fatah. Syed Soharwardy, president of the Islamic Supreme Council of Canada, noted Fatah's views to be valuable but rejected his stereotyping of Islam by extrapolating from the behavior of a few extremists. In February 2007, Fatah was included by Maclean's magazine on a list of 50 Canadians described as "Canada's most well known and respected personalities.". In December 2008, the Toronto Star suggested that Prime Minister Stephen Harper appoint Fatah to one of the vacant seats in the Canadian Senate. Toronto Star's senior editor Bob Hepburn wrote that Fatah is "A prominent spokesperson for secular and progressive Muslim issues who would bring a much-needed unique perspective to the Senate."

'Fatah ka Fatwa' was well received by the masses; radical Islamist organisations have protested against the show and urged for his assassination.

Tarek Fatah was criticised for spreading "fake news" on multiple occasions. Amid the Delhi Assembly Election in 2020, he tweeted an old communally-charged video, and claimed it to be from Delhi. In Jan 2020, he tweeted another video of Burqa-clad persons dancing to a Bollywood number, hinting that the video is from Shaheen Bagh CAA-NRC protest, whereas, it was found that Fatah had tweeted the same video twice in the past. Because of his continued pattern of spreading "fake news" on Twitter, especially in "sectarian lines", some critics have argued that he is an external agent who wants to create "communal disturbances" in India. Writing about his targeting of Indian Muslims, AltNews.in accused him of blurring the lines between rational scepticism and contempt toward the Muslim community.

In 2016, after delivering a talk at Panjab University in India, he entered into a verbal altercation with some students. This was after he called a student from Kargil a Pakistani Terrorist and then called a Sikh student a Khalistani. He also told a Hindu girl in the same event, "You are the real patriot because of your religion." He criticised the students for standing up to show respect when the librarian came in. He told them, "Indians need to stop giving such treatment to their seniors".

In 2017, Chicago based Indian Mufti, Yasir Nadeem al Wajidi challenged Fatah for an academic debate anywhere in the world. He expressed that "If Fatah really liked to debate Islam then he should debate with Yasir anywhere in the world, owing to conditions including the presence of independent judges and at a public place not in a TV studio." Yasir started Surgical Strike, a talk show to debunk the ideas and allegations made by Fatah against Islam.

In November 2017, Indian police arrested two men who were hired by Chhota Shakeel to assassinate Fatah.

== Advocacy groups ==
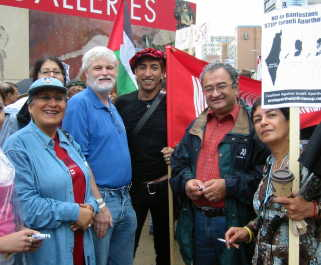
Tarek Fatah and other MCC board members at anti-war demonstration in Toronto

=== Muslim Canadian Congress ===
Fatah was one of the founders of the Muslim Canadian Congress in 2001, after the September 11 attacks and served as its communications director and spokesperson until 2006. He spoke out against the introduction of Sharia law as an option for Muslims in civil law in Ontario, Sharia banking in Canada, which he has described as a 'con-job', promoted social liberalism in the Muslim community and the separation of religion from the state, and endorsed same-sex marriage.

In July 2006, Fatah was the subject of an email campaign at Canadian media over his views. Fatah resigned as the communications director of the MCC in August 2006, citing concerns about his safety and his family member's safety.

=== Canadian Islamic Congress (CIC) ===
==== Mohamed Elmasry ====
In October 2004 CIC President Mohamed Elmasry stated that all Israelis over 18 are legitimate targets for suicide bombers. Fatah, along with other Jewish and Muslim organizations, called on Elmasry to quit.

In June 2006, Elmasry said that Fatah is well known in Canada for smearing Islam and bashing Muslims. Fatah responded that "[t]his is a classic threat to label anyone as an apostate and then marginalize them, and this is what Mr. Elmasry has done by listing me as the top anti-Islam Muslim." Fatah said he saw the label from Elmasry as tantamount to a death sentence. Leonard Librande, professor of religion at Carleton University, told CTV News "There's nothing particularly Islamic in this... There are differences of opinion frequently in the community. It doesn't mean somebody is going to kill you."

==== Wahida Valiante ====
Wahida Valiante, president of the CIC, told The Globe and Mail that Tarek Fatah's views are diametrically opposed to most Muslims. There is a tremendous amount of discussion in the community. His point of view contradicts the fundamentals of Islam. Fatah wrote to the RCMP to complain about the CIC's article claiming that it "is as close as one can gets to issuing a death threat, as it places me as an apostate and blasphemer."

== Books ==
=== Chasing a Mirage ===
The Toronto Star reviewer John Goddard said that book was a "richly layered work of stark realities." Emran Qureshi in the Globe and Mail said that Fatah had provided a "substantial contribution to the critique of the Islamic state and the state of Islam, especially in Canada" but criticized the book for its "gratuitous polemics" and sloppy fact-checking. The book was praised by the Mackenzie Institute, as a direct challenge to the far-Islamist fanatics which deriving from the original texts of Islam, successfully argued about how the pursuit of a global Islamic state violated Mohammed's tenets. On 31 March 2009, the conservative Donner Canadian Foundation shortlisted the book for their $35,000 Donner Prize, awarded to non-fiction texts covering public policy.

=== The Jew Is Not My Enemy ===
Published by McClelland & Stewart in October 2010, it won the 2010 Helen and Stan Vine Canadian Book Award in Politics and History, by the Koffler Centre of the Arts.

== Death and cremation ==
Fatah died of cancer on 24 April 2023, at age 73. His widow, Nargis Tapal Fatah, died later that year, in December 2023. He was cremated in a private ceremony on April 27, 2023. His wish to be cremated was controversial as it was contrary to traditional Islamic funeral rites which strictly forbid cremation. His daughter said that his preference was due to wishing to be ‘like his ancestors’, an apparent reference to traditional Indian practice and his self-identification as an Indian born in Pakistan.

== See also ==
- Tahir Gora
