= Farzana Hassan =

Author, speaker, & human rights activist

Farzana Hassan, also known as Farzana Hassan Shahid, is a Pakistani-Canadian author, speaker, and human rights activist who focuses on the treatment of Muslim women and has expressed support for banning the burqa. She is a columnist for the Toronto Sun and a former President of the Muslim Canadian Congress.

Born in Pakistan, Hassan obtained degrees from Kinnaird College, the University of the Punjab, the University of Massachusetts, and the University of Phoenix.

Books Hassan has authored include Islam, Women and the Challenges of Today: Modernist Insights and Feminist Perspectives (2006); Unveiled: A Canadian Muslim Woman's Struggle Against Misogyny, Sharia and Jihad (2012); and The Case Against Jihad (2018).
