= Muslim Canadian Congress =

Islamic organization based in Canada

- Congrès musulman canadien
- Formation: December 2001
- Location: Canada

The Muslim Canadian Congress (French: Congrès musulman canadien) was organized to provide a voice to Muslims who support a "progressive, liberal, pluralistic, democratic, and secular society where everyone has the freedom of religion."

== Origins ==
It was formed in December 2001, in the wake of 9/11 by a group of Toronto area liberal and secular Muslims led by Tarek Fatah. It is a Muslim organization in Canada that stands for "separation of religion and state in all matters of public policy."

The group gained prominence by opposing the implementation of Shariah law in civil law in Ontario and supporting the country's same-sex marriage legislation. The group also promotes gender equality and was involved in organizing a Muslim prayer session in which the prayers were led by a woman, Raheel Raza. It has also been critical of Islamic fundamentalism and has urged the government to ban donations to Canadian religious institutions from abroad arguing that doing so will curb extremism.

== Split ==
The Congress suffered a serious split in the summer of 2006 when several of its members and leaders left to form the Canadian Muslim Union. According to reports, the split occurred over questions of how the group engages with the broader Muslim community.

The issue came to head over the MCC's position on the arrest of 17 Muslims in the 2006 Toronto terrorism case and objections by some MCC leaders to the MCC's participation in anti-war demonstrations during the 2006 Israel-Lebanon War where flags of Hezbollah and Hamas were raised along with posters of Iranian leader Ahmedinejad and Hezbollah leader Nasrallah.

The entire executive and most of the board members eventually resigned. The CMU was formed the next day. CMU's philosophy of Liberal Islam is similar to the MCC's but with what they claim is their intention to work "within the Muslim community". CMU has been dormant since 2011. The slate of its officers is not available online.

Despite this split, MCC continued its work of promoting secularism, and its members and directors continue to face opposition from those following political Islam. Some of its members have also received serious threats from unknown individuals.

Tarek Fatah was its communications director and spokesperson until he resigned from the board in August 2006 and Farzana Hassan was the MCC's president from August 2006 until April 2010. Munir Pervaiz assumed the position of President in 2015. Farzana Hassan and others continued to be its director with Fatah recognized as the founder of the MCC enjoying the full support of its directors.

== Stances ==
In 2006, the Muslim Canadian Congress supported the campaign of Boycott, Divestment and Sanctions against Israel. The Congress also compared Israeli policies to South African apartheid.

In 2007, the MCC came out against a Canadian Human Rights Commission complaint made by several youths associated with the Canadian Islamic Congress against Maclean's Magazine for publishing an allegedly Islamophobic column by Mark Steyn saying that "The reaction of the CIC has only given credence to his premise - that Muslims in the West cannot accept the values of individual freedom, a free press and the right to offend... How ironic and how unfortunate. For Steyn's thesis could as easily have been disproved by the traditional means of rational debate."

Earlier that year, the MCC came out against a proposal by John Tory and the Ontario Progressive Conservative Party to publicly fund faith-based schools accusing the Tories of "pandering to clerics".

The MCC has also been outspoken on the issue of women wearing the Niqaab saying "It is not a requirement of Islam that Muslim women stay covered completely" and that women should be assured that not wearing the hijab is not a sin. In October 2009, the MCC called for a ban on burka and niqab (though not the hijab), saying that they have "no basis in Islam." Spokesperson Farzana Hassan cited public safety issues, such as identity concealment, as well as gender equality, stating that wearing the burka and niqab is "a practice that marginalizes women."

In April 2008, the MCC criticized the Ontario Human Rights Commission (OHRC) for its stating a claim by the Canadian Islamic Congress that Maclean's magazine was publishing Islamophobic articles. The MCC stated that "the OHRC has become the virtual organ of Canada’s Islamist organizations and that it has taken sides in the bitter struggle within Canada’s Muslim community where sharia-supporting Islamists are pitted against liberal and secular Muslims" and that "the OHRC decision had the finger prints of its pro-Islamist commissioners who have close association with the Canadian Islamic Congress. It is not just the commissioners, but we have reason to believe that there are staff on the OHRC that support sharia law and endorse the CIC’s positions."

It has also joined International Coalition Against Blasphemy Laws.

MCC officers profess serious reformation in Islam. MCC also supports Canada's secular democracy, and continues to be the major Muslim voice against political Islam in Canada.

== See also ==
- Islam in Canada
- Canadian Islamic Congress
