= Censorship in Canada =

In Canada, appeals by the judiciary to community standards and the public interest are the ultimate determinants of which forms of expression may legally be published, broadcast, or otherwise publicly disseminated. Other public organisations with the authority to censor include some tribunals and courts under provincial human rights laws, and the Canadian Radio-television and Telecommunications Commission, along with self-policing associations of private corporations such as the Canadian Association of Broadcasters and the Canadian Broadcast Standards Council.

Over the 20th century, legal standards for censorship in Canada shifted from a "strong state-centred practice", intended to protect the community from perceived social degradation, to a more decentralised form of censorship often instigated by societal groups invoking the state to restrict the public expression of political and ideological opponents.

== Visual arts ==
=== Corridart ===
The demolition of the Corridart exhibit in Montreal by former mayor Jean Drapeau on the 13 June 1976, two days before the commencement of the Montreal Olympic Games, was considered an act of censorship by the artists involved and resulted in a lengthy court trial wherein the artistic and aesthetic merit of the project was questioned. The collaborative efforts of a significant portion of the Montreal arts community was ordered destroyed by the mayor and was done so by municipal workers with police escort. The 16 main installations and dozens of smaller installations were taken to a municipal impound lot, in some cases left outside to be destroyed by the elements. The actions of the mayor were condemned by the provincial cultural affairs minister, principally because the mayor lacked legal authority over the Olympics as a whole. Corridart was intended to showcase Canadian and Montreal arts to an international audience.

=== Mercer Union Art Gallery ===
In 1992, the Supreme Court of Canada ruled that obscene pornography was not protected expression in R v Butler, arguing that while a direct causal link from obscenity to real world harm may be "difficult, if not impossible, to establish" it was reasonable to presume a causal link to "changes in attitudes and beliefs". In 1993, Prime Minister Kim Campbell's Progressive Conservatives made child pornography and its fictional works a crime, adopting Liberal Justice Minister Jean Chretien's proposal from 1982.

In December 1993, the Metropolitan Toronto Police's Morality Bureau raided the Mercer Union Gallery and confiscated fictional works consisting of five paintings and thirty-five drawings from Eli Langer's exhibit. The exhibit had been described by the Mercer Union as "sexual ambiguity that inadvertently addresses our cultural taboos" and some of the art depicted fictional children engaged in sexual acts. Langer was arrested and charged with the crime of making and distributing child pornography. Langer claimed to be surprised by the charges and that he did not know art could be illegal. The director of Mercer Union, Sharon Brooks, was also arrested and charged. All charges on these two individuals were later withdrawn but the artwork remained confiscated for years. The event drew controversy in several news outlets. The Canadian Civil Liberties Association condemned parliament for the fast speed in which the legislation was passed without amending it enough to account for adverse outcomes. Two years later, the artwork was returned to Langer after a judge ruled that his art did not meet the criteria of pornography.

Following the Supreme Court trial R v Sharpe in 2001, Chief Justice Beverley McLachlin maintained that "Parliament was justified in concluding that visual works of the imagination would harm children". In 2002, Prime Minister Jean Chretien's Liberals criminalized online access to child pornography, including fictional art as well. In 2005, Gordon Chin was the first Canadian criminally convicted under this law for importing and possessing explicit cartoons depicting fictional children.

=== Kiss & Tell Collective ===
In the 1980s and 1990s, Canada Customs censored various examples of queer art and literature, preventing it from entering the country. Canada's border officers censored the Vancouver-based lesbian art collective Kiss & Tell on four separate occasions. Despite their work being shown in a number of Canadian galleries, Kiss & Tell’s Drawing the Line photographs—which represented lesbian sexuality—as well as any magazines with articles about the exhibition, were confiscated at the border. In 1991, the U.S. magazine Libido ran an article with photos of the Kiss & Tell exhibition, causing it to be detained at the border. Images were sent to the magazine for layout, and those too, were detained. Similarly, the lesbian magazine Deneuve ran a review of the Drawing the Line exhibition with photos. The Vancouver-based queer bookstore Little Sister’s ordered copies of this magazine, which were denied entry to the country due to the nature of Kiss & Tell's imagery. Lastly, Kiss & Tell created a postcard book based on Drawing the Line, which was published in Canada and distributed by Inland in the U.S. These books were seized on their way to Edmonton. Despite having their work confiscated by Canada Customs, Kiss & Tell refused to stop their creative practice. In her testimony in the case, Kiss & Tell member Persimmon Blackbridge said: “We’ll continue to explore sexual representations…. We will continue to show our art internationally despite the fear of losing our work.”

=== "Will and Representation" ===
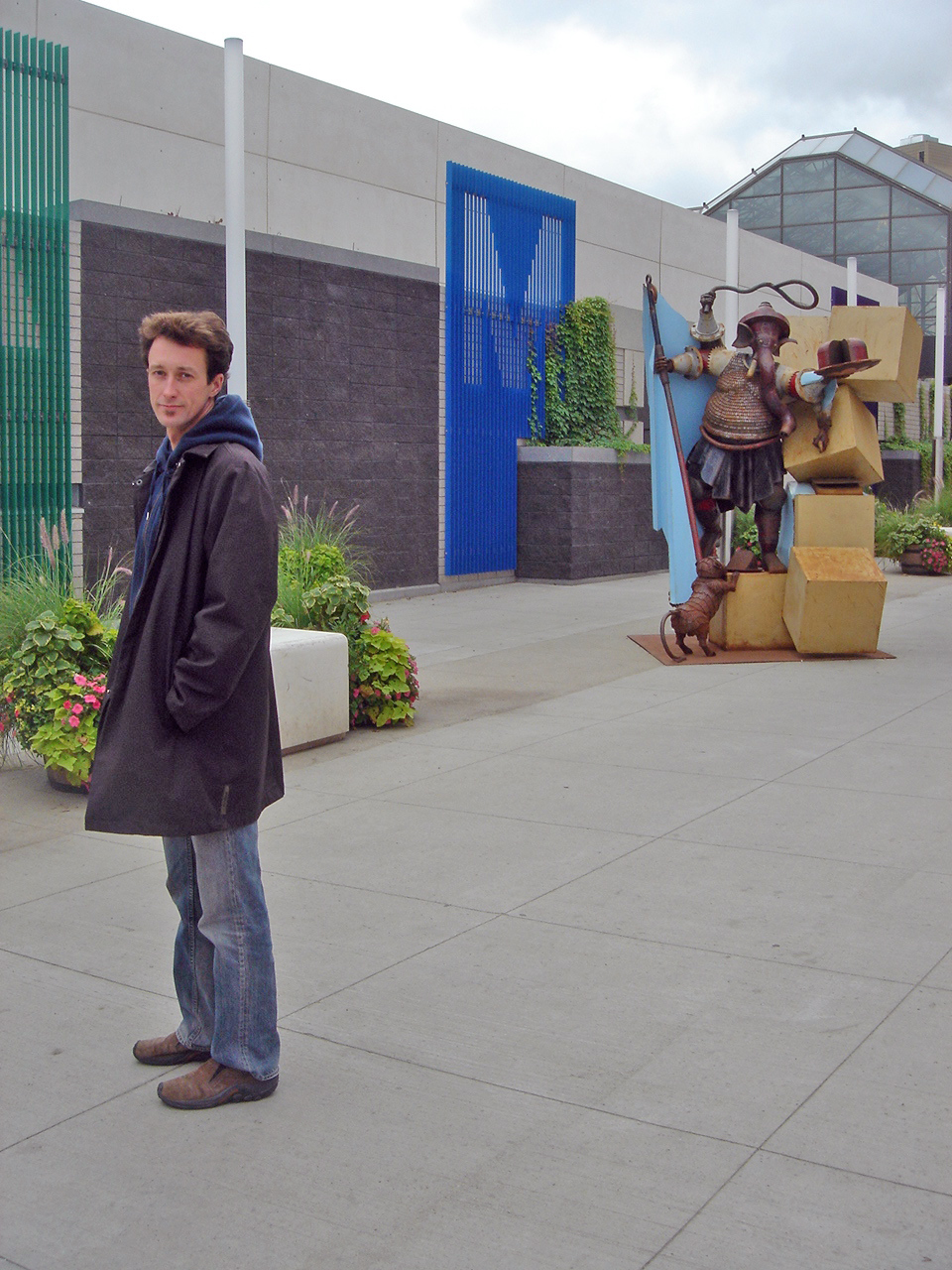
Ryan McCourt, pictured with his sculpture "Destroyer of Obstacles," in front of the Shaw Conference Centre in Edmonton, August 2007, a month before the work was ordered removed by Mayor Stephen Mandel

In 2006, Ryan McCourt was the first artist selected to display sculpture for one year outside Edmonton's Shaw Conference Centre. McCourt's exhibition, Will and Representation, was an installation of four large sculptures based on Ganesha, a deity from Hindu mythology. Ten months into the exhibition, then-Mayor of Edmonton Stephen Mandel ordered the works removed after reportedly receiving a 700-name petition complaining of the sculptures' "disrespectful" nudity. When asked for comment, McCourt stated that "Nudity seems like a rather quaint thing to get one's knickers in a bunch over, in the 21st century. Besides, there's lots of art that I don't like, I don't go around gathering signatures of people who agree with me, and try to force the art to come down. That would be truly offensive, especially in a democracy like Canada."

Broadly, the public reaction to Mandel's censorship decree was one of disapproval. In an interview with the Edmonton Journal's Paula Simons, David Goa, religious scholar, cultural anthropologist, and director of the University of Alberta's Ronning Centre for Study of Religion and Public Life, states "In India, Lord Ganesha is on everything — playing cards, advertising signs, lotto tickets, even diapers, I suspect." Within the traditional Thirty-two forms of Ganesha in Hinduism, Ganesha is sometimes presented nude, in both infant (Bala Ganapati) and erotic (Uchchhishta Ganapati) forms. Simons concludes, "In his haste to appease a few protesters, the mayor, usually a champion of the arts, made a serious error in judgment. Instead of giving McCourt's divinely inspired statues the bum's rush, we should be celebrating this Canadian cross-pollination of cultures and aesthetic forms". The Globe and Mail's columnist Margaret Wente agreed with Simons: "The mayor, of course, was quite wrong. Mr. McCourt's sculptures did not insult the Hindu community. They insulted a small but vocal conservative religious group that is about as representative of Hindus as Hassidic Jews are of Jews.... There's a big difference between respecting different cultures and caving in to illiberalism and superstition."

Despite such negative responses in the media to visual art censorship in Canada, in 2014 the Edmonton Arts Council subsequently refused a donation of one of McCourt's sculptures, Destroyer of Obstacles, evidently because the sculpture had genitalia "beneath its clothes". After meeting with seven Hindu community group representative to seek out their opinion of the donation, the Edmonton Arts Council received a response that McCourt's sculpture was "an offense to their religion" and that the ban enacted by Mayor Mandel should remain in place. As a result of this consultation, "the Public Art Committee unanimously voted to decline acceptance of the gift, as the artwork did not meet "community or civic suitability" criteria." In McCourt's view, "It is not the purpose of a city's public art collection to placate special interests," he says. "I want Edmonton to build the best civic art collection that we can get, never mind the politics, the religion, etc. of the artists making the work."

== Print ==
Under the War Measures Act, the Canadian government imposed strict censorship of news related to World War I. 250 publications and periodicals, including many from the United States, were banned in the country. The censorship was expanded in 1918 in response to the Bolshevik success in the Russian Revolution and fears that Communism would spread to the rest of the world.

In 1937, under Maurice Duplessis, Quebec's Union Nationale government passed the Act to protect the Province Against Communistic Propaganda (commonly known as the "Padlock Law"), which banned the printing, publishing or distributing of "any newspaper, periodical, pamphlet, circular, document or writing, propagating Communism or Bolshevism". The law was struck down by the Supreme Court of Canada as an attempt to legislate criminal law ultra vires of the provincial legislature in the 1957 Switzman v Elbling decision.

In 1949, spearheaded by the campaigning of MP Davie Fulton, crime comics were banned in Canada in Bill 10 of the 21st Canadian Parliament's 1st session (informally known as the Fulton Bill).

The silence of Canadian officials, their refusal to answer questions...reveals the attitude of Canadian officials on books...if they will ban my book without a hearing, if they will uphold officials who will ban Balzac, Trotsky, Joyce, Lawrence and others, they will be likely to ban still further books.

— James T. Farrell, whose 1946 book Bernard Clare was banned

In 1955, the importation of American The Atom Spy Hoax was deemed seditious as it questioned the Canadian government's handling of the Igor Gouzenko affair.

=== Little Sisters Book and Art Emporium v Canada ===
One of the most famous ongoing censorship controversies in Canada has been the dispute between Canada Customs and LGBT retail bookstores such as Little Sister's in Vancouver and Glad Day in Toronto. Through the 1980s and into the 1990s, Canada Customs frequently stopped material being shipped to the two stores on the grounds of "obscenity". Kiss & Tell, mentioned above, was involved in this case, as their work was detained while en route to Little Sister's. Both stores frequently had to resort to the legal system to challenge the confiscation of their property.

In 2000, the Supreme Court of Canada ruled that Canada Customs did not have the authority to make its own judgments about the permissibility of material being shipped to the stores but was permitted to confiscate only material that had specifically been ruled by the courts to constitute an offence under the Criminal Code.

In addition a report from 2013, reports that over 100 books, magazine, and other written works were challenged for removal in schools and libraries. Some of these challenges were upheld; however, some were rejected.

=== Hansel et Gretel ===
Prime Minister Paul Martin's 38th Canadian Parliament expanded child pornography law to also include literary descriptions in 2005.

Quebec author Yvan Godbout was arrested and charged with making and distributing child pornography due to his horror novel Hansel et Gretel featuring writing of fictional child sexual abuse. Godbout was acquitted and found not guilty in 2020. Godbout felt compelled to stop writing altogether and ended his career in 2023 citing his prosecution as the cause.

== Film ==
In the early 1910s, motion pictures were rising in popularity. It was decided nationally that censorship of them was necessary in order to be suitable for a wide, general audience of varying ages, mental, and educational levels. However, since national censorship for such a large and diverse country was unworkable, each province would censor according to their own provincial community standards. However, Ontario would be the "main" censor in that theatrical prints would be censored/edited by the Ontario censors then distributed throughout Ontario and the other provinces. The other provinces would provide additional censorship/editing if it was necessary for their own province. The Ontario board was formed in 1911; other provinces followed shortly thereafter. Prince Edward Island and Newfoundland never formed any boards but instead took their advice from the New Brunswick and Nova Scotia boards.

The censors had no strict rules however; they often took advice from the British Board of Film Censors in the early years. In the 1920s, the Ontario censor board objected to content such as:

- actors pointing guns directly at the camera, or at other actors due to the possible negative effects on children and mentally weaker individuals
- machine guns
- scenes with women smoking
- profanity, vulgarity, and obscenity
- disrespect for officers of the law
- depiction and patriotic waving of the American flag, this was so the boards could promote a sense of Canadian nationalism
- illicit sexual relations
- nudity
- cruelty to animals
- drinking
- drug use

In the 1920s, the Canadian film boards removed American patriotism from imported films, citing their damage to a pro-British sentiment. The Hicklin test was used as the standard for film censorship until 1959, when the Criminal Code was amended and the Supreme Court of Canada overruled a ruling by the Nova Scotia Court of Appeal that held that the Hicklin test was still in effect.

Eventually, six of the provincial censor boards adopted classification in 1953 though films were still censored for certain categories. The idea of classification was first proposed by Ottawa child welfare advocate, and future mayor, Charlotte Whitton in 1920; however, at the time it was criticized with one newspaper editor claiming "A film that's not suitable for a ten-year-old should not be seen at all." It was in the 1950s that the censorship standards became more permissive. For example, A Farewell to Arms contained an intense birth scene, a character yells "Damn!" in Witness for the Prosecution, and Peyton Place contained "pungent language". All of which was passed, in Ontario at least.

Last Tango in Paris was banned in Nova Scotia in 1974. Gerard McNeil, the editor of the Dartmouth Free Press, opposed the film's censorship and he filed a lawsuit in which he argued that the censors were acting illegally when they banned the film, citizens have a right to view uncensored films regardless of its content, and that the taxes and fees collected by the Amusements Board was to continue its illegal activities. The censors argued that McNeil had no standing to sue as he had no direct interest in the case, but the Nova Scotia Supreme Court stated that "there could be a large number of persons with a valid desire to challenge". The court ruled on 2 February 1976, that the provinces had no power to censor films under the British North America Acts. However, the Supreme Court of Canada overruled the court on 19 January 1978, in a five to four decision.

The romantic comedy Young People Fucking prompted the Government of Canada to introduce Bill Income Tax Amendments Act, 2006 (C-10), to allow revoking government funds from films the government deemed offensive. Strong public backlash led to the bill dying on the order paper.

=== Alberta ===
The Theatres Act was passed in Alberta in 1913, and it required that all films have a stamp from the provincial censorship board. R.B. Chadwick served as the censor from 1913 to 1916, when Howard Douglas, who served until 1928, was appointed following Chadwick's death. Robert Pearson, who served from 1928 to 1946, censored films "practically on individual whim" and banned 150 films in the first six years of sound movies. P.J.A. Fleming, who served from 1946 to 1964, banned almost 100 films and made over 4,000 alterations to films.

In the 1930s the Catholic Church wanted all scenes depicting divorce censored while the National Council of Women of Canada wanted of all scenes including alcohol censored.

Ernest Manning believed that the film industry in the United States was dominated by communists and sought to ban multiple films including Frank Sinatra's The House I Live In. Cornelia Wood, stated that Tom Jones, which was banned in Alberta, should be destroyed. Alberta was the only place to ban A Clockwork Orange in North America, but the ban was lifted in 1973, when the film was rated as "Restricted Adult".

Alberta had one of the earliest rating systems in the 1920s. The U rating allowed for "unaccompanied children under fourteen years of age permitted" while the Adult rating required adult accompaniment. Comedies and newsreels were excluded from the ratings system. The Adult Only rating was created in 1964.

=== British Columbia ===
The Act to Regulate Theatres, by William John Bowser, was passed in 1913, and C.L. Gordon was selected as the first censor. Censorship powers were increased by the Theatres Act in 1914, which allowed films to be seized, theatres required licenses, and Sunday showings were banned. The Spoilers was banned, but Bowser overturned the ruling making it the first time a decision by a censorship board was successfully overturn. J. Bernard Hughes, the chief censor in British Columbia, banned Diary of a Nazi stating that it was "purely Russian propaganda" that depicted "the Nazis at their worst". The censorship board was transitioned into a classification board in 1970. Audiences in Vancouver circumvented film censorship by attending showings in the U.S. state of Washington. Mary-Louise McCausland appointment as censor in 1978 made her the first woman to hold the position. She was known for her liberal attitudes during her tenure such as when she allowed Pretty Baby, which was banned in Ontario, to be shown in British Columbia.

=== Manitoba ===
Manitoba's censorship board was initially based in Winnipeg and it was shared with Saskatchewan. The board was divided into two in 1916, but Saskatchewan still used Winnipeg. Alberta's rating system was adopted in Manitoba in 1930, with the Universal and Adult ratings.

Six minutes from The Stewardesses were removed in 1971, but Attorney General Al Mackling ordered for the film to be seized, threatened to increase censorship laws, and filed charges against the Metropolitan Theatre for obscenity. The New Democratic Party of Manitoba abolished the censor board in 1972, and replaced it with the Film Classification Board. The new board was not able to censor films and would only be allowed to classify them. Last Tango in Paris was seized by police in Winnipeg in 1973, but a three to two court ruling decided that the film was not obscene. The Progressive Conservative Party of Manitoba fired all fifteen members of the board after gaining power in 1978. Hope Carroll, whose husband served in Dufferin Roblin's government, was selected as the new chair and was described as "an active Conservative worker".

=== Ontario ===
The Theatres and Cinematographs Act was passed on 24 March 1911. A provision in the legislation which prohibited police officers from preventing the showing of approved films was repealed in 1914. Ontario banned all war films in 1914. In 1919, legislation was passed that allowed censors to ban any film that glorified other nations and the British national anthem was required to be played at the end of all performances. Ontario film censors were brought in by American companies to advise them on films with A.S. Hamilton, the chair of the censorship board from 1920 to 1926, being asked by Universal Pictures to review Foolish Wives.

Damaged Goods, a film about sexually transmitted infection, was banned in Ontario in 1916. Mutual Film screened the film to a selected audience, as a private showing it was exempt from the provincial censorship laws, and asked them if the film should be released. The audience approved of the film and Mutual Film appealed the ruling, but were unsuccessful. To combat the spread of sexual diseases a government campaign was initiated in the late 1910s. The Canadian National Council for Combating Venereal Disease, which was led by William Renwick Riddell and Gordon Bates, sought to distribute The End of the Road in Ontario in 1919. The censorship board was conflicted over maintaining its earlier ruling or allowing a government campaign to continue. The board rejected the film and the ruling was maintained on appeal. However, the ruling was reversed in 1920, and over 20,000 people saw the film within five days of its release and 40,000 by 1932. Other films about sexual diseases were allowed to be shown as well.

Omri J. Silverthorne served as the chair of the censorship board from 1934 to 1974, with him gaining the position after his friend, Mitchell Hepburn, became Ontario's premier. Hepburn, after becoming the minister of finance, banned all of The March of Time newsreels in 1942, without the board watching it, due to a Time article about him that he did not like. Previous censors required all films to be suitable for children while Silverthorne judged films individually causing the Ontario censorship board to be considered the most liberal in the country. The amount of films rejected declined from twenty-four in 1933, to zero in 1940.

Silverthorne stated in 1967, that "Canada is the most over-censored country in the world". In 1971, he stated that he wanted "to see censorship as it is presently being practised abolished in Canada within the next two years". A grand jury investigation into the Ontario censorship board in 1972 criticized its "concern for cultivating a reputation for liberality". Donald Sims replaced Silverthorne in 1974, and increased censorship activates. The Stratford Film Festival was ordered to censor its films for the first time in its history and Pretty Baby was banned. The rejection of The Tin Drum resulted in mass protests that called for the abolition of the censorship board. The Writers' Union of Canada and Festival of Festivals called the board to be converted into one for classification. Sims left the board during the protests in 1980.

=== Quebec ===
A censorship board was established in Quebec in 1911. The deaths of seventy-eight children from the Laurier Palace Theatre fire in 1927, and opposition to film from the Catholic Church led to a ban on minors attending movie theatres. J.A. Cooper, the president of the Motion Picture Distributors and Exhibitors of Canada, stated that Quebec censors were "the worst in the world" in 1926. Maclean's reported that the amount of films banned in Canada fell from one hundred one in 1932, to nineteen in 1940, with nine being banned in Quebec. Quebec censors rejected all films that dealt with divorce. By the 1960s the Quebec censorship board was one of the largest with eighteen full-time staff employed compared to other provincial boards which had two to five full-time staff.

When the Montreal International Film Festival was established in 1960, the Quebec censorship board agreed not to interfere with one-time showings of the films at the festival. Over 40,000 people attended the event. Protests subsequently arose after censored versions of the films were released to theatres.

In 1961, a 125-page report on the censorship board reported that one-third of all films in Quebec had been censored. André Guerin, the chief censor, stated about Quebec censorship that "Along with Spain, the censorship was the tightest in the world". Under Guerin's leadership from the 1960s to the 1980s film censorship lessened with only seven of the eight hundred submitted films in 1965 being rejected. Censorship campaigns by Catholics against Heads or Tails and Apres-Ski, due to their pornographic nature, resulted in them becoming financially successful.

=== Saskatchewan ===
The censorship board in Saskatchewan is believed to have been established in response to the riots over The Johnson–Jeffries Fight. Legislation was passed on 3 November 1911, to authorise the government to appoint a censorship board. Sunday film showings were banned in 1912. William Mackay Omand was appointed as the province's first censor 16 January 1913. The Manitoban and Saskatchewan censorship boards were one group in Winnipeg from 1914 to 1916.

Chief censor D.E. Williams stated that Tom Jones was a "sordid picture in colour, supposedly of life in England in the seventeenth century". Williams made a statement asking the public if that wanted to see a film using objectionable words, in reference to Tom Jones without naming it, and received 213 letters against and 24 in favor. He demanded for twenty scenes to be removed from the film, but the distributor was instructed to not edit the film. The film was allowed to be viewed by adults only after protests.

=== Other provinces and territories ===
Prince Edward Island never had legislation for film censorship and instead used the censorship boards of New Brunswick and Nova Scotia. The Motion Picture (Censorship) Act was passed in Newfoundland in 1916, and the province appointed its censors on 19 September. The Northwest Territories established a classification office on 21 March 1938. The Yukon uses British Columbia's classification system. In 1961, George Enos, who served as New Brunswick's censor from 1929 to 1964, stated that censorship "is very undesirable" and that "Ninety percent of the worry is needless. Respectable people will condemn a bad picture. I don't like the idea of setting up one man to say what his neighbour shall see or not see. He would have to be a superman."

== Broadcasting ==
The main body monitoring and regulating broadcast content in Canada is the Canadian Broadcast Standards Council, a self-governing association of radio and television broadcasters. The Canadian Radio-television and Telecommunications Commission (CRTC), while also having the power to regulate broadcast content, intervenes only in the most serious and controversial cases.

Many Canadian broadcast stations broadcast explicit programming under certain circumstances, albeit with viewer discretion advisories and at adult-oriented times on the schedule. CTV, for example, has aired controversial series such as The Sopranos, Nip/Tuck and The Osbournes in prime time without editing, and some Canadian television broadcasters, such as Citytv & CFVO-TV, in the 1970s, aired softcore pornography after 12 midnight EST, which can therefore be viewed as early as 9:00 p.m. in other parts of Canada (i.e., anywhere in the Pacific Time Zone).

The Code of Ethics of the Canadian Association of Broadcasters defines the "late viewing period" as the hours from 9:00 p.m. to 6:00 a.m. Outside this period, the Code of Ethics prohibits programming containing sexually explicit material or coarse or offensive language. This association also publishes a "Voluntary Code Regarding Violence in Television Programming".

In enforcing these two Codes, the Canadian Broadcast Standards Council permits nudity to be broadcast during the day as long as it is considered non-sexual. For example, the CBSC permitted a 4:00 p.m. broadcast of the movie Wildcats containing male frontal nudity in a locker-room scene and female nudity in a bathtub. The CBSC has also permitted the film Striptease, which contains scenes of bare female breasts, to be shown at 8:00 p.m.

The CBSC summarizes its policy on sexual activity as follows:

Before the Watershed (9:00 pm - 6:00 am), the CBSC considers that it is inappropriate to show sexual activity that is intended for adult eyes and minds. There is, in the pre-Watershed period, a run of 15 hours (a strong majority of the broadcast day and about 90% of our customary waking hours), during which broadcasters offer their audiences a "safe haven", namely, a period in which their television viewing can be free of adult-oriented material, whether sexual or otherwise. There may still, in that time frame, be programming that some parents will not wish their families to see (all adults should make the effort to weigh the appropriateness of all kinds of programming for themselves and their children) but it will not be due to its exclusively adult orientation. And even in the pre-Watershed period, broadcasters advise their audiences of the nature of what is to come.

In 2026, CKUA, Alberta's donor-supported public broadcaster, banned music by Edmonton artist Ryan McCourt from its airwaves after determining it had been created using generative AI tools. The albums The Objectivity of Taste and After Your Death, released under the name The Synthesist, had previously received airplay and public praise from CKUA host Leo Cripps. CKUA's content director confirmed the ban while acknowledging that no written policy or rationale had been made public at the time.

== Internet ==
Until 2021, there were no specific plans to actively regulate internet content in Canada, however local laws applied to websites hosted in Canada as well as to residents who host sites on servers in other jurisdictions. A well-known example is the case of Ernst Zündel, who was investigated by the Canadian Human Rights Commission for promoting ethnic hatred via his website.

In July 2005, in the middle of a labour dispute with the group, Telus briefly blocked a website being run by members of the Telecommunications Workers Union. It cited concerns over the publication of photos of employees who had crossed picket lines, and its advocating for readers to jam the company's phone lines. The site was unblocked after an injunction was obtained to prohibit it from publishing the personal information of Telus employees.

In November 2006, Canadian Internet service providers Bell, Bell Aliant, MTS Allstream, Rogers, Shaw, SaskTel, Telus, and Vidéotron announced Project Cleanfeed Canada, a voluntary effort to block websites hosting child pornography and fictional child pornography. The list of blocked sites is compiled from reports by Internet users and investigated by the independent organization Cybertip.ca. Project Cleanfeed was praised following its founding by Royal Canadian Mounted Police Supt. Earla-Kim McColl (then-head of the National Child Exploitation Coordination Centre).

In October 2011, the Supreme Court of Canada unanimously ruled that online publications cannot be found liable for linking to defamatory material as long as the linking itself is not defamatory.

In 2013, Mark Marek who owned Canadian shock site BestGore was charged with obscenity for hosting footage of the murder of Jun Lin on the website. Marek was criminally convicted for obscenity in 2016.

Following the implementation of Donald Trump's tariffs on Canada in 2025, several Canadian journalists called for government censorship of certain American social media platforms including X. Adam Owen of the Toronto Star stated that tolerating X "risks foreign interference and fosters divisive ideology".

=== Online gambling ===
In 2015, the province of Quebec proposed legislation which would require unlicensed online gambling websites, as defined by Loto-Québec, to be blocked by Internet service providers in defense of the Loto-Québec-operated Espacejeux. The proposal was criticized for the possible precedents that such legislation could set, as it would be the first internet censorship law passed by a Canadian government, as well as the law's intent to maintain a monopoly. Bill 74 was passed by the provincial government in May 2016. It was challenged in the Quebec Superior Court by the Canadian Wireless Telecommunications Association, and by the Public Interest Advocacy Centre in a complaint to the Canadian Radio-television and Telecommunications Commission (CRTC). In December 2016, the Commission decided that it would await the outcome of the court case before making a final ruling, but iterated its opinion that under the Telecommunications Act, no ISP may censor websites without its consent, and that "compliance with other legal or juridical requirements – whether municipal, provincial, or foreign – does not in and of itself justify the blocking of specific websites by Canadian carriers, in the absence of commission approval". In July 2018, the law was struck down by the Quebec Superior Court, citing these matters as being responsibility of the federal government, and the notion of net neutrality upheld by the CRTC.

=== Copyright infringement ===
On January 28, 2018, FairPlay Canada, an industry coalition formed by major Canadian telecom and media conglomerates, proposed to the CRTC the formation of a mandatory system to block websites "blatantly" involved in copyright infringement. The system would utilize an independent organization to submit blocklists to the CRTC for approval; there would be no judicial oversight, and the Federal Court of Appeal could only intervene after the fact. The group argued that illegal streaming of copyrighted media was harming the businesses of themselves and content producers, and that streaming boxes had eased such access. The proposal has been widely criticized for the possibility of abuse; Michael Geist described the proposal as being "ill-advised and dangerous", citing criticisms surrounding other site-blocking systems, the lack of judicial oversight, concerns that accidental overblocking could violate the Charter of Rights and Freedoms, and statistics showing that Canada was below global averages for unauthorized music distribution, and had more Netflix subscribers per-capita than countries with site blocking rules in effect. The proposal was struck down by the CRTC, as copyright law is outside of its jurisdiction.

On November 18, 2019, in the first ruling of its kind, the Federal Court of Canada approved an interlocutory injunction requiring major Canadian ISPs to block a pirate IPTV service. The court ruled that this did not violate net neutrality or freedom of expression.

=== Online Streaming Act ===
In 2022, the Online Streaming Act (Bill C-11) was passed by the House of Commons, which, among other changes, gives the CRTC power to regulate digital media platforms as "broadcasters" under the Broadcasting Act as it does with licensed television and radio broadcasters, including the possibility of imposing regulatory obligations such as Canadian content rules. Professor Michael Geist expressed concerns with the legislation on how it would affect user-generated content visibility on social networks (the bill being meant to target subscription-based video services such as Netflix, but broad enough to extraterritorially cover any audiovisual content served to Canadians online, including sites such as YouTube), the way in which interpretations of "Canadian content" could be broad, and what he perceived as the bill being rushed through the House of Commons too quickly.

CRTC chair Ian Scott would later acknowledge that the legislation would allow for user-generated content to be regulated but that the CRTC would not seek to do so. Liberal Heritage Minister Pablo Rodriguez subsequently replaced Scott with Vicky Eatrides, to be the new chair of the CRTC. After the bill had passed through the Senate, Heritage Minister Rodrigeuz and the Liberal government removed a key amendment that was protecting against the regulation of user-generated content.

=== Online News Act ===
The Online News Act (Bill C-18) passed through parliament in June 2023, resulting in social media platforms including Google and Meta blocking Canadian news.

Reporters Without Borders listed Meta's response to the Online News Act among the causes for dropping Canada's place by seven spots on the World Press Freedom Index from 2024 to 2025. The 2025 ranking represented an all-time low on the index for Canada.

=== Bill S-209 ===
In December 2022, the Senate passed Bill S-210, introduced by Senator Julie Miville-Dechêne, a bill which proposes that companies be liable for making "sexually explicit" material available to internet users under the age of 18 unless they employ an age verification system. The bill gained support from a majority of the House of Commons of Canada including the Conservative Party, Bloc Québécois, New Democratic Party, Green Party, and 15 Liberal Party Members of Parliament. The bill was reintroduced a third time by Miville-Dechêne as Bill S-209.

=== Digital Safety Commissioner ===
In March 2019, following the Christchurch mosque shooting, Minister of Public Safety and Emergency Preparedness Ralph Goodale stated that the government was planning to carefully evaluate whether social media platforms should be required to censor hate speech and extremist content. In 2021, Justice Minister David Lametti introduced Bill C-36 to take down online hate speech and fine those who espouse it for up to $50,000, stating that the "online world" has become the new public square and "that public square should be a safe space".

After Bill C-36 did not pass due to the dissolution of Parliament and the 2021 Canadian federal election, a new version was drafted in 2022 where a Digital Safety Commissioner would oversee and remove internet content considered harmful. The federal government gathered an advisory group, who suggested they remove online content that was "misleading political communications", "propaganda", or content that promoted "unrealistic body image". The plan was eventually postponed following these proposals. The bill was formally introduced by Justice Minister Arif Virani as Bill C-63 on to establish a Digital Safety Commission.

After Bill C-63 did not pass following the dissolution of Parliament and the 2025 Canadian federal election, a new version was introduced as Bill C-34 by Minister of Canadian Identity and Culture Marc Miller. It proposed to reintroduce the Digital Safety Commission and additionally ban minors under the age of 16 from social media platforms.

== Human rights laws ==
The Canadian Human Rights Act formerly prohibited hate messages in telecommunications under federal jurisdiction, such as broadcasting and the Internet. Section 13 of the Act prohibited making a statement by telecommunication which "is likely to expose a person or persons to 'hatred or contempt' by reason of the fact that that person or those persons are identifiable on the basis of a prohibited ground of discrimination." Those prohibited grounds of discrimination are on the basis of race, national or ethnic origin, colour, religion, age, sex, sexual orientation, marital status, family status, disability or conviction for an offence for which a pardon has been granted. Provinces such as British Columbia and Alberta have extended this prohibition to all publications. In 1990, the Supreme Court of Canada upheld the constitutionality of s. 13 of the Canadian Human Rights Act.

In the mid-2000s, there was a series of high-profile cases involving s. 13, and the related provincial provisions. For example, Marc Lemire and Paul Fromm challenged the constitutionality of s. 13. In September 2009 the Canadian Human Rights Tribunal ruled that s. 13 violated Canadians' charter rights to freedom of expression. However, that ruling was overturned on appeal by the Federal Court of Appeal, which found that s. 13 continued to be constitutionally valid.

In 2008, the Alberta Human Rights Commission held hearings on a complaint against former publisher Ezra Levant after the Western Standard published the Jyllands-Posten Muhammad cartoons depicting Muhammad. The complaint was ultimately withdrawn, and a complaint filed with Calgary police came to naught. An identical complaint by the Edmonton Muslim Council was dismissed by the Alberta Commission in August 2008.

In 2008, three complaints were filed in three different jurisdictions against Mark Steyn and Maclean's magazine for publishing excerpts from Steyn's book, America Alone, which the complainants said were offensive to Muslims. All three complaints were dismissed: the Ontario Human Rights Commission declared it lacked jurisdiction; the British Columbia Human Rights Tribunal dismissed the complaint; and the Canadian Human Rights Commission dismissed the complaint without referring the matter to the Canadian Human Rights Tribunal.

The Steyn / Maclean's case has been cited as a motivating factor in the June 2013 repeal of s. 13 of the Canadian Human Rights Act. In 2011, Keith Martin, a Liberal Member of Parliament from British Columbia, introduced a motion that called for the repeal of s. 13, arguing that it violated freedom of expression, guaranteed by s. 2 of the Canadian Charter of Rights and Freedoms. Martin said that hate crimes, slander and libel would still be outlawed under the Criminal Code, while his motion would stop the federal human rights tribunal from imposing restrictions on freedom of speech using taxpayers' money. "We have laws against hate crimes, but nobody has a right not to be offended," he said. "[This provision] is being used in a way that the authors of the Act never envisioned." Following the 2011 election, Brian Storseth, a Conservative Member of Parliament from Alberta, introduced a private member's bill to amend the Canadian Human Rights Act, including the repeal of s. 13. The bill passed both Houses of Parliament and received royal assent on June 26, 2013. It came into force a year later, June 26, 2014.

In 2016, the Human Rights Tribunal of Quebec ordered comedian Mike Ward to pay $42,000 to the family of Jérémy Gabriel, a disabled public figure whose physical appearance Ward had mocked. Ward's lawyer, Julius Grey, began the appeal process shortly after the ruling. In 2021, the ruling was overturned by the Supreme Court of Canada.

== Denying and downplaying genocide ==
In Canada, publicly "denying" or "downplaying" certain genocides is a criminal offense.

=== The Holocaust ===
Following Canadian Confederation, a relic of English common law which banned the spread of false news remained in the 1980s. Ernst Zündel, a German neo-Nazi and Holocaust denier, was convicted of spreading false news when he denied the Holocaust in his pamphlet Did Six Million Really Die? He appealed to the Supreme Court of Canada and was acquitted. The law he was convicted on was found to be unconstitutional, with the conclusion "those who deliberately publish falsehoods are not, for that reason alone, precluded from claiming the benefit of the constitutional guarantees of free speech".

In 2022, Conservative MP Kevin Waugh introduced a bill to criminalize Holocaust denial. The federal Liberal government also proposed criminalizing Holocaust denial. The legislation passed, making the act of publicly "denying" or "downplaying" the Holocaust a crime subject to imprisonment not exceeding two years.

=== Residential school system ===
In 2023, New Democratic Party MP Leah Gazan put forward a bill to criminalize denying or downplaying the alleged genocide that occurred in the Canadian Indian residential school system. Liberal Justice Minister David Lametti stated that he was seeking "a legal solution and outlawing it" while looking to other countries bans on Holocaust denial. In 2025, MP Gazan reintroduced the bill.

In 2026, Senator Nancy Karetak-Lindell introduced an amendment to the Combatting Hate Act (Bill C-9) which would criminalize denying or downplaying and successfully passed the Standing Senate Committee on Human Rights. However, other Senators voted the clause down.

== Quebec secularism ==
In the province of Quebec, secularism laws have led to government censorship of religious expression. The provincial government invoked Section 33 of the Canadian Charter of Rights and Freedoms to implement such laws.

=== Religious garb ===
In 2013, the Parti Québécois under Premier Pauline Marois proposed the Quebec Charter of Values (Bill 60) to ban public display of "ostentatious" religious symbols, however it did not pass.

In 2017, the Quebec Liberal Party under Premier Philippe Couillard passed Bill 62 which banned face coverings for workers in the public service.

In 2019, the Coalition Avenir Québec party under Premier François Legault passed Bill 21 which bans workers in public service from wearing religious symbols. Section 33 of the Canadian Charter of Rights and Freedoms was invoked to enforce it.

In 2021, a school teacher, Fatemeh Anvari, was forced to leave her classroom for wearing a hijab under Bill 21.

=== Public prayer ===
In 2025, Coalition Avenir Québec Secularism Minister Jean-François Roberge proposed a bill to ban prayer in public streets.

== Private and public sectors ==
=== Employers and employees ===
Canadians can be disciplined by their employers for writing letters to newspapers. Christine St-Pierre, a television reporter covering federal politics for Canadian Broadcasting Corporation, was suspended in September 2006 for writing a letter in support of Canadian Armed Forces troops in the War in Afghanistan.

Chris Kempling, a Canadian educator and counsellor, was suspended by the British Columbia College of Teachers and disciplined by the Quesnel School District for anti-gay comments in letters to the editor of the Quesnel Cariboo Observer.

Canadian courts have upheld professional sanctions against teachers and school counsellors for writing letters to newspapers that are found to be discriminatory, limiting their freedom of expression and religion on the basis of maintaining "a school system that is free from bias, prejudice and intolerance."

=== Public servants ===
Canadian public sector employees may be dismissed for criticizing the government, if the criticism reaches the point of impairing the public employee's ability to perform their functions. The requirement of the non-partisan federal public service is an important factor to take into account. For example, in Fraser v. Public Sector Staff Relations Board, the Supreme Court of Canada stated:

When one examines the substance of the criticisms (two major government policies and the character and integrity of the Prime Minister and Government), the context of those criticisms (prolonged, virtually full time, in public meetings, on radio, on television, in newspapers, local, national, international), and the form of the criticisms (initially restrained, but increasingly vitriolic and vituperative) the Adjudicator's conclusion that Mr. Fraser's ability to perform his own job and his suitability to remain in the public service were both impaired was a fair conclusion. Though no direct evidence of the fact of impairment of capacity is required, here the evidence clearly established circumstances from which the inference of impairment is clearly irresistible. Put simply, although there is not an absolute prohibition against public servants criticizing government policies, Mr. Fraser in this case went much too far.

Employees who are disciplined have the right to have the discipline reviewed through workplace arbitration, which in fact was offered to Fraser, but he declined:

There was a disagreement there. The employee wanted to speak out. The employer said that he could not. The employee persisted. The employer suspended him. But that is not all the employer did. The employer recognized that the employee was taking a principled stand. Accordingly, the employer offered to expedite the grievance procedure, provided the employee would cease his criticism. The employee refused. He decided to continue, and in fact greatly expanded, his criticism of the Government. In doing this, it seems to me, he voluntarily assumed the risk that his conduct might be adjudged to be sufficient cause for the initial suspension or for subsequent disciplinary action.

== Criticism of Canadian censorship ==
Canada's 22nd prime minister, Stephen Harper, prior to becoming prime minister, stated "Human rights commissions, as they are evolving, are an attack on our fundamental freedoms and the basic existence of a democratic society … It is in fact totalitarianism. I find this is very scary stuff."

PEN Canada, an organization which assists writers who are persecuted for peaceful expression, has called on "the federal and provincial governments to change human rights commission legislation to ensure commissions can no longer be used to attempt to restrict freedom of expression in Canada."

According to Mary Agnes Welch, president of the Canadian Association of Journalists, "[h]uman rights commissions were never intended to act as a form of thought police, but now they're being used to chill freedom of expression on matters that are well beyond accepted Criminal Code restrictions on free speech."

A group of several dozen professors from the 7,000-member American Political Science Association contend that recent free speech precedents in Canada put academics at risk of prosecution. The group includes Robert George and Harvey Mansfield, and they have protested holding the scheduled 2009 APSA annual meeting in Canada for this reason. The leadership of APSA selected Toronto as the meeting location.

There have been multiple lawsuits claiming that censorship violates multiple basic human rights, such as Section 2 of the Canadian Charter of Rights and Freedoms which protects the fundamental freedoms of thought, belief, and opinion. These accusations have been of the violation of the rights and freedoms through certain types of censorship.

== See also ==
- List of journalists surveilled by Canadian police
- Corridart
- Free speech in Canada
- Hate speech laws in Canada
- List of films banned in Canada
- Section Two of the Canadian Charter of Rights and Freedoms
- Strategic lawsuit against public participation
- Youth Criminal Justice Act, prohibits publishing the names or images of young persons.
- Video game censorship in Canada
- "Censorship of Queer Art in Canada" in Kiss & Tell: Lesbian Art & Activism by Kristen Hutchinson, 2025. Toronto: Art Canada Institute.

== Works cited ==
- Dean, Malcolm (1981). Censored! Only in Canada: The History of Film Censorship - the Scandal Off the Screen. Virgo Press. ISBN 0920528325.
- Clandfield, David (1987). Canadian Film. Oxford University Press. ISBN 0195405811.
- Morris, Peter, ed. (1978). Embattled Shadows: A History of Canadian Cinema 1895-1939. McGill–Queen's University Press. ISBN 9780773560727.
- Seiler, Robert (2013). Reel Time: Movie Exhibitors and Movie Audiences In Prairie Canada, 1896 to 1986. Athabasca University Press. ISBN 9781926836997.
