= Safe Social Media Act =

Proposed Canadian internet regulation

Parliament of Canada
- Long title: An Act to enact the Digital Safety Act and the Digital Safety Commission of Canada Act and to make consequential amendments to other Acts
- Considered by: House of Commons of Canada

Legislative history
- Bill title: Bill C-34
- Introduced by: Minister of Canadian Identity and Culture Marc Miller
- First reading: June 10, 2026
- Status: Pending

The Safe Social Media Act, commonly known as Bill C-34, is a bill introduced in the 45th Canadian Parliament. It was first introduced in 2021 by Justice Minister David Lametti during the second session of the 43rd Canadian Parliament as Bill C-36, and died on the order paper when Parliament was dissolved on August 15. A revised version, Bill C-63, also known as the Online Harms Act, was introduced on February 26, 2024 by Minister of Justice Arif Virani during the first session of the 44th Canadian Parliament. After being stalled in the House of Commons amid a wider political crisis, proposals were made to split the child protection sections of the bill into separate legislation to ensure it could be passed before the 2025 federal election. Bill C-63 died on the order paper following the prorogation of Parliament on January 6, 2025.

Modelled after the United Kingdom's Online Safety Act 2023, Bill C-63 would have created a new duty of care of large social media platforms, requiring them to take action against content and activities deemed "harmful", and employ age-appropriate design features when the platform is used by a minor. The Act would have established a federal Digital Safety Commission and Digital Safety Office to enforce its provisions. It was opposed by the Conservative Party, free speech advocates including the Canadian Civil Liberties Association, as well as law experts and journalists, citing concerns with censorship of lawful content, potential for house arrest before an offence has been committed, and potential penalties of life imprisonment for unlawful speech.

Justice Minister Sean Fraser brought back some of the hate speech components of the bill in the Combatting Hate Act (Bill C-9), while the online components were reintroduced as Bill C-34 on June 10, 2026, by Minister of Canadian Identity and Culture Marc Miller. Bill C-34 reintroduces the Digital Safety Commission from Bill C-63 and introduces an additional ban on social media for minors under the age of 16.

== History ==
Online Harms Act

Parliament of Canada
- Long title: An Act to enact the Online Harms Act, to amend the Criminal Code, the Canadian Human Rights Act and An Act respecting the mandatory reporting of Internet child pornography by persons who provide an Internet service and to make consequential and related amendments to other Acts
- Considered by: House of Commons of Canada
- Passed: Not Passed (Note: Bill C-63 died on the Order Paper while pending in the Senate with the dissolution of the 44th Canadian Parliament.)

Legislative history
- Bill title: Bill C-63
- Introduced by: Minister of Justice and Attorney General of Canada Arif Virani
- First reading: February 26, 2024
- Voting summary: N/A (Note: Was carried by voice vote.) voted for; N/A voted against
- Status: Not passed

An Act to amend the Criminal Code and the Canadian Human Rights Act and to make related amendments to another Act (hate propaganda, hate crimes and hate speech)

Parliament of Canada
- Long title: An Act to amend the Criminal Code and the Canadian Human Rights Act and to make related amendments to another Act (hate propaganda, hate crimes and hate speech)
- Considered by: House of Commons of Canada
- Passed: Not Passed (Note: Bill C-36 died on the Order Paper while pending in the Senate with the dissolution of the 43rd Canadian Parliament.)

Legislative history
- Bill title: Bill C-36
- Introduced by: Minister of Justice and Attorney General of Canada David Lametti
- First reading: June 23, 2021
- Voting summary: N/A voted for; N/A voted against
- Status: Not passed

In March 2019, following the Christchurch mosque shooting, Minister of Public Safety and Emergency Preparedness Ralph Goodale stated that the government was planning to carefully evaluate whether social media platforms should be required to censor hate speech and extremist content. In 2021, Justice Minister David Lametti first introduced Bill C-36, which would aim to take down online hate speech and fine those who espouse it for up to $50,000. He stated that the "online world" has become the new public square and "that public square should be a safe space".

The bill failed to pass before the dissolution of Parliament for the 2021 federal election. Work on a new draft began in February 2022, with Minister of Heritage Pablo Rodriguez appointing an advisory group. The updated bill incorporated feedback from groups who felt that the proposed regulations would harm free speech, and a requirement for platforms to remove harmful content within 24 hours would "incentivize platforms to be over-vigilant and over-remove content, simply to avoid non-compliance".

The revised bill was modelled after the UK Online Safety Act 2023, proposing a "general framework that compels platforms to assess the risk posed by harmful content on their services", and "incentiviz[es] platforms to manage risk when developing their products." It would primarily target public posts on social networks and platforms that "pose significant risk in terms of proliferating harmful content", and establish a digital safety commission. An advisory group recommended that the bill also cover "misleading political communications", "propaganda", or content that promoted "unrealistic body image".

In February 2024, the bill was reintroduced as Bill C-63. In July, the Parliamentary Budget Officer estimated the bill would cost around $201 million over five years to implement. In December 2024, with progress on the bill stalled by a political crisis, Justice Minister Arif Virani stated that the Liberal Party planned to split the Online Harms Act into two separate bills focusing on child protection and hate speech provisions respectively. Plans were made to prioritize the child protection bill to expedite its passage before the 2025 federal elections. Conservative leader Pierre Poilievre stated that if he formed government he would repeal Bill C-63, describing it as censorship and too costly.

Ultimately, Bill C-63 was not passed before the prorogation and dissolution of Parliament, and died on the order paper. During the election campaign, the Liberal Party—now led by Mark Carney—promised to target the online sexual extortion and exploitation of minors, and the use of deepfakes to create non-consensual sexual images. When making the announcement, Carney stated "large American online platforms have become seas of racism, misogyny, antisemitism, Islamophobia, and hate" and that his government would act on online harms.

In June 2025, Justice Minister Sean Fraser stated that the Liberals were exploring whether the Online Harms Act would be simply reintroduced or rewritten when brought back in the 45th Canadian Parliament, as he wanted to have a "fresh consideration of the path forward".

In September 2025, Fraser introduced the Combatting Hate Act (Bill C-9) which included some of the hate speech components of the bill. Fraser previously stated that the other parts of the former Online Harms Act would see significant engagement from Minister of Canadian Identity and Culture Steven Guilbeault and Minister of Artificial Intelligence and Digital Innovation Evan Solomon to be updated to take into account technological developments made since its original introduction, such as generative artificial intelligence.

In June 2026, Bill C-34, the Safe Social Media Act, was introduced by Minister of Canadian Identity and Culture Marc Miller. The bill reintroduces the proposal to establish a Digital Safety Commission and additionally proposes a ban on social media for minors under the age of 16.

== Contents ==
Bill C-63 focused on amendments to the Criminal Code, the Canadian Human Rights Act, and internet child pornography laws to enhance regulatory scrutiny surrounding specific types of "harmful" online content and activities, including fomenting hatred, inciting violence, violent extremism, or terrorism, "sexually victimiz[ing] a child or victimiz[ing] a survivor", revenge porn, bullying a child, and content that induces a child to perform self-harm. The bill proposed establishing a Digital Safety Commission, Digital Safety Office, and the position of Digital Safety Ombudsman, whose responsibilities would be to create regulations to enforce the Act's provisions, and contribute to the development of standards for internet safety.

Social media services covered under Bill C-63 would have faced regulatory obligations enforced by the Digital Safety Commission, including displaying a duty of care in implementing "adequate" measures to reduce the risk of users being exposed to "harmful" content, and preventing content that sexually victimizes a child or revictimizes a survivor, or intimate content communicated without consent, from being accessible to Canadian users (when identified by the operator or reported by users). To protect minors, they would have also been required to implement age-appropriate design features determined by the Digital Safety Commission.

Bill C-63 would have amended the Criminal Code to add a definition of "hatred" as "the emotion that involves detestation or vilification and that is stronger than disdain or dislike". Justice Minister Arif Virani stated that the definition was based on the standard of hate speech already accepted by courts, and would not cover "awful but lawful" content such as insults and political speech that do not exceed this standard.

Bill C-34, brought forward in the 45th Parliament, reintroduces the Digital Safety Commission and sets safety criteria and guidelines for social media and AI chatbots.

== Reception ==
Facebook whistleblower Frances Haugen expressed support for the Bill C-63 stating that it was "one of the best bills that has been proposed today". Emily Laidlaw, a research chair in cybersecurity at the University of Calgary writing for The Globe and Mail, opined that the bill successfully balances "between free expression and protection from harm".

University of Ottawa law professor Michael Geist noted that Bill C-63 was "better than what the government had planned back in 2021" during the consulting period. However, he felt that it still contained several "red flags", including definitions that could be interpreted in an overly broad manner, the "remarkable" powers that would be held by the proposed Digital Safety Commission, and that "the provisions involving the Criminal Code and Canadian Human Rights Act require careful study as they feature penalties that go as high as life in prison and open the door to a tidal wave of hate speech related complaint". In particular, he expressed concern that the phrase "is likely to foment detestation or vilification of an individual or group of individuals on the basis of a prohibited ground of discrimination" in the bill opens the door to weaponizing complaints. Geist noted that the bill "feels like the first Internet regulation bill from this government that is driven primarily by policy rather than implementing the demands of lobby groups or seeking to settle scores with big tech."

Marcus Gee writing for The Globe and Mail, opined that discourse surrounding Israel and Palestine in light of the Gaza war, such as chants including "From the river to the sea", could be subject to the Bill C-63's life imprisonment penalty for advocating genocide. The Canadian Civil Liberties Association was critical of the bill, including the part pertaining to children. The CCLA expressed concern with the bill censoring "healthy conversations among youth under 18 about their own sexuality and relationships". Award-winning Canadian author Margaret Atwood said she believed the bill would result in thoughtcrime and called it "Orwellian", noting the potential of house arrest and electronic tagging for those deemed by a judge to be at risk of committing an online hate crime even if they have not yet done so.

== See also ==
- Online Streaming Act
- Online News Act
- Protecting Young Persons from Exposure to Pornography Act
- Lawful Access Act
