= Broadcasting Act (Canada) =

Canadian law regarding broadcasting and telecommunications

Parliament of Canada
- Long title: An Act respecting broadcasting and to amend certain Acts in relation thereto and in relation to radiocommunication
- Citation: S.C. 1991, c. 11
- Enacted by: Parliament of Canada
- Assented to: 1 February 1991
- Administered by: Canadian Heritage

Amended by
- Online Streaming Act

Related legislation
- Telecommunications Act; Radiocommunication Act
- Status: Amended

The Broadcasting Act (French: Loi sur la radiodiffusion), given royal assent on 1 February 1991, is an act of the Parliament of Canada regarding broadcasting of telecommunications in the country.

The Broadcasting Act outlines broadcasting policy of Canada; defines the role of the Canadian Radio-television and Telecommunications Commission (CRTC) as the broadcasting regulator; and sets out the mandate of CBC/Radio-Canada. The stated goal of the Broadcasting Act is to maintain Canada's cultural fabric—thereby strengthening its economic, political, and social structures—by supporting the country's creative industries and ensuring the availability and accessibility of Canadian music and stories, among other things.

On 3 November 2020, Heritage Minister Steven Guilbeault introduced legislation (Bill C-11) that would update the Act to include online broadcasting services.

== History ==
The first version of the Broadcasting Act received royal assent on 23 June 1936, and was subsequently updated in 1958. The 1958 Act created the Board of Broadcast Governors (BBG) to replace the Canadian Broadcasting Corporation as the regulator for broadcasting in Canada. In 1968, the Broadcasting Act would be updated yet again, this time creating the Canadian Radio and Television Commission (CRTC) to replace the BBG. (The CRTC’s name was changed in 1976 to Canadian Radio-television and Telecommunications Commission, reflecting the transfer of telecommunications regulatory responsibilities to it from the Canadian Transportation Commission.)

The 1968 legislation would receive amendments in 1991, whereupon it would become the present-day legislation. This would be the last major reform of the Broadcasting Act—prior to the wide availability of the Internet.

=== Canadian Radio Broadcasting Act, 1932 & 1933 ===
In 1932, Prime Minister R. B. Bennett established a parliamentary committee, the Special Committee on Radio Broadcasting, to hold hearings in order to determine the major concerns facing Canadian broadcasters, upon which the committee would make subsequent recommendations. In March and April, the Committee heard from various witnesses who made arguments regarding federal versus provincial control, as well as private versus public broadcasting.

The Committee reported to Parliament in May, presenting a short report that emphasized the importance of radio broadcasting in regard to national needs related to educational, social, and cultural development. The Committee suggested the development of a new public broadcasting system that would include: a) nationally-owned high-powered stations, and b) secondary, low-powered stations to be used for community, educational, and experimental purposes. This new system would receive revenue from both advertising and licensing fees, and would be run by a three-person commission (as well as provincially-appointed assistant commissioners) that has the authority to regulate all aspects of the system.

On 26 May 1932, the Bennett government passed the Canadian Radio Broadcasting Act, largely based on the recommendations of the Committee. This Act would create the first broadcasting regulatory body in Canada, the Canadian Radio Broadcasting Commission (CRBC), tasked with regulating and controlling all Canadian broadcasting, as well as with establishing a national service. The Act also stated that the air is a public asset and therefore the government has a role to play in monitoring its use.

Amendments were made to the Canadian Radio Broadcasting Act the following year, making the CRBC accountable to Cabinet rather than Parliament, and thus giving the Commission more power over hiring decisions, revenue spending, and station purchases. One of the first major decisions of CRBC would be to place a 40% limit on foreign programs.

=== Broadcasting Act, 1936 & 1949 ===
In 1936, C. D. Howe was appointed as the minister responsible for broadcasting, and in March, creates a new parliamentary committee on radio broadcasting that looks into the general performance of the CRBC.

On May 26, the Committee tables its report, advocating a) the creation of a national corporation to oversee public broadcasting; b) making this new corporation the regulatory authority over broadcasting; and c) greater co-operation between this new public corporation and private radio stations

The following month, Howe introduces the Canadian Broadcasting Act to create a new broadcasting agency and dissolve the CRBC. This legislation received royal assent on 23 June 1936 and created the CBC as the regulator for broadcasting in Canada.

In 1949, a Royal Commission on National Development in the Arts, Letters and Sciences (or the Massey Commission) is created, with the mandate to study radio and television broadcasting in Canada. Tabling its report, one of the suggestions made by the Commission would be to provide more funds to the CBC via a statutory grant in order to resolve the corporation's negative financial situation. In accordance with this advice, among others, the Broadcasting Act is amended, providing the CBC with a statutory grant for five years.

=== Broadcasting Act, 1958 & 1968 ===
On 18 August 1958, the Diefenbaker government introduced a new Broadcasting Act.

This legislation would include a plan to create a new regulatory body called the Board of Broadcast Governors (BBG) as well as to re-establish the role of the CBC, thereby making the main method of public intervention in broadcasting be done via regulation. The new Act would also affirm that, though the CBC operates a national service, the BBG would be in charge of the national system; therefore, the CBC must report to both its Minister and the BBG. Moreover, it would make private and public broadcasting services be seen as equal, and place a 25% limit on foreign ownership.

In 1961, a Special Committee on Broadcasting is formed once again. One of the issues to be addressed by the Committee would be the prevalence of a new technology called community antenna television, in which wired systems take over-the-air programming and retransmit them to households via cable.

The BBG's chair, among others, question whether cable could be considered as a type of broadcasting, while CBC president Alphonse Ouimet argued that the definition of broadcasting found in the Broadcasting Act ought to be expanded to include cable. Another suggestion would be to redefine the concept of broadcasting itself, changing it from something that is associated with the transmission and control of airwaves to the actual "end effect," whereby what really matters is the end reception of programs by households. Considering these issues, the Committee would suggest a reference to the Supreme Court on questions regarding a) constitutional jurisdiction over cable (i.e., wired systems), and b) whether such systems can be deemed as broadcasting under the Broadcasting Act.

Finally, in 1963, Douglas Fisher introduced amendments to the Broadcasting Act to cover "any system operated for a profit that took out of the air Hertzian waves and rebroadcast them to wired systems in homes."

Cable systems remain unregulated at this time and their growth continues to depend solely on the market. In March 1964, a committee consisting of BBG and Department of Transport members suggests that one way to reassert federal jurisdiction for cable is to expand the mandate of the BBG. By extending the "objects and purposes" of the Act to include both stations that receive commercial broadcasting and stations that feed cable relay systems, the BBG can regulate these entities so that they perform in a way "consistent with the public interest in the reception of a varied and comprehensive broadcasting service." In May, a Special Advisory Committee on Broadcasting is created to study the Broadcasting Act and recommend changes.

On 17 October 1967, the Canadian government introduced legislation designed to establish "a statutory policy for broadcasting in Canada and to assign the responsibility for interpretation and implementation of that policy to an independent public authority." Among other things, the bill sought to establish a new regulatory authority, the Canadian-Radio Television Commission (CRTC), as well as laying the groundwork for the imminent regulation of cable by including the term "broadcasting undertaking" to include both transmitting and receiving enterprises.

The Broadcasting Act is passed on 7 February 1968, becoming law on April 1. As part of the new legislation, the newly created CRTC would replace the BBG as the entity to oversee all aspects of the Canadian broadcasting system.

=== 1970s to 1990s ===
On 15 January 1970, CRTC Chair Pierre Juneau stated that regulating cable under a federal regulatory authority was in accordance with the objectives of the Broadcasting Act. In 1973, with Gérard Pelletier as Minister of Communications, the Canadian government published a green paper titled "Proposals for a Communications Policy for Canada." The paper warns against direct broadcast satellites and computer systems following the path of cable, which had gone unregulated for years before it finally came under the Broadcasting Act.

The 1968 Act would receive amendments in 1991, whereupon it would become the current Act. This would be the last major reform of the Broadcasting Act—prior to the wide availability of the Internet.

== Structure ==
The Broadcasting Act covers three main sections: a broadcasting policy for Canada; the regulatory powers of the CRTC; and the operating procedures and policies for the Canadian Broadcasting Corporation.

The Act imposes a Canadian-owned and controlled system of broadcasting and includes provisions regarding Canadian content in programming and production. It encourages the development of Canadian expression and the use of Canadian talent and creative resources. There is also a specific emphasis on reflecting Canada's cultural diversity: section 3 states that programming and employment opportunities should serve the needs and interests of all Canadians, and reflect their various circumstances.

The Broadcasting Act emphasizes that each broadcaster is responsible for its own programs and that a high standard of programming is expected. There is no specific reference, however, to address violent programming or hate propaganda.

The CRTC addresses issues of media violence, and hate messaging through its regulations for radio, television, speciality services and pay-television.

If a broadcaster fails to follow the Broadcasting Act policies or regulations, the CRTC may invoke a number of penalties — such as imposing fines or limiting or denying a station's application for licence renewal.

== Proposed amendments ==
The 1991 amendment would be the last major reform of the Broadcasting Act—prior to the wide availability of the Internet.

In the 2017 federal budget plan, the Canadian Government proposed a review and modernization of the Broadcasting Act, as well as the Telecommunications Act, in order to "ensure that Canadians continue to benefit from an open and innovative Internet." In this review, the Government would "look to examine issues such as telecommunications and content creation in the digital age, net neutrality and cultural diversity."

In mid-September later that year, the Governor in Council issued an order to the CRTC to create a report on "new distribution models for broadcasting, and the extent to which they will ensure a vibrant domestic market that supports Canadian content production." The report was released by CRTC the following year, on 31 May 2018, in a digital-only, interactive format. Entitled "Harnessing Change", the report recommended that all those who benefit from operations in Canada also contribute to the production of Canadian content.

Following the report, in June 2018, the Government launched the "Broadcasting and Telecommunications Legislative Review," appointing an external panel to review the issues first outlined in the 2017 budget, i.e. the Canadian communication legislative framework. On 13 December 2019, the mandate letters for the minister of Canadian heritage and the minister of industry included commitments to modernize the Broadcasting Act and to ensure that "internet giants" contribute to Canadian content in both official languages.

On 29 January 2020, the Review Panel presented their final report, titled "Canada's Communications Future: Time to Act", to Navdeep Bains, minister of industry, and to Steven Guilbeault, minister of Canadian heritage. In it, the Panel insists to include online broadcasters in Canada's regulatory framework. The panel also called for the end of advertising on the CBC, while recommending streaming services (like Netflix and Amazon Prime Video) be mandated to fund the creation of Canadian content.

=== Online Streaming Act ===
On 3 November 2020, Minister of Canadian Heritage Steven Guilbeault proposed legislation to update the Act to account for the increased prominence of internet video and digital media, acting upon the urgent recommendations by the Review Panel to add internet undertakings to the regulatory oversight of the CRTC.

Bill C-10 has faced mixed responses. Critics of the proposed legislation have argued that it vests an incredible amount of power to the CRTC, who are unelected regulators and receive very little guidance from Parliament or the government. University of Ottawa professor Michael Geist acknowledged that the bill removes a number of long-standing policies from the Act that were intended to protect Canada's broadcasting system, including the requirement that all broadcasters be Canadian-owned and controlled, and the expectation that broadcasters make "maximum use, and in no case less than predominant use" of Canadian talent in programming,

The removal of an exception for user-generated content on social media from the bill has also faced criticism for potentially enabling internet censorship; former CRTC commissioner Peter Menzies stated that "granting a government agency authority over legal user generated content — particularly when backed up by the government’s musings about taking down websites — doesn’t just infringe on free expression, it constitutes a full-blown assault upon it and, through it, the foundations of democracy." Minister of Heritage Steven Guilbeault stated that Bill C-10 was intended to cover "professional series, films, and music", and argued that the bill included "safeguards" to protect individual users. Some critics have also argued that the intent of the bill was to allow a regulatory framework for the removal of copyright infringing content.

The bill was passed by the House of Commons, but was not passed by the Senate before Parliament was dissolved. The bill was reintroduced in February 2022 as Bill C-11, the Online Streaming Act. On September 22, 2022 at Bill-11's second reading, Senator Paula Simon reported on the Canadian Senate Standing Committee on Transport and Communication's (TRCM) review of Bill-11. The Senate gave third reading of the bill on February 2, 2023, returning the legislation to the House with amendments. The government rejected some of the Senate's amendments in the House, including a provision that would explicitly protect user-generated content from regulation. The Senate agreed to the bill as returned by the House on April 27, 2023; it received royal assent on the same day.

== See also ==
- Canadian Broadcast Standards Council
- Canadian content
