= Online Streaming Act =

Canadian federal legislation

Parliament of Canada
- Long title: An Act to amend the Broadcasting Act and to make related and consequential amendments to other Acts
- Passed by: House of Commons of Canada
- Passed: June 21, 2022
- Passed by: Senate of Canada
- Passed: February 2, 2023
- Royal assent: April 27, 2023
- Commenced: Partially on April 27, 2023 (Note: The Act is silent as to its commencement date. The default rule for Canadian Acts of Parliament is that when an Act is silent it comes into force on the day it received Royal Assent.); Fully Pending (Note: Section 54 of the Act as originally enacted prescribes that Subsections 40(2) to (4) come into force on a day to be fixed by order of the Governor in Council.)

Legislative history

Initiating chamber: House of Commons of Canada
- Bill title: Bill C-11
- Introduced by: Minister of Canadian Heritage Pablo Rodriguez
- Committee responsible: Canadian Heritage
- First reading: February 2, 2022
- Second reading: May 12, 2022
- Voting summary: 208 voted for; 111 voted against
- Considered by the Canadian Heritage Committee: May 24, 2022 - June 14, 2022
- Third reading: June 21, 2022
- Voting summary: 208 voted for; 117 voted against
- Committee report

Revising chamber: Senate of Canada
- Bill title: Bill C-11
- Member(s) in charge: Representative of the Government in the Senate Marc Gold
- Committee responsible: Transport and Communication
- First reading: June 21, 2022
- Second reading: October 25, 2022
- Voting summary: 49 voted for; 19 voted against
- Considered by the Transport and Communication Committee: October 26, 2022 - December 8, 2022
- Third reading: February 2, 2023
- Voting summary: 43 voted for; 15 voted against
- Committee report

Amends
- Broadcasting Act
- Status: In force

The Online Streaming Act (French: Loi sur la diffusion continue en ligne), commonly known as Bill C-11, is a Canadian federal statute. Passed by the 44th Canadian Parliament and receiving royal assent on April 27, 2023, the legislation's main goal was to amend the Broadcasting Act to take account of the increased prominence of internet video and streaming services.

The Act gives the Canadian Radio-television and Telecommunications Commission (CRTC) power to regulate and impose conditions on the operations of undertakings that conduct "broadcasting" over the internet, including the ability to impose Canadian content obligations similar to those of licensed television and radio undertakings. It also abolishes the seven-year fixed-term limit for CRTC-issued broadcast licences, adds a mechanism of imposing "conditions" on broadcasters without them being bound to a licence term, and introduces monetary fines for violating orders and regulations issued by the CRTC.

It was first introduced on November 3, 2020, by Minister of Canadian Heritage Steven Guilbeault during the second session of the 43rd Canadian Parliament. Commonly known as Bill C-10, the bill was passed in the House of Commons on June 22, 2021, but failed to pass the Senate before Parliament was dissolved for a federal election. It was reintroduced with amendments as the Online Streaming Act during the first session of the 44th Canadian Parliament in February 2022, passed in the House of Commons on June 21, 2022, and passed in the Senate on February 2, 2023. It received royal assent on April 27, 2023, after the consideration of amendments by the House. The CRTC began to implement the bill in 2024, including updating the long-standing Canadian content rules for film and television to provide more flexibility and incentivize Canadian copyright ownership of programming, and proposing Canadian content expenditure requirements on foreign-owned streaming services with more than $25 million in annual revenue.

Supporters of the bill state that it allows the CRTC to compel foreign streaming services to follow similar regulatory obligations to conventional radio and television broadcasters, and government officials projected that mandating participation in the Canada Media Fund by online broadcasters would result in at least $830 million in additional funding by 2023. The opposition has directed criticism at the bill for granting a large amount of power to the CRTC, who are unelected regulators and receive very little guidance from Parliament or the government. Its unclear applicability to user-generated content on social media services has also faced concerns that it infringes freedom of expression, and that the bill would extraterritorially subject any form of audiovisual content distributed online via platforms accessible within Canada to regulation by the CRTC. The bill also faced criticism over the lack of transparency in its legislative process, with both instances of the bill facing arbitrarily limited time periods for their clause-by-clause review, thus limiting the amount of debate and discussion of individual amendments.

The new Canadian programming expenditure mandates for foreign streaming services faced lawsuits from industry groups, which are pending in the Federal Court of Appeal. In June 2026, Minister of Canadian Identity and Culture Marc Miller ordered the CRTC to review an expanded suite of expenditure requirements it announced in May 2026, arguing that they would result in increased operating costs that would be passed on to Canadian consumers.

== History ==
An Act to amend the Broadcasting Act and to make related and consequential amendments to other Acts (Note: Bill C-10 did not have a short title.)

Parliament of Canada
- Long title: An Act to amend the Broadcasting Act and to make related and consequential amendments to other Acts
- Passed by: House of Commons of Canada
- Passed: June 21, 2021
- Considered by: Senate of Canada
- Passed: Not Passed (Note: Bill C-10 died on the Order Paper while pending in the Senate with the dissolution of the 43rd Canadian Parliament.)

Legislative history

Initiating chamber: House of Commons of Canada
- Bill title: Bill C-10
- Introduced by: Minister of Canadian Heritage Steven Guilbeault
- First reading: November 3, 2020
- Second reading: February 16, 2021
- Third reading: June 21, 2021
- Committee report

Revising chamber: Senate of Canada
- Bill title: Bill C-10
- Member(s) in charge: Representative of the Government in the Senate Marc Gold
- First reading: June 22, 2021
- Second reading: June 29, 2021

Amends
- Broadcasting Act
- Status: Not passed

On January 29, 2020, the Broadcasting and Telecommunications Legislative Review Panel issued a report to Minister of Heritage Steven Guilbeault and Minister of Innovation, Science and Industry Navdeep Bains, calling for reforms of Canada's broadcasting system to account for digital media. Among other reforms, the panel urgently recommended that any company "with significant Canadian revenues" that distributes or curates audio, audiovisual, or news content be required to register with and be regulated by the CRTC (which the review proposed to be renamed to the "Canadian Communications Commission" to signify its wider scope), and become obligated to make expenditures towards the creation of Canadian content (just as licensed radio and television broadcasters must do under the existing Broadcasting Act and CRTC policy). The CRTC does not currently regulate internet content.

The panel's urgent recommendations were incorporated into Bill C-10. The bill is the first in a series of three bills intended to address online platforms and their influence in Canada, alongside a proposed "online harms" bill that will seek to address online hate speech. On November 3, 2020 the bill had its First Reading and went on to complete its Second Reading on February 16, 2021 and was referred to the Standing Committee on Canadian Heritage (CHPC).

On June 1, 2022, a proposed amendment by the Conservatives to reinstate a clause excluding user-generated content from the scope of the bill, citing various concerns from critics and media outlets, was voted down by the House. The Liberals, with support of the Bloc, subsequently passed a motion of time allocation in order to limit debate of the bill (the first such motion in 20 years, and only the third overall) to five hours, after which the Heritage Committee was required to conclude its clause-by-clause review. Guilbeault cited "systematic obstruction" of the bill by Conservatives.

As a result of the effective "gag order", a number of amendments were voted on with no discussion or publication of the amendments permitted. On June 14, another motion was introduced to only allow one hour of debate for the amended bill when it returned to the House, and only 75 minutes for the third reading. On June 15, the aforementioned amendments were voided by Speaker Anthony Rota, for having been passed by the Heritage Committee after the five-hour period expired. During a late-night session on June 21, most of the voided amendments were reintroduced, and the bill was passed by the House of Commons 196–112 during its third reading. It awaited Senate approval, but was unable to do so before Parliament was dissolved for the 2021 federal election.

The bill was reintroduced in February 2022 as the Online Streaming Act, or Bill C-11 on February 2, 2022. Once again, in June 2022 debate was largely curtailed by providing only three, 120-minute sessions for a clause-by-clause review, after which all remaining proposed amendments were voted on with no discussion or publication permitted.

On May 20, 2022, CRTC Chair Ian Scott stated that the legislation would allow for user-generated content to be regulated but also stated that CRTC would not seek to do so. Minister of Heritage Pablo Rodriguez would later replace Scott with Vicky Eatrides as the new chair of the CRTC on January 5, 2023.

The bill was passed by the House of Commons 208–117 on June 21 during its third reading, and was sent to the Senate for review. Following the successful passage of the bill through the Senate, on March 7, 2023, Minister of Heritage Rodriguez and his caucus rejected a key amendment by the Senate that protected against the regulation of user-generated content. On April 27, 2023, the Senate voted 52–16 to approve other amendments that had been considered by the House of Commons, thus passing the bill. It received royal assent the same day.

== Contents ==
The bill consists primarily of amendments to the Broadcasting Act, along with consequential and related amendments to existing legislation such as Canada's Anti-Spam Legislation, the Cannabis Act, the Copyright Act, and the Canadian Radio-television and Telecommunications Commission Act.

The exact regulatory policies would be determined by the CRTC based on its interpretation of the amended Broadcasting Act.

=== Broadcasting policies of Canada ===
The broadcasting policy of Canada as defined by the Broadcasting Act is amended, stating that the broadcasting system must serve the needs and interests of all Canadians (including age groups, economic backgrounds, ethnic groups, disabilities, and gender identities among other categories) via programming and employment opportunities.

The CRTC is given the authority to impose conditions on broadcasters to uphold the broadcasting policy of Canada, including the production, presentation, and discoverability of Canadian content, accessibility of content to individuals with disabilities, and other regulatory matters similar to the current conditions of licence used to regulate broadcasters. Conditions would not be bound to licence terms.

The licensing framework for broadcasters is modified to remove the seven-year limit for fixed terms, and authorize the CRTC to issue indefinite licences. The CRTC will be prohibited from imposing any obligation on the industry that "does not contribute in a material way to implementing the broadcasting policy for Canada." The Act introduces monetary penalties for violating any regulation or order issued by the CRTC, with fines of up to C$25,000 for the first offence by an individual, and up to $10 million for the first offence by a corporation.

=== Online undertakings ===
The Act is amended to include a definition of online undertakings, which are any internet service that broadcasts programs over the internet. The Act currently defines programs as "sounds or visual images, or a combination of sounds and visual images, that are intended to inform, enlighten or entertain, but does not include visual images, whether or not combined with sounds, that consist predominantly of alphanumeric text". The definition of broadcasting undertaking and broadcasting under the Act is also amended to include online transmission.

Foreign online undertakings are excluded from the requirement that all broadcasters be owned by Canadians, but are expected to "make the greatest practicable use of Canadian creative and other human resources", and "contribute in an equitable manner to strongly support the creation, production and presentation of Canadian programming".

Online undertakings are not required to be licensed by the CRTC. However, the Act gives the CRTC power to impose regulatory conditions and obligations on them as with all other broadcasters, such as giving prominence to Canadian content on their platforms (although the bill prohibits mandating that algorithms be used to do so), paying expenditures in support of Canadian productions, and being compelled to provide information to the Commission on such matters when requested.

The Act applies to programs on a social media service that are uploaded by "the provider of the service or the provider's affiliate, or the agent or mandatary of either of them", or otherwise covered under regulations created by the CRTC, making regulations that consider (Section 4.2(2)):

- Whether the program, uploaded to an online undertaking that operates a social media service, generates revenue directly or indirectly.
- Whether the program has been broadcast via a broadcast undertaking that must be licensed or registered with the CRTC, and is not a social media service.
- Whether the program has been "assigned a unique identifier under an international standards system."

The regulations do not apply to programs that consist "only of visual images" (Section 4.2(3b)), and programs "of which neither the user of a social media service who uploads the program nor the owner or licensee of copyright in the program receives revenues" (Section 4.2(3a)).

A person is not considered to be carrying on a broadcasting undertaking for the purposes of the Act if (Section 3.2):

- They are uploading programs to a social media service for transmission to other users over the internet, and are not "the provider of the service or the provider’s affiliate, or the agent or mandatary of either of them."
- The transmissions are "ancillary" to a business not normally engaged in broadcasting to the public, and are "intended to provide clients with information or services directly related to that business."
- The transmissions are part of the operations of an educational institution, library, or museum.
- The transmissions are part of the operations of a performing arts venue for the purposes of a live presentation.

== Implementation ==
In May 2024, the CRTC stated that the implementation of the Act's regulatory frameworks would occur by late-2025—delayed from an original target of late-2023—with consultations continuing into 2026 on matters such as required contributions to the production of Canadian content, diversity and inclusion, updates to the definition of Canadian content for music and audio-visual productions, and other reforms to the CRTC's regulatory processes.

=== Mandated funding of Canadian content by foreign streaming services ===
In June 2024, the CRTC proposed that foreign streaming services that are not affiliated with a Canadian broadcaster, and have more than CA$25 million in annual revenue, be required to contribute 5% of their annual revenue to various funds supporting the production of Canadian content.

Audio-based services would be required to contribute to FACTOR and Musicaction (2%), the Canadian Starmaker Fund and Community Radio Fund (0.5% each), the Indigenous Music Office (0.15%), and other direct expenditures (0.35%). Audio-visual services must contribute to either the Canada Media Fund or direct expenditures into "certified" Canadian content (2%); the Black Screen Office Fund, the Canadian Independent Screen Fund for BPOC Creators, and/or the Broadcasting Accessibility Fund (0.5%); funding to independent productions in official language minority communities (OLMCs, 0.5%); and to the Indigenous Screen Office Fund (0.5%). 1.5% from all affected services must fund the production of local news, which is directed to the existing Independent Local Media Fund for audio-visual services, and a "new temporary fund" for local radio outside of designated markets.

In May 2026, the CRTC increased this expenditure requirement to 15% as part of a wider overhaul of the mandates for Canadian programming expenditures (CPEs), which includes the existing 5% "base contribution". If a service has more than CA$100 million in annual revenue, at least 30% of the expenditure would be required fund productions where Canadian entities hold the majority of the copyrights (enhanced partnerships), and at least 30% must be used to fund the acquisition and production of French-language programming (with at least half of this being original programming resulting from enhanced partnerships).

=== Updates to the definition of Canadian content ===
On 18 November 2025, the CRTC announced updates to the regulatory policies for Canadian content in regards to audio-visual works (including film and television), which are intended to provide more flexibility, particularly in regards to foreign co-productions. In a new requirement, at least 20% of the copyrights to an audio-visual work must be owned by a Canadian entity. The existing quota system for the involvement of Canadians in key creative rules is maintained, but the quotas are partially relaxed if the majority of copyright ownership in the work is held by Canadian entities, and additional creative roles are eligible for inclusion in the quota. The quota system also includes incentives for the use of characters and settings that are identifiably Canadian, adaptations of works of Canadian literature, and the use of pre-existing Canadian music in soundtracks.

=== Accessibly requirements ===
In December 2025, per the amended Broadcasting Act, the CRTC announced that it will adopt requirements within the next two years for on-demand services and streaming services to provision programming with audio description and described video (DV). New pre-recorded original programming, new third-party pre-recorded scripted programming, and "partially scripted live events of national interest" will be required to offer described video. Services will also be obligated to offer the ability for users to search and filter programming for the availability of DV.

In May 2026, the CRTC established a similar mandate for closed captioning

== Reception ==
Supporters of the bill argue that it creates a level playing field between legacy and digital broadcast undertakings, and would allow the CRTC to compel foreign streaming services such as Netflix and YouTube to make expenditures towards the production of Canadian content in the same way as conventional broadcasters, and be required to prepare reports to the CRTC on the discoverability of Canadian content on their platforms. Federal officials estimated that mandating participation in the Canada Media Fund by major streaming services could generate up to $830 million in new funding per-year by 2023. Supporters of the bill also argue that it is designed to encourage the production of certified Canadian content, and discourage the practice of "foreign location and service productions" (FLSP) that extensively use Canadian resources and personnel, but do not include Canadians in specific key creative positions.

Critics of the proposed legislation have argued that it gives broad power to the CRTC, who are unelected regulators and receive very little guidance from Parliament or the government, to enforce regulations on digital media platforms. University of Ottawa professor Michael Geist criticized the bill for removing a number of long-standing policies from the Act that were intended to protect Canada's broadcasting system, including the requirement that all broadcasters be Canadian-owned and controlled, and the expectation that broadcasters make "maximum use, and in no case less than predominant use" of Canadian talent in programming. Geist also felt that the bill had failed to account for foreign productions that extensively leverage Canadian talent and resources and can be mistaken for Canadian content, but fail to meet the requirements for certification due to factors such as foreign ownership of the production.

Upon the announcement of the expenditure requirements, Barry Hertz of The Globe and Mail noted that the requirement to contribute revenue to local news was a "puzzling spillover of the Online News Act into C-11. Netflix has no desire to compete with regional journalism, and shouldn’t be compelled to pay into a sector that it has no activity in."

=== Applicability to social media ===
The bill originally contained a clause, Section 4(1), which explicitly excluded programs that are uploaded by users of social media platforms, who are not an owner, operator, or affiliate of the platform, as well as any online undertakings that consist only of such content, from the scope of the Broadcasting Act. It was removed from the bill in April 2021, due to concerns that it could be used as a loophole by video sharing platforms to declare music content as being user-generated because it was uploaded to a musician's own channel, and thus not provide reports on such content to the CRTC. Concerns were raised by critics that removing the clause would place a burden on the operators of social media platforms to regulate user content for compliance with CRTC regulations.

Former CRTC commissioner Peter Menzies stated that "granting a government agency authority over legal user-generated content – particularly when backed up by the government's musings about taking down websites – doesn't just infringe on free expression, it constitutes a full-blown assault upon it and, through it, the foundations of democracy." Guilbeault stated that the bill was intended to cover "professional series, films, and music", and argued that the bill included "safeguards" to protect individual users. Liberal MP and Guilbeault's secretary Julie Dabrusin argued that "we do not want to regulate your cat videos."

Conservative Party leader Erin O'Toole commented that Justin Trudeau's government was the most "anti-internet government in Canadian history". Conservative Party heritage critic Alain Rayes stated that "Conservatives support creating a level playing field between large, foreign streaming services and Canadian broadcasters, but not at the cost of Canadians' fundamental rights and freedoms." Conservative MP Michael Barrett accused the bill of "silencing Canadians online", and argued that Trudeau was attempting to make "every aspect of Canadian life" conform to "his Liberal vision of Canadian society". In response, Trudeau argued that free speech is "not negotiable by our government", and commented that "the tinfoil hats on the other side of the aisle are really quite spectacular."

On May 3, Guilbeault stated that the bill would be amended to reinstate a more explicit exclusion of user-generated content from the bill, stating that it "is not about what Canadians do online. It is about what the web giants do and don't do, which is to support Canadian stories and music." The amendment adds a statement establishing that the CRTC's powers over social media platforms would be limited to imposing conditions on "the discoverability of Canadian creators"; Geist criticized the amendment for merely confirming the CRTC's regulatory powers and "doubling down on [the government's] Internet regulation plans."

In a May 9 interview with CTV's political talk show Question Period, Guilbeault stated that the Broadcasting Act as amended by the bill "should apply to people who are broadcasters, or act like broadcasters", and suggested that social media users that have a large audience or derive a large amount of revenue (insofar that they have a "material impact on the Canadian economy") would also be classified as broadcasters. Concerns were raised over the comments, as they had contradicted Guilbeault's previous assurance that the Act would not apply to individual users of social networks, and it was unclear what the threshold would be under this criterion. Guilbeault later admitted that he had used "unclear language" during the Question Period interview, and argued that individual persons would not be considered broadcasters under the Act, and that social media platforms would be regulated when they themselves "produce content for Canadians to watch or listen to – for broadcast." Regarding social media platforms likely being required to improve the discoverability of Canadian content, he explained that "it does not mean the CRTC would dictate, limit or prohibit a feed or what you can post, watch or listen to on social media. As the Internet is infinite, discoverability won't limit the content you see on a feed – it will just add more."

On May 9, Kate Taylor of The Globe and Mail published an opinion piece in support of the bill, stating that concerns over the bill were being "overblown" by the Conservatives, that the Broadcasting Act has always required that it be applied by the CRTC "in a manner that is consistent with the freedom of expression and journalistic, creative and programming independence", and that all Canadian creators "deserve a broadcasting law that offers basic fairness".

The Conservative Party and the NDP supported a motion to reassess the bill's compliance with the Charter of Rights and Freedoms ("charter statement"). On May 10, 2021, members of Parliament on the Heritage Committee voted in favour of a motion requesting a new charter statement, and that Guilbeault and Minister of Justice and Attorney General David Lametti appear before the committee and an expert panel to discuss the implications of the amendments to the bill. That night, Guilbeault shared a Medium post on Twitter which claimed that opposition to the bill was the product of "public opinion being manipulated at scale through a deliberate campaign of misinformation by commercial interests that would prefer to avoid the same regulatory oversight applied to broadcast media."

On May 13, the Department of Justice issued the new charter statement, finding that the current draft was compatible with the Charter, citing that the CRTC would not be able to impose the regulations on individual users, and would have to interpret the Act "in a manner consistent with freedom of expression". Geist felt that the charter statement did not address the main concern of allowing the CRTC to regulate the presentation of Canadian content on internet platforms, stating that "suddenly now we're going to ask the CRTC to decide which cat video constitutes Canadian content, and which one doesn't."

On May 19, the Heritage Committee voted in favour of an amendment by the Bloc Québécois that ensures that the CRTC would only be allowed to enforce conditions on the promotion of Canadian content by social media platforms that are consistent with the Charter right to freedom of expression.

Upon its reintroduction as the Online Streaming Act, Section 4(1) was restored, but is now accompanied by an additional section stating that a program could still fall under the Act based on CRTC regulations, based on whether the content is being monetized, was broadcast on a CRTC-licensed undertaking, or is "assigned a unique identifier under an international standards system". Geist also noted that some of the "safeguards" that had been added to the bill as Bill C-10 were removed, and concluded that "there was an opportunity to use the re-introduction of the bill to fully exclude user -generated content (no other country in the world regulates content this way), limit the scope of the bill to a manageable size, and create more certainty and guidance for the CRTC. Instead, the government has left the prospect of treating Internet content as programs subject to regulation in place, envisioned the entire globe as subject to Canadian broadcast jurisdiction, increased the power of the regulator, and done little to answer many of the previously unanswered questions." Canadian YouTuber J.J. McCullough argued that changes to recommendation algorithms to promote Canadian content as proposed under the bill could impact the discoverability of Canadian creators.

In August 2022, it was reported, based on documents from an Access to Information Act request, that the removal of Section 4(1) from the original version of the bill was the result of lobbying by Friends of Canadian Broadcasting and the Coalition for the Diversity of Cultural Expressions (CDCE). Friends was opposed to the regulation of users, but did support the regulation of social media companies themselves.

In March 2023, Minister of Heritage Rodriguez and his caucus rejected multiple proposed amendments proposed by the Senate committee, including one that would have required online undertakings to "implement methods such as age verification" to prevent minors from accessing programs containing sexually explicit content, and compromise language for the Section 4.2(2) definition of a program, restricting it to works that are or contain commercially-released music programmings, and programs broadcast by undertakings that must be licensed by the CRTC, and undertakings that must be registered with the CRTC and "does not provide a social media service."

=== International reception ===
In May 2024, a bipartisan group of 19 members of the influential Ways and Means Committee of the United States House of Representatives wrote a letter to the United States Trade Representative saying Canada's Online Streaming Act discriminates against Americans. The letter said that the Act created trade barriers for the music streaming industry by making market access conditional on making financial contributions into government-linked funds, which would constitute non-conforming measures restricting cross-border digital trade. The congressmen urged the U.S. top trade official to work with Canada to "arrive at a flexible system respecting consumer choice and the interests of the U.S. music industry and artists." The Canadian government maintains an exemption in the United States–Mexico–Canada Agreement allows it to protect the country's "cultural sovereignty, including in the online environment."

In March 2026, Republican congressman Lloyd Smucker introduced the Protecting American Streaming and Innovation Act, which proposes that tariffs be levied against Canada for enacting "digital trade barriers targeting American streaming companies and content producers".

=== Litigation and review ===
In July 2024, lawsuits were filed against the Online Streaming Act by the Motion Picture Association – Canada (MPA—C) and the Digital Media Association; both lawsuits showed objections to the requirements that streaming services provide contributions to local news, with MPA—C president Wendy Noss stating that it was regulatory overreach and "a discriminatory measure that goes far beyond what Parliament intended", and that "our members’ streaming services do not produce local news, nor are they granted the significant legal privileges and protections enjoyed by Canadian broadcasters in exchange for the responsibility to provide local news." MPA—C objected to mandated revenue disclosures under the bill, citing that it was sensitive financial information that could be harmful if available to competitors. The Federal Court of Appeal agreed to hear the case in December 2024, placing the requirements on hold until the court's final decision.

On June 3, 2026, Minister of Canadian Identity and Culture Marc Miller ordered the CRTC to review the new CPE requirements, arguing that they would "impose new costs on the companies providing these services, which could ultimately fall on Canadian consumers through higher prices." On July 28, 2026, it was reported via a court document dated July 17 that the federal government intended to "eliminate the base contribution requirement on streaming services and to provide government funding to replace those contributions."

== See also ==
- Online Harms Act
- Protecting Young Persons from Exposure to Pornography Act
