= Bans on Nazi symbols =

Symbols that are most commonly associated with Nazism: the swastika, the doppelte Siegrune, and the SS Totenkopf

Several countries have banned the display of Nazi symbols and the flag of Nazi Germany outside of certain contexts. These bans are dictated either by broader legislation dealing with racism, hate speech, and discrimination; or by specifically anti-Nazi laws within Germany. Displaying symbols in support of Nazism is currently illegal or restricted in Australia (since 2024), Canada (since 2026), Austria, Brazil, France, Germany, Poland, Russia, Ukraine, and Argentina, among other countries and regions.

The most notable Nazi symbol is the swastika, which was appropriated and widely displayed by Adolf Hitler's regime across Germany and German-occupied Europe before and during World War II. Thus, while it was once an auspicious symbol in the Western world—as it had long been in the Eastern world—it has since become infamous for this association and consequently remains popular among neo-Nazis, but the swastika is originally and fundamentally a symbol that has been used by a variety of civilizations across Eurasia for thousands of years (including among the Germanic peoples) and holds spiritual connotations in many Indian religions, such as Hinduism, Buddhism, and Jainism. In many countries where it is otherwise banned, the symbol may be freely displayed due to legal exemptions on religious or historical grounds, although such usage is still commonly misinterpreted in Western societies.

== Summary table ==
Country	Legality of Nazi symbols	Exceptions
Argentina	Illegal	—N/a
Australia	Illegal	Banned since 2024-01, exceptions for academic, educational, or artistic use.
Austria	Illegal	Artistic, educational, or scientific purposes.
Belarus	Illegal	—N/a
Belgium	Illegal	—N/a
Brazil	Illegal	—N/a
Canada	Illegal	—N/a
China	Illegal	—N/a
Croatia	Illegal	—N/a
Czech Republic	Illegal	—N/a
Denmark	Legal	—N/a
Estonia	Legal	Intended for hate speech.
Finland	Legal	Implicit limitations likely exist. Keeping Nazi symbolism visible under certain circumstances could situationally constitute agitation against a population group. It has been confirmed in case law that exhibition of the swastika in Neo-Nazi demonstrations constitutes agitation against a population group.
France	Illegal	Artistic and educational purposes.
Germany	Illegal	Artistic and educational contexts.
Hungary	Illegal	—N/a
Indonesia	Legal	—N/a
Iran	Legal	—N/a
Israel	Illegal	—N/a
Italy	Legal	—N/a
Japan	Legal	Illegal when explicitly used to express support for fascism.
Latvia	Illegal	—N/a
Lithuania	Illegal	Artistic and educational purposes.
Luxembourg	Illegal	—N/a
Mexico	Legal	—N/a
Moldova	Illegal	Artistic, educational and scientific purposes.
Netherlands	Illegal	Artistic and educational contexts.
New Zealand	Legal	—N/a
Poland	Illegal	Artistic, educational, collecting or academic activity.
Portugal	Legal	—N/a
Romania	Illegal	—N/a
Russia	Illegal	Artistic, educational, and scientific research purposes.
Serbia	Illegal	—N/a
Singapore	Legal	—N/a
Slovakia	Illegal	—N/a
Slovenia	Illegal	—N/a
South Korea	Legal	—N/a
Spain	Legal	When associated with criminal conduct.
Sweden	Illegal	—N/a
Switzerland	Illegal	—N/a
Taiwan	Legal	None – Court sentenced use of Nazi symbols as freedom of expression protected by the Constitution of the Republic of China.
Thailand	Legal	—N/a
Turkey	Legal	—N/a
Ukraine	Illegal	Artistic, education, scientific, and historical purposes. Symbols used until 1991.
United Kingdom	Legal	During World War II (1939–1945) and for hate speech.
United States	Restrictions in the states of New York, California (to terrorise) and Virginia; legal elsewhere	Unconstitutional to ban symbols outright. New York state ban only extends to public property. California bans Nazi symbols in public pursuant to the state's hate-crime law, and Virginia bans Nazi symbols in public to avoid confusion with the Hindu swastika.
Venezuela	Illegal	—N/a

== Americas ==
=== North America ===
==== Canada ====
Bill C-9 (the Combatting Hate Act) passed in June 2026, explicitly banned "wilfully promot[ing] hatred against any identifiable group by displaying, in any public place," the swastika or the SS runes.

==== United States ====
The First Amendment to the United States Constitution guarantees freedom of speech, which the courts have interpreted to include hate speech, severely limiting the government's authority to suppress it. This allows political organizations great latitude in expressing Nazi, racist, and antisemitic views. A landmark First Amendment case was National Socialist Party of America v. Village of Skokie, in which neo-Nazis threatened to march in Skokie, a predominantly Jewish suburb of Chicago. The march never took place in Skokie, but the court ruling allowed the neo-Nazis to stage a series of demonstrations in Chicago.

=== South America ===
==== Brazil ====
The use of Nazi symbols is illegal in Brazil. Laws No. 7,716/89 and No. 9,459/97 establish imprisonment and a fine for anyone who produces, markets, distributes, or disseminates symbols, emblems, ornaments, badges, or propaganda that use the swastika to advocate Nazism.

==== Venezuela ====
Anti-hate speech laws in Venezuela criminalise the political promotion of "fascism, intolerance and hatred". However, the ruling regime of Nicolás Maduro has been criticised for using political antisemitism, such as the usage of Zionist as a pejorative.

== Asia ==
=== Iran ===
Iran has no provisions or laws regarding the use of Nazi imagery.

=== Japan ===
The use of Nazi symbols is not a crime in Japan.

=== Singapore ===
There are no specific laws banning the use of Nazi symbols, and no one has been punished for displaying Nazi-related symbols in Singapore; but anyone promoting "feelings of ill-will and hostility between different races or classes of the population of Singapore" may be arrested under the laws of sedition.

=== South Korea ===
The Republic of Korea has no provisions or laws regarding the use of Nazi imagery.

=== Taiwan ===
There are currently no provisions and laws in Taiwan that ban or regulate the use of Nazi symbols and imagery as long as it lies within the legal bounds of freedom of speech under the constitution. The use of Nazi symbolism and imagery in the country has been observed throughout the years, often causing controversy.

=== Thailand ===
The use of Nazi symbols is legal in Thailand.

== Europe ==
=== Austria ===
Austria strictly prohibits the public display and/or proliferation of all insignia, symbols, emblems, uniforms (full or partial), flags, etc., clearly associated with the National Socialist German Workers' Party (NSDAP, commonly known as the Nazi Party). There are legal exceptions for works of art (including books, films, theatre performances, computer games, and educational/memorial public exhibitions, etc.), however, these do not apply if the work in question promotes National Socialism (as this is generally prohibited in Austria). The law has been amended to include commonly recognised replacements or slightly modified depictions of Nazi symbols. Violations of the Badges Act 1960 (Abzeichengesetz 1960), which prohibits the public display of Nazi symbols, result in up to €4000-fine and up to one month of imprisonment as punishment. However, if the violation is deemed an attempt to promote National Socialism, the Prohibition Act 1947 (Verbotsgesetz 1947) applies, resulting in up to ten years of imprisonment.

However, trading Nazi medals, uniforms or other memorabilia is not illegal in Austria.

Other fascist insignia banned in Austria include Ustaše symbols that have been prominent on commemorations of Bleiburg repatriations. Banned are the Ustaše logo (U with a grenade), the Independent State of Croatia coat of arms and flag, the Croatian Defence Forces logo, as well as the Ustaše slogan Za dom spremni.

Bulgaria

=== Belarus ===
Article 341^{1} of the Criminal Code prohibits the public display, production, distribution, or storage for the purpose of distribution of Nazi symbolism or paraphernalia. The offense carries penalties of a fine, arrest, up to three years of restraint of liberty, or up to four years of imprisonment as punishment. Additionally, Article 130^{1} of the Criminal Code prohibits the rehabilitation of Nazism, with penalties including a fine, arrest, up to five years of restraint of liberty, or up to five years of imprisonment.

=== Cyprus ===
Cyprus has no legislation designed to restrict the ownership, display, purchase, import or export of Nazi flags, nor does the Criminal Code of Cyprus expressly allow for racist or other bias motives to be taken into account when sentencing.

However, use of Nazi flags in a manner likely to cause discrimination, hatred, or violence may fall under Cyprus' ratification of the UN Convention on the Elimination of All Forms of Racial Discrimination. This allows for the prosecution of anyone who expresses an idea (in public, using almost any medium including flags) which insults another person's race, religion or ethnicity.

=== Czech Republic ===
Czech Republic has no legislation restricting ownership, display, purchase, import or export of Nazi flags; indeed Czech law makes even the banning of protests involving such flags very difficult.

In 1991, in Czechoslovakia, the criminal code was amended with 260 which banned propaganda of political movements which restricted human rights and freedoms, citing Nazism and Communism. Later the specific mentions of these were removed due to their lack of clear legal definition. However, the law itself was recognised as constitutional.

The police may cancel such events only once it becomes clear that protesters are inciting hate, which is deemed illegal in the Czech Republic. Legal regulation of hate crimes in the Czech Republic is contained in Act 140/1961 The Criminal Act (amended by Act 175/1990).

Act 40/2009 prohibited promotion of movements aimed at suppressing human rights and freedoms.

=== Estonia ===
In early 2007, the Riigikogu was considering a draft bill amending the Penal Code to make the public use of Soviet and Nazi symbols punishable if used in a manner disturbing the public peace or inciting hatred. The bill did not come into effect as it passed only the first reading in the Riigikogu.

=== Finland ===
Finland has no explicit legislation aimed at controlling ownership, display, purchase, import or export of Nazi symbols. However the Criminal Code bans agitation against a population group. Agitation against a population group may be applicable when Nazi symbolism is used to threaten, defame, or insult a certain group "on the basis of its race, colour, birth, national or ethnic origin, religion or belief, sexual orientation or disability or on another comparable basis". In November 2024, the Supreme Court of Finland declined an appeal of a case of swastika flag display in a Neo-Nazi demonstration, meaning that the court of appeal's conviction was retained, effectively banning the usage of the swastika in similar demonstrations as agitation against a population group.

Finnish usage of the swastika predates the Nazi usage. As of 2024, flags containing the symbol can be found within the Finnish Air Force. However, in August 2025, the Finnish Air Force made a decision to discontinue the usage of swastikas.

=== France ===
In France, it is a crime to display Nazi flags, uniforms and insignia in public, unless for the purpose of a historical film, show, filmmaking or spectacle.

In April 2000, the International League against Racism and Anti-Semitism and Union des étudiants juifs de France (the Union of French Jewish Students) brought a case against Yahoo! which objected to the auctioning of Nazi memorabilia in France via Yahoo!'s website on the basis that it contravened Article R645-1. A French judge initially ordered Yahoo! to take measures to make it impossible for users in France to reach any Nazi memorabilia through the Yahoo! site.

=== Germany ===
After World War II, the penal code of the Federal Republic of Germany was amended to prohibit propaganda material and symbols of forbidden parties and other organisations (StGB 86 and 86a). This explicitly includes material in the tradition of a former national socialist organization. The production and distribution of such material is prohibited, as is the public display of the related symbols. Legal consequences can be a fine or a prison term of up to three years.

Examples are Nazi symbols, such as the swastika and the SS logo. It is legal to use the symbols for educational and artistic purposes, such as in films, museums, shows and video games; the latter was formerly subject to restrictions which led to German-language versions of games omitting or censoring any explicit references to Nazism until a ruling in 2018 upheld the recognition of video games as art, thus admitting them under the social adequacy exemption. Exceptions are also made when the symbols are used to condemn Nazism, rather than condone it. (i.e. A symbol of a person throwing a swastika in a trash can, a crossed-out swastika, etc. would be legal.)

=== Hungary ===
Section 335 of the Act C of 2012 on the Criminal Code of Hungary regulates the "use of symbols of totalitarianism", including the swastika, the insignia of the SS, the Nyilaskereszt, and formerly the hammer and sickle and the five-pointed red star.

=== Latvia ===
In June 2013, the Latvian parliament approved a ban on the display of Nazi and Soviet symbols at all public events. The ban covers flags, anthems, uniforms, and the Nazi swastika.

=== Lithuania ===
Lithuania banned Nazi symbols in 2008 (Article 188^{18} of the Code of Administrative Offences) under the threat of a fine. Article 5 of the Law on Meetings prohibits meetings involving Nazi and Soviet imagery.

=== Moldova ===
Moldova enacted a ban on the display, production, dissemination and possession for the purposes of diffusion of Nazi attributes and symbols in 2003. Moldova had previously banned "similar attributes or symbols that might be mistaken" for Nazi attributes and symbols, but this was found unconstitutional by the Constitutional Court of Moldova in 2015.

=== Poland ===
In 2009, § 2 to 4 were added to Article 256 of the Polish Penal Code banning the "production, recording, importing, acquiring, storing, possessing, presenting or transporting" for the purpose of dissemination of "prints, recordings or other objects" that "publicly promote a fascist or other totalitarian system of state", unless done "as part of artistic, educational, collecting or academic activity", and provides for forfeiture regardless of owner upon conviction.

=== Romania ===
The use of Nazi symbols is illegal in Romania under Emergency Ordinance 31/2002, punishable by up to 5 years imprisonment and the loss of certain rights, but enforcement varies.

=== Russia ===
Russian administrative code prohibits propaganda, production and dissemination of Nazi symbols, lookalikes, and the Rising Sun Flag with fines up to 100,000 rubles.

=== Serbia ===
In 2009, Serbia passed a law prohibiting "manifestations of Neo-Nazi or Fascist organizations and associations, and use of the Neo-Nazi or Fascist symbols and insignia".

=== Spain ===
In Spain, there is no law prohibiting the display of Nazi symbols except when associated with criminal conduct. A proposed ban is still awaiting consideration.

=== Switzerland ===
On 9 February 2022, the Federal Council of Switzerland rejected a ban on Nazi symbols and salutes.

=== Ukraine ===
The public display of Nazi and communist flags is illegal in Ukraine. The exceptions are symbols used for artistic, educational, scientific and historical purposes and symbols that were used until 1991.

=== United Kingdom ===
According to the British law, the use of Nazi symbols is not a crime, but it was from 1939 until 1945 and intended for hate speech is illegal.

== Oceania ==
=== Australia ===
The public display of Nazi flags is illegal nationwide, as well as in the states of New South Wales (2022), Queensland (2023), Tasmania (2023), Victoria (2022) (where the Nazi salute is also banned) and Western Australia (2024). Laws have also been proposed in the remaining states and territories. In June 2023, the Albanese government introduced legislation to criminalize the sale and public display of Nazi symbols and the public performance of the Nazi salute. It was introduced under the bill "Counter-Terrorism Legislation Amendment (Prohibited Hate Symbols and Other Measures)". The law went into effect on 8 January 2024, and violations are punishable by up to 12 months in prison.

On 8 October 2024, Jacob Hersant of the National Socialist Network became the first Victorian to be found guilty of performing a Nazi salute. On 4 February 2026, Hersant was sentenced to one month in jail.

=== New Zealand ===
The use of Nazi symbols is not a crime in New Zealand.

== See also ==
- Bans on communist symbols
- Censorship
- Denazification
- Legality of Holocaust denial
- Nazi chic
- Rising Sun Flag
