= Online News Act =

Canadian federal legislation

Parliament of Canada
- Long title: An Act respecting online communications platforms that make news content available to persons in Canada
- Citation: S.C. 2023, c. 23
- Passed by: House of Commons of Canada
- Passed: December 14, 2022
- Passed by: Senate of Canada
- Passed: June 15, 2023
- Assented to: June 22, 2023

Legislative history

Initiating chamber: House of Commons of Canada
- Bill citation: Bill C-18
- Introduced by: Minister of Canadian Heritage Pablo Rodriguez
- Committee responsible: Canadian Heritage
- First reading: April 5, 2022
- Second reading: May 31, 2022
- Voting summary: 207 voted for; 116 voted against
- Considered by the Canadian Heritage Committee: September 23, 2022 — December 9, 2022
- Third reading: December 14, 2022
- Voting summary: 213 voted for; 114 voted against
- Committee report

Revising chamber: Senate of Canada
- Bill citation: Bill C-18
- Member(s) in charge: Legislative Deputy to the Government Representative in the Senate Raymonde Gagné
- Committee responsible: Transport and Communication
- First reading: February 2, 2023
- Second reading: April 18, 2023
- Voting summary: 61 voted for; 14 voted against
- Considered by the Transport and Communication Committee: April 25, 2023 — June 14, 2023
- Third reading: June 15, 2023
- Voting summary: 51 voted for; 23 voted against
- Committee report

Related legislation
- Online Streaming Act
- Status: In force

The Online News Act (French: Loi sur les nouvelles en ligne), known commonly as Bill C-18, is a Canadian federal statute. Introduced in the 44th Canadian Parliament, passed by the Senate on June 15, 2023, and receiving royal assent on June 22, 2023, the act will implement a framework under which digital news intermediaries (including search engines and social networking services) that hold an asymmetric position must bargain with online news publishers to compensate them for the act of syndicating or reproducing or facilitating access to their content via their platforms.

== Purpose ==
The goal of the law is to enhance the sustainability of the Canadian digital news market by "establish[ing] a framework through which digital news intermediary operators and news businesses may enter into agreements respecting news content that is made available by digital news intermediaries." The bill and its provisions will be enforced under regulations that will be regulated by the Canadian Radio-television and Telecommunications Commission (CRTC). The exact regulatory policies will be determined by the CRTC, with public consultations to begin in late-2023, the bargaining code to be published in mid-2024, and enforcement to begin by late-2024 or early-2025.

The primary component of Bill C-18 is a provision that allows an eligible news business (acting alone or in a group) to initiate mandatory bargaining with a digital news intermediary—an online communications platform (such as a search engine or social media service, excluding platforms whose primary purpose is to allow users to communicate with each other privately) that reproduces news content in whole or in part, or otherwise facilitates access to it by any means—if it is determined that there is a "significant bargaining power imbalance" between the intermediary's operator and the news business (based on size, strategic advantages, and whether they hold a "prominent market position").

News businesses are eligible under the Act if they are either:

- A "qualified Canadian journalism organization" under the Income Tax Act.
- A licensed community, campus, or Indigenous broadcaster.
- A publisher that:
  - Is devoted primarily to "news content of public interest" and not a specific topic or industry.
  - Employs at least two journalists in Canada,
  - Is a member of a "recognized journalistic association" or otherwise has a code of journalistic ethics that follows principles of "fairness, independence and rigour in reporting news and handling sources".
- An Indigenous news outlet that publishes news content of general interest, and issues specific to Indigenous peoples in Canada.

The process involves three steps: bargaining, mediation, and "final offer" arbitration. An intermediary may request an exemption order from the CRTC if it certifies that they have entered into agreements with news businesses that meet requirements for fair compensation and other factors specified by Section 11(1).

== Reception ==
Supporters of the bill argued that it would address an imbalance between dominant tech companies and Canadian publishers, by requiring them to provide fair compensation for the dissemination of news content via their platforms. The trade association News Media Canada stated that the bill would "restore fairness and ensure the sustainability of the Canadian news media ecosystem." The logic was that in the absence of the law, intermediaries leveraged Canadian-produced news content without compensation due to their dominance, and thus hold an asymmetric bargaining position.

Writing for the Columbia Journal of Law & the Arts, Ariel Katz—associate professor at the University of Toronto Faculty of Law—argued that the bill enabled drastic measures under questionable assumptions, including new rights for news publishers that are absent in the Copyright Act, allowing collective bargaining (effectively media cartels) beyond what is allowed by the Status of the Artist Act, and providing large exemptions from the Competition Act. He argued that shielding media companies from competition, even the largest ones, would "sedate" these public watchdogs.

University of Ottawa professor Michael Geist argued that the Online News Act and Online Streaming Act represented misplaced priorities by the Justin Trudeau government, arguing that it was focusing more on using "big tech" as an "ATM" to fund Canada's media and publishing industries rather than focusing on "problematic conduct" via information privacy and data governance laws. He also criticized the bill for not taking into account the impact of generative artificial intelligence on the news industry (with its definition of an intermediary not being able to cover companies such as OpenAI), and noted that according to Heritage Minister Pablo Rodriguez, the bill would only apply to Google and Meta Platforms—leaving out other Big Tech companies such as Apple Inc. and Microsoft, as well as X (Twitter). Also, the definition of eligible news businesses was expanded, and went beyond the standards established under the Income Tax Act which govern Qualified Canadian Journalism Organizations. As a result, the bill would require payments to broadcasters that might not produce journalism or original news content. Geist argued "That isn't funding for journalism or journalists. It is creating a subsidy program that only requires a CRTC-issued licence."

Sue Gardner believed that Bill C-18 was a response to a perceived failure of legacy publishers to adapt their business models to the disruption of digital media, that media outlets "vigorously compete to maximize their presences" on Google and Facebook because of the exposure they provided, and acknowledged that in Crooks v. Newton, the Supreme Court established that hyperlinks were an "indispensable" aspect of the Internet and "should be facilitated rather than discouraged." She felt that the law would only provide benefits to legacy companies due to the eligibility requirements, and that it would reduce the accessibility of Canadian journalism if social media platforms chose to block the ability to share links to news in Canada. She also felt that a requirement for intermediaries to not discriminate against or otherwise give news businesses undue or unreasonable preference could be strictly interpreted as prohibiting any sort of algorithmic ranking or targeting of news content by intermediaries.

On August 2, 2023, Pierre Poilievre—leader of the Conservative Party opposition—stated that the bill was an instrument of censorship by the Liberal Party government; it was noted that the Conservatives' platform under previous leader Erin O'Toole had included proposals for a similar scheme.

Reporters Without Borders listed the Online News Act, and Meta's response to it, among the causes for dropping Canada's place by seven spots on the World Press Freedom Index between 2024 and 2025.

== Reaction ==
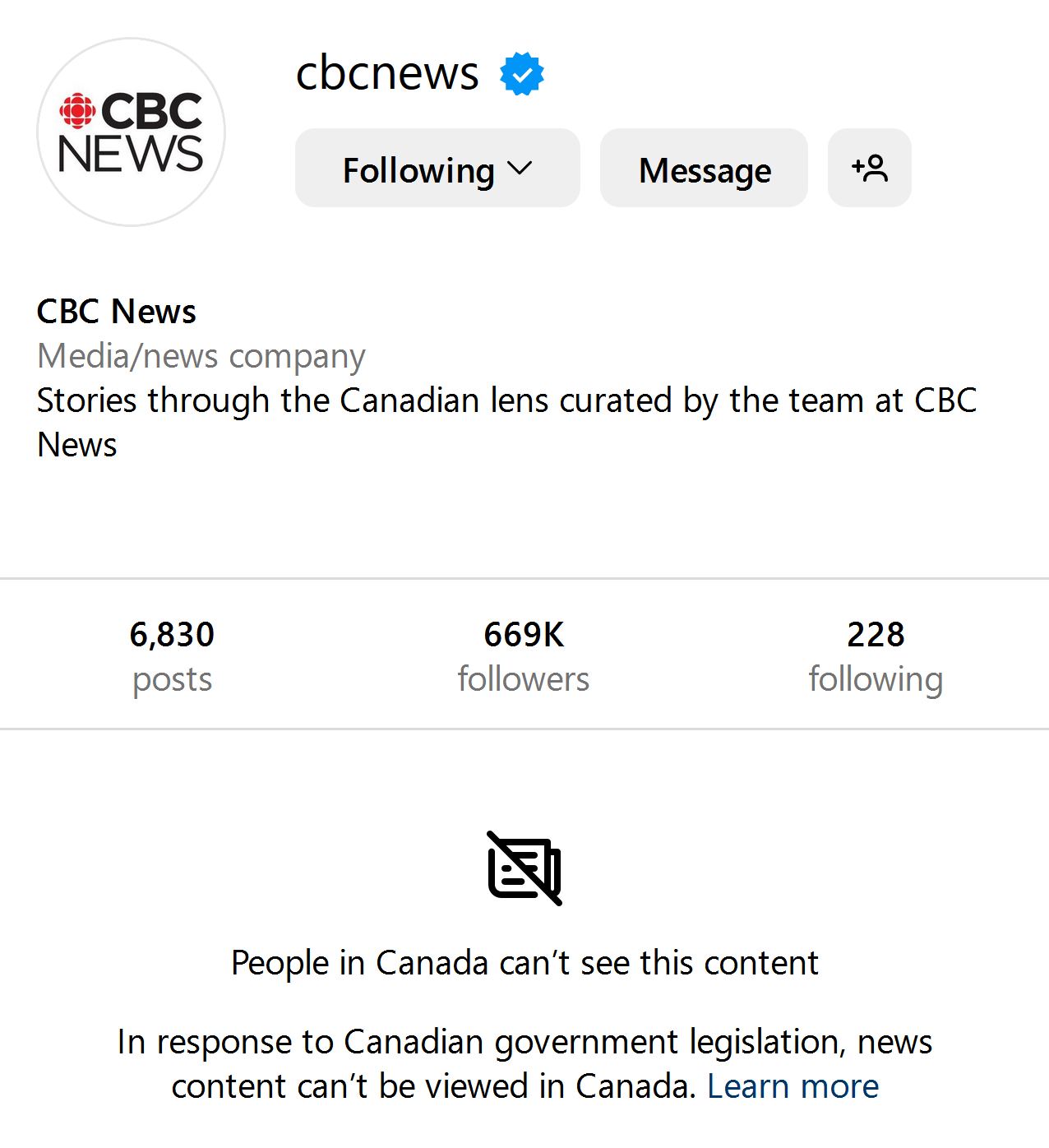
Screenshot of the Instagram page for CBC News in March 2024, showing a notice of unavailability in Canada in place of its posts.

After the bill received royal assent, Google and Meta Platforms (including Facebook and Instagram) announced that in order to relieve their obligations under Bill C-18, they would no longer make news content available to users in Canada via their services. Google's president of global affairs Kent Walker stated that the bill was "unworkable" and "exposes us to uncapped financial liability simply for facilitating access to news from Canadian publications". Due to Bill C-18, Google stated that it would be withdrawing all Canadian publishers from programs such as Google News Showcase (in which Google enters into agreements to pay news outlets to curate highlighted stories featured in widgets on Google News and its mobile apps), whose launch in territories such as Australia came amid the implementation of similar bargaining rules. Google had initially stated that it was willing to pay its share (two thirds of $150 million in estimated annual revenue from the bill), but that it wanted to contribute to a single fund rather than pay individual publishers.

Meta began to implement its blocks in late-July 2023; it is blocking all links to news content, as well as accounts of news organizations, for Canadian users of Facebook and Instagram, regardless of whether or not they are based in Canada. The restrictions had also briefly applied to the accounts of news satire website The Beaverton due to an automated classification based on metadata, but this was resolved after consultations with the site's founder. Concerns were raised that the blockage of news content from social networks could result in the wider accessibility of fake news content.

Rodriguez criticized Meta for its intent to block news in Canada rather than agree to provide compensation (as it eventually did in Australia), and stated that their actions were premature because the bill has not yet been formally implemented. He announced that the federal government would suspend its purchasing of advertising on Facebook and Instagram effective immediately, considering it inappropriate to do so "while they refuse to pay their fair share to Canadian news organizations". Other Canadian jurisdictions (including the provinces of British Columbia and Quebec) as well as the CBC, labour unions Unifor and FTQ, and media companies that supported the bill, also announced that they would pull their advertising from Meta platforms effective immediately.

On July 26, 2023, Rodriguez was reassigned to Minister of Transport, and Pascale St-Onge was named his successor. St-Onge stated that the government would continue to "[stand] our ground", and that "Canadians expect tech giants to pay their fair share".

In August 2023, a complaint was filed under the Competition Act by the CBC, the Canadian Association of Broadcasters (CAB), and News Media Canada. The complaint alleged that Meta was abusing its "already dominant position in advertising and social media distribution" and "substantial control" of the news industry, by blocking content and not allowing good faith negotiations with news businesses, thus denying them fair compensation and impairing their ability to "compete effectively in the news publishing and online advertising market". Geist considered the complaint to be "flawed", arguing that Meta did not have "substantial control" over access to news because social media accounted for 17-30% of traffic to news websites according to Senate testimony, Rodriguez had repeatedly mentioned that blocking news content was a potential "business choice" for compliance with the Act, and that the complaint contained contradictory statements alleging that blocking news was "degrading" Meta but "entrenching its dominant market power" at the same time.

Meta's decision had a negative impact on Indigenous communities, with Ku'ku'kwes News, Shubie FM (Note: Both Ku'ku'kwes News and Shubie FM are based in the Sipekneꞌkatik First Nation in Nova Scotia) and PSAs from the Mohawk Council of Kahnawà:ke being among those that had their content blocked. Other small news outlets, such as New Brunswick's River Valley Sun and CHCO-TV, as well as Nunavut's Nunatsiaq News, had also expressed concern or disapproval towards Meta's actions.

Amid the 2023 Canadian wildfires, Meta received further calls from Rodriguez and St-Onge to lift its preemptive restrictions on news content, arguing that it was hindering the distribution of up-to-date information.

On October 2, 2023, the Computer & Communications Industry Association filed comments in response to the Canadian Heritage regarding proposed regulations for the implementation of the law, and has raised concerns regarding the policy of mandatory bargaining and link taxes and highlighted how the law could violate certain provisions of the United States–Mexico–Canada Agreement.

On November 29, 2023, Google said it reached an agreement with the Canadian federal government to comply with Bill C-18, under which it will make annual payments of around $100 million CAD to a collective fund that will be managed by the media sector. Geist argued that this agreement "upends" the original intent of the bill, stating that " the government was ultimately able to strike a deal largely by changing the law, albeit through yet-to-be released regulations. After claiming for months that it would not get involved in negotiations and specifying in considerable detail what any deals between platforms and media companies needed to look like, the government dropped all of that and simply negotiated the best deal it could get on behalf of Canadian news outlets."

By December 2023, the fall in Canadian news views on Facebook resulting from Meta's news ban was equivalent to a loss of approximately 5 million views per day from official news outlet pages, according to a researcher at McGill University. The negative impact was greater for smaller sites, and some lost more than half of their audience. There was little impact on Meta, however, since after nine months the number of people using Facebook and Instagram in Canada remained stable. The Economist said Meta was emboldened by its Canadian experience. In February 2024, Meta said it would not renew the deals it had struck with publishers in Australia and, in April, a former Meta head of international news partnerships predicted Meta would "walk away" in the future when faced with a demand to pay for news links.

== See also ==
- Ancillary copyright for press publishers
- 2023 Canadian wildfires § Facebook blocking wildfire news stories
- News Media Bargaining Code, a similar Australian law
- Online Streaming Act
- Online Harms Act
- Protecting Young Persons from Exposure to Pornography Act
