= Protecting Young Persons from Exposure to Pornography Act =

Canadian federal legislation

Parliament of Canada
- Long title: An Act to restrict young persons’ online access to sexually explicit material

Legislative history
- Bill title: Bill S-209
- Introduced by: Julie Miville-Dechêne
- First reading: May 28, 2025
- Status: Pending

The Protecting Young Persons from Exposure to Pornography Act (French: Loi sur la protection des jeunes contre l’exposition à la pornographie), commonly known as Bill S-209, formerly as Bill S-210 and Bill S-203, is a Senate public bill first introduced by Senator Julie Miville-Dechêne in the 44th Canadian Parliament. The bill would make it a criminal offence for organizations to allow Internet users under the age of 18 to access sexually explicit material for commercial purposes, unless the organization employs an age verification system, or the material has a legitimate artistic, educational, or scientific purpose. The bill also gives the government the ability to obtain court orders for internet service providers to block access to websites that do not follow compliance notices issued under the law.

The bill was passed by voice vote in the Senate on April 18, 2023, during the first session of the 44th Canadian Parliament, after which it progressed to first reading in the House of Commons. After second reading, the bill was referred to the Standing Committee on Public Safety and National Security for study. Support has come from the majority of the House, including the Conservative Party, the New Democratic Party, the Bloc Québécois, the Green Party, and 15 Liberal Party MPs.

Most of former Prime Minister Justin Trudeau's Liberals have opposed the bill, as well as internet and privacy advocates, citing privacy concerns surrounding the implications of its age verification mandate, concerns that its definition of "sexually explicit material" was broad enough to apply to any service that hosts such content (even if it is not predominant). Trudeau criticized Conservative leader Pierre Poilievre for prioritizing the bill in lieu of the Liberals' wider Online Harms Act.

After being stalled in the House of Commons amid a wider political crisis, Bill S-210 died on the order paper following the prorogation of Parliament on January 6, 2025. In May 2025, after the federal election, Miville-Dechêne reintroduced the bill a third time with amendments as Bill S-209 in the 45th Parliament.

== History ==
Protecting Young Persons from Exposure to Pornography Act

Parliament of Canada
- Long title: An Act to restrict young persons’ online access to sexually explicit material
- Passed by: Senate of Canada
- Passed: April 18, 2023
- Considered by: House of Commons of Canada
- Passed: Not Passed

Legislative history

Initiating chamber: Senate of Canada
- Bill title: Bill S-210
- Introduced by: Julie Miville-Dechêne
- Committee responsible: Standing Committee on Legal and Constitutional Affairs
- First reading: November 24, 2021
- Second reading: December 8, 2021
- Voting summary: N/A (Note: Was carried by voice vote.) voted for; N/A voted against
- Considered by the Standing Committee on Legal and Constitutional Affairs Committee: February 9, 2022 - November 2, 2022
- Third reading: April 18, 2023
- Voting summary: N/A voted for; N/A voted against
- Committee report

Revising chamber: House of Commons of Canada
- Bill title: Bill S-210
- Member(s) in charge: Karen Vecchio
- Committee responsible: Standing Committee on Public Safety and National Security
- First reading: May 17, 2023
- Second reading: December 13, 2023
- Voting summary: 189 voted for; 133 voted against
- Considered by the Standing Committee on Public Safety and National Security Committee: May 6, 2024 - May 27, 2024
- Third reading: Pending
- Status: Not passed

Protecting Young Persons from Exposure to Pornography Act

Parliament of Canada
- Long title: An Act to restrict young persons’ online access to sexually explicit material
- Passed by: Senate of Canada
- Passed: June 23, 2021
- Considered by: House of Commons of Canada
- Passed: Not Passed

Legislative history

Initiating chamber: Senate of Canada
- Bill title: Bill S-203
- Introduced by: Julie Miville-Dechêne
- Committee responsible: Standing Committee on Legal and Constitutional Affairs
- First reading: September 30, 2020
- Second reading: November 3, 2020
- Voting summary: N/A voted for; N/A voted against
- Considered by the Standing Committee on Legal and Constitutional Affairs Committee: April 21, 2021 - June 15, 2021
- Third reading: June 21, 2021
- Voting summary: N/A voted for; N/A voted against
- Committee report

Revising chamber: House of Commons of Canada
- Bill title: Bill S-203
- Status: Not passed

The private member's bill was introduced in the Senate by Julie Miville-Dechêne on November 24, 2021. It was studied by the Legal and Constitutional Affairs committee of the Senate, which amended the bill to reinforce privacy protections, on the recommendation of witness Keith Jansa, of the Digital Governance Council. The bill passed unopposed in the Senate on April 18, 2023. It was sent to the House of Commons with sponsorship from Conservative Party MP Karen Vecchio. It passed second reading on December 13, 2023, and was referred to the Standing Committee on Public Safety and National Security for study.

Hearings were scheduled for May 2024. Two of the scheduled dates were fillibustered by Conservative MP Garnett Genuis, who demanded that the government release a report on the transfer of serial killer Paul Bernardo to a medium-security prison before he would allow hearings to commence. Liberal and NDP MPs called for more time to be allocated for review so that the bill does not return to the House without witness testimony. The hearings would ultimately begin on May 27.

The bill was not passed before the dissolution of the 44th Canadian Parliament. Miville-Dechêne reintroduced the bill in the Senate in May 2025, under the 45th Canadian Parliament, as Bill S-209.

== Contents ==
The bill would make it a criminal offence for an organization to make "sexually explicit material" available on the Internet to users under the age of 18 for commercial purposes, defined as images or videos where the depiction of genitalia, anal regions, or female breasts for a sexual purpose are the "dominant characteristic".

There are four possible defences for organizations accused of non-compliance with the law, including that:

- The organization had a belief that the user was 18 or older as verified by a prescribed age verification or estimation system.
- The material has "legitimate purpose related to science, medicine, education or the arts".
- The organization has received notice of non-compliance and implemented measures to prevent Internet users under 18 from accessing sexually explicit material.
- The organization operates a service that is "incidentally and not deliberately" designed to make sexually explicit material available to users.

The Governor in Council would be responsible for setting regulations relating to the bill's provisions, including determining the types of age verification or estimation systems that must be used, and appointing a minister or agency as the authority responsible for enforcing the law. When prescribing a reliable age verification system under the law, the Governor in Council must take into account whether the method complies with best practices for age verification, and protects users' privacy and personally identifiable information (PII), including whether PII is collected solely for age verification purposes, and data is destroyed once verification is completed.

Fines are set at up to $250,000 for the first offence, and up to $500,000 for a subsequent offence. If an organization does not employ compliance measures within 20 days of receiving notice of the offence, the appointed authority would have the power to request that the Federal Court order internet service providers to block all or part of the offending website, even if it does not consist solely of sexually explicit material.

== Reception ==
The bill has primarily been opposed by the adult entertainment industry (particularly Montreal-based Aylo, the largest operator of internet pornography websites), and online privacy and internet freedom advocates. University of Ottawa professor Michael Geist has been critical of the bill's expansive scope and inadequate prescription of specific, known age-verification technology, explaining that "it envisions government-enforced global website liability for failure to block underage access, backed by website blocking and mandated age verification systems that are likely to include face recognition technologies. The government establishes this regulatory framework and is likely to task the CRTC with providing the necessary administration. While there are surely good intentions with the bill, the risks and potential harms it poses are significant." He also argued that the bill can apply to any site that hosts "sexually explicit" content besides porn websites, including search engines and social networks. During hearings, deputy minister of heritage Owen Ripley reiterated the government's position that the bill would also apply to video platforms such as Netflix.

During Senate hearings, University of Montreal professor Pierre Trudel defended the bill, testifying that it would "[level] the legal playing field, so to speak, by ensuring that what is prohibited offline is also prohibited online". The first versions of the bill defined "sexually explicit material" by section 171.1(5) of the Criminal Code; on allegations that the definition was too broad, he noted that it was already understood in case law (such as R. v. Sharpe) that the Criminal Code definition applied primarily to depictions of "intimate sexual activity represented in a graphic and unambiguous fashion" intended to cause sexual stimulation, and not "casual nudity or intimacy". Geist, however, noted that the definitions used in the Criminal Code were broad out of their original context, as they were intended to be cited "within the context of other sexual related crimes", and that "contrary to Genuis’ claim, you cannot run afoul of the Criminal Code merely for putting Game of Thrones on in your home for a 16 year old".

Writing for the Institute for Research on Public Policy, Marie-Ève Martel questioned whether the bill could be enforced, as it does not prescribe any specific requirements for age verification technologies, cited concerns over the privacy and effectiveness of such systems, and that legal challenges over similar bills in the U.S. "foreshadow a legal challenge to the new law on Canadian soil, which could delay or even compromise its implementation." In its Senate brief and testimony, the Canadian Bar Association was "generally supportive of Bill S-210 and its purpose" but raised questions about the age limit and potentially overbroad defence of legitimate purpose.. The CBA was also critical of the bill's lack of specificity on how personal data will be protected, especially if the age verification solutions were to be provided by the government.

Liberals largely voted against the bill in the House of Commons, with only 15 voting in favour during its first reading, and the majority of its support coming from the official opposition Conservative Party, the New Democratic Party, the Bloc Québécois, and the Green Party. Parliamentary Secretary Kevin Lamoureux stated that "the biggest issue we need to look at is why the bill is fairly narrow in its application with respect to harms to children". The Liberals had been proposing another online safety bill—the Online Harms Act—which would establish a digital safety commission, and place an obligation on large social networks to act on hate speech, content that incites violence or terrorism, child sexual abuse material, and revenge porn. The office of the Minister of Heritage described the bill as "fundamentally flawed", stating that "experts have loudly pointed to the serious issues in this proposal around issues of privacy, security, and technology". Privacy Commissioner Philippe Dufresne suggested that the scope of the bill needed to be narrowed to overcome digital privacy concerns, and freedom of expression concerns relating to its wide definition of "sexually explicit material", which could also make it apply to services that do not otherwise focus on sexually explicit content.

Prime Minister Justin Trudeau criticized opposition leader Pierre Poilievre for prioritizing Bill S-210 over the Online Harms Act, stating that "instead of stepping up to stand for protecting our kids through responsible, serious legislation, he's proposing that adults should instead give their ID and personal information to sketchy websites, or create a digital ID for adults to be able to browse the web the way they want to." Of Poilievre's support of the bill, Geist felt that it was "decidedly off-brand" given the Conservative Party's past support for Internet freedom. Poilievre later said in an interview with CTV News that he was "against digital IDs" and "against people having to supply a driver's licence to a questionable website".

Upon its reintroduction in 2025, the bill was updated to include its own definition of "sexually explicit material", include age estimation technologies as a possible option for verification, explicitly require the Governor in Council take into account whether a verification method is privacy-preserving (as opposed to only consider), and add a carve-out for services (such as websites and search engines) that are capable of "incidentally" making sexually explicit materials available to users, and are not deliberately designed to do so first and foremost. Geist noted that these changes did address some of the previously-raised concerns over the bill, but that it "still relies on technologies that raise both privacy and accuracy concerns and gets the government into the business of evaluating those technologies as well as determining what constitutes commercial distribution, particularly for free sites."

== See also ==
- Online Harms Act
- Online Streaming Act
- Online News Act
