= Canadian Broadcast Standards Council =

Council for safety on Radio in Canada

- Abbreviation: CBSC
- Formation: 1990
- Legal status: active
- Purpose: industry self-regulation
- Headquarters: Ottawa, Ontario, Canada
- Members: commercial radio and television broadcasters in Canada
- Owner: Canadian Association of Broadcasters
- Website: www.cbsc.ca

The Canadian Broadcast Standards Council (CBSC) is an industry funded self-regulating organization created by the Canadian Association of Broadcasters to administer standards established by its own members, Canada's private broadcasters.

The council's membership includes more than 760 private sector radio and television stations, specialty services and networks from across Canada, programming in English, French and third languages. As such, the council allows the private broadcasting industry to be self-regulating; it acts as an intermediary in the regulatory process, which is governed by the Canadian Radio-television and Telecommunications Commission (CRTC). The CRTC itself generally hears complaints against only the few CBSC non-members (most notably public broadcasters such as the CBC), as well as reviews of CBSC decisions; the latter rarely lead to any additional action.

Although first suggested by private broadcasters as early as 1968, the Canadian Broadcast Standards Council was not created until 1990.

== Council objectives ==
The council has five primary objectives:

- Assist in the application of broadcast standards developed by the private broadcast industry.
- Inform the public of such standards and the council's role in self-regulation of the private broadcast industry.
- Provide a forum for public complaints should such standards be violated.
- Provide recommendations to private broadcasters and complainants, should complaint resolution not be achieved.
- Inform broadcasters of emerging societal trends and develop ways to adjust broadcast standards to meet them.

== Comparison with similar organizations ==
Citations have been issued not only for violations of the content guidelines themselves but also for failing to provide sufficient information to viewers, i.e. missing or inadequate viewer advisories, or missing ratings icons.

== Complaints process ==
If after receiving an unsatisfactory response from a broadcaster about concerns involving content broadcast by one of the members of the Canadian Association of Broadcasters, members of the public may file a complaint with the Canadian Broadcast Standards Council. The process takes some time after the complaint is raised. There is no dialogue within their process as it is purely an administrative review based on the council's own Broadcast Standards and past decisions. The exercise does not examine or re-examine the appropriateness of the current standards by the panel so community standards are not addressed. One of the many criticisms of the process is that it does not meet with stated objectives of the council as it fails to inform broadcasters of emerging and changing societal trends or develop ways to adjust broadcast standards to meet them. A written decision is supplied to the complainant citing past decisions.

== Controversies ==
In January 2011, the council's Atlantic Regional Panel ruled against CHOZ-FM in a complaint regarding the song "Money for Nothing" by Dire Straits (CBSC Decision 09/10-0818). The council ruled that Canadian radio stations must mute or otherwise edit out the word "faggot" before airing the original version of the song. The CRTC has asked the council to review their ban after they received numerous complaints about the ban. On 31 August, the CBSC reiterated that it found the slur to be inappropriate; however, because of considerations in regard to its use in context, the CBSC has left it up to the stations to decide whether to play the original or edited versions of the song. Most of the CBSC panelists thought the slur was inappropriate, but it was used only in a satirical, non-hateful manner.

On 19 October 2016, CBSC's French language panel ruled video clips showing dildos and macaroni and cheese being stirred in a pot and making 'squishy' noise from MusiquePlus program CTRL broadcast on 11 November 2015 were not considered as sufficiently explicit to be classified as 'explicit sexual content'. The original complaint claimed the CTRL episode exposed complainer's children to sexual material because MusiquePlus failed to provide viewer advisories, and the cable provider rated the material as 8+. The council ruled the macaroni video failed to meet the explicit sexual content standard, and the use of f-word in the dildo video did not have the vulgar connotation it can have in English, which allowed the word to be used if it was used only on occasion and was not used to insult or attack an individual or group. However, the council determined MusiquePlus didn't post a viewer advisory warning of explicit language and sexual content during the episode in question. But MusiquePlus has since established the proper advisories, according to the council. The council also found the episode should be rated 13+, but the 8+ rating was erroneously issued by the cable company, not MusiquePlus.

== See also ==
- Accurate News and Information Act
- Broadcasting Act (1991)
- Canadian Radio-television and Telecommunications Commission
- Censorship in Canada
- List of telecommunications regulatory bodies
- Media bias
- Radio-Television News Directors Association
- Censorship
