= Corridart =

Public artwork in Montreal, Quebec, Canada

Corridart (sometimes stylized as Corrid'Art) was an almost 6 km (4 mile) long public exhibit of monumental installation artwork that took place in Montreal, Quebec, Canada, on Sherbrooke Street from July 6 to July 13 1976. The exhibition was cancelled by the City of Montreal, two days before the opening of the Olympics. The city then undertook to dismantle the show by sending, without notice and at night, 75 workers with trucks and equipment to remove the artworks.

== Background ==
Corridart was intended to be the principal arts and cultural component of the 1976 Summer Olympics. The exhibit showcased approximately 60 artists, and the collective efforts of hundreds more in the creation of 16 installations, with additional stages at two points along the street to host hundreds of performances throughout the duration of the games.

Corridart included artworks that engaged with the history of Montreal as well as the social and economic problems that were then current within the city, province, country and world, reflecting the difficulties in striking a societal balance between increasing globalization and the desire for a national identity. Sherbrooke Street was chosen because it provided the most direct link between the urban core and the Olympic Park in the East End of Montreal, but also because it is a symbolic street in the city's history, acting as both the dividing line between rich and poor (especially before the mid-20th century), while simultaneously uniting multiple communities across two thirds of the island. Moreover, it was a street caught in the middle of Montreal's metamorphosis, as the artists were additionally commenting on the Drapeau administration's approval of the demolition of many heritage properties on that storied street.

== Dismantling of the exhibition ==
Corridart never officially opened to the public. In a controversial decision, Mayor Jean Drapeau had the entire exhibit torn down during the evening of July 13, two days before the Olympic games began. The project having been funded by the Quebec government rather than the city of Montreal, its destruction "was an illegal act, a point that would be proven in court and result in damages paid to the artists a decade later, but not by Drapeau. It set a generation of Quebec artists back considerably since the exhibit was supposed to be their international debut. It was widely reported, and not only in Canada but by the international media as well. Ultimately, it would be more than just one of the many controversies to cast a pall over the Montreal Olympics."

Most of the works were destroyed beyond repair or recognition, leading to a legal battle that lasted for ten years. Ultimately the city and the artists settled, with an $85,000 payment made to the artists. The total cost of the show in 1976 dollars for the project was a scant $386,000 (about $1.6 million in 2017 Canadian dollars), and it was considered an expensive mistake by city officials. It has been considered "the single-largest act of arts censorship in Canadian history, a desperate effort by a mayor who had lost control of his dream."

== Legacy ==
On July 1, 2001, the Leonard & Bina Ellen Art Gallery at Concordia University honoured Corridart by presenting an exhibition for the 25th anniversary of its destruction.
