= Radiocommunication Act =

1985 Canadian Act of Parliament

Parliament of Canada
- Long title: An Act respecting radiocommunication in Canada
- Citation: R.S.C., 1985, c. R-2

The Radiocommunication Act (French: Loi sur la radiocommunication) is an Act of Parliament respecting radiocommunication in Canada. It was enacted in 1985.

The Radiocommunication Act is administered by the Government of Canada's Innovation, Science and Economic Development Canada department. It governs the licensing and regulation of radio equipment and the technical certification of radio communications equipment.

Regulation of radio stations using licensed equipment is governed by other Acts of Parliament. Licensing of radio stations began in 1919, and the first Act in Canada came in 1932: the Canadian Radio Broadcasting Act, followed by the Canadian Broadcasting Act of 1936. The Broadcasting Act of 1958 established a new regulatory agency for private stations. The 1968 Broadcasting Act established the Canadian Radio and Television Commission, and was further revised in 1991. These acts are administered by the Department of Canadian Heritage.

== Related acts ==
- Telecommunications Act
