= Clause-by-clause consideration =

Clause-by-clause consideration is the consideration of a bill (a legislative proposal) on an in-depth basis. This is part of the committee stage in Westminster style parliaments. This phase of consideration is generally seen to be the most scrutinous and technical in nature as lawmaker consider each clause in a separate division of debate.

Clause-by-clause consideration takes place in a committee designated to study the bill in question. Generally speaking, clause-by-clause consideration in committee takes place in-between the second and third readings of the bill; however, the legislature may have the authority to refer a bill to a committee before the second reading stage has been completed. While studying the clauses of the bill, the committee can choose to adopt them, delete them, or amend them. However, any amendments made must remain true to the principal goal of the bill (unless the bill has not yet passed second reading).

After considering the clauses of the bill, a committee must report the bill back "with amendment" (where any range of minor, major or sweeping changes may have been made), or "without amendment" (in exactly the same form in which the bill was originally referred). If amendments were made, then the House resolves itself into a Committee of the Whole in order to consider the committee's recommendations. The House can (and often does) change, overrule in part, or entirely ignore the recommendations of a committee.

== Canadian provisions for financial bills ==
In Canada if a committee fails to return a budget, or a bill that would appropriate funds to the House with its report of recommendations by a deadline defined in the Standing Orders of the House in question, then any recommendations of the committee would be deemed to have been withdrawn and the bill will be deemed to have been reported back to the House, without any amendments. This convention is in place in order to prevent a committee from attempting to withhold supply from the government.
