= Telecommunications Act (Canada) =

1993 Canadian Act of Parliament

Parliament of Canada
- Long title: An Act respecting telecommunications
- Citation: S.C. 1993, c. 38
- Royal assent: 23 June 1993

The Telecommunications Act (French: Loi sur les télécommunications) is an Act of the Parliament of Canada that regulates telecommunications by ensuring reliable services, protecting privacy, and to protect and encourage the Canadian media. The Act is administered by the Canadian Radio-television and Telecommunications Commission (CRTC) which reports to Industry Canada. It replaced the Railway Act of 1906, which governed telecommunication prior to 1993, making it the first full legislative scheme addressing telecommunications.

Among its stipulations are prescient regulations that, in spirit, follow the general principles of net neutrality decades before the telecommunications concept arose as a matter of public debate with the rise of the internet as a common telecommunications system. For instance, internet providers are considered utilities under this law in that they can't give "undue or unreasonable preference", nor can they influence the content being transmitted over their networks.

In November 2005, an amendment was passed to allow for the creation of a national Do-not-call list under section 41.

In 2024, Bill C-288 was enacted as An Act to amend the Telecommunications Act, aimed at enhancing the transparency and accuracy of broadband service information provided to consumers.

== Bill C-8 (2025) ==
In 2025, the Minister of Public Safety of Canada introduced Bill C-8, An Act respecting cyber security, which also includes amendments to the Telecommunications Act. Bill C-8 is largely identical to Bill C-26, introduced in 2022 and later discontinued when Parliament was prorogued in early 2025. The proposal reflects the federal government’s ongoing efforts to enhance the security and resilience of Canada’s critical infrastructure and digital systems. If enacted, Bill C-8 would:

- Amend the Telecommunications Act to broaden federal authority over telecommunications networks in matters related to national security; and
- Establish the Critical Cyber Systems Protection Act (CCSPA), which would impose mandatory cybersecurity obligations on operators of designated vital services and systems.

== See also ==
- Radiocommunication Act (1985)
