= Julie Miville-Dechêne =

Canadian politician (born 1959)

The Honourable Julie Miville-Dechêne

Senator for Inkerman, Quebec
- Incumbent
- Assumed office June 20, 2018
- Nominated by: Justin Trudeau
- Appointed by: Julie Payette
- Preceded by: Charlie Watt

Personal details
- Born: July 10, 1959 (age 67)
- Party: Progressive Senate Group
- Profession: Journalist

Julie Miville-Dechêne (born July 10, 1959) is an independent senator representing Quebec. She began her career as a journalist with the Canadian Broadcasting Corporation (CBC/Radio-Canada), where she worked for more than 25 years. Among her many roles, she served as Ombudsman for the French-language services from April 2007 to August 2011. She later served as President of the Quebec Council on the Status of Women from 2011 to 2016, before pursuing a career in diplomacy. On June 20, 2018, she was appointed to the Senate of Canada, on the advice of Prime Minister Justin Trudeau, to represent the senatorial division of Inkerman in Quebec.
