= Order Paper =

Daily publication of a legislature

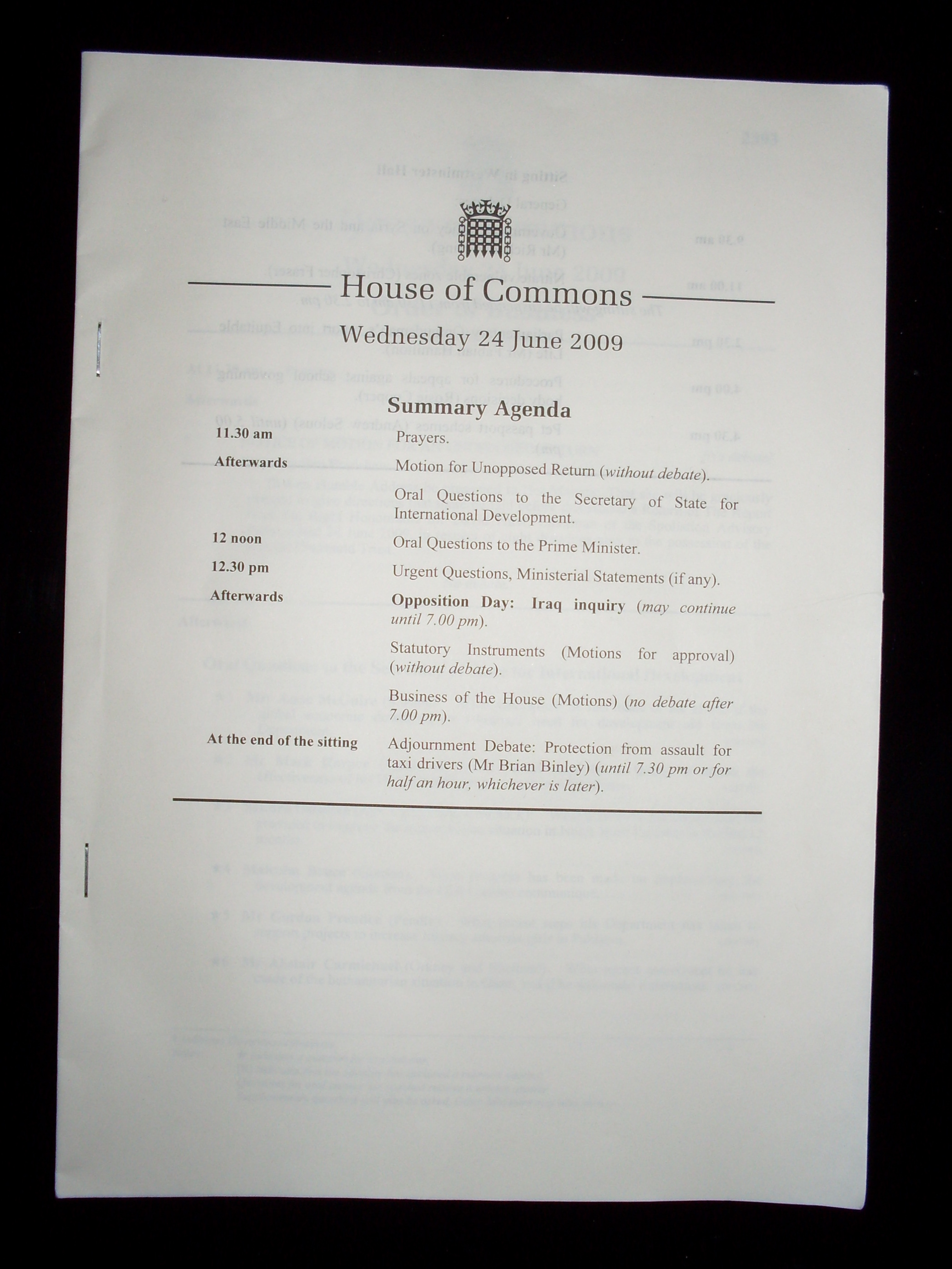
British House of Commons Order Paper from 24 June 2009.

The Order Paper (also known as the Order of Business in the UK, the Notice Paper in Australia, and the Order Paper and Notice Paper in Canada) is a daily publication in the Westminster system of government which lists the business of parliament for that day's sitting. In bicameral legislatures a separate paper is issued daily for each house of the legislature.

The Order Paper provides members of the legislature with details of what will be happening in that house, including the questions that have been tabled for departmental question sessions and members who have been selected to speak. It also gives details of when and where the standing committees and select committees will be meeting, and the list of debates to be held. Written questions tabled to ministers by members of the legislature on the previous day are listed at the back of the order paper.

British parliamentarians often wave their Order Paper during debates in the House of Commons.

== See also ==
- Meeting agenda
