= Combatting Hate Act =

Canadian federal legislation

Parliament of Canada
- Long title: An Act to amend the Criminal Code (hate propaganda, hate crime and access to religious or cultural places)
- Enacted by: House of Commons
- Enacted by: Senate
- Royal assent: June 18, 2026

Legislative history

Initiating chamber: House of Commons
- Bill citation: Bill C-9
- Introduced by: Sean Fraser, Minister of Justice and Attorney General of Canada,Minister for the Atlantic Canada Opportunities Agency
- First reading: September 19, 2025
- Second reading: October 1, 2025
- Third reading: March 25, 2026

Revising chamber: Senate
- First reading: March 26, 2026
- Second reading: April 30, 2026
- Third reading: June 4, 2026
- Status: In force

The Combatting Hate Act, also known as Bill C-9, is a 2026 Act of the Parliament of Canada to address hate crimes through strengthening the criminal code by creating new offenses to obstructing and intimidation at places of worship, schools, and other institutions.

== Legislative history ==
The bill was introduced on 19 September 2025 by Minister of Justice and Attorney General of Canada and Minister responsible for the Atlantic Canada Opportunities Agency Sean Fraser.

In March 2026, the third reading of the bill was passed by the House of Commons, and now moves to the Senate of Canada.

The law was passed and received royal assent on 18 June, 2026, and came into effect on July 18, 2026.

== Reaction ==
The Act has been criticized for placing restrictions on freedom of speech, including by the Canadian Civil Liberties Association.
