= America Alone =

2006 English-language book by Mark Steyn

- Author: Mark Steyn
- Language: English
- Subject: Demography; Sociology; Politics
- Publisher: Regnery Publishing
- Publication date: September 16, 2006
- Publication place: United States
- Media type: Print (hardcover)
- Pages: 224
- ISBN: 0-89526-078-6
- OCLC: 70866885
- Dewey Decimal: 303.48/273017670905 22
- LC Class: E895 .S84 2006

America Alone: The End of the World as We Know It is a 2006 non-fiction book by the Canadian newspaper columnist and writer Mark Steyn. It forecasts the downfall of Western civilization due to internal weaknesses and Muslim population growth in Western countries and the world generally. Based on his own observations, Steyn says that the fall of the Western world is caused by three factors: demographic decline, unsustainability of the advanced Western social democratic state, and exhaustion of civilization. By 2007, Steyn's America Alone had already convinced many American conservatives that there was an imminent and inevitable Muslim invasion. The Canadian Islamic Congress (CIC) filed Human rights complaints against Maclean's magazine—in which they accused the magazine of Islamophobia—with the Canadian Human Rights Commission, the British Columbia Human Rights Tribunal and the Ontario Human Rights Commission, based partly on Maclean's publication of a chapter from Steyn's book, "The Future Belongs to Islam".

== Overview ==
In America Alone, which is set in the context of the global war on terror, Steyn argues that "much of what we loosely call the Western world will not survive the twenty-first century, and much of it will effectively disappear within our lifetimes, including many if not most European countries." According to a July 1, 2007 The New Republic article, Steyn says that white people "are too self-absorbed to breed", while the Muslim population is increasing rapidly—the 20 million European Muslims in 2006, will have increased to over 150 million by 2015. As a result, there will be a "large-scale evacuation operations circa 2015". Europe will cede to Al Qaeda and "Greater France" will "remorselessly evolve into Greater Bosnia."

Steyn attributes the forecast fall of the Western world to three factors, demographic decline, unsustainability of the advanced Western social-democratic state, and exhaustion of civilization. Steyn based his argument of population decline on his own observation that European nations have low birth rates while Muslim nations have higher birth rates. Steyn wrote that in the 2000s, the population of the developed world declined from about 30% of world population to around 20%, while the population of Muslim nations increased from about 15% to 20%.

He argued that the advanced Western social-democratic state was unsustainable, based on his observation that the responsibilities of normal adults—such as care of the elderly, childcare, health care and insurance, have been slowly taken over by the state. Steyn argues that these programs erode humanity's basic sense of self-reliance to a point at which a more resilient group of people – Muslims in his view – will take control. He said that civilization is exhausted because Western nations are so focused on moral and cultural relativism—with "diversity" and "racism" as their new favorite words—that they are unable to see that their existence is threatened. Specifically, he argues that European nations have given up defending themselves and rely on the United States for their defense. He views anti-Americanism as a symptom of civilizational exhaustion, whether manifested by Muslims (to whom the United States symbolizes gay porn, children born out of wedlock, immodest women, and immorality) or by Europeans (to whom the United States symbolises a crude and radical Christianity, fat rednecks and uncontrolled firearms). However, in his view America is the most benign hegemonic power the world has ever seen. According to Steyn, America will be the last and only country—as all others will be taken over by Muslims—that will retain its sense of self-preservation, but this is not a given, as US enemies know that it ran from Vietnam and they hope that the United States will continue to flee when faced with a challenge.

Steyn's final argument is that the Muslim world will not need to carry out an outright attack. Instead, Europe will collapse from "wimpiness" or "multicultural 'sensitivity,'" leading to betrayal of the state's core values. Thus, during the Danish 'cartoon jihad' of 2006, Jack Straw, then British foreign secretary, hailed the 'sensitivity' of Fleet Street in not reprinting the offending representations of the [so-called] Prophet."

In a 2016 post on his personal blog, "Ten Years, and Slightly Less Alone", Steyn wrote that his book America Alone was still the "biggest story of our time". He said that, "the west's leaders still can't talk about it, not to their own peoples, not honestly....I'm glad I brought up the subject. And it's well past time for others to speak out".

Steyn cites Robert D. Kaplan, author of The Coming Anarchy, who has referred to countries and regions where "scarcity, crime, overpopulation, tribalism, and disease are rapidly destroying the social fabric of our planet" as "Indian territory." Steyn also refers to Thomas P. M. Barnett's 2006 book, Blueprint for Action: A Future Worth Creating, in which he examines potential relations between the United States and Iran, Iraq, and the Middle East, China and North Korea, Latin America and Africa in the post-9/11 world. Steyn says that the "difference between the old Indian territory and the new is this: no one had to worry about the Sioux riding down Fifth Avenue. Today, with a few hundred bucks on his ATM card, the fellow from the badlands can be in the heart of the metropolis within hours. Here’s another difference: in the old days, the white man settled the Indian territory. Now the followers of the badland’s radical imams settle the metropolis. And another difference: technology. In the old days, the Injuns had bows and arrows and the cavalry had rifles. In today’s Indian territory, countries that can’t feed their own people have nuclear weapons."

Steyn dismisses the danger of climate change, The Population Bomb, The Limits to Growth, and nuclear winter.

== Critical reception ==
The New Republic article said that by 2007, Steyn's America Alone, had already convinced the readers of the National Review—which he called "the bible of American conservatism"—of an imminent and inevitable Muslim invasion.

In his 2007 City Journal review, Christopher Hitchens praised the book as "an admirably tough-minded book." Hitchens said that, "Mark Steyn's book is essentially a challenge to the bien-pensants among us: an insistence that we recognize an extraordinary threat and thus the possible need for extraordinary responses. He need not pose as if he were the only one with the courage to think in this way."

The British novelist Martin Amis also reviewed the book in The Times and called Steyn as the "great sayer of the unsayable". Amis added, "I continue to hope that his admonitions will gain some momentum, despite the efforts of his prose style to impede it." Then President of the United States, George W. Bush, circulated copies to his White House staff after reading Steyn's book. According to Steyn, it was also read by Democrat vice-presidential nominee Joe Lieberman and Spanish prime minister José Maria Aznar. In a 2007 Spectator review by British politician and prominent Brexit campaigner, Michael Gove, he wrote that the fact that "many of Steyn's conclusions will be unpalatable to the European consensus only underlines how much a failure to face harsh truths has characterised the European response to the scale of the terrorist threat we face."

Daniel Johnson said that Steyn is as "damning as he is persuasive: from demographic suicide to the abdication of self-defence, he conducts a forensic analysis of the hollowing out of the high culture for which the Continent was still respected a generation ago."

Canadian newspaper publisher and author, Conrad Black in his review of Steyn's follow-up book After America: Get Ready for Armageddon referred to America Alone as extolling "...America’s heroic status as the chief and only plausible resister to the degeneration of the West and the endless primitive depredations of militant Islam, carried out with the mischievous connivance of a greedy and malevolent China."

Fairness and Accuracy in Reporting criticized the book as "inarguably Islamophobic," and author Suhayl Saadi in the Independent referred to it as "hysterical".

In a March 2013 Ethnic and Racial Studies journal article, Nasar Meer wrote that the book was, "Remarkably similar to anxieties over western decline in the late 19th century."

The book has been considered to popularize the Eurabia theory of Bat Ye'or, whose work has been expressly cited by Steyn.

== Human rights complaints ==
In December 2007, Mohamed Elmasry of the Canadian Islamic Congress (CIC) filed Human rights complaints against Maclean's magazine with the Canadian Human Rights Commission, the British Columbia Human Rights Tribunal and the Ontario Human Rights Commission, accusing the magazine of publishing eighteen Islamophobic articles between January 2005 and July 2007. The articles in question included a column by Mark Steyn titled "The future belongs to Islam"—an excerpt from America Alone. The CIC said that Steyn's column was "flagrantly Islamophobic" and that it subjected Canadian Muslims to "hatred and contempt". The CIC's request for "equal space" to publish a response in Macleans was refused.

The CIC also filed a complaint with the Ontario Human Rights Commission. The Ontario Federation of Labour, with its 700,000 members, put pressure on all relevant parties, including Macleans' parent company, in support of the CIC complaint. The Ontario Human Rights Commission ruled that it did not have the jurisdiction to hear the complaint. The British Columbia Human Rights Tribunal heard the complaint in June 2008 and issued a ruling on October 10, 2008, dismissing the complaint. The Canadian Human Rights Commission dismissed the federal complaint on June 26, 2008, without referring the matter to a tribunal.

The case has been cited as a motivating factor in the repeal of Section 13 of the Canadian Human Rights Act.

== Halper and Clarke book ==
The title of Steyn's 2007 book echoes that of the best-selling Cambridge University Press scholarly 2005 publication by American Studies in the Department of Politics and International Studies' director, Stefan Halper, and Daniel Jonathan Clarke, America Alone: The Neo-Conservatives and the Global Order, which was also set in the context of the war on terror. Halper and Clarke trace the early rise to prominence and influence of a small group of "radical intellectuals," the neoconservatives. The authors described how the neoconservatives succeeded in changing the global order by gaining control over American national security policy during the war on terror. They persuaded US President George W. Bush to abandon the bipartisan diplomatic approach that had worked against the Soviet threat since the 1950s and to replace the consensus-driven approach with a neoconservative foreign policy, which promoted military confrontation and "nation-building."

== See also ==
- The West's Last Chance: Will We Win the Clash of Civilizations?
- We Are Doomed: Reclaiming Conservative Pessimism
- The Death of the West
- Eurabia
- Danish cartoon controversy
- Jack Straw
- Reflections on the Revolution in Europe
- Niall Ferguson
- Christopher Caldwell
- Londonistan: How Britain is Creating a Terror State Within
- While Europe Slept: How Radical Islam Is Destroying the West From Within
- Human rights complaints against Maclean's magazine
