= Section 13 of the Canadian Human Rights Act =

Repealed provision of Canadian human rights law

Section 13 of the Canadian Human Rights Act was a provision of the Canadian Human Rights Act dealing with hate messages. The provision prohibited online communications which were "likely to expose a person or persons to hatred or contempt" on the basis of a prohibited ground of discrimination (such as race, national or ethnic origin, colour, religion, etc.). Complaints under this section were brought to the Canadian Human Rights Commission and if the Commission found sufficient evidence, the case would be heard by the Canadian Human Rights Tribunal. Section 13 was repealed by the Parliament of Canada effective June 2014.

== Legislative history ==
The Canadian Human Rights Act was enacted in 1977, creating the Canadian Human Rights Commission that investigates claims of discrimination as well as the Canadian Human Rights Tribunal to judge the cases. Section 13 dealt with hate messages disseminated through federally regulated telecommunications. Parliament twice expanded the scope of section 13. In 1998, a penalty was added for breaches of the section. In 2001, the section was expanded to apply to telecommunications over the internet.

From 2001 until its repeal in 2014, the first part of section 13 read:

13. (1) It is a discriminatory practice for a person or a group of persons acting in concert to communicate telephonically or to cause to be so communicated, repeatedly, in whole or in part by means of the facilities of a telecommunication undertaking within the legislative authority of Parliament, any matter that is likely to expose a person or persons to hatred or contempt by reason of the fact that that person or those persons are identifiable on the basis of a prohibited ground of discrimination.

=== Suggestions for repeal or reform ===
In 2008, Liberal MP Keith Martin proposed private Member's motion M-446 urging Parliament to repeal section 13. Martin described the legal test of "likely to expose" as "a hole you could drive a Mack truck through," and said it is being applied by "rogue commissions where a small number of people [are] determining what Canadians can and can't say." Martin also asserted that some of history's most important ideas "were originally deemed to be sacrilegious and certainly in opposition to conventional wisdom. Who's to say that a commission cannot rule those ideas out of order and penalize people for saying or thinking them?"

Irwin Cotler, a Canadian human rights scholar and former minister of justice, (who has expressed support for prohibitions on the incitement of hate and genocide), floated (but did not endorse) the idea that section 13 cases should require the authorization of the Attorney-General, which is the requirement for criminal prosecutions for inciting violence or promoting hatred.

=== Repeal ===
On September 30, 2011, during the 41st Parliament, Conservative MP Brian Storseth introduced Private Member Bill C-304, titled An Act to amend the Canadian Human Rights Act (protecting freedom), which would repeal section 13. Bill C-304 received passed third reading in the House of Commons by 153–136 in a free vote on June 6, 2012. The bill received royal assent on June 26, 2013, coming into force one year later.

=== Bill C-36 ===
In 2019, the Parliament of Canada Standing Committee on Justice and Human Rights issued a report on ending online hate, which included recommending the reinstatement of section 13 or an analogous provision. Bill C-36 (43rd Parliament, 2nd session), introduced in 2021, would have reinstated section 13 in addition to adding a definition of hatred based on Supreme Court of Canada cases. The bill was still at first reading when Parliament was dissolved in 2021.

== Constitutional challenges ==
=== Canada (Human Rights Commission) v Taylor ===
In 1990, a 4-3 decision of the Supreme Court of Canada upheld the constitutionality of section 13(1). The majority found that the section did infringe freedom of expression under section 2 of the Canadian Charter of Rights and Freedoms, but that the prohibition on hate speech was a justifiable limitation under section 1 of the Charter.

=== Warman v. Lemire ===
In the 2009 case Warman v Lemire, the Canadian Human Rights Tribunal ruled that section 13 was an unconstitutional infringement of freedom of expression. The Tribunal distinguished the provision in place at that time from the earlier version the Supreme Court of Canada had ruled on, finding that amendments in the intervening years made the provision more penal in nature. Since the Tribunal did not have the authority to declare sections of the Canadian Human Rights Act invalid, it declined to apply section 13 in that case.

The Commission appealed the decision to the Federal Court of Appeal and in February 2014 the Federal Court of Appeal ruled section 13 to be constitutionally valid. The Court reinstated the penalty and the Tribunal's cease and desist order against Lemire for violating section 13.

== Section 13 cases ==
=== Canadian Islamic Congress and Maclean's ===
In December 2007, a group of Muslim law students and the Canadian Islamic Congress made complaints about hate speech against Maclean's magazine. The substance of the complaint was that a column by Mark Steyn, "The Future Belongs to Islam", exposed Muslims to hatred and contempt. Complaints were filed with the Canadian Human Rights Commission, the British Columbia Human Rights Tribunal and the Ontario Human Rights Commission. The Ontario Human Rights Commission ruled that it did not have the jurisdiction to hear the complaint. The Canadian Human Rights Commission dismissed the complaint on June 26, 2008. The British Columbia Human Rights Tribunal dismissed the complaint on October 10, 2008.

=== Imam Al-Hayiti ===
In December 2008, the Commission declined to investigate a complaint against Imam Abou Hammad Sulaiman al-Hayiti, a Montreal Salafist Muslim who was accused of inciting hatred against homosexuals, Western women, and Jews, in a book he published on the Internet. The National Post accused the Commission of selectively applying the Act to Christians and Conservatives, noting that it believes that Al-Hayiti should be allowed to promote any particular interpretation of Islam, or any other religion, but that the Human Rights Commissions practice a politically correct double standard. La Presse published an editorial criticizing the commission for its decision.

== Support and criticism ==
=== Criticism ===
Before its repeal, section 13 attracted criticism from those who viewed it as unwarranted infringement on freedom of expression.

- Alan Borovoy, general counsel for the Canadian Civil Liberties Association, noted that under section 13(1), "Intent is not a requirement, and truth and reasonable belief in the truth is no defence." He has said that when he and other human rights activists advocated the creation of human rights commissions they "never imagined that they might ultimately be used against freedom of speech."
- Mary Agnes Welch, president of the Canadian Association of Journalists stated that Human rights commissions "were never meant to act as language nannies. The current system allows complainants to chill the speech of those they disagree with by entangling targets in a human rights bureaucracy that doesn't have to operate under the same strict rules of defence as a court."
- Linguist and analytic philosopher Noam Chomsky said about the section, "I think it's outrageous, like the comparable European laws. It's also pure hypocrisy. If it were applied the media and journals would be shut down. They don't expose current enemies of the state to hatred or contempt?"

=== Support ===
Others defended section 13 as a reasonable limit on free expression, given the importance of regulating hate speech.

- Former justice minister and human rights advocate Irwin Cotler has advocated for legislation that would provide a civil (i.e. non-criminal) sanction for hate speech to protect vulnerable groups.
- In June 2008, human rights lawyer Pearl Eliadis responded to Alan Borovoy's concern that he never expected section 13 would be used against the free expression of opinion. Eliadis stated that it was always used, by definition, against hate speech, and that the understanding of the law had evolved from 40 years ago. Arguments against human rights commissions dealing with complaints against media are premised on the notion that "new rights are bad rights," because our understanding of equality law and international protections against hate speech had developed considerably. She added that the commissions are "strategically and uncomfortably poised" in "dynamic tension" among NGOs, government, voters, industry and other influences." Eliadis wrote an article in Maisonneuve where she argued that expressive behaviour has been the subject of human rights laws in since the 1940s and that critics were misleading the public about "the most basic aspects of Canadian law and human rights" and further stressed "the clear and present danger posed by discriminatory speech and the growth of e-hate." Eliadis subsequently published an extensive analysis in Canada in Speaking Out on Human Rights: Debating Canada's Human Rights System.
- Wahida Valiante, national vice-president of the Canadian Islamic Congress, stated that the commissions are the only recourse available to minorities treated unfairly in the media since membership in press councils is optional and criminal hate speech charges require the consent of the federal Attorney-General.
- In January 2010 the Canadian Bar Association released a statement which supported "retaining section 13 as a useful tool." However, it also called for the adoption of several recommendations for improving the Act "to ensure that the efficacy of this protection is not only enhanced but also accords with other fundamental human rights values," including the repealing of certain penalty provisions and "empowering the CHRC to dismiss at an early stage complaints that lack merit or have no reasonable chance for success."
- In April 2008, three senior officials of the Canadian Human Rights Commission granted a telephone interview with the media to respond to criticism, stating that the sort of prohibition embodied in section 13 is "actually the predominant view among most of the states of the world. The view in the United States [that the right to free speech is near-absolute] is really a minority view."
- In a September 2020 opinion piece in the Montreal Gazette, human rights activist and former CEO of the Simon Wiesenthal Center for Holocaust Studies, Avi Benlolo, called for the restoration of section 13 to deal with online hate.

=== Moon report ===
In 2008, University of Windsor law professor Richard Moon was commissioned by the Canadian Human Rights Commission to prepare a report on section 13. In November 2008, Moon released his report in which he recommended that section 13 should be repealed so that online hate speech is a purely criminal matter. Moon wrote that "The use of censorship by the government should be confined to a narrow category of extreme expression -- that which threatens, advocates or justifies violence against the members of an identifiable group." Moon argued that "it's not practical to deal with what one might generously describe as group defamation or stereotyping through censorship. It's just not a viable option. There's too much of it, and it's so pervasive within our public discourse that any kind of censorship is just overwhelming."

Jennifer Lynch, then chief commissioner of the Canadian Human Rights Commission, stated that Moon's report is "one step in a comprehensive review" and that "we can envision Section 13 being retained with some amendments." Lynch also stated that "our commission exists to protect Canadians from discrimination and I'm fervently going to uphold this core principle." She added that "we're going to strive to find more effective means to protect Canadians from exposure to hate on the Internet."

Keith Martin, the Liberal MP who first proposed scrapping section 13 earlier in 2008, called the recommendation "very courageous" and that "Now it's in Parliament's hands to do something to defend one of our true rights, freedom of speech."

Pearl Eliadis, a human rights lawyer, stated that Moon's statement that section 13 targets only extreme speech "makes explicit what the courts have already said implicitly." However, she opposed shifting the Canadian Human Rights Commission's role to focus solely on violence as opposed to hatred. Eliadis argued that "when we deal with genocide and ethnic cleansing cases in other countries, what does the international community say over and over again? We need a warning system. And one of the warnings is incitement to hatred." However, she wrote that criminal law powers should be used with care, and that the provisions in human rights legislation offer a less drastic option than criminal investigations into hate speech in some circumstances.Speaking Out on Human Rights: Debating Canada's Human Rights System.

== See also ==
- Human rights complaints against Maclean's magazine
- Ezra Levant human rights complaint
- Censorship in Canada
- Canadian Human Rights Tribunal
- Ontario Human Rights Commission
- Human rights in Canada
- Freedom of expression in Canada
