= After America (Steyn book) =

Non-fiction book published in the U.S.

- First edition
- Author: Mark Steyn
- Language: English
- Subject: History of the U.S. Conservatism in the U.S. Modern liberalism in the U.S. U.S. national debt U.S. spending policies
- Published: 2011
- Publisher: Regnery Publishing

After America: Get Ready for Armageddon is a non-fiction book authored by socio-political commentator Mark Steyn, being published in 2011 by Regnery. In the work, he asserts that the United States has placed itself onto a trajectory towards decline and eventual collapse due to different trends in its history, a path that he states has been set out previously by other nations of the Western world. The author specifically cites what he sees as unsustainable national spending and borrowing, with the U.S. national debt causing multiple negative effects across the country in his view.

In summary, Steyn declares explicitly, "They have our soul who have our bonds." In background terms, After America functions as both a sequel and somewhat of a repudiation of Steyn's previous book. Titled America Alone, said earlier work had forecast widespread international decline while also pointedly arguing that the U.S. existed in a unique situation due to superior ideological policies and values.

Although written in a polemical style about controversial issues, After America has attracted support from publications such as The Spectator and The Washington Times. It peaked at number four on the New York Times non-fiction bestseller list.

== Background and contents ==
The book serves as both a sequel and somewhat of a repudiation of America Alone, which Steyn had recently written beforehand. While the earlier work declared that widespread international failings were imminent, it additionally set the U.S. aside. The country, in Steyn's opinion, had possessed a unique situation due to its featuring of superior ideological policies and values.

Although explicitly forecasting despair and destruction, labeling the "impending collapse" in America about to occur "supersized", Steyn asserts that like many doomsayers he genuinely hopes for and seeks to work for a better future. The core argument of the book centers around the U.S. federal government and its large-scale accumulation of debt. Through Steyn's eyes, the U.S. fiscal situation represents not only an ethic failing but a fundamentally dangerous strategic weakness. He bluntly writes that a future Chinese takeover of the disputed territory of Taiwan will only have come upon because "suburban families in Albuquerque and small businesses in Pocatello will have paid for it.”

Although highly critical of then President Barack Obama and the deficit-related policies of Obama's administration, Steyn condemns past occupants of the White House regardless of political party for what he sees as a recklessness and lack of foresight. The creation of "a near perfect straight line across four decades, up, up, up" in terms of government spending horrifies Steyn. More broadly, he criticizes the "cheap service economy" established by a set of U.S. policies that entail "increasing dependency" and the "disincentivizing [of] self-reliance". While hostile to the cultural trends created by modern social liberalism, he views the core issue as that of state control of and growing politicization of what used to be considered regular life.

Should the role of government continue to expand in regular peoples' lives and the expansion of debt go on, Steyn's ultimate worries are apocalyptic, with him declaring,

"There will be no ‘new world order’, only a world without order, in which pipsqueak failed states go nuclear while the planet’s wealthiest nations are unable to defend their borders and are forced to adjust to the post-American era as they can."

== Reviews and response ==
Although written in a polemical style about controversial issues, After America attracted support from publications such as The Washington Times, where Steyn received comparison to George Orwell, and The Spectator, where Steyn's sense of prose received comparison to pyrotechnics. It peaked at number four on the New York Times non-fiction bestseller list, tagged with a dagger for bulk orders.

On August 17, 2011, Steyn discussed the book and a variety of related topics while delivering the first lecture in The NHIOP Bookmark Series, a program of the New Hampshire Institute of Politics at Saint Anselm College in Manchester, New Hampshire. C-SPAN recorded Steyn's comments.

== See also ==
- America Alone
- The Death of the West
- U.S. government spending
- U.S. national debt
- We Are Doomed
