= Mark Steyn =

Canadian writer (born 1959)

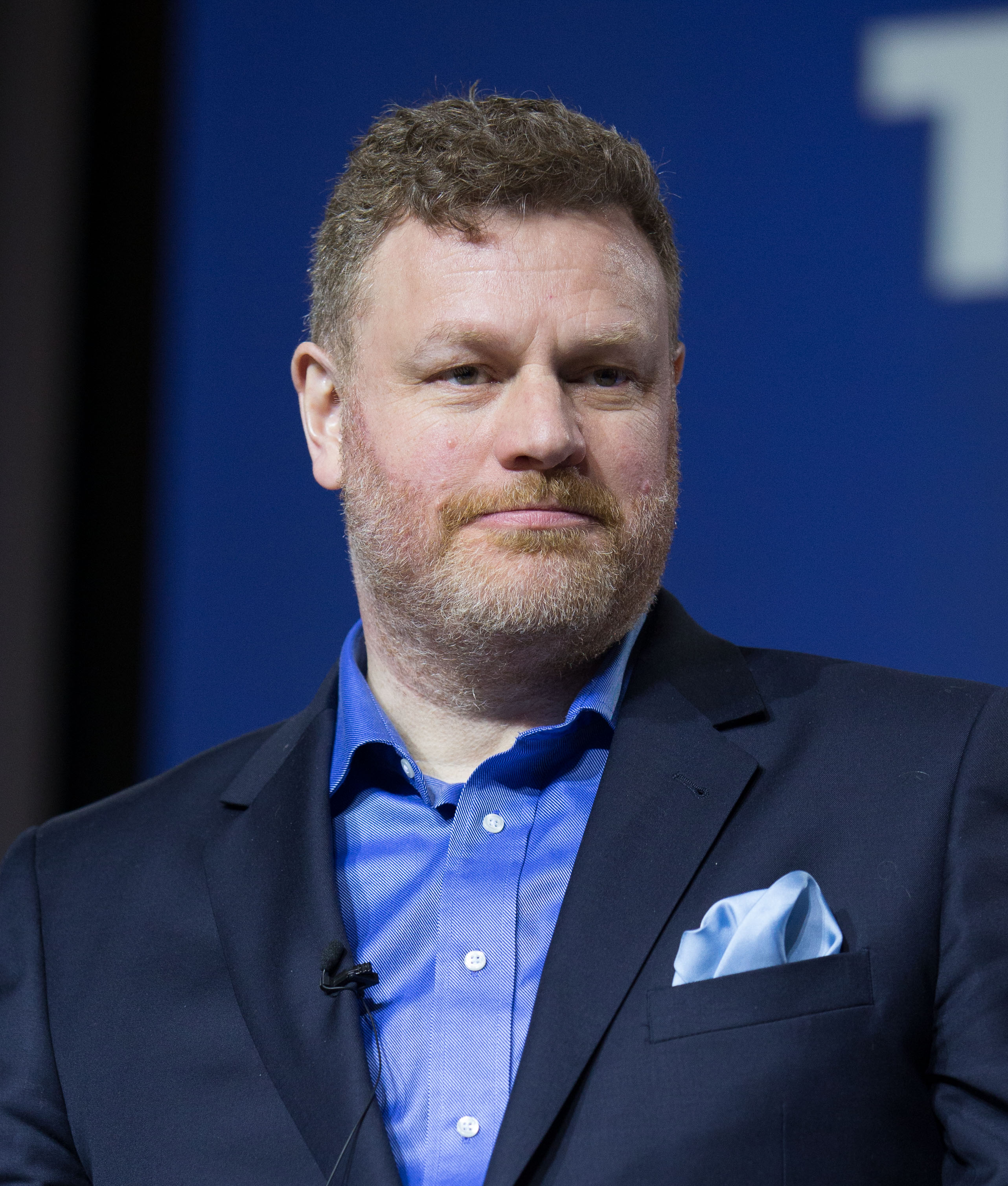
- Steyn in 2014
- Born: 1959 (age 66–67)
- Occupations: Author, commentator
- Children: 3
- Relatives: Stella Steyn (great-aunt)
- Website: steynonline.com

Mark Steyn (/staɪn/) (born 1959) is a Canadian author and a radio, television, and on-line presenter. He has written several books, including The New York Times bestsellers America Alone, After America, and Broadway Babies Say Goodnight. In the US he has guest-hosted the nationally syndicated Rush Limbaugh Show, as well as Tucker Carlson Tonight on Fox News, on which he regularly appeared as a guest and fill-in host.

In 2021, Steyn began hosting his own show on British news channel GB News. He left GB News in early February 2023, saying that the channel wanted him to pay fines issued by the UK media regulator Ofcom, which was investigating complaints of COVID-19 vaccination scepticism aired on The Mark Steyn Show. He has since moved his show to his own website.

== Early life ==
Steyn was baptized a Catholic and was later confirmed in the Anglican Church, which he left to become a Baptist. He has stated that "the last Jewish female in my line was one of my paternal great-grandmothers" and that "both my grandmothers were Catholic". His parents were married in Elliot Lake, Ontario. Steyn's great-aunt was artist Stella Steyn. His mother's family was Belgian.

Steyn was educated at King Edward's School, Birmingham, in the United Kingdom, the same school that author J.R.R. Tolkien attended and where Steyn was assigned a Greek dictionary that had also been used by Tolkien. Although it was reported by The Age in 2006 that Steyn had left school at age 16, his name appears in the King Edward's School yearbook for 1977-78 as a member of "Cl.VI", that is, the "Classics [Upper] 6th form", which is the normal final year for students at that school.

== Career ==
Steyn worked as a disc jockey before becoming musical theatre critic at the newly established The Independent in 1986. He acted as TV critic for Channel 4's breakfast show The Channel 4 Daily and was appointed film critic for The Spectator in 1992. After writing predominantly about the arts, Steyn shifted his focus to political commentary and wrote a column for The Daily Telegraph, a conservative broadsheet, until 2006.

He has written for many publications, including The Washington Post, The Jerusalem Post, Orange County Register, Chicago Sun-Times, National Review, The New York Sun, The Australian, Maclean's, The Irish Times, National Post, The Atlantic, Western Standard, and The New Criterion. He subsequently stepped back from writing and now devotes most of his time to his show.

Steyn's books include Broadway Babies Say Goodnight: Musicals Then and Now, a history of the musical theatre, and the political America Alone: The End of the World as We Know It, a New York Times bestseller which predicts the downfall of the West. He has also published collections of his columns and celebrity obituaries, as well as profiles from The Atlantic.

Steyn held a Eugene C. Pulliam Visiting Fellowship in Journalism at Hillsdale College in spring 2013. As of 2010, Steyn was no longer the back-page columnist for the print edition of National Review, conservative writer James Lileks having taken over that space. Steyn's back-page column for National Review, "Happy Warriors", resumed with the issue of March 21, 2011.

Steyn has contributed to the blog Ricochet.com and recorded numerous podcasts with the organization.

From December 2016 to February 2017, Steyn hosted The Mark Steyn Show on the CRTV Digital Network. CRTV abruptly cancelled the show after two months and went to arbitration, with both sides claiming breach of contract. Steyn also sued to keep the show on the air during arbitration, saying it was on behalf of his employees. Former show supervisor Mike Young called this "bullshit" when quoted in The Daily Beast. Former employees provided sworn declarations that Steyn was "incredibly disorganised", tyrannical, and impossible to work with. Steyn was awarded damages for breach of contract, which was confirmed on appeal, as well as attorneys' fees.

In October 2021, Steyn began covering for Nigel Farage on his prime time show Farage on GB News on Fridays and was a relief presenter for Farage on other days. On November 19, 2021, Steyn received a permanent prime time host billing on GB News, with the Friday show renamed Mark Steyn. In January 2022, the show began airing five nights a week, Monday to Friday, which in February was reduced to Monday to Thursday. In March 2022, during the Russian invasion of Ukraine, Steyn presented the show from Western Ukraine.

In December 2022, Steyn suffered a heart attack while broadcasting the Mark Steyn Show on GB News TV. He did not recognise the symptoms as a heart attack, but later suffered a second, while in France, where he was hospitalised.

Steyn quit GB News in February 2023, in protest at the channel wanting to change his contract to make him personally liable for any fines issued by the UK's media regulator Ofcom, which was then investigating 411 complaints from viewers about Covid vaccine scepticism aired on Steyn's show, in potential breach of the Broadcasting Code. Steyn also complained changes in his contract would force him and his staff to attend regulatory compliance training sessions, which he referred to as "re-education classes".

On 6 March 2023, Steyn was found by Ofcom to have breached its rules during a GB News programme about COVID-19 vaccines. Ofcom said the Steyn programme had "presented a materially misleading interpretation of official data without sufficient challenge or counterweight".

== Positions ==
=== Criticism of the news media ===
In a May 2004 column, Steyn commented that editors were encouraging anti-Bush sentiments after the Daily Mirror and The Boston Globe had published faked pictures, which originated on American and Hungarian pornographic Web sites, of British and American soldiers supposedly sexually abusing Iraqis. Steyn argued that the media only wanted to show images to Westerners "that will shame and demoralize them."

In a July 2005 column for National Review, Steyn criticized Andrew Jaspan, then the editor of The Age, an Australian newspaper. Jaspan was offended by Douglas Wood, an Australian kidnapped and held hostage in Iraq, who after his rescue referred to his captors as "arseholes." Jaspan claimed that "the issue is really largely, speaking as I understand it, he was treated well there. He says he was fed every day, and as such to turn around and use that kind of language I think is just insensitive." Steyn argued that there is nothing at all wrong with insensitivity toward murderous captors, and that it was Jaspan, not Wood, who suffered from Stockholm syndrome. He said further, "A blindfolded Mr. Wood had to listen to his captors murder two of his colleagues a few inches away, but how crude and boorish would one have to be to hold that against one's hosts?"

=== Conrad Black trial ===
Steyn wrote articles and maintained a blog for Maclean's covering the 2007 business fraud trial of his financial patron Conrad Black in Chicago, from the point of view of one who was adamantly convinced Black never committed any crime. Doing this, he later wrote, "cost me my gig at the [Chicago] Sun-Times" and "took me away from more lucrative duties such as book promotion". Steyn expressed dismay at "the procedural advantages the prosecution enjoys—the inducements it's able to dangle in order to turn witnesses that, if offered by the defence, would be regarded as the suborning of perjury; or the confiscation of assets intended to prevent an accused person from being able to mount a defence; or the piling on of multiple charges which virtually guarantees that a jury will seek to demonstrate its balanced judgment by convicting on something. All that speaks very poorly for the federal justice system."

After Black's conviction, Steyn published a long essay in Maclean's about the case, strongly criticizing Black's defense team.

=== Muslim immigration views ===
Steyn opposes Muslim immigration to the United States, which he describes as dangerous. According to Steyn, the West faces a choice "between liberty and mass Muslim immigration."

Steyn believes that if mass Muslim migration to Europe is not stopped, Europe will turn into what he calls "Eurabia", a future society where the European continent will be dominated by Islam. He has written: "much of what we loosely call the Western world will not survive this century, and much of it will effectively disappear in our lifetimes, including many, if not most Western European countries."

In his book America Alone, Steyn likened Europe to Bosnia in the lead-up to its civil war and genocide:

Why did Bosnia collapse into the worst slaughter in Europe since the second World War? In the thirty years before the meltdown, Bosnian Serbs had declined from 43 percent to 31 percent of the population, while Bosnian Muslims had increased from 26 percent to 44 percent. In a democratic age, you can't buck demography—except through civil war. The Serbs figured that out, as other Continentals will in the years ahead: if you cannot outbreed the enemy, cull 'em. The problem that Europe faces is that Bosnia's demographic profile is now the model for the entire continent. (Note: For full and proper context and information on demographic dynamics in Bosnia since 1945 see notes on Demographic history of Bosnia; on history and demographic history of Bosnia, see Bosniaks, History of Bosnia and Herzegovina and Demographic history of Bosnia and Herzegovina; for context and causes of the war and genocide see Bosnian War and Bosnian genocide.)

When some critics claimed that Steyn was advocating genocide in this passage, he wrote:

My book isn't about what I want to happen but what I think will happen. Given Fascism, Communism and ethnic cleansing in the Balkans, it's not hard to foresee that the neo-nationalist resurgence already under way in parts of Europe will at some point take a violent form. ... I think any descent into neo-fascism will be ineffectual and therefore merely a temporary blip in the remorseless transformation of the Continent.

Steyn has written about Muslim demographic projections to back up Bat Ye'or's Eurabia theory and has been on the board of advisors of the International Free Press Society, both key components of the international counter-jihad movement. In 2012, he also participated in the international counter-jihad conference in Brussels, billed as the "International Conference for Free Speech & Human Rights".

=== Support of the invasion of Iraq ===
Steyn was an early proponent of the 2003 invasion of Iraq. In 2013, Steyn blamed the United States' lack of success in Iraq on poor communication. Conor Friedersdorf, responding in a column for The Atlantic, noted that Steyn had declared victory in Iraq in 2004, incorrectly stating that the US had left the country at that time.

== Books ==
=== The Story of Miss Saigon ===
In one of his first books, The Story of Miss Saigon (1991) co-written with Edward Behr, Steyn offered up his stance on the Miss Saigon controversy of 1990. Steyn accused the Asian-American activists opposed to the musical Miss Saigon of a "new tribalism" that threatened to bring in "a new era of conformity and sanctimoniousness".

=== America Alone ===
Steyn's work America Alone: The End of the World as We Know It is a New York Times bestselling nonfiction book published in 2006. It deals with the global war on terror and wider issues of demographics in Muslim and non-Muslim populations. It was recommended by George W. Bush. The paperback edition, released in April 2008 with a new introduction, was labeled "Soon to Be Banned in Canada", alluding to a possible result that Steyn then anticipated from the Canadian Islamic Congress' human rights complaints against Maclean's magazine.

In an essay about America Alone, Christopher Hitchens wrote that "Mark Steyn believes that demography is destiny, and he makes an immensely convincing case," then detailed many points at which he disagreed with Steyn. Hitchens believed Steyn erred by "considering European Muslim populations as one. Islam is as fissile as any other religion, and considerable friction exists among immigrant Muslim groups in many European countries. Moreover, many Muslims actually have come to Europe for the advertised purposes; seeking asylum and to build a better life." Nevertheless, Hitchens expressed strong agreement with some of Steyn's points, calling the book "admirably tough-minded."

=== After America ===
In 2011, Steyn published After America: Get Ready for Armageddon, a follow-up to America Alone. In it, he argues that the U.S. is now on the same trajectory towards decline and fall as the rest of the West due to unsustainable national spending and the subsequent borrowing involved to pay for expanding government. Within its pages, After America discusses the U.S. federal debt specifically and more generally the rise of bureaucratic state control as individual initiative declines.

Should decline continue to affect peoples' lives and the expansion of debt go on, Steyn's ultimate worries are apocalyptic, with him declaring,

There will be no 'new world order', only a world without order, in which pipsqueak failed states go nuclear while the planet's wealthiest nations are unable to defend their borders and are forced to adjust to the post-American era as they can.

After America peaked at number four on the New York Times bestseller list for non-fiction, but tagged with a dagger for bulk orders. Although written in a polemical style about controversial issues, praise came from publications such as The Washington Times, where Steyn received comparison to George Orwell, and The Spectator, where Steyn's sense of prose received comparison to pyrotechnics.

On August 17, 2011, Steyn discussed the book and a variety of related issues while delivering the first lecture in The NHIOP Bookmark Series, a program of the New Hampshire Institute of Politics at Saint Anselm College in Manchester, New Hampshire. C-SPAN recorded Steyn's comments.

== Legal issues ==
=== Canadian Islamic Congress human rights complaint ===
In 2007, a complaint was filed with the Ontario Human Rights Commission related to Steyn's article, entitled "The Future Belongs to Islam", published in Maclean's magazine. The complainants alleged that the article and the refusal of Maclean's to provide space for a rebuttal violated their human rights. The complainants also claimed that the article was one of twenty-two (22) Maclean's articles, many written by Steyn, about Muslims. Further complaints were filed with the Canadian Human Rights Commission, later stripped of its mandate by the Canadian parliament in 2011, and the British Columbia Human Rights Tribunal.

The Ontario Human Rights Commission refused in April 2008 to proceed, saying it lacked jurisdiction to deal with magazine content. However, the Commission stated that it "strongly condemns the Islamophobic portrayal of Muslims ... Media has a responsibility to engage in fair and unbiased journalism." Critics of the Commission claimed that Maclean's and Steyn had been found guilty without a hearing. John Martin of The Province wrote, "There was no hearing, no evidence presented and no opportunity to offer a defence—just a pronouncement of wrongdoing."

The OHRC defended its right to comment by stating, "Like racial profiling and other types of discrimination, ascribing the behaviour of individuals to a group damages everyone in that group. We have always spoken out on such issues. Maclean's and its writers are free to express their opinions. The OHRC is mandated to express what it sees as unfair and harmful comment or conduct that may lead to discrimination."

Steyn subsequently criticized the Commission, commenting that "Even though they (the OHRC) don't have the guts to hear the case, they might as well find us guilty. Ingenious!"

Soon afterwards, the head of the Canadian Human Rights Commission issued a public letter to the editor of Maclean's magazine. In it, Jennifer Lynch said, "Mr. Steyn would have us believe that words, however hateful, should be given free reign [sic]. History has shown us that hateful words sometimes lead to hurtful actions that undermine freedom and have led to unspeakable crimes. That is why Canada and most other democracies have enacted legislation to place reasonable limits on the expression of hatred." The National Post subsequently defended Steyn and sharply criticized Lynch, stating that Lynch has "no clear understanding of free speech or the value of protecting it" and that "No human right is more basic than freedom of expression, not even the "right" to live one's life free from offence by remarks about one's ethnicity, gender, culture or orientation."

The federal Canadian Human Rights Commission dismissed the Canadian Islamic Congress' complaint against Maclean's in June 2008. The CHRC's ruling said of the article that, "the writing is polemical, colourful and emphatic, and was obviously calculated to excite discussion and even offend certain readers, Muslim and non-Muslim alike." However, the Commission ruled that overall, "the views expressed in the Steyn article, when considered as a whole and in context, are not of an extreme nature, as defined by the Supreme Court."

Steyn later wrote a lengthy reflection of his turmoil with the commissions and the tribunals. The reflection appears as the introduction to The Tyranny of Nice, a book authored by Kathy Shaidle and Pete Vere on Canada's human rights commissions.

=== Defamation lawsuit ===
In February 2024, a civil trial jury in Washington found that Mark Steyn and Competitive Enterprise Institute (CEI) blogger Rand Simberg defamed and injured climatologist Michael E. Mann in blog posts. The jury awarded Mann $1 in compensatory damages from each writer. It awarded punitive damages of $1,000 from Simberg and $1 million from Steyn, after finding that the pair made their statements with "maliciousness, spite, ill will, vengeance or deliberate intent to harm." In 2025 the D.C. Superior court reduced the Steyn punitive damages payment to $5000, based in part on the discrepancy with the compensatory damages.

Mann also sued the National Review and Competitive Enterprise Institute, which had published Steyn and Simberg's blog posts. In 2021 these two defendants were held not liable for defamation, and Mann was later ordered to pay $530,000 in legal expenses to the National Review.

The defamatory statements were from 2012, when Simberg accused American climatologist Mann of "deception" and "engaging in data manipulation" and alleged that the Penn State investigation that had cleared Mann was a "cover-up and whitewash" comparable to the recent Jerry Sandusky sex scandal, "except that instead of molesting children, he has molested and tortured data." The CEI blog editor then removed the sentence as "inappropriate", but a National Review blog post by Steyn cited it and alleged that Mann's hockey stick graph was "fraudulent".

Mann asked CEI and National Review to remove the allegations and apologize, or he would take action. The CEI published further insults, and National Review Editor Rich Lowry responded in an article headed "Get Lost" with a declaration that, should Mann sue, the discovery process would be used to reveal and publish Mann's emails. Mann's lawyer filed the defamation lawsuit in October 2012.

Before the case could go to discovery, CEI and National Review filed a court motion to dismiss it under anti-SLAPP legislation, with the claim that they had merely been using exaggerated language which was acceptable against a public figure. In July 2013, the judge ruled against this motion, and when the defendants took this to appeal a new judge also denied their motion to dismiss, in January 2014. National Review changed its lawyers, and Steyn decided to represent himself in court. Journalist Seth Shulman, at the Union of Concerned Scientists, welcomed the judge's statement that accusations of fraud "go to the heart of scientific integrity. They can be proven true or false. If false, they are defamatory. If made with actual malice, they are actionable."

The defendants again appealed against the decision, and on August 11, 2014, the Reporters Committee for Freedom of the Press with 26 other organizations, including the ACLU, Bloomberg, Gannett (USA Today), Comcast (NBCUniversal), Time, Fox News and The Seattle Times Company, filed an amicus brief arguing that the comments at issue were constitutionally protected as opinion. Steyn chose to be represented by attorney Daniel J. Kornstein.

An appeal to have the lawsuit thrown out, filed by Steyn's co-defendants (National Review, CEI and Simberg), was heard in the D.C. Court of Appeals on November 25, 2014. Steyn was present for oral arguments but did not join the appeal, preferring to go to trial. On December 22, 2016, the D.C. appeals court ruled that Mann's case against Simberg and Steyn could go ahead. A "reasonable jury" could find against the defendants, and though the context should be considered, "if the statements assert or imply false facts that defame the individual, they do not find shelter under the First Amendment simply because they are embedded in a larger policy debate.". A counterclaim Steyn filed through his attorneys on March 17, 2014, was dismissed with prejudice by the D.C. court on August 29, 2019, leaving Steyn to pay litigation costs.

The defendants filed for certiorari with the U.S. Supreme Court in the hope it would hear their appeal. On November 25, 2019, it denied the petition without comment. In a dissenting opinion, associate justice Samuel Alito wrote that he had favored hearing the case on the basis that, even though the defendants might yet prevail in the case or the outcome itself come before the Court for review, the expense of litigating the case this far may itself have a chilling effect which would deter speakers. Mann said that he looked forward to the trial.

On February 8, 2024, after a jury trial in the Superior Court of the District of Columbia, each of the co-defendants Simberg and Steyn was ordered to pay Mann $1 in compensatory damages. Mann was awarded $1,000 in punitive damages from Simberg and $1 million from Steyn. Steyn, who had self-represented, said through his manager he would be appealing the punitive damages, as did Simberg, through his lawyer.

Regarding the one dollar compensatory damage award, Steyn indicated it vindicated his belief that Mann never suffered any actual injury. The two writers had argued during the trial that Mann become famous in the years after their remarks.

In 2025 a D.C. Superior Court judge reduced the Steyn punitive damages payment to $5000. Law commentator Eugene Volokh wrote that the court did not disagree with the jury verdict that Steyn had libeled Mann through reckless and knowingly false statements. The court based the new figure on precedents and the actual damages to Mann.

== Critical reception ==
Steyn's writing has drawn supporters and detractors for both content and style. Martin Amis, who was harshly criticized in America Alone but gave it a positive review, said of the style: "Mark Steyn is an oddity: his thoughts and themes are sane and serious—but he writes like a maniac." His style was described by Robert Fulford as "bring[ing] to public affairs the dark comedy developed in the Theatre of the Absurd." Longtime editor and admirer Fulford also wrote, "Steyn, a self-styled 'right-wing bastard,' violates everyone's sense of good taste." According to Simon Mann, Steyn "gives succour to the maxim the pen is mightier than the sword, though he is not averse to employing the former to advocate use of the latter." Dan Kennedy, professor of journalism at North Eastern University, has described Steyn's journalistic technique as "write, twist, smear and sneer, repeat!" Charlie Pierce told the Boston Phoenix in 2004 that "If a guy who is that nakedly, intellectually dishonest can become a successful conservative writer, then conservative intellectualism is dead in this country. If it began with Buckley and the people who taught him, it ends with the likes of Mark Steyn."

Susan Catto in Time believed Steyn had an interest in controversy: "Instead of shying away from the appearance of conflict, Steyn positively revels in it." Canadian journalist Steve Burgess wrote: "Steyn wields his rhetorical rapier with genuine skill" and that national disasters tended to cause Steyn "to display his inner wingnut."

In 2009, Canadian journalist Paul Wells accused Steyn of dramatically exaggerating the rise of fascist political parties in Europe. Wells also accused Steyn of repeatedly "shrieking" about Islam in his political writings.

=== Awards ===
Steyn was awarded the 2006 Eric Breindel Award for Excellence in Opinion Journalism for writing which "best reflects love of this country and its democratic institutions".

Steyn has also received awards from the Claremont Institute in 2005, the Center for Security Policy in 2007, the International Free Press Society in 2010, and the Justice Centre for Constitutional Freedoms in 2018.

== Personal life ==
Steyn lives and works mainly in Woodsville, New Hampshire, U.S. He has three children.

== Bibliography ==
- The Story of Miss Saigon (by Edward Behr and Steyn; 1991, ISBN 1-55970-124-2)
- Broadway Babies Say Goodnight: Musicals Then and Now (1997, ISBN 0-415-92286-0)
- The Face of the Tiger (2002, ISBN 0-9731570-0-3; collected columns)
- Mark Steyn From Head To Toe: An Anatomical Anthology (2004, ISBN 0-9731570-2-X; collected columns)
- America Alone: The End of the World as We Know It (2006, ISBN 0-89526-078-6)
- Mark Steyn's Passing Parade (2006, ISBN 0-9731570-1-1; collected obituaries)
- The Tyranny of Nice (2008, ISBN 978-0-9780490-1-0; introduction)
- A Song for the Season (2008, A Musical Calendar)
- Lights Out: Islam, Free Speech And The Twilight Of The West (2009) ISBN 0-9731570-5-4
- After America: Get Ready for Armageddon (2011) ISBN 1-59698-100-8
- The Undocumented Mark Steyn: Don't Say You Weren't Warned (2014) ISBN 1-62157-318-4
- Climate Change: The Facts (2015) ISBN 0-98639-830-6
- "A Disgrace To The Profession" ~ The World's Scientists, In Their Own Words, On Michael E Mann, His Hockey Stick And Their Damage To Science ~ Volume I (2015) ISBN 978-0986398339
- The Prisoner of Windsor ~ an audiobook, is a sequel and an inversion of the novel "A Prisoner of Zenda" by Anthony Hope.

== See also ==
- Defamation lawsuit against Steyn by Michael E. Mann
- Conservatism in Canada
- Culture war
- List of newspaper columnists
