= After America =

After America may refer to:

- After America (Birmingham book), a 2010 alternate history novel by John Birmingham
- After America (Steyn book), a 2011 non-fiction book by Mark Steyn
- After America (film), a 2021 American drama film
