= Alan Borovoy =

Canadian lawyer and human rights activist

- Born: Alfred Alan Borovoy; March 17, 1932; Hamilton, Ontario, Canada
- Died: May 11, 2015 (aged 83); Toronto, Ontario, Canada
- Education: University of Toronto
- Occupation: Lawyer
- Known for: General counsel of the Canadian Civil Liberties Association
- Term: 1968-2009
- Awards: Officer of the Order of Canada

Alfred Alan Borovoy, OC (March 17, 1932 – May 11, 2015) was a Canadian lawyer and human rights activist best known as the longtime general counsel of the Canadian Civil Liberties Association (CCLA).

Born in Hamilton, Ontario, Borovoy's family owned a drug store that went out of business during the Great Depression, forcing the family to move in with Borovoy's grandparents who lived on Grace Street, then a working-class neighbourhood in Toronto's west end.

He was raised as a child in the 1930s and '40s in Toronto where anti-Semitism was commonplace. Borovoy was on the community relations committee of the Canadian Jewish Congress from 1951 until 2011. His activities in 1963 resulted to the formation of Halifax Advisory Committee on Human Rights, where he continued his fight against racial discrimination.

Attending the University of Toronto, he received a Bachelor of Arts from University College in 1953 and a Bachelor of Laws in 1956. He has been awarded four honorary doctorates. He was admitted to the Ontario Bar in 1958. In 1960, Borovoy started working as secretary of the Jewish Labour Committee in Toronto, fighting racism against minority groups in Toronto, particularly Black Canadians. He was also active with organizations such as the National Committee for Human Rights of the Canadian Labour Congress, the Ontario Labour Committee for Human Rights, and the Toronto & District Labour Committee for Human Rights. In the 1963 Ontario provincial election, Borovoy was the New Democratic Party of Ontario's candidate in the Toronto riding of Downsview, coming in second with 35% of the vote.

In 1968, Borovoy became General Counsel for the CCLA, a position he held until his retirement on 1 July 2009. He then became CCLA's General Counsel Emeritus. During his tenure he was one of the main advocates for the development of the Canadian Human Rights Commission and the Ontario Human Rights Commission, both of which ensure delivery of services and accommodation free from discrimination. Borovoy later believed that "extremists among equality seekers" are dangerous to liberal values by using hate speech laws and human rights commissions to censor their adversaries.

Borovoy was a visiting professor at Dalhousie University's law school and the University of Windsor's law school and also lectured part-time at the University of Toronto's Faculty of Social Work and York University's political science department.

When Israel Apartheid Week advocates complained in 2009 about the administration at Carleton University removing their posters, Borovoy defended the activists. "We are talking about the right to castigate the behaviour of ... foreign governments," he said at the time. "Universities are supposed to be a storm centre of controversy and debate."

He was the author of The New Anti-Liberals, Uncivil Obedience: The Tactics and Tales of a Democratic Agitator and When Freedoms Collide: The Case for Our Civil Liberties, which was nominated for the 1988 Governor General's Awards. His book, Categorically Incorrect: Ethical fallacies in Canada's war on terror was released in early 2007.

Borovoy wrote a biweekly column for the Toronto Star from 1992 to 1996.

The publication of his memoir At the Barricades came in 2014. Therein, Borovoy describes his 'pragmatic' view of human nature, the inevitability of conflict in making progressive social change, and the sacrifices he made for career over family. "I was a social democrat, a civil libertarian, a secular Jew, and a philosophical pragmatist," Borovoy wrote, a skeptical egalitarian, but "an unequivocal anti-Communist and perhaps even a Cold War hawk."

In 1982, he was made an Officer of the Order of Canada. He died in 2015.
