= Renu Mandhane =

Canadian lawyer

Renu Mandhane (born 1977) is a Canadian judge and former lawyer who was appointed to the Ontario Superior Court of Justice (Brampton) on May 22, 2020.

== Early life and education ==
Mandhane was born and grew up in Calgary, Alberta, Canada. Her parents, Jaman and Nilima Mandhane (an engineer and bookkeeper, respectively), immigrated to Canada from India in the early 1970s. She has one brother, Dr. Piush Mandhane, who is an associate professor of medicine at the University of Alberta.

Mandhane earned a Bachelor of Arts (with distinction) from Queen's University in Kingston, Ontario in 1998. She then graduated with a Juris Doctor from the University of Toronto Faculty of Law in 2001, and a LL.M in international human rights law from New York University School of Law in 2003.

Mandhane has authored the following academic articles:

- "Ending impunity: critical reflections on the prosecutions of heads of state" (2011) 61 University of Toronto Law Journal 163
- Paul Michell & Renu Mandhane, "New standards of independence and impartiality for the expert witness" (2005) 42(3) Alberta Law Review 636
- "The use of human rights discourse to secure women’s interests: critical analysis of the implications" (2004) 10(2) Michigan Journal of Gender & Law 275
- "Efficiency or autonomy? Economic and feminist legal theory in the context of sexual assault" (2001) 59 University of Toronto Faculty of Law Review 173
- "Duty to rescue through the lens of multiple-party sexual assault" (2000) 9 Dalhousie Journal of Legal Studies 1

== Early legal career ==
Mandhane was a member of the Law Society of Ontario from 2002 until her appointment to the bench in 2020.

Mandhane completed her articles at a leading full-service law firm in Toronto, Torys LLP, and then practiced criminal law with Diane Oleskiw, now Justice Oleskiw of the Ontario Court of Justice. Mandhane was counsel to criminally-accused persons and prisoners before trial and appeal courts, and administrative tribunals. She represented women and children as complainants in sexual assault matters. Mandhane's notable cases include:

- Dodd v. Canada (Correctional Services of Canada), [2007] 85 OR (3d) 346 (C.A.); and
- R. v. Truscott, (2006) 83 O.R. (3d) 272 (C.A.).

== University of Toronto, Faculty of Law ==
From 2009-2015, Mandhane was Director of the University of Toronto's International Human Rights Program. Mandhane accepted the Ludwig and Estelle Jus Memorial Human Rights Prize and the Lexpert Zenith Award for Pro Bono Service on behalf of the International Human Rights Program. Mandhane was counsel on interventions before the Supreme Court of Canada related to the domestic application of international law, including:

- Chevron Corp. v. Yaiguaje, [2015] 3 SCR 69; and
- Ezokola v. Canada (Citizenship and Immigration), [2013] 2 SCR 678.

Mandhane worked closely with PEN International to highlight threats to freedom of expression in Mexico and India. Mandhane is also noted for exposing Canada’s treatment of immigration detainees with mental health disabilities who are held indefinitely in provincial jails pending deportation. Throughout her tenure at the University of Toronto, Mandhane was involved with national law reform efforts to impose strict prohibitions and judicial oversight of solitary confinement in Canada's prisons and jails. In 2015, Mandhane appeared before the United Nations Human Rights Committee (Geneva) on Canada's periodic review under the International Covenant on Civil and Political Rights.

== Ontario Human Rights Commission ==
In 2015, Mandhane was appointed chief commissioner for the Ontario Human Rights Commission, and served in that role until she was appointed to the bench in 2020. During Mandhane's tenure, the commission enacted policies on racial profiling, accessible education, and religious freedom. Mandhane conducted public inquires that showed the over-representation of Black people in violent police interactions, the over-representation of Black and Indigenous children in state care, and the barriers to accommodation of students with learning disabilities in public schools. As a result of her leadership, Ontario passed legislation to better protect human rights in policing and corrections, and to advance anti-racism initiatives within government. The commission also obtained an order from the Human Rights Tribunal of Ontario prohibiting segregation of people with mental health disabilities within provincial corrections.

As Chief Commissioner, Mandhane is noted for her efforts to advance reconciliation with Indigenous peoples in Ontario, especially in towns and cities in Northern Ontario. She negotiated a Memorandum of Understanding with the Ontario Federation of Indigenous Friendship Centres. In 2019, she was gifted an eagle feather by traditional knowledge-keeper Maurice Switzer of the Mississaugas of Alderville First Nation. Reflecting on her work at the Commission, Grand Chief Alvin Fiddler stated: "“While leading the Ontario Human Rights Commission, Renu was a strong and vocal advocate for the people of Nishnawbe Aski Nation and defender of the rights of many people across this province."

During her tenure, Mandhane authored a number of opinion editorials in a variety of publications, including the following:

- Mandhane, Renu (April 2, 2020). "Canada must put human rights at the centre of its COVID-19 response". Toronto Star. Archived from the original on April 3, 2020.
- “The public service should reflect the full diversity of our community,” Globe and Mail (23 July 2019)
- “Adam Capay case shows Ontario must eliminate the inhumane practice of segregation,” Globe and Mail (26 February 2019)
- Mandhane, Renu (September 2, 2018). "All children should feel like they belong in school". Toronto Star. Archived from the original on September 3, 2018.
- Mandhane, Renu (January 29, 2018). "A day to remember the tragic consequences of hate". Toronto Star. Archived from the original on January 29, 2018.
- “Leadership needed to fight racism” Thunder Bay Chronicle Journal (25 July 2017)
- “Ottawa’s solitary bill is a start. Now the provinces must do better” Globe and Mail (20 June 2017)
- “Unfounded sexual assault cases: A human-rights issue” Globe and Mail (16 February 2017)

Canadian Lawyer magazine reported that Mandhane, "reinvigorated the OHRC," and that she was "a vocal, courageous and ardent advocate on issues of racial profiling, carding, police oversight, Indigenous rights and the rights of people who are differently abled." Canadian Lawyer noted that Mandhane was in the media steadily, and that she largely what blew open the story of Adam Capay, the young indigenous man who had been in indefinite solitary confinement with the lights on 24/7 for more than four years." The Correctional Investigator of Canada, Dr. Ivan Zinger, stated that, “Mandhane has brought public attention to correctional practices that are discriminatory or violate the human rights of prisoners, including federally sentenced women, Indigenous people, persons with mental health disabilities and immigration detainees," and that she was "a leading voice on national and provincial efforts to end the use of solitary confinement."

Mandhane was appointed judge of the Ontario Superior Court of Justice on May 22, 2020, by Attorney General David Lametti.

== Jurisprudence ==
Justice Mandhane has written on family violence and its impact on children in S.S. v. R.S., 2021 ONSC 2137, its impact on parenting ability and spousal support in A.C. v. K.C., 2023 ONSC 6017, and its impact the availability of restraining orders in JK v RK, 2021 ONSC 1136.

In Ahluwalia v Ahluwalia, 2022 ONSC 1546, Justice Mandhane held that survivors of family violence can sue for monetary damages as part of their family law matter. She created a new tort, which she named the tort of, alternatively named, family violence, domestic violence or coercive control, in support of her findings. However, the Ontario Court of Appeal overturned her ruling in Ahluwalia v. Ahluwalia, ONCA 476, finding that the existing scheme of tort law and existing legislative protections made the creation of a new judge-made cause of action unnecessary. This decision was in turn appealed to the Supreme Court of Canada, which heard arguments from both parties on whether Justice Mandhane erred in recognizing a tort of "family violence". On May 15, 2026, The Supreme Court of Canada voted (6-3) in favour of recognizing a new legal basis of claim of intimate partner violence, therefore upholding the tort Justice Mandhane created. Ahluwalia v. Ahluwalia is a landmark decision of the Supreme Court of Canada which established a common law tort of intimate partner violence.

The Ontario Court of Appeal also overturned an acquittal entered by Justice Mandhane on criminal charges. The complainant had testified that the accused, in her hotel room, forced her at knifepoint to perform fellatio, took a photo of her wearing only a bra and threatened to post it online if she went to the police, robbed her and cut her thumb deeply when they struggled. The accused had testified before Justice Mandhane and gave a different version of events. Crown counsel led evidence to support the complainant’s version of events. Justice Mandhane had found both the complainant and the accused lacked credibility and acquitted the accused of charges of forcible confinement, robbery, uttering threats, sexual assault and aggravated sexual assault. The Court of Appeal granted an appeal and ordered a new trial on the basis that Justice Mandhane had erred in her credibility findings against the complainant and that such findings reflected stereotypes of how victims of sexual assault are supposed to react. The Supreme Court of Canada refused to hear the accused's appeal from the order for his retrial.

== Community engagement ==
Mandhane is a senior fellow of Massey College at the University of Toronto, and a member of the South Asian Bar Association.

Prior to her appointment, Mandhane was involved a number of community organizations including the Centre for Free Expression at Ryerson University, Human Rights Watch, Journalists for Human Rights, the Elizabeth Fry Society of Toronto, Nellie's shelter, and the Metropolitan Action Committee on Violence against Women and Children.

== Awards and recognitions ==
Mandhane has received myriad of awards and recognitions, including:

- South Asian Bar Association of Toronto Juriansz and Joachim Award for Excellence in Human Rights (2025)
- South Asian Bar Association of North America Pioneer Award (2023);
- International Commission of Jurists-Canada’s Tarnipolsky Human Rights Award (2020);
- Excellence Canada’s highest honour, the Special Recognition of Achievement (2019);
- Ed McIsaac Human Rights in Corrections Award (2018)
- Canada’s “Top 25 Most Influential Lawyers” by Canadian Lawyer Magazine (2017),
- Grant’s Desi Achiever Award, Desi Magazine (2016).

Mandhane has been profiled in the following publications:

- Fraser, Ted (May 22, 2020). "Eight women named Ontario court judges". Toronto Star. Archived from the original on May 29, 2020.
- Tim Wilbur and Mallory Hendry, “T he Top 25 Most Influential: Renu Mandhane,” Canadian Lawyer (August 2017);
- Rhianna Schmunk, “Renu Mandhane, Ontario Human Rights Commissioner, Has History of Advocacy,” HuffPost Canada (28 October 2016);
- Andrew Stokes, “Meet Renu Mandhane, Ontario Chief Human Rights Commissioner,” Queen’s University Alumni Review (23 March 2016);
- Lucianna Ciccocioppo, “Out Front: Alumna Renu Mandhane wants everyone to know there’s still a need for the Ontario Human Rights Commission,” Nexus Magazine (Fall/Winter 2015);
- Rankin, Jim (November 1, 2015). "New Ontario Human Rights Commissioner Renu Mandhane vows aggressive approach". Toronto Star. Archived from the original on November 1, 2015.
- Kelly Korducki, “Agent of Change: In her role as head of the International Human Rights Program at U of T, Renu Mandhane is not afraid to ask tough questions,” Precedent Magazine (May 2012)
