= The Age of Entitlement: America Since the Sixties =

2020 non-fiction book by Christopher Caldwell

The Age of Entitlement
- First edition
- Author: Christopher Caldwell
- Language: English
- Subject: sociology, civil rights
- Published: January 2020
- Publisher: Simon & Schuster
- Pages: 349
- ISBN: 1501106899

The Age of Entitlement: America Since the Sixties is a 2020 book by Christopher Caldwell of the conservative Claremont Institute think tank, that observes changes in the social and political fabric of American society since the 1960s and their impact on contemporary life.

== Overview ==
The book puts forward a critique of radical individualism, free-market fundamentalism, and unfettered globalization, and the resulting decay of social norms and civil society institutions over the last several decades. Caldwell argues these transformations were enabled by both left-wing and right-wing political parties but have been detrimental to wide swaths of the American public, particularly in the nation's interior. He is especially critical of Ronald Reagan, stating that he had left behind a movement and a nation more willing to "cut the past away, provided the cutting were done heedlessly by businessmen rather than purposefully by bureaucrats". Originally a revolt of White Americans, he critiques that "Reagan flung open the gates to immigration while stirringly proclaiming a determination to slam them shut". To him, all local victories were paid for by incurring further national debt.

The book has received considerable attention for its chapters addressing the nature and consequences of the Civil Rights Act of 1964. Although originally conceived as a one-time corrective to end segregation and racial discrimination, Caldwell argues that the Act created an endless imperative for social reengineering, at great cost and at the expense of liberty and social cohesion. He argues:

The changes of the 1960s, with civil rights at the core, were not just a major new element in the Constitution. They were a rival constitution, with which the original one was frequently incompatible—and the incompatibility would worsen as the civil rights regime was built out.

Much of what we have called "polarization" or "incivility" in recent years is something more grave—it is the disagreement over which of the two constitutions shall prevail: the de jure constitution of 1788, with all of the traditional forms of jurisprudential legitimacy and centuries of American culture behind it; or the de facto constitution of 1964, which lacks this traditional kind of legitimacy but commands the near-unanimous endorsement of judicial elites and civic educators and the passionate allegiance of those who received it as a liberation. The increasing necessity that citizens choose between these two orders, and the poisonous conflict into which it ultimately drove the country, is what this book describes.

The entrenchment of political correctness ... [made] clear what Americans had done in 1964: They had inadvertently voted themselves a second constitution without explicitly repealing themselves the first one. ... Affirmative action and political correctness were the twin pillars of the second constitution. They were what civil rights was.

Caldwell refers to civil rights legislation as "the most sacred totem in American politics", as well as the "lone metanarrative to survive the acids of postmodernity". To Caldwell, "color-conscious civil rights inexorably followed from color-blind civil rights". He posits the result are absurd disparate impact rulings, of which "eroding the undeserved 'privilege' of whites is the organizing principle". He sees the private sector as "the hammer of civil rights enforcement", although he also writes "corporations, advertisers, and the press did not behave this way out of high-mindedness; they did it, at least initially, as a pragmatic response to the threat of lawsuits. The cliché that businesses hate uncertainty turned out to be true, at least in this regard."

All in all, Caldwell writes that “just as assuming that two parallel lines can meet overturns the whole of Euclidean geometry, eliminating freedom of association from the U.S. Constitution changed everything.” Considering it the "master freedom" above all other liberties, to him "a society that systematically destroys every male-only social club is not a liberal one. A country that seeks to coerce ethnic neighborhoods out of their insularity (through, e.g., forced busing) no longer believes in pluralism." Regarding the eponymous "entitlement", he is especially critical of the Baby boomers but does not view the Greatest Generation very favorably either.

== Reception ==
The Wall Street Journal listed it as one of their Best Political Books of 2020. His core argument has been summarized by others approvingly along these lines:

"America created a situation in which two constitutional regimes occupy the same space. The first one stresses equality of the individual before the law; the other demands that historical injustices be accounted for through affirmative action, racial preferences, and the imposition of judicial authority over broad areas of social and commercial life to ensure the erasure of inequality. The two constitutional regimes, Caldwell maintains, represent opposite and competing visions of society."

One conservative critic notes:

"One defense of the standard interpretation of the civil rights movement might draw on the likes of Mary Ann Glendon to argue that the expansion of “rights talk” to cover every inconvenience under the sun may have been predestined long before the 1960s—Patrick Deneen, among others, might argue that the 1760s would be a better place to start. An unadulterated social-contract approach to rights, untethered to social institutions or traditions, may indeed lead to far-ranging “witches and unicorns” territory pretty quickly; but, as Daniel E. Burns recently reminded us, American society has never been purely Lockean."

His ideas have been applied by conservative legal activists:

"The lawsuit alleging that Harvard discriminates against Asian applicants is one example of this. Education expert Frederick M. Hess of the American Enterprise Institute has proposed busting the college bubble through a disparate-impact lawsuit seeking to invalidate college degree requirements for jobs where they aren’t strictly necessary, the same way Griggs v. Duke Power Company (1971) invalidated intelligence tests."

Writing in The Washington Post, Benjamin C Waterhouse, associate professor of history at the University of North Carolina at Chapel Hill, describes the book's premise as "ahistorical". America's Constitution was not "fixed in cement between 1789 and 1964, only to become tragically untethered by a law that sought, essentially, to enforce the then-96-year-old 14th Amendment", and the idea that civil rights are responsible for this change relies on a "long-debunked caricature of pre-1960s history". He criticizes Caldwell's narrative of white grievance politics.

Brookings Institution fellow Jonathan Rauch describes Caldwell's account as "provocative and pessimistic" in The New York Times, and says that its "one-eyed moral bookkeeping" offers no constructive alternative to endless cultural warfare, while noting that this "seems to be where American conservatism is going". Rauch echoes Waterhouse's critique of the idea that the Civil Rights Act marks a single watershed in Constitutional history, stating: "Reading this overwrought and strangely airless book, one would never imagine a different way of viewing things, one that rejects Caldwell’s ultimatum to 'choose between these two orders.' In that view — my own — America has seen multiple refoundings, among them the Jackson era’s populism, the Civil War era’s abolition of slavery, the Progressive era’s governmental reforms and the New Deal era’s economic and welfare interventions."
