= Walter Currie (educator) =

Canadian teacher and administrator (1922–2014)

- Born: October 1, 1922; Chatham, Ontario
- Died: January 11, 2014 (aged 91); Kitchener, Ontario
- Education: University of Windsor
- Occupations: teacher, educator, human rights activist, activist, civil servant
- Partner: June

Walter Currie (1922–2014) was an educator and public advocate. He was part of the movement after the Second World War advocating for Indigenous educational reform at the local and national level in Canada.

== History ==
Walter Currie was born in Chatham, Ontario in 1922. The son of William and Clara Currie, he was a non-status Indian of Potowatomi and Ojibwe descent. He served three years in the Royal Canadian Air Force during World War Two, and later studied engineering at the University of Toronto, before leaving his studies early to support his young family. He would later complete his degree at the University of Windsor and go on to complete his teacher's certificate at London's Teachers College. He was a school teacher in Kitchener and principal at Danesbury Public School in North York Township between 1953 and 1968. In 1966 he was appointed to head an Ontario Governmental committee on the "Indian in the City." He later became a superintendent with the Ontario Department of Education with responsibilities Indian and northern schools from 1968 to 1971. During this period, he was active in local and provincial affairs, and s quoted in major newspapers on topics related to Indigenous education, discrimination against Indigenous people in urban areas, lack of representation of Indigenous history, language and culture in the media and in school curriculum, as well as the "social ills" of television.

Currie also served as president of the Indian-Eskimo Association of Canada and was the first chairman of the Toronto Indian Friendship Centre from 1969 to 1971. He was one of the first two members of Ontario's Human Rights Commission, and served from 1972 to 1974. In July 1971, Currie was appointed as chair of Native Studies at Trent University, where he served a term to 1975. In this role, Currie continued to be active on provincial and national Indigenous issues, particularly educational reform, repatriation of cultural artifacts, and, entrepreneurial opportunities on- and off-reserve for Indigenous business people. He also co-wrote a commissioned report with Donald L. Faris in 1983, in which they investigated claims that the City of Regina's police force was misusing police dogs. Currie died on January 11, 2014.

== Select publications and speeches ==
- Faris, Donald L; Currie, Walter; Regina Board of Police Commissioners (1983). Review of the Regina Police Service Canine Unit. Regina, Sask.: Regina Board of Police Commissioners.
- Urbanization of Indians; address by W. Currie ... to Mid-Canada Development Corridor Conference [at] Lakehead University, Aug. 20, 1969. Walter Currie, undefinedMid-Canada Development Corridor Conference (eds.). Toronto, Ont.: Indian-Eskimo Association of Canada. 1971.
- Deiter, Walter; Currie, Walter (1970). Presentation to Senate Committee on Poverty. Winnipeg, Manitoba: National Indian Brotherhood of Canada.
- Currie, Walter (1968). "Is the Canadian Indian Act "Legislated Discriminaiton"?". Human Relations. 8 (16): 10–12.
- Currie, Walter (1967). The native Canadian and legislated discrimination: an address by Walter Currie to the Progressive Conservative Centennial Policy Conference, Maison Montmorency, Couville, P.Q., August 6–10, 1967. Toronto: Indian-Eskimo Association of Canada.
- Currie, Walter (1970). Indians and the city: address [delivered at the] "Indians and the City" Conference, Winnipeg, Man., October 1966. Toronto: Indian-Eskimo Association of Canada.
- Currie, Walter (1966). Indians and the city.
