= We Are Doomed =

2009 book by John Derbyshire

We Are Doomed: Reclaiming Conservative Pessimism
- Author: John Derbyshire
- Language: English
- Subject: Western civilization, conservatism, hereditarianism
- Published: September 29, 2009
- Publisher: Crown Forum
- Publication place: United States
- Media type: Print
- Pages: 272
- ISBN: 0307409589

We Are Doomed: Reclaiming Conservative Pessimism is a 2009 non-fiction book by British-American writer John Derbyshire. He draws upon classical conservatism thinking to argue that modern Western civilization is dying and will eventually fail completely. He blames what he sees as a collectivist and Utopian mindset among the political left as well as an irrational optimism and faith in the future on the political right. It was published by Crown Forum.

== Contents ==
Derbyshire sets forth his hereditarian vision of civilization. He states that the natural sciences have revealed as a matter of fact that human beings have a set of innate negative qualities. He views society and culture as something with relatively minor effects on human behavior, writing that people's destinies are essentially half-made at birth. He concludes that some children are inherently not intelligent enough to learn anything beyond simple skills as well as that some ethnic groups are simply incapable of democratic government.

Derbyshire argues that ever greater diversity in race, ethnicity, background, and other factors makes countries more fragile and prone to unrest. He refers to political scientist Robert D. Putnam's statement about the noble challenge of diversity and writes, "Perhaps the idea is that by enlarging and defeating this challenge, we shall be a better nation. In that case, if challenges are so good for us, why not create a few more? I suggest flooding some low lying cities".

He criticizes the modern American conservative movement for accepting what he sees as inherently liberal views about total racial and gender equality. He argues that "thus weakened, conservatism can no longer provide the backbone of cold realism that every organized society needs". Thus, as stated in the title, Derbyshire describes the United States as simply doomed, with the past period of relative peace from the end of World War II to the beginning of the 21st century being a mere anomaly.

== Reviews ==
Grant Morgan wrote for the online magazine Canada's Journal of Ideas that Derbyshire "makes a surprisingly energetic and amusing case" and "does so in a style that is accessible and sharp-witted, though at times unfocused". Morgan commented that he thought Derbyshire's views on culture and religion seem to reach too far and did not fit well with the material on public policy. Overall, Morgan wrote that the author "is likely to convert many readers to congenital pessimism" but fails to conclude the book with any kind of real recommendations or advice about how to fix these failing policies.

Taki Theodoracopulos, a columnist and publisher of Taki's Magazine, commented, "Just when you thought there was nothing to American conservatism but a bunch of blue-blazered fuddy-duddies who talk about global democracy, here comes John Derbyshire, who reminds us all of the place of pessimism and skepticism in the Western tradition. Not a moment too soon."

Theodore Dalrymple, a British author and columnist, referred to the book as, "A funny and brilliant call to pessimism, Man's last, best hope for a tolerable life." He also remarked about it that "Pessimists are not only the only realists; they have all the best jokes." Judge Robert Bork commented that Derbyshire's "argument is wide-ranging, erudite, and invigorating, but, paradoxically, delivered with cheerful panache."

== See also ==
- After America
- America Alone
- The Death of the West
- 2009 in literature
- Hereditarianism
