= Human rights complaints against Maclean's magazine =

Human rights complaints against Maclean's magazine were filed in December 2007 by Mohamed Elmasry of the Canadian Islamic Congress with the Canadian Human Rights Commission, the British Columbia Human Rights Tribunal and the Ontario Human Rights Commission. Maclean's magazine was accused of publishing eighteen Islamophobic articles between January 2005 and July 2007. The articles in question included a column by Mark Steyn titled "The Future Belongs to Islam", an excerpt from a book written by Steyn. The Ontario Human Rights Commission ruled that it did not have the jurisdiction to hear the complaint. The British Columbia Human Rights Tribunal heard the complaint in June 2008 and issued a ruling on October 10, 2008 dismissing the complaint. The Canadian Human Rights Commission dismissed the federal complaint on June 26, 2008 without referring the matter to a tribunal.

== Canadian Human Rights Commission ==
The federal Canadian Human Rights Commission (CHRC) dismissed the Canadian Islamic Congress (CIC)'s complaint against Maclean's in June 2008. The CHRC's ruling said of the article that, "the writing is polemical, colourful and emphatic, and was obviously calculated to excite discussion and even offend certain readers, Muslim and non-Muslim alike." However, the Commission ruled that overall, "the views expressed in the Steyn article, when considered as a whole and in context, are not of an extreme nature, as defined by the Supreme Court."

Faisal Joseph, lawyer for the Canadian Islamic Congress (CIC), responded to the decision by saying that the CIC is disappointed the tribunal made its decision without hearing "the compelling evidence of hate and expert testimony" presented in the CIC's complaint to the British Columbia Human Rights Tribunal.

Maclean's greeted the CHRC's decision stating that it "is in keeping with our long-standing position that the article in question, 'The Future Belongs to Islam,' an excerpt from Mark Steyn's best-selling book America Alone, was a worthy piece of commentary on important geopolitical issues, entirely within the bounds of normal journalistic practice." The magazine also stated that "Maclean's continues to assert that no human rights commission, whether at the federal or provincial level, has the mandate or the expertise to monitor, inquire into, or assess the editorial decisions of the nation's media. And we continue to have grave concerns about a system of complaint and adjudication that allows a media outlet to be pursued in multiple jurisdictions on the same complaint, brought by the same complainants, subjecting it to costs of hundreds of thousands of dollars, to say nothing of the inconvenience. We enthusiastically support those parliamentarians who are calling for legislative review of the commissions with regard to speech issues."

== British Columbia Human Rights Tribunal ==
The British Columbia Human Rights Tribunal heard the case over a five-day period beginning on June 2, 2008; Mohamed Elmasry was not present. The co-complainant in this case is Naiyer Habib, the BC board director for the Canadian Islamic Congress, who filed the complaint on behalf of all Muslims in British Columbia.

Joseph Faisal, legal counsel for the Canadian Islamic Congress opened his arguments by stating that the article Maclean's published made Muslims out to be anti-Canadian and depicted Islam as "inhuman" and "violent." Faisal added that "We're prepared to deal with those articles piece by piece, paragraph by paragraph, and those things that we find objectionable."

Faisal and Habib's complaint claims that Maclean's and Steyn, who wrote the article, violated Section 7-1 of British Columbia's Human Rights Code, Under the BC Human Rights code, the complainants are not required to prove harm, or malicious intent; all that is required is a reasonable determination that the excerpt did express hatred and contempt toward Muslims, and likely caused it to spread.

Faisal implored the BC Human Rights Tribunal to take action, arguing that it is "the court of last resort. You are the only opportunity to right a terrible wrong to a clearly identifiable group numbering hundreds of thousands in this great country, and tens of thousands in the beautiful province of British Columbia. You are the only thing between racist, hateful, contemptuous Islamophobic and irresponsible journalism, and law-abiding Canadian citizens."

Mahmoud Ayoub, a historian of religion with a doctorate from Harvard University, testified that Steyn's claim in his article that Islam is "an underground movement trying to take over the world" has no basis in Islamic scripture or tradition. Ayoub disputed Steyn's interpretation of the word "jihad," asserting that the word has a variety of meanings unrelated to violence. Ayoub also disputed Steyn's portrayal of Islamic extremism as mainstream saying that the extremist fringe represented less than one million of the total 1.5 billion Muslims.

Lawyers for Maclean's defended the content as free speech. Julian Porter, the lead counsel for the magazine, asserted that Steyn's article "does not meet the standard of hatred or contempt, and that's what we'll argue later in the week". The lawyers for Maclean's did not call any witnesses during the week of hearings and instead argued against the complaint on constitutional grounds.

In his closing arguments, Faisal stated that "There has never been a case in this country that has had such clear, concise evidence, ever. There will never be any more demonstrable evidence of hatred that has been perpetrated by this article." Faisal also sharply criticized Julian Porter, one of Maclean's lawyers, stating that:

If [Mr. Porter] had his way, each and every Muslim in the country [would] also bear the additional albatross that, apparently, we as Muslims in the country are responsible, personally, for Osama Bin Laden. How ridiculous - this is the type of mindset that prevails in the media.

The Canadian Association of Journalists and the BC Civil Liberties Association presented a joint submission asking the tribunal to refine its interpretation of hate speech saying that previous rulings have been "overly expansive" and "have consequently brought the institutional legitimacy of the (tribunal) into question."

If Maclean's were found to have violated BC's Human Rights Code, it could have faced sanctions, including paying "an amount that the member or panel considers appropriate to compensate that person for injury to dignity, feelings and self respect or to any of them." However, Faisal has stated that he only wants the Tribunal to order Maclean's to publish "an appropriate response." The Tribunal's hearing concluded on June 8, 2008.

=== Comments following the hearings ===
Steyn told the media that he was hoping the tribunal would rule against Maclean's. "We want to lose so we can take it to a real court and if necessary up to the Supreme Court of Canada and we can get the ancient liberties of free-born Canadian citizens that have been taken away from them by tribunals like this," he said. Steyn was not called to testify at the hearing but was in attendance for several of the five days of the proceedings.

The day after the hearing ended, Khurrum Awan, one of the complainants in the BC case, spoke to a meeting of the Canadian Arab Federation and complained that since Maclean's is not a member of the Ontario Press Council or any similar body there is no authority within the profession of journalism, that can "condemn the journalist, condemn the publication, direct them to publish a letter to the editor." Awan also stated that:

And we have to tell them, you know what, if you're not going to allow us to do that, there will be consequences. You will be taken to the human rights commission, you will be taken to the press council, and you know what? If you manage to get rid of the human rights code provisions [on hate speech], we will then take you to the civil courts system. And you know what? Some judge out there might just think that perhaps it's time to have a tort of group defamation, and you might be liable for a few million dollars.

At the Niagara-on-the-Lake conference of the Canadian Association of Statutory Human Rights Agencies in June 2008, Wahida Valiante, national vice-president of the Canadian Islamic Congress, stated that the commissions are the only recourse available to minorities treated unfairly in the media since membership in press councils is optional and criminal hate speech charges require the consent of the federal Attorney-General.

Valiante compared Steyn to James Keegstra, an Alberta high school teacher who taught and tested his students on how Jews "created the Holocaust to gain sympathy. They basically talk about the same theories. This is not a civil dialogue." She said that, in Germany, long before the Holocaust, "it was the words that set the stage for what happened later on.... We may end up with the same fate, and that is at the heart of why [the complainants] wanted to take this on."

Haroon Siddiqui, a columnist for the Toronto Star, wrote that "Only genuine misunderstanding or deliberate distortion can explain the media's mostly one-sided discourse on the case of Maclean's before the federal, as well as the Ontario and British Columbia, human rights commissions." Siddiqui asserted that the Canadian media "do not publish racist cartoons and anti-Semitic rants" and "that Maclean's published a series of virulent articles about Muslims itself speaks volumes." Siddiqui also wrote that Mark Steyn's article was "a 4,800-word piece portraying Muslims as a menace to the West.".

=== Ruling ===
On October 10, 2008, the tribunal dismissed the complaint, stating that the Maclean's article did not violate the province's human rights law.

The Tribunal stated that "With all its inaccuracies and hyperbole, [the article] has resulted in political debate which, in our view, [B. C.'s hate speech human rights law] was never intended to suppress. In fact, as the evidence in this case amply demonstrates, the debate has not been suppressed and the concerns about the impact of hate speech silencing a minority have not been borne out."

=== Comments following the ruling ===
Faisal Joseph, lawyer for the CIC, stated that he may appeal because the decision "sends the wrong message." In a statement, Joseph wrote that "it is now acceptable for some columnists and media in this country to cloak freedom to hate in the mantle of freedom of speech." However, Joseph also stated that:

Our objective of exposing Maclean's and Mark Steyn for their falsehoods, and misrepresentation and stereotyping of Muslims has been achieved. We are delighted the tribunal has discredited the content of the articles that Maclean's and Mark Steyn have been publishing about Islam and Muslims. We also appreciate the tribunal's citing of the vitriolic blogs related to the Maclean's article as some evidence that the article exposes Muslims to hatred and contempt...On the whole, however, the case was a leap forward in the struggle against media-propagated Islamophobia. The fact that human rights commissions in Ontario and B. C. have recognized the role of Canada's national news magazine in promoting societal intolerance towards Muslim Canadians and in publishing false and exaggerated material highlights the urgent need for editors and newscasters to critically examine how they represent Muslims in their news and editorial coverage.

Mark Steyn, who wrote the offending article, felt that his high-profile status prevented sanctions, adding that,

For me the problem is not the book, the problem for me is Canada, and I will never think of the deranged dominion quite the same way again. It has made me understand just how easily and incrementally free societies, often for the most fluffy reasons, slip into a kind of soft, beguiling totalitarianism. I don't understand why they lack the cojones to find us guilty

and that "The only reason to go through all this nonsense is to get to the stage where you can appeal it to a real court, and if necessary up to the Supreme Court". Steyn further criticized the Human Rights Commissions and Canadian politicians, stating that

they didn't like the heat they were getting under this case. Life was chugging along just fine, chastising non-entities nobody had ever heard about, piling up a lot of cockamamie jurisprudence that inverts the principles of common law, and nobody paid any attention to it. Once they got the glare of publicity from the Maclean's case, the kangaroos decided to jump for the exit. I've grown tired of the number of Canadian members of Parliament who've said to me over the last best part of a year now, "Oh, well of course I fully support you, I'm fully behind you, but I'd just be grateful if you didn't mention my name in public".

Julian Porter, the lawyer for Rogers Publishing (which owns Maclean's) stated that,

It means that when you're making an editorial decision, you have to look over your shoulder at this grey, fuzzy monster of the human rights commission ...Suddenly, we're in a position where an immense group can, in effect, bring a libel action without the libel defences [of truth or fair comment].

=== Other criticism ===
The complaints prompted criticism of the CIC from various writers as well as a federal cabinet minister, Secretary of State for Multiculturalism Jason Kenney, who said "attacking opinions expressed by a columnist in a major magazine is a pretty bold attack on the basic Canadian value of freedom of the press and freedom of expression."

Brian Hutchinson, of the National Post, criticized the BC Human Rights Tribunal for agreeing to hear testimony from Khurrum Awan, one of the student lawyers who helped with the human rights complaint in Ontario on how Muslims in British Columbia were affected by the article. Maclean's argued that because Awan is not a resident of British Columbia, he should not be allowed to give testimony about the harm the article allegedly caused to Muslims in BC. However, Heather MacNaughton, the Chairwoman of the Tribunal, allowed his testimony, justifying the decision by stating that "strict rules of evidence do not apply" in cases before the Tribunal.

Jason Gratl of the Canadian Association of Journalists and the BC Civil Liberties Association criticized the hearing, stating that "We're of the view in the first place that the human rights tribunal doesn't have any business deciding what appropriate expression in Canada might be. Its activities and jurisdictions undermine the ability of journalists and members of the public to discuss important public issues such as race and religion."

Ezra Levant, former publisher of the Western Standard magazine, and the former subject of a complaint to the Alberta Human Rights and Citizenship Commission, opined that "I think this strikes at press freedom and even the freedom of thought of all Canadians. I think it's really an embarrassment that this is happening."

== Ontario Human Rights Commission ==
In April, 2008 the Ontario Human Rights Commission (OHRC) stated that it did not have jurisdiction to hear the complaint, launched by Elmasry, based on a gap in the legislation (the relevant portions of the Ontario Human Rights Code only address discrimination via signs or symbols, not printed material). Despite not having jurisdiction, the Commission published a statement saying that Maclean's media coverage "has been identified as contributing to Islamophobia and promoting societal intolerance towards Muslim, Arab and South Asian Canadians". The Commission indicated that more discussion on the topic of Islamophobia in the media was warranted.

=== Ruling ===
While it dismissed the complaint by the CIC against Maclean's, the OHRC also issued a statement saying the article in question "portray[ed] Muslims as all sharing the same negative characteristics, including being a threat to 'the West'," and thus promoted prejudice towards Muslims and others. In an interview, Chief Commissioner Barbara Hall stated that "When the media writes, it should exercise great caution that it's not promoting stereotypes that will adversely impact on identifiable groups. I think one needs to be very careful when one speaks in generalities, that in fact one is speaking factually about all the people in a particular group."

=== Comments following the ruling ===
==== Response from Canadian Islamic Congress ====
Faisal Joseph, a lawyer for the complainants, praised the commission's decision. Acknowledging the complaint was likely to fail, he said, " we thought this would be an excellent way to demonstrate the gaping hole in human rights legislation in Ontario, and the [Commission] has done exactly that." He also noted that other provincial human rights codes have provisions countering polemics.

==== Criticism of Hall and the OHRC ====
Hall's statement drew criticism from a number of sources.

Tarek Fatah, a founder of the Muslim Canadian Congress stated, "to refer to Maclean's magazine and journalists as contributing to racism is bullshit, if you can use that word [...] there are within the staff [of the Ontario Human Rights Commission], and among the commissioners, hardline Islamic supporters of Islamic extremism, and this [handling of the Maclean's case] reflects their presence over there[...] In the eyes of the Ontario human rights commission, the only good Muslim is an Islamist Muslim. As long as we hate Canada, we will be cared for. As soon as we say Canada is our home and we have to defend her traditions, freedoms and secular democracy, we will be considered as the outside."

As reported by an article from Barbara Kay in the National Post, Fatah stated in a press conference (on October 2, 2008) that the OHRC has been "infiltrated by Islamists" and that some of its commissioners are closely linked to the Canadian Islamic Congress and the Canadian Arab Federation, both of which, according to Fatah, have "contempt for Canadian values."

Jonathan Kay, a columnist for the National Post also criticized Hall's leadership of the OHRC in the aftermath of the decision, writing that Hall had been influenced by "radicals" in the OHRC bureaucracy. Kay also stating that the OHRC statement was "a genuinely frightening manifesto written by people who have a thinly disguised contempt for press freedom and heterodox opinions." Kay argued that if a media outlet chooses "to be "unfair," or simply to have an opinion that some people, or even everyone, disagrees with, that's our right. We'll pay the price in lost readers and advertisers." Mark Steyn, who wrote the article in Maclean's that the complaint was based on, commented that "Even though they (the OHRC) don't have the guts to hear the case, they might as well find us guilty. Ingenious!"

==== Hall's response ====
In an interview, Hall defended her actions and her comments about Maclean's, stating that:

Every day we comment on things that aren't [formal] cases. Part of our job is to identify discrimination and to work to address it, but more often it is putting out a statement, having a debate, meeting with people, discussing and understanding the impact. Whenever we comment on what someone has said or done, we comment because we want them to think about the Human Rights Code, and the implications of it, and to think seriously about what they're saying or doing does to other people. I think that's an important and legitimate part of our role... I think that part of freedom of speech is being able to say things and another part of it is being able to be critical of things that are said. I don't view it as a chill. I view it as responsibility.

==== Maclean's responds ====
The editors of Maclean's denounced the OHRC for its "zealous condemnation of their journalism" accusing them of "morphing out of their conciliatory roles to become crusaders working to reshape journalistic discourse in Canada." Maclean's alleged that Hall's press release was "a drive-by smear," and "perhaps the greatest disappointment in this whole saga." The editors claimed that "[Hall] cited no evidence, considered no counter-arguments, and appointed herself prosecutor, judge and jury in one fell swoop. If we weren't tolerant and charitable people, we'd be calling for her resignation."

==== OHRC's letter to Maclean's ====
In April 2008, OHRC Chief Commissioner Barbara Hall wrote a letter to Maclean's, which the magazine subsequently published as a letter to the editor. Hall wrote that once that decision to dismiss the complaint was made, the OHRC was "free to comment on the issues raised. We followed the correct process for both aspects of our mandate under section 29 of the Ontario Human Rights Code – protecting and promoting human rights in order to create "... a climate of understanding and mutual respect for the dignity and worth of each person...," as set out in the Preamble.

Hall further stated that:

Maclean's and its writers are free to express their opinions. The OHRC is mandated to express what it sees as unfair and harmful comment or conduct that may lead to discrimination. We need to keep in mind that freedom of expression is not the only right in the Charter. There is a full set of rights accorded to all members of our society, including freedom from discrimination. No single right is any more or less important than another. And the enjoyment of one depends on the enjoyment of the other. This means if you want to stand up and defend the right to freedom of expression then you must be willing to do the same for the right to freedom from discrimination. The human rights system exists in Canada, in part, to shine a light on prejudice and to provoke debate – and action. We called for debate and dialogue; we still do. We have taken controversial views before and no doubt will again. That is inevitable because we have a mandate to promote change – away from unfair stereotypes and discriminatory behaviour and towards a culture of human rights. We agree with the Editors of Maclean's: critics are entitled to their opinions. Sometimes we must be critical. We have that duty, enshrined in law, to speak up on human rights issues of the day – and we will continue to do so.

== Subsequent statements by Elmasry ==
Elmasry stated that "You should understand there is a difference between criticizing a religion, OK, comparing it to another religion, and to make a mockery of the symbol of that religion. This is up to the legal system to decide.""

== Subsequent statements by Khurrum Awan ==
In a subsequent interview with the Canadian Arab News, Khurrum Awan stated that, although all of the complaints were dismissed, "We attained our strategic objective — to increase the cost of publishing anti-Islamic material"; Awan claimed that Maclean's collective legal costs for the complaints was approximately $2 million."

== Subsequent legislative action ==
The case has been cited as a motivating factor in the repeal of Section 13 of the Canadian Human Rights Act.

== See also ==
- Censorship in Canada
- Hate speech laws in Canada
