= Ena Chadha =

Indo-Canadian human rights lawyer and investigator

Ena Chadha is an Indo-Canadian human rights lawyer, investigator, author and educator, known for her equality rights litigation and adjudication. She was appointed as the interim Chief Commissioner of the Ontario Human Rights Commission (OHRC) on July 22, 2020. Chadha was the 2019 recipient of the Indo-Canada Chamber of Commerce's Female Professional of the Year Award. She was a co-reviewer of allegations of racism within the Peel District School Board, the second largest public school board in Canada, in 2019.

== Biography ==
Ena Chadha was born in New Delhi, India, and moved to Canada at 2 years of age. She first lived in the Regent Park area of Toronto, Ontario, and later settled in Brampton, Ontario, where she attended elementary and high school, graduating from North Park Secondary School in 1986. Chadha has a journalism degree from Ryerson University, a law degree from University of Saskatchewan, and a Masters of Law degree from Osgoode Hall Law School, York University.

== Family ==
Chadha's parents are Rajinder and Mohinder Chadha and she has a sister, Meena Chadha. After her mother's death, Chadha and her family established an entrance scholarship at the University of Saskatchewan for a first year female law student of indigenous background to honour her mother's legacy of community service and belief in supporting disadvantaged women.

== Career ==
Chadha was appointed as the interim Chief Commissioner of the Ontario Human Rights Commission on July 22, 2020. Her appointment came at a critical moment as the OHRC sought to address human rights issues emerging from the COVID-19 pandemic, while initiating a Right to Read public inquiry and a systemic racism inquiry into the Toronto Police Services.

Highlights of Chadha's career include being the chair of the board of directors of the Human Rights Legal Support Center (2018-2020), Director of Litigation of ARCH: Disability Law Centre (2000-2007) and her appointment as vice-chair at the Human Rights Tribunal of Ontario (2007-2015), where she was a mediator and adjudicator rendering important rulings in the areas of race discrimination and sexual harassment. Chadha has been recognized by the Canadian Bar Association as a "Leader of Change" for her work in challenging institutionalized inequality and racial barriers.

Throughout her career, Ena Chadha has been a vocal advocate for systemic change, particularly in areas affecting underrepresented groups. Her work in disability law, both as a lawyer and as an academic, has contributed to significant policy changes in Ontario and beyond. Ena Chadha’s efforts have been recognized with numerous awards, reflecting her influence on Canadian human rights and her commitment to creating a more equitable society. In 2019, Ena Chadha was honoured by the Indo-Canada Chamber of Commerce as Female Professional of the Year. She received the 2022 Canadian Law Awards Female Trailblazer Award, celebrating her contributions to the legal field and her advocacy work. Ena Chadha was the sole recipient of the Ontario Bar Association’s 2022 Distinguished Service Award and the Public Law Award of Excellence. In 2023, Ena Chadha was awarded the prestigious Law Society Medal for her exceptional contributions to the legal profession in Ontario and was recognized by the South Asian Bar Association with the Legal Excellence Award. Ena Chadha currently serves as the Law Society of Ontario’s member representative on the Ontario Judicial Council, dealing with issues of judicial ethics and conduct.

Ena Chadha is an Executive Producer of the Oscar-nominated documentary To Kill A Tiger. The film, which has received international acclaim, explores the stigma surrounding sexual violence and examines the impact of cultural biases on survivors of sexual assault. Her involvement in this project highlights her commitment to advocating for equity beyond the courtroom, utilizing film as a medium to champion social justice and promote community activism and meaningful dialogue.

== Publications ==
Chadha has written extensively on the topic of human rights. Her articles have been published in the Supreme Court Law Review, National Journal of Constitutional Law and Journal of Law and Social Policy. She has contributed to equality rights books and co-wrote a chapter in a 2018 Oxford University Press treatise about international human rights law for women with disabilities and is a frequent public speaker promoting human rights.

Ena Chadha is a prolific writer on topics related to social justice, equity and disability rights. Her opinion pieces have been featured in prominent media outlets, including The Toronto Star, where she authored the widely read piece, “A Black man, a fatal police shooting, and a widow who didn’t back down: The 1979 case that electrified the city and launched a movement.” The article reflects on a pivotal police shooting case in Toronto that galvanized local activism and underscored the need for policing reform and race relations. In The Conversation, Ena Chadha addressed workplace harassment in her piece, “Frank Stronach allegations highlight harassment in the workplace,” examining the dynamics of power and gender in work environments. Ena Chadha’s legal scholarship includes co-authoring articles with Emmett Rogers on advancing equity rights, such as “What does a lawyer look like? Time to truly embody diversity and inclusion” in the Ontario Bar Association’s JUST magazine (November 2022). Chadha and Rogers also co-authored “Does the SCC give a ‘freak’ about disability dignity?: The inclusion fallacy 25 years after Eldridge,” published in the Supreme Court Law Review (2022), offering insights on the need for increased disability representation in legal discourse.

=== List of articles ===
- Chadha, E. (Spring 1989). "Sins of Omission". Ryerson Review of Journalism.
- Chadha, E. and Holder B. (2002). "Case Commentary - Turnbull, et al. v. Famous Players". Journal of Law and Social Policy. 17: 145–156. doi:10.60082/0829-3929.1047. S2CID 146772406.
- Chadha, E. and Schatz, L. (2004). "Human Dignity and Economic Integrity For Persons With Disabilities: A Commentary on the Supreme Court's Decisions in Granovsky and Martin". Journal of Law and Social Policy. 19: 94–122. doi:10.60082/0829-3929.1030. S2CID 54580375.
- Chadha, E. and Sheldon, T. (2004). "Promoting Equality: Economic and Social Rights For Persons With Disabilities Under Section 15". National Journal of Constitutional Law. 16: 25–98.
- Chadha, E. (2005). "Running on Empty: The 'Not So Special Status' Of Paratransit Services In Ontario". Windsor Review of Legal and Social Issues. 20: 1–40.
- Rosenbaum, P. and Chadha, E. (2006). "Reconstructing Disability: Integrating Disability Theory into Section 15". Supreme Court Law Review (2d). 33: 343–365.
- Chadha, E. (2008). "'Mentally Defectives' Not Welcome: Mental Disability in Canadian Immigration Law, 1859-1927". Disability Studies Quarterly Journal. 28 (1).
- Chadha, E. (2010). "Human Rights Disclosure Litigation: Uncovering Invisible Medical Records". Windsor Yearbook of Access to Justice. 28: 153. doi:10.22329/wyaj.v28i1.4493.
- Chadha, E. (2015). "Communicate Clearly: A Key Way to Protect Against Human Rights Complaints". Canadian Journal of Physician Leadership. 2 (2): 42.

=== Book chapters ===
- Chadha, E. (2004). "The Social Phenomenon of Handicapping". Adding Feminism to Law: The Contributions of Justice Claire L'Heureux-Dubé. Toronto: Irwin Law. pp. 209–227.
- Mykitiuk, R. and Chadha, E. (2010). "Sites of Exclusion: Disabled Women's Sexual and Reproductive Rights". In Basser, L.A., Jones, M. & Rioux, M. (ed.). Critical Perspectives on Human Rights and Disability Law. Martinus Nijhoff, Brill Publishers.
- Chadha, E. and Mykitiuk, R. (2018). "Article 6 Women With Disabilities". In Bantekas, I., Stein, M.A. & Anastasiou, D. (ed.). The UN Convention on the Rights of Persons with Disabilities. Oxford University Press.
