= Dorothea Crittenden =

Canadian deputy minister

Dorothea Crittenden (30 April 1915 – 6 December 2008) was a Canadian deputy minister for the Ministry of Community and Social Services from 1974 to 1978. With this position, Crittenden was the first female in Ontario to become a deputy minister. Before her deputy position, Crittenden was with the Department of Public Welfare where she helped with the creation of the General Welfare Assistance Act for Ontario and the Canada Assistance Plan between the 1950s and 1960s. After leaving the ministry, Crittenden was the first female to become chair of the Ontario Human Rights Commission from 1978 to 1981. Between the 1980s and 1990s, Crittenden worked for the Ontario Nursing Home Complaints Committee as their chair and was a government consultant.

== Early life and education ==
Crittenden was born on 30 April 1915 in Blyth, Ontario. During her childhood, Crittenden worked as a babysitter throughout the Great Depression and lived with her parents in St. Thomas, Ontario. For her education, Crittenden went to London Normal School for teacher training. During the 1930s, Crittenden attended Alma College for secretarial courses and studied social science at the University of Toronto.

== Career ==
=== Early career and government positions ===
In 1932, Crittenden went to Dryden, Ontario, and worked as a teacher. As a mail order employee, Crittenden held a summer job with Eaton's during the early 1930s. In 1937, Crittenden joined the Department of Public Welfare section of the Government of Ontario. At the beginning of her governmental career, Crittenden held administrative positions before becoming a statistician.

After becoming the first female personnel director for Ontario at the start of the 1950s, Crittenden was hired as an executive assistant at the end of the 1950s. Between the 1950s and 1960s, Crittenden helped create the General Welfare Assistance Act for the province of Ontario and the Canada Assistance Plan. Between 1967 and 1974, Crittenden worked as an assistant deputy minister. For six years during this period, the Department of Public Welfare was known as the Department of Social and Family Services before becoming the Ministry of Community and Social Services.

Crittenden worked in finance while in her assistant deputy minister position before becoming deputy minister in 1974. Upon holding this position for the Community and Social Services ministry, Crittenden became the first female in Ontario to become a deputy minister. While starting her tenure, Crittenden decided to drive an Oldsmobile while working for half a year instead of an executive car. By the end of her deputy minister position in 1978, Crittenden was the only woman to hold this role for Ontario.

=== Human rights and other positions ===
In January 1978, Crittenden was the first female chosen by the Ontario Human Rights Commission to become their chair. She was selected to replace Thomas Symons. Before becoming part of the OHRC, Crittenden had planned to continue her career in civil service and leave her deputy minister position. Upon the announcement, Bruce McLeod left the OHRC upon Crittenden's hiring. McLeod and Stephen Lewis believed Crittenden was "a low-profile career civil servant" and should have not been selected.

While working as the commission's chair in February 1978, Crittenden opined that reactions to the murder of Emanuel Jaques would prevent the public from agreeing to make discrimination against homosexuals illegal under the Ontario Human Rights Code. Crittenden also said adding rights for homosexuals under the code could be revisited in the future. When a 1980 affirmative action Ontario Human Rights Code policy to address employment discrimination against minority groups was created, Crittenden stated that a "quota system is the simplest way to correct past discrimination, but not necessarily the fairest".

Crittenden remained in her executive position with the OHRC until 1981. After leaving the OHRC, Crittenden was a government consultant for the province from the 1980s to 1990s, while also working for the Ontario Nursing Home Complaints Committee as their chair. Her committee released a summary of findings in 1986 on visits to over 180 Ontarian nursing homes.

== Death ==
Crittenden died on 6 December 2008 in Toronto.
