= Christopher Caldwell (journalist) =

American journalist (born 1962)

- Born: 1962 (age 63–64); Lynn, Massachusetts, U.S.
- Education: Harvard College
- Occupations: Journalist, editor, author, writer
- Writing career
- Language: English
- Genre: Journalism

Christopher Caldwell (born 1962) is a conservative American journalist. He is a contributing writer for The New York Times and The Wall Street Journal, a contributing editor at the Claremont Review of Books, and a member of the editorial committee of the French quarterly Commentaire. He is the author of Reflections on the Revolution in Europe: Immigration, Islam and the West and The Age of Entitlement: America Since the Sixties. Previously, he was a senior editor at the now defunct The Weekly Standard and a columnist for the Financial Times. He was also a former contributor of book reviews to Slate.

== Early life and education ==
Caldwell was born in Lynn, Massachusetts, and graduated from Harvard College.

== Career ==
He was a senior editor at the now defunct The Weekly Standard and a columnist for the Financial Times. He was also a former contributor of book reviews to Slate. He has been a contributing writer for The New York Times and The Wall Street Journal, a contributing editor at the Claremont Review of Books, and a member of the editorial committee of the French quarterly Commentaire.

== Works ==
Caldwell's 2009 book Reflections on the Revolution in Europe, which deals with increased Muslim immigration to Europe, received mixed reactions. The Economist newspaper called it "an important book as well as a provocative one: the best statement to date of the pessimist's position on Islamic immigration in Europe." Others were more blunt, accusing Caldwell of stoking what The Guardian referred to as a "culture of fear".

In 2020, Caldwell published The Age of Entitlement, in which he argues that the civil rights movement has had significant unintended consequences: "Just half a decade into the civil rights revolution, America had something it had never had at the federal level, something the overwhelming majority of its citizens would never have approved: an explicit system of racial preference. Plainly the civil rights acts had wrought a change in the country's constitutional culture." Caldwell writes that the Civil Rights Act of 1964 was "not just a major new element in the Constitution" but "a rival constitution, with which the original one was frequently incompatible."

It was reviewed in The New York Times, The Wall Street Journal, and the Claremont Review of Books. Richard Aldous wrote in The Wall Street Journal, "It's curious that a book subtitled 'America Since the Sixties' doesn't actually have much history in it," going on to say: "The reader turns the page expectantly, waiting to see what Mr. Caldwell has to say about President Trump. We will never know, at least not from reading this book, because Mr. Caldwell ends in 2015. ... That's a shame, because 'The Age of Entitlement' raises important questions not just about the future of the republic but about Western society more generally."

== Personal life ==
Caldwell's wife, Zelda, is the daughter of journalist Robert Novak. His daughter, Lucy Caldwell, was the campaign manager for Joe Walsh's presidential campaign challenging Donald Trump for the Republican nomination in 2020. Caldwell is Catholic.
