= Stella Steyn =

Irish artist (1907–1987)

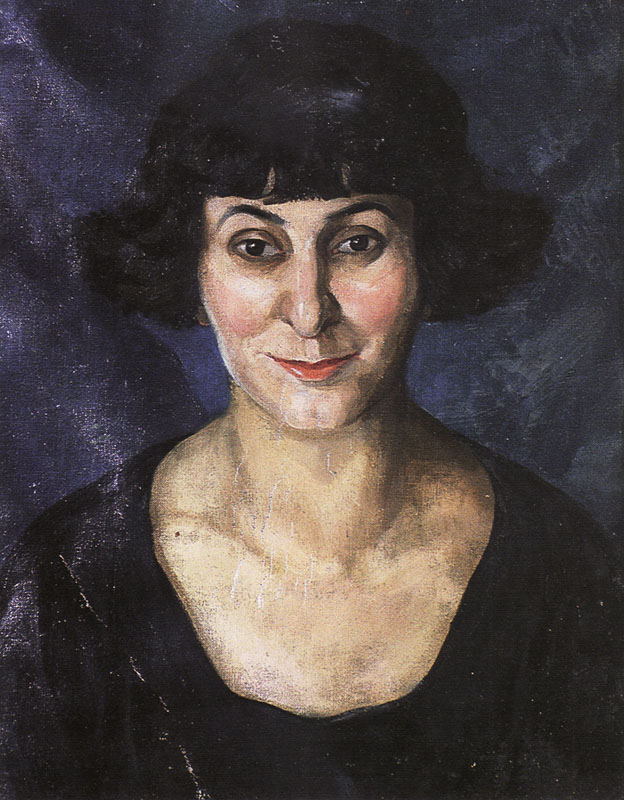
- Portrait of Steyn by Patrick Tuohy
- Born: 26 December 1907; Dublin, Ireland
- Died: 21 July 1987 (aged 79)
- Education: Alexandra College
- Notable work: Illustrations for James Joyce's Finnegans Wake

Stella Steyn (26 December 1907 – 21 July 1987) was an Irish artist.

== Early life ==
Steyn was born in Dublin in 1907 to William Steyn (a dentist) and Bertha Jaffé, who met and married in Limerick, having moved to Ireland from Akmenė, Lithuania. She was Jewish.

Steyn studied at Alexandra College and in 1924 the Dublin Metropolitan School of Art, she was taught by Patrick Tuohy who introduced her to the Cézanne style of art. Much of Steyn's early work was inspired by Harry Clarke and Aubrey Beardsley.

== Career ==
In 1926, aged 18, in the company of her mother and fellow artist Hilda Roberts, she went to Paris to study at the Académie Scandinave and at La Grande Chaumière. She worked in the Arts Quarter (Montaparnasse) and called Paris “the most stimulating place for the artist who really wants to work”.

While in Paris she met Samuel Beckett, as well as James Joyce. She became friends with Joyce's daughter, Lucia and was asked to illustrate Joyce's Finnegans Wake. She did not understand the piece, but it was explained to her by Joyce and was specifically asked to respond to its musicality.

In 1928, Steyn's first individual art show was held in St Stephen's Green at the Dublin Painter's Gallery. She exhibited a variety of forms, including etchings, watercolours and pencil drawings. That same year Steyn entered into Sur La Glace, she did not win but was awarded a silver medal at the Tailteann Games. She also competed in the art competitions at the 1928 Summer Olympics.

Between 1927 and 1930 she had 19 works displayed in the Royal Hibernian Academy, four of which were of the female figure. In 1929 she had an exhibition in Manhattan and embarked on a tour of France and Germany visiting Avignon, Toulon and Marseilles. She felt her work was underappreciated in Ireland and returned to continue her study at La Grande Chaumiere and then Académie Scandinave.

She enrolled at the Bauhaus in Germany in 1931, becoming the first known Irish artist to study at the Bauhaus. She was taught by Wassily Kandinsky, Paul Klee and Joseph Albers. She began to feel disillusioned by the methods while there, but continued her study until 1932 when she moved to Kunstgewerbeschule, Stuttgart.

In 1938, she married David Ross, a professor of French at the University of London, whom she had met in Germany in 1933. They lived in England, where Ross worked as an academic in a number of universities. Steyn stayed mostly out of the public sphere after this rarely displaying her work. However, In 1947 Ladies in a Vase was completed and in 1952 she featured in the Carnegie institute Exhibition Pittsburgh.

== Legacy ==
Little known in Ireland for many years, a retrospective exhibition of her work held at Dublin's Gorry Gallery in 1995, and The Molesworth Gallery in 2001, renewed critical interest in her work.

One of her paintings, Still Life - Flowers, was displayed in the British Prime Minister's residence during the ministry of Gordon Brown, chosen by his wife, Sarah Brown. Her work can be seen at the Tatha Gallery in Fife, Scotland.
