= Reflections on the Revolution in Europe =

2009 book by Christopher Caldwell

Reflections on the Revolution In Europe
- Author: Christopher Caldwell
- Language: English
- Subject: Islam, Europe, Immigration
- Genre: Non-fiction
- Publication date: 2009
- Pages: 422
- ISBN: 0385518269
- Dewey Decimal: 304.8088297094
- LC Class: D1056.2.M87 C35

Reflections on the Revolution in Europe: Immigration, Islam, and the West is a 2009 book by Christopher Caldwell about the impact of the mass immigration of Muslims to Europe in the 20th century.

== Summary ==
The New York Times summarizes Caldwell as follows: "When an insecure, malleable, relativistic culture [Europe's] meets a culture that is anchored, confident, and strengthened by common doctrines [Islam's], it is generally the former that changes to suit the latter."

Caldwell argues that the mass immigration of Muslims to European cities has altered the culture of Europe because of a strong Muslim reluctance to assimilate to the culture of their new homelands. Muslim immigrants do not so much enhance European culture as they supplant it. Caldwell asserts that Muslim immigrants are patiently conquering Europe's cities, "street by street."

He considers "the most chilling observation" to be that "the debate over Muslim immigration in Europe is one that the continent can't openly have, because anyone remotely critical of Islam is branded as Islamophobic. Europe's citizens — as well as its leaders, its artists and, crucially, its satirists — are scared to speak because of a demonstrated willingness by Islam's fanatics to commit violence against their perceived opponents. There exists, Mr. Caldwell writes, a kind of 'standing fatwa' against Islam's critics."

Caldwell predicts that immigration's ultimate impact will vary throughout Europe. Britain is most susceptible to violence and political extremism. Sweden has the greatest problem with isolation and segregation of immigrants. Spain, already beset by questions of national unity, is most vulnerable to being swamped by the sheer volume of immigration. Turks in Germany may slowly assimilate. Finally, France will continue to experience "spectacular social problems" but its republican traditions offer the best hope for fully assimilating immigrants' children and grandchildren.

According to The Observer, "Caldwell cuts to shreds the conventional wisdom of the 'immigrationist' ideology - the view that mass immigration is inevitable and in any case a necessary injection of youth into our ageing continent. He shows, contrary to the immigrationists, that the flows of recent decades are unprecedented. He also demolishes the economic and welfare-state arguments for mass immigration.... One of the most startling figures in the book is that the number of foreign residents in Germany rose from 3 million to 7.5 million between 1971 and 2000 but the number of employed foreigners stayed the same at 2 million."

The Observer noted, "Caldwell is at his best describing the confused cultural and intellectual condition of much of Europe at the time the first waves of immigrants were arriving. It was hard, he points out, to follow Europe's rules and embrace its values when Europeans themselves were rewriting those rules and reassessing those values.... The idea of national traditions and solidarities came to be scorned by liberals in many European countries."

== Reception ==
Dwight Garner for The New York Times praised the book as not at all "aggrieved or unruly. On the contrary, Mr. Caldwell, a senior editor at the Weekly Standard and a columnist for the Financial Times, compiles his arguments patiently, twig by twig, and mostly with lucidity and intellectual grace and even wit."

Martin Woollacott for The Guardian concluded that Caldwell "is right to argue that immigration on the scale that Europe has experienced constitutes a risky experiment to which we need not have submitted ourselves, and of which the final result is not yet clear. He is right that we frequently talk about it in stupid and dishonest ways. If his book sharpens a so far sluggish debate, it will have served an important purpose."

David Goodhart of The Observer argued that "Caldwell somewhat overstates the case... This is a declamatory, polemical work and no more so than in its treatment of Islam. In fact, the book is really two essays - one an insightful probing of Europe's confusion about postwar immigration; the other a rather cartoonish polemic about the potential Islamic takeover of Europe.

Kenan Malik in New Humanist acknowledged that "What is different about Caldwell is the high praise garnered by his book not simply from right-wing critics of immigration but from many liberals too," but concluded that "Reflections on the Revolution in Europe is trenchantly written and robustly argued. It is complex and often subtle. It is also fundamentally wrong in both premise and conclusion. ... Caldwell confuses the diversity of peoples and the diversity of values."

In a substantial review for the British Institute of Race Relations, Matt Carr argues that while Caldwell's arguments are "considerably more sophisticated", "there is virtually nothing in his book that would be out of place in any other examples of the 'green peril' genre". Carr further laments the book's "lackadaisical attitude towards factual accuracy", a "[tendency] evident on numerous occasions", and the "uncritical reception given to [this] artful anti-Muslim diatribe in liberal circles", "a depressing reminder of the extent to which its essential assumptions have moved from the political margins to form a new mainstream consensus."

The book has been considered to advance the Eurabia theory of Bat Ye'or.
