= The Death of the West =

2001 book by Patrick J. Buchanan

- Author: Patrick J. Buchanan
- Language: English
- Publisher: St. Martin's Griffin
- Publication date: 2001
- Publication place: United States
- Media type: Print (hardcover and paperback)
- Pages: 320
- Preceded by: A Republic, Not an Empire

The Death of the West: How Dying Populations and Immigrant Invasions Imperil Our Country and Civilization is a 2001 book by the paleoconservative commentator Patrick J. Buchanan. In his book, Patrick J. Buchanan argues that Western culture will soon be imperiled.

== Summary ==
The title of the book is a reference to Oswald Spengler's book Decline of the West. Buchanan argues that the culture that produced western civilization as it has traditionally been understood is in its death throes in the United States because by the year 2050, the United States will cease to be a western country. He uses United Nations population statistics to analyze the recent trends in global populations, especially the major declines in the populations of European nations and the major increases in the populations of Asia, Africa, and Latin America.

Buchanan argues that the United States already has a "nation within a nation". The population of 30 million foreign-born people (of which 11 million are "illegal aliens") is larger than the entire populations of Rhode Island, Massachusetts, and Connecticut combined.

Buchanan argues that the "counter culture" of the 1960s has become the dominant culture, and he also argues that the counter culture aims to rewrite American history and dismantle its heritage. In his opinion, this culture is a hostile culture because it regards western civilization with antipathy: "A new generation has now grown up for whom the cultural revolution is not a revolution at all, but the culture they were born into and have known all their lives." He sees the new culture as being aggressive and inexorable towards those of traditional beliefs and determined to impose political correctness.

Since the 1960s, he writes, an "adversary culture" that set about "dynamiting" America's history and "demolishing" her heroes has arisen. With its media collaborators, the counterculture has rarely left an institution unscarred and it has rarely left a hero unsullied. The Americans feebly fend off "the relentless pounding of the artillery of an adversary culture that accepts no armistice."

The "pounding" of history begins with Columbus and one chapter is devoted to him, titled "Good-bye, Columbus." The discovery of America used to be one of the greatest events in world history, beginning the American history books. Today, Columbus is accused of perpetrating the "rape of paradise," setting off the legacy of slavery, racism, genocide, ecocide, exploitation and shame that goes on until today. The UN canceled its Columbus Day celebration and California University changed Columbus Day to Indigenous Peoples Day. By 2000, "diabolized" as an irredeemable racist murderer, Columbus made "Hitler look like a juvenile delinquent."

New textbooks which propagated the New History were published. The Wright brothers and the 1969 moon landing were both omitted from them. Instead, the new textbooks introduced readers to the wealth of the Mali Empire and its achievements and grandeur during the reign of Mansa Musa. The new textbooks described the achievements of the Aztecs in great detail but they did not contain any information about their conquests and their sacrifices of captives to Huitzilopotchli. Instead, the new textbooks portrayed Cortes's conquest of the Aztecs as a genocide which was committed against a peace-loving people. The use of the term "cultural genocide" puzzles Buchanan because indigenous American peoples practiced cannibalism and none of them invented the wheel.

Buchanan comments on slavery: "Had it not been for the West, African rulers would still be trafficking in the flesh of their kinsmen. Slaves, after all, were the leading cash crop of the friends of Mansa Musa."

The "war on America's past and the dumbing down of American children—to make their minds empty vessels into which the New History may be poured—is succeeding," he comments. Academic careers of the defenders of the Western history and heritage are ruined while those of the destroyers succeed spectacularly.

Buchanan confirms the latter argument by quoting John H. Wallace and Susan Sontag. The former made a career out of attacking Huckleberry Finn by portraying it as a piece of "racist trash." Any teacher who is caught trying to give it to children "should be fired on the spot as racist" or at best, he or she should be considered insensitive. Hemingway and many other notable writers regarded Huckleberry Finn as a literary classic but who are they to contradict John H. Wallace?

Buchanan also quotes Susan Sontag: "The white race is the cancer of human history; it is the white race and it alone—its ideologies and inventions—which eradicates autonomous civilizations wherever it spreads…" He comments: "Rewrite that sentence with 'Jewish race' in place of 'white race' and the passage would fit nicely into Mein Kampf." Had Sontag so savaged the Jewish people, her career would have ended there. But her diatribe against the white race did not diminish her standing and subsequently, she won a MacArthur Foundation genius award and according to the results of one recent survey, she is the most respectful intellectual of our time.

Buchanan also argues that the decline of the Christian faith is the primary cause of low birth rates, hopelessness, and political utopianism. He cites examples of anti-Christian sentiment such as negative reactions to Catholic films and the triumphant attitude of secularism. According to Buchanan, "Western Man has decided he can disobey God without consequence and become his own God." And at the same time: "The new hedonism seems unable to give people a reason to go on living." He depicts the United States as a country with a culture which is being demolished by the counterculture, and as a result, scarcely a trace of the traditional system of thought is left.

== Reception ==
Kirkus Reviews called it "[s]hameless, embarrassing rantings" and also remarked that "[l]ittle attests to the moral health of this nation more than the fact that it’s made a mockery of Buchanan's presidential ambitions time and again." The review particularly criticized Buchanan's claim that "[h]ad it not been for the West, African rulers would still be trafficking in the flesh of their kinsmen" as an example of dishonest historical revisionism.

Jonah Goldberg of the National Review:

First, let me say I both admire and dislike Buchanan's writing for the same reason: He brilliantly manages to do with one language what Yassir Arafat does with two. He offers red meat to the extremists while at the same giving himself the wiggle room to deny he said anything controversial in the first place. This is no mean feat.

The book's premise has been linked to the concept of Eurabia retrospectively by historian Niall Ferguson and by Voice of America. Buchanan's follow-up book State of Emergency made the Eurabia-association explicit.

== See also ==
- America Alone
- Churchill, Hitler and the Unnecessary War
- Criticism of multiculturalism
- Eurabia
- Frankfurt School
- Germany Abolishes Itself (2010)
- Great Replacement
- Le Suicide français (2014)
- Opposition to immigration
- We Are Doomed
- White genocide conspiracy theory
