= Adam Capay =

Adam Capay is a Lac Seul First Nation man who was charged with first degree murder for the 2012 death of Sherman Quisses. At the time both men were inmates at Thunder Bay Correctional Centre in Thunder Bay, Ontario in Canada. Capay was later released from prison.

Capay was 19 years old at the time of the incident and Quisees was 34. Capay allegedly stabbed Quisees to death during a prison altercation.

== Imprisonment and release ==
While awaiting trial, Capay served approximately four and a half years in solitary confinement. During this confinement, Capay spent time in a plexiglass cell with constant glaring lights. His lawyers later argued that these conditions constituted cruel and unusual punishment on a legal motion they brought to stay the charges.

In Thunder Bay, Justice John S. Fregeau stayed the charges against Capay, ruling that the violation of Capay's rights under the Canadian Charter of Rights and Freedoms outweighed the government charges. The Government of Ontario did not appeal Fregeau's decision. Capay was released from prison on January 29, 2019, now 26 years old.
