= Ontario Human Rights Commission =

Human Rights agency of the Canadian province of Ontario

- French: Commission ontarienne des droits de la personne
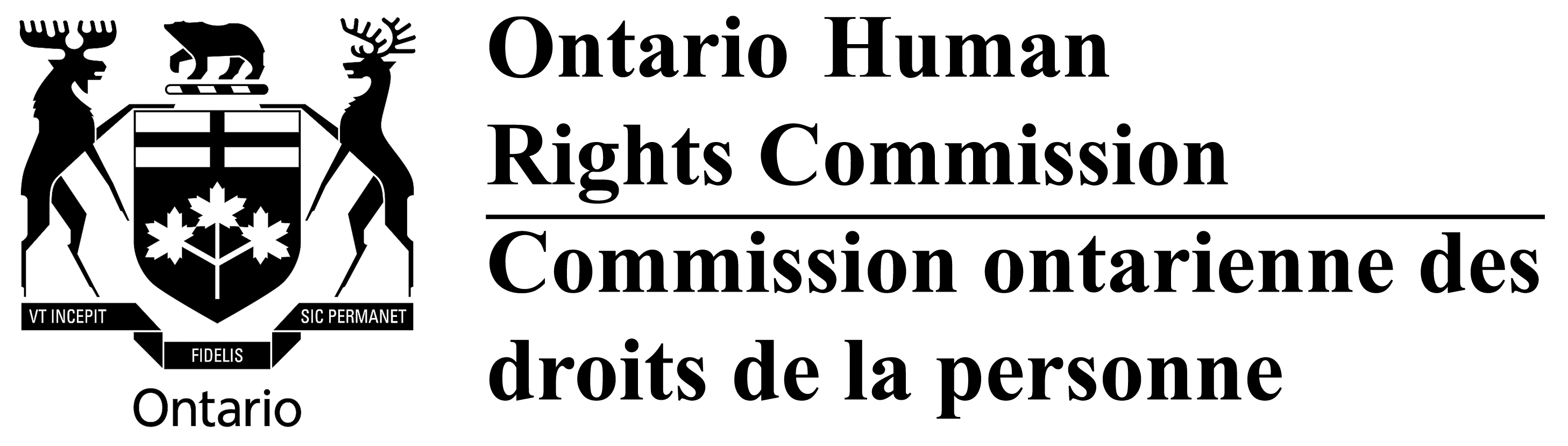

Agency overview
- Formed: March 29, 1961
- Preceding agency: Ontario Anti-Discrimination Commission
- Type: Crown agency
- Jurisdiction: Government of Ontario
- Headquarters: 180 Dundas Street West 9th Floor Toronto, Ontario M7A 2G5
- Minister responsible: Doug Downey, Attorney General
- Agency executive: Patricia DeGuire, Chief Commissioner
- Key document: Ontario Human Rights Code
- Website: ohrc.on.ca/en

The Ontario Human Rights Commission (OHRC) is an arm's length Crown agency of the Canadian province of Ontario responsible for administering the Ontario Human Rights Code. The OHRC reports to the legislature through the Attorney General of Ontario.

Established in 1961, the OHRC's statutory mandate under the Code is to "promote, protect and advance respect for human rights, and to identify and promote the elimination of discriminatory practices." A full-time chief commissioner and a varying number of part-time commissioners are appointed by Order in Council. Staff of the OHRC is appointed under the Public Service of Ontario Act, 2006.

== History ==
Since June 30, 2008, all new complaints of discrimination are filed as applications with the Human Rights Tribunal of Ontario (HRTO). However, OHRC has the right to be informed of applications before the HRTO, and receives copies of all applications and responses. The OHRC can intervene in any application with the consent of the applicant; the commission can also ask to intervene without the applicant's consent, subject to any directions or terms that the HRTO sets after hearing from the parties. The commission also has the right to bring its own application to the HRTO if the commission is of the opinion that the application is in the public interest.

=== Proposal for a national press council (2009) ===
In February 2009, in a report to the Canadian Human Rights Commission, the OHRC commented on the proposal to create a "National Press Council" that would serve as a national media watchdog. Unlike current press councils in Canada, membership to this proposed new council would have been required by all publishers, webmasters and radio and television producers. No other steps were taken to implement the proposal.

Commissioner Barbara Hall argued that a National Press Council would facilitate the protection of human rights without imposing censorship of the media, explaining that while the council duties would be limited to accepting complaints of discrimination (in particular, from what Hall described as "vulnerable groups") and requiring media outlets to publish counterarguments. However, the council would have no authority to censor media outlets.

Mary Agnes Welch, president of the Canadian Association of Journalists, stated that the current provincial press councils are "the only real place that readers can go to complain about stories short of the courts" but that they "are largely toothless and ineffective." However, she argued against a mandatory national press council, stating that:

The provincial ones don't even work, so how could we have a national one? And I know a lot of journalists who would take umbrage at essentially being in a federally regulated profession.... If on the crazy off-chance that there is some momentum behind this idea of a national press council, it won't be coming from journalists.

In an editorial, National Post strongly opposed the OHRC's proposal, arguing that a mandatory national press council "is merely the first step toward letting the Barbara Halls of the world decide what you get to hear, see and read." The Post further argued that nobody "has the ability to judge which speech should be free and which not." Barbara Kay also strongly opposed Hall's suggestion, stating that her experience with the Quebec Press Council (QPC) was evidence that press councils are abused by those wishing to suppress the discussion of sensitive or controversial issues.

In a speech to Ontario's Standing Committee on Government Agencies, Conservative author Mark Steyn criticized the proposal for a press council, arguing that “Free societies should not be in the business of criminalizing opinion.”

=== Report on the Toronto Police Service and racial profiling (2018) ===
In November 2018 the OHRC published its "Interim report on the inquiry into racial profiling and racial discrimination of Black persons by the Toronto Police Service". The first introductory paragraph of the report reads: "Between 2013 and 2017, a Black person in Toronto was nearly 20 times more likely than a White person to be involved in a fatal shooting by the Toronto Police Service (TPS). Despite making up only 8.8% of Toronto’s population, data obtained by the Ontario Human Rights Commission (OHRC) from the Special Investigations Unit (SIU) shows that Black people were over-represented in use of force cases (28.8%), shootings (36%), deadly encounters (61.5%) and fatal shootings (70%).

Black men make up 4.1% of Toronto’s population, yet were complainants in a quarter of SIU cases alleging sexual assault by TPS officers." The report was an effort to rebuild trust between a significant segment of Toronto society and its police services. Reactions to the report by the black community were skeptical, with University of Toronto sociology professor Akwasi Owusu-Bempah stating "I'm not certain that this administration is ready to deal fully with some of the issues related to race and policing".

=== Right to Read inquiry report (2022) ===
In 2019, the OHRC started an inquiry into human rights issues that affect students with reading disabilities in Ontario’s public education system. The resulting report was published in 2022, titled "Right to Read inquiry report" investigated early reading skills. It found that the publication education system in Ontario was failing its students (both those with and without reading disabilities) not using evidence-based approaches when teaching them to read. Specifically, the report highlighted that 26% of all Grade 3 students and 19% of all Grade 6 students did not meet provincial standards for reading (with worse results for students in special education).

The report prompted changes in Ontario's early reading curriculum, with Nova Scotia, Alberta and New Brunswick also changing their curriculum shortly after. This marked a shift away from the "balanced literacy" approach using cueing systems which teaches to read "by guessing and [predicting] what words are going to be". Previously the Ontario curriculum was "rooted in a whole language philosophy which suggests that by immersing children in spoken and written language, they will discover how to read." One major recommendation from the report was to instead move to an evidence-based curriculum based on phonics.

== Chairs and chief commissioners ==
=== Chair ===
- Louis Fine (1962–1971) (Note: Fine was the first Chair of the Ontario Human Rights Commission. He had been the chair of the OHRC's predecessor, the Ontario Anti-Discrimination Commission.)
- Daniel G. Hill (1971–1973) (Note: Hill was the OHRC's first Director. He was appointed on April 3, 1962.)
- Walter Currie (educator) (interim) (1974–1975)
- Thomas Symons (1975–1978)
- Dorothea Crittenden (1978–1982)
- Borden Purcell (1982–1988)
- Raj Anand (1988–1989) (Note: First person to use title of Chief Commissioner - even though the position title was not changed in the Human Rights Code until the Human Rights Amendment Code, 2006, took effect.)
- Fran Endicott (Sep 1992–Nov 1992)
- Catherine Frazee (1989–1992)
- Alok Mukherjee (interim) (November 1992–June 1993)
- Rosemary Brown (1993–1996)
- Keith Norton (1996–2005)

=== Chief commissioner ===
- Barbara Hall (November 2005–February 2015) (Note: title changed from Chair to Chief Commissioner - when the Human Rights Amendment Act, 2006, took effect - section 27(5) of the Code.)
- Ruth Goba (interim) (February–October 2015)
- Renu Mandhane (November 2015–May 2020)
- Ena Chadha (interim) (July 2020 – August 2021)
- Patricia DeGuire (August 2021 – Present)

== See also ==
- Ontario Human Rights Code
- Human Rights in Canada
- Canadian Human Rights Act
- Court of Appeal for Ontario
- Supreme Court of Canada
- Human rights complaints against Maclean's magazine
