= Canadian Human Rights Commission =

Canadian human rights authority

- Official logo of the Commission
- Formation: 1977
- Headquarters: Ottawa, Ontario
- Region served: Canada
- Chief Commissioner: Charlotte-Anne Malischewski (Interim)
- Parent organization: Government of Canada
- Website: https://www.chrc-ccdp.gc.ca/en

The Canadian Human Rights Commission (CHRC; French: Commission canadienne des droits de la personne, CCDP) was established in 1977 by the Government of Canada. It is empowered under the Canadian Human Rights Act to investigate and to try to settle complaints of discrimination in employment and in the provision of services within federal jurisdiction. The CHRC is also empowered under the Employment Equity Act to ensure that federally-regulated employers provide equal opportunities for four designated groups: women, Aboriginal people, disabled people, and visible minorities. One member of the Commission is designated as the Accessibility Commissioner under the Accessible Canada Act. The Commission helps enforce those human rights and inform the general public and employers of those rights.

== Organization and structure ==
The Canadian Human Rights Commission was established by Parliament in 1977 to administer the Canadian Human Rights Act. Its role was later expanded to include the Employment Equity Act.

Both laws apply to federally-regulated organizations, which include federal government departments and agencies; Crown corporations; and private sector organizations such as banks, airlines, and transportation and telecommunication companies.

The Commission consists of the Chief Commissioner, a Deputy Chief Commissioner, the Accessibility Commissioner, the Pay Equity Commissioner, and between three and six other members. All are appointed by the federal Cabinet. Under the Canadian Human Rights Act, the Commission protects the human rights of all individuals lawfully present in Canada. It promotes a vision for Canada in which all individuals have equal opportunity and can live their lives free from discrimination.

The Commission is responsible for dealing with allegations of discrimination. By law, it is bound to screen every discrimination complaint that it receives. When possible, the Commission encourages people to try to solve their disputes informally.

If people are unable to solve the matter themselves, then the Commission may conduct an investigation. If it believes the complaint has merit, the Commission may send it to the Canadian Human Rights Tribunal for further examination. Otherwise, the complaint is dismissed.

In some instances, the Commission can also appear before the Tribunal. That occurs when the Commission feels that the complaint deals with a matter of public interest, which includes decisions that have the potential to clarify, influence, shape, or define human rights law in Canada.

Under the Employment Equity Act, the Commission promotes equality in the workplace for the four designated groups: women, Aboriginal peoples, persons with disabilities, and members of visible minorities. It works with employers to ensure that no person is denied employment opportunities or benefits for reasons unrelated to their abilities. To that end, the Commission conducts compliance audits to help employers meet the requirements of the Act.

One member of the Commission is designated as the Accessibility Commissioner, responsible for the administration of the Accessible Canada Act.

== History ==
While the Employment Equity Act uses the language "visible minorities", in its 2022 annual report, the Commission stated that in its opinion, this is an "antiquated term". The Commission instead uses the term "racialized groups".

The 44th Parliament of Canada debated from 30 May 2024 Bill C-63, that would become the Online Harms Act. It stood with Minister of Justice Arif Virani's support. Under this putative legislation the CHRC would be the adjudicator. Advance copies had been seen by law firms as of February 2024; the CHRC would be granted discretion to fine individuals up to $50,000.

On the basis of a recommendation from Virani in June 2024 the federal Cabinet appointed a Muslim and a person of colour Birju Dattani to serve as Chief Commissioner, a post that had been vacant for more than 18 months. He had provided information about his activities to civil servants however Virani's office said that had not passed up the chain to them. Jewish groups raised concerns about social media posts by an individual so-called 'Mujahid Dattani'. In 2015 Dattani had shared the stage while in the UK with members of the Islamic fundamentalist Hizb-ut-tahrir group, "that seeks to establish a new caliphate" under sharia law "and opposes Israel's existence." The PMO had neither seen nor heard of the complaint, while a Liberal Member of Parliament, Marco Mendicino said that "there are significant deficiencies" in the hiring process. He continued: "A rigorous vetting process is required so that the public can have the utmost confidence in the chair and the CHRC as a protectorate of human rights in our democracy." On August 12, 2024 the independent law firm report commissioned by Virani into the appointment of Dattani was published, and Dattani withdrew his candidacy.

== Controversies ==
=== Skin colour biases (2020) ===
In October 2020, nine employees of the CHRC filed grievances through their unions alleging discrimination on the basis of skin colour. In March 2023, the Treasury Board of Canada Secretariat concluded that the CHRC "had discriminated against its Black and racialized employees."

=== Senate report (2023) ===
In December 2023, the Senate of Canada's Standing Committee on Human Rights published a report titled "Anti-Black Racism, Sexism and Systemic Discrimination in the Canadian Human Rights Commission" and called on the federal government to commence an independent review of working conditions for "Black, Indigenous and racialized employees" at the CHRC, and of Canada's human rights laws.

== Relationship to Related Legislation ==
Under the leadership of the Pay Equity Commissioner, the Commission is also responsible for the administration and enforcement of the Pay Equity Act (PEA) and the Accessible Canada Act (ACA).

== Leadership ==
- Marie-Claude Landry March 2015-November 2022
- Charlotte-Anne Malischewski (Interim) December 2022-present

== See also ==
- Section 13 of the Canadian Human Rights Act
- Human Rights Commission
- Human Rights in Canada
