= Human Rights Code (British Columbia) =

Provincial law

The Human Rights Code is a provincial law in the province of British Columbia, Canada that gives all people equal rights and opportunities without discrimination in specific areas such as jobs, housing and services. The code's goal is to prevent discrimination and harassment because of race, colour, sex, gender identity or expression, sexual orientation, disability, creed, age and other grounds.

== History ==
The Code was enacted in 1973. Before that date, various laws dealt with different kinds of discrimination. The code brought them together into one law and added some new protections.

== Administration ==
The British Columbia Human Rights Tribunal is the administrative, quasi-judicial tribunal tasked with hearing complaints that the Code has been violated. It has the power to grant damages and specific performance to remedy discriminatory acts. The BCHRT is subject to judicial review by the Supreme Court of British Columbia.

== Application ==
The Code does not apply to federally-regulated activities, such as aeronautics and telecommunications. They are subject to the Canadian Human Rights Act.

== See also ==
- Canadian Human Rights Act
- Ontario Human Rights Code
- Quebec Charter of Human Rights and Freedoms
- Saskatchewan Bill of Rights
- Human rights in Canada
