= Human Rights Code (Ontario) =

Ontario, Canada statute

Legislative Assembly of Ontario
- Long title: An Act to establish the Ontario Code of Human Rights and to provide for its Administration
- Citation: R.S.O. 1990, c. H.19
- Territorial extent: Ontario
- Enacted by: Legislative Assembly of Ontario
- Commenced: June 15, 1962

Keywords
- Human rights, anti-discrimination law
- Status: Current legislation

The Human Rights Code (French: Code des droits de la personne) is a statute in the Canadian province of Ontario that guarantees equality before the law and prohibits discrimination in specific social areas such as housing or employment. The code's goal specifically prohibits discrimination based on race, colour, gender identity or expression, sex, sexual orientation, disability, creed, age and other grounds. The code is administered by the Ontario Human Rights Commission and enforced by the Human Rights Tribunal of Ontario.

== History ==
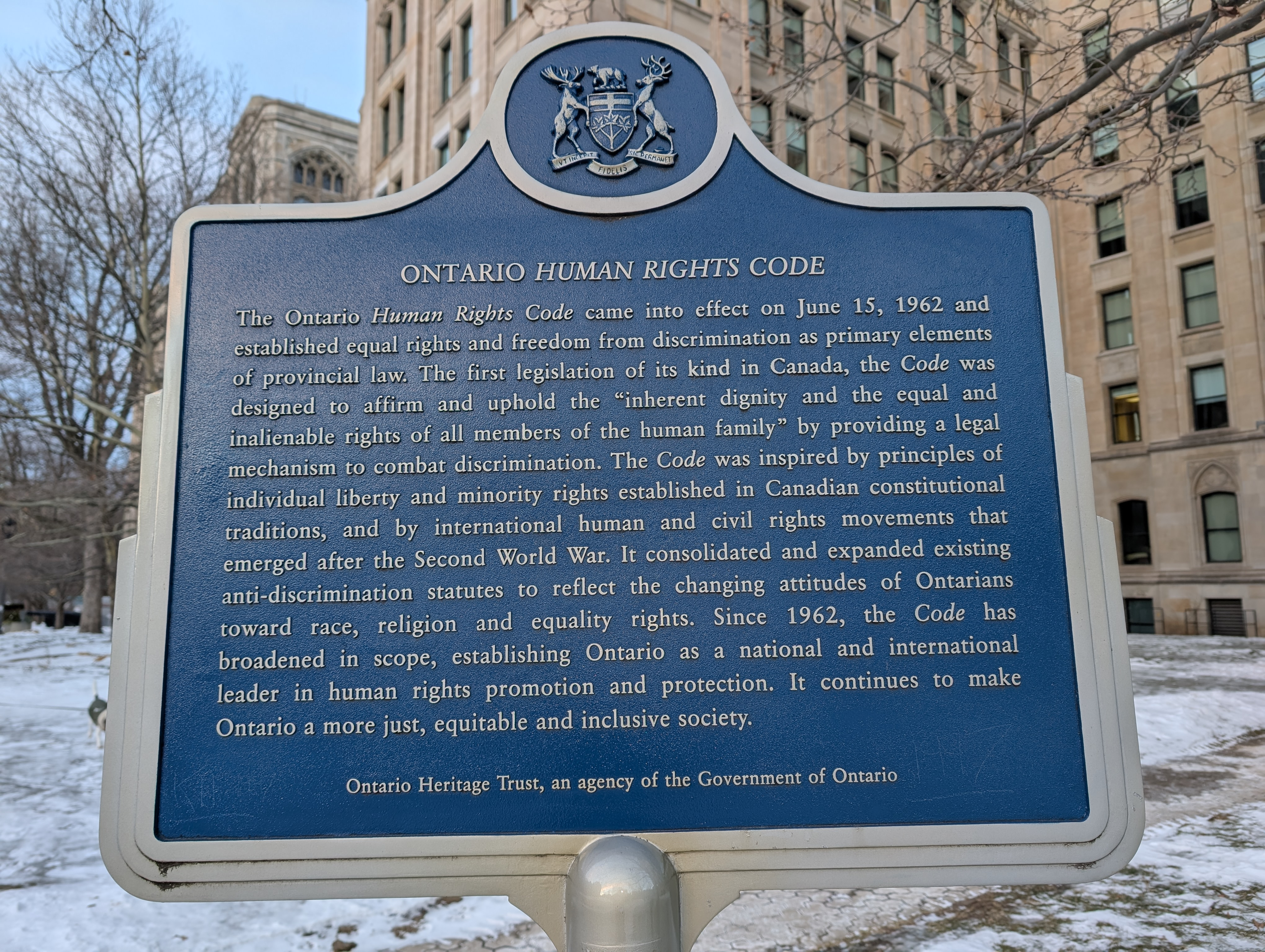
Commemorative plaque in Toronto

The Human Rights Code was the first law of its kind in Canada. It replaced various laws that dealt with different kinds of discrimination. The code brought them together into one law and added some new protections. The code came into force on June 15, 1962. June 15 was chosen as the proclamation date for the code because it was the 747th anniversary of the signing of the Magna Carta.

The code replaced the province's existing anti-discrimination legislation, including:

- Fair Employment Practices Act, 1951 which prohibited discrimination based on race and religion in employment;
- Female Employee's Fair Remuneration Act, 1951 which prohibited an employer from paying a female employee less money for the same work done by a man in the same establishment
- Fair Accommodation Practices Act, 1954 which prohibited discrimination in public places on racial, religious or ethnic grounds;
- Ontario Anti-Discrimination Commission Act, 1958 which created a commission to administer the above acts and develop educational programs;

At the same time that the Ontario Human Rights Commission was created, the government of the day, led by Premier Leslie Frost introduced an amendment to the Fair Accommodation Practices Act to prohibit discrimination because of race, colour or creed in the renting of apartments in buildings which contain more than six units.

The Human Rights Commission led an extensive review of the Code in the mid-1970s, culminating in a report titled Life Together: A Report on Human Rights in Ontario. Some of the report's recommendations were adopted in the Ontario Human Rights Code, 1981, which passed in December 1981.

== Grounds ==
The code prohibits discrimination on the grounds of race, ancestry, place of origin, colour, ethnic origin, citizenship, creed, sex, sexual orientation, gender identity and expression, age, marital status, family status, disability, the receipt of public assistance (housing only), record of offences (employment only), or by association with a person identified by any of those grounds.

The most recent amendment to this list was on June 19, 2012, to add gender identity and gender expression to the list of prohibited grounds.

== Administration ==
The Human Rights Tribunal of Ontario (HRTO) is the administrative, quasi-judicial tribunal tasked with hearing complaints that the code has been violated. It has the power to grant damages and specific performance to remedy discriminatory acts. The HRTO is subject to judicial review by the Divisional Court of the Ontario Superior Court of Justice.

Before June 30, 2008, human rights complaints were filed with the Ontario Human Rights Commission (OHRC), which investigated claims of discrimination. Since June 30, 2008, claims of discrimination are filed directly with the HRTO, leaving the OHRC to concentrate its resources on systemic discrimination, public education and policy development.

== Content ==
The code is divided into an introductory section, or "preamble", followed by seven parts.

- Part I sets out basic rights and responsibilities.
- Part II explains how the code is interpreted and applied.
- Part III explains the role and structure of the Ontario Human Rights Commission (OHRC).
- Part IV explains the role and structure of the Human Rights Tribunal of Ontario (HRTO).
- Part IV.1 establishes the Human Rights Legal Support Centre (HRLSC) and sets out its governance.
- Part V deals with general matters such as the power to make regulations and sets out that the Human Rights Code has primacy over other provincial legislation (section 47(2)).
- Part VI of the code deals with the transition from the "old" system, where complaints were investigated by the Ontario Human Rights Commission to the "new" system (which took effect on June 30, 2008) where applications are now filed directly with the Human Rights Tribunal of Ontario without any investigation.

== Application ==
The code does not apply to federally regulated activities, such as banking, intra-provincial transportation, aeronautics and telecommunications, which are subject to the Canadian Human Rights Act. According to HRTO adjudicator, the Code only protects people with protected grounds from not being discriminated. The victim has the burden to prove the discrimination is due to his/her protected grounds.

== See also ==
- Human Rights Legal Support Centre
- Ontario Human Rights Commission
- Human Rights Tribunal of Ontario
- Canadian Human Rights Act
- Human Rights Code (British Columbia)
- Quebec Charter of Human Rights and Freedoms
- Saskatchewan Bill of Rights
- Human rights in Canada
