= Canadian Human Rights Act =

Canadian federal statute protecting human rights

Parliament of Canada
- Long title: An Act to extend the laws in Canada that proscribe discrimination
- Citation: RSC 1985, c. H-6
- Enacted by: Parliament of Canada
- Assented to: 1977

The Canadian Human Rights Act (French: Loi canadienne sur les droits de la personne) is a statute passed by the Parliament of Canada in 1977 with the express goal of extending the law to ensure equal opportunity to individuals who may be victims of discriminatory practices based on a set of prohibited grounds. The prohibited grounds currently are: race, national or ethnic origin, colour, religion, age, sex, sexual orientation, gender identity or expression, marital status, family status, genetic characteristics, disability, and conviction for an offence for which a pardon has been granted or in respect of which a record suspension has been ordered. Before the act was enacted, all ten provinces had enacted their own anti-discrimination laws, beginning with the Ontario Racial Discrimination Act in 1944, and the Saskatchewan Bill of Rights in 1947.

== Application ==
The act applies throughout Canada, but only to federally regulated activities; each province and territory has its own anti-discrimination law that applies to activities that are not federally regulated. The Canadian Human Rights Act created the Canadian Human Rights Commission that investigates claims of discrimination as well as the Canadian Human Rights Tribunal to judge the cases. Before a case can be brought to the Tribunal it must go through several stages of investigation and remediation by the Commission. After this process has been completed, if the parties are not satisfied, the case will go to the tribunal.

If a complainant can show a valid case of discrimination the defendant can rebuke it by showing that their practice was for a justified reason. The process is generally known as the "Meiorin test" which is similar to the Oakes test justification in a Charter challenge. In 2018, the Supreme Court of Canada found that the Canadian Human Rights Tribunal's determination that the Indian Act did not violate the Canadian Human Rights Act was reasonable due to judicial deference.

== Specific provisions ==
=== Gender identity and expression ===
In 2016, the government of Prime Minister Justin Trudeau introduced An Act to amend the Canadian Human Rights Act and the Criminal Code (C-16) in the House of Commons of Canada, to add and include "gender identity or expression" to the legislation. The bill passed the Commons on November 18, 2016, and the Senate on June 15, 2017. It received royal assent on June 19, 2017. The law went into effect immediately.

=== Hate messages ===
The Canadian Human Rights Act formerly had a provision, section 13, dealing with communication of hate messages. The provision was repealed by the Parliament of Canada in June 2013, with the repeal coming into force one year later.

== See also ==
- List of anti-discrimination acts
- Human rights in Canada
- Human rights complaints against Maclean's magazine
- Censorship in Canada
- Hate speech laws in Canada
- Canadian Charter of Rights and Freedoms
- Canadian Bill of Rights
- Canadian Human Rights Commission
- Employment equity (Canada)
- Equal pay for women
- Veterans' Bill of Rights
- Ontario Human Rights Code
- Quebec Charter of Human Rights and Freedoms
