= Legal aspects of workplace bullying =

The law for workplace bullying is given below for each country in detail. Further European countries with concrete antibullying legislation are Belgium, France, and The Netherlands.

== Australia ==
Each state has its own legislation.

In Queensland, legislation comes from Workplace Health and Safety Queensland. If bullying (referred to as 'Workplace Harassment' in the Queensland subordinate legislation) endangers a worker's health causing stress or any other physical harm, an obligation holders under the 'Workplace Health and Safety Act, 1995' can be found liable for not providing a safe place for their employees to work. Queensland is one of only two States in Australia with a Code of Practice specifically for workplace bullying – 'The Prevention of Workplace Harassment Code of Practice, 2004' In Victoria, legislation comes from Worksafe Victoria. If bullying endangers a worker's health causing stress or any other physical harm, a corporation can be found liable for not providing a safe place for their employees to work.

== Canada ==
=== Quebec ===
The Canadian Province of Quebec passed legislation addressing workplace bullying on 1 June 2004. In its act representing labour standards, "psychological harassment" is prohibited. The Commission des normes du travail is the organization responsible for the application of this act.

=== Ontario ===
Under the Ontario Occupational Health and Safety Act 1979, all employers "take every precaution reasonable in the circumstances for the protection of a worker". This includes protecting them against the risk of workplace violence. The Act requires establishment of Joint Occupational Health and Safety Committees for larger employers.

Under the act, workplace violence is defined as "...the attempted or actual exercise of any intentional physical force that causes or may cause physical injury to a worker. It also includes any threats which give a worker reasonable grounds to believe he or she is at risk of physical injury". Currently, as the Act is written, the Ontario Occupational Health and Safety Act does not specifically cover the issue of psychological harassment.

On 13 December 2007, MPP Andrea Horwath introduced for first reading a new Bill, Bill-29, to make an amendment to the Ontario Occupational Health and Safety Act. This Bill-29 is proposing "to protect workers from harassment and violence in the workplace" and will include protection from psychological abuse and bullying behaviors in the workplace in Ontario.

The Ontario OHS Act has been amended to include Bill 168, which came into force 15 June 2010. The amendment includes the protection of employees from psychological harassment, workplace violence, including domestic violence in the workplace.

=== Saskatchewan ===
The Canadian Province of Saskatchewan made workplace bullying illegal in 2007 by passing The Occupational Health and Safety (Harassment Prevention) Amendment Act, 2007. The act broadened the definition of harassment, as defined in The Occupational Health and Safety Act 1993, to include psychological harassment.

=== Manitoba ===
Manitoba enacted Bill 18 making bullying illegal and legitimized school "bullying clubs", Including gay–straight alliances, and other school anti-bullying clubs. http://web2.gov.mb.ca/bills/40-2/b018e.php

== Ireland ==
In Republic of Ireland, there is a Code of Practice for employers and employees on the prevention and resolution of bullying at work. The Code notes the provision in the Safety, Health and Welfare Act 2005 requiring employers to manage work activities to prevent improper conduct or behaviour at work. The Code of Practice provides both employer and employee with the means and the machinery to identify and to stamp out bullying in the workplace in a way which benefits all sides.

== Spain ==
In Spain, within the public administration, activities including preventing access to opportunities, physical or social isolation, withholding necessary information, keeping the target out of the loop, ignoring or excluding, if permanent and for a long time, are considered labor harassment and have to be prosecuted.

== Sweden ==
Workplace bullying in Sweden is covered by the Ordinance of the Swedish National Board of Occupational Safety and Health containing Provisions on measures against Victimization at Work, which defines victimisation as "...recurrent reprehensible or distinctly negative actions which are directed against individual employees in an offensive manner and can result in those employees being placed outside the workplace community".

The act places the onus on employers to plan and organise work so as to prevent victimisation and to make it clear to employees that victimisation is not acceptable. The employer is also responsible for the early detection of signs of victimisation, prompt counter measures to deal with victimisation and making support available to employees who have been targeted.

== United Kingdom ==
In the United Kingdom, although bullying is not specifically mentioned in workplace legislation, there are means to obtain legal redress for bullying. The Protection from Harassment Act 1997 is a recent addition to the more traditional approaches using employment-only legislation. Notable cases include Majrowski v Guy's and St Thomas' NHS Trust wherein it was held that an employer is vicariously liable for one employee's harassment of another, and Green v DB Group Services (UK) Ltd, where a bullied worker was awarded over £800,000 in damages. In the latter case, at paragraph 99, the judge Mr Justice Owen said "I am satisfied that the behaviour amounted to a deliberate and concerted campaign of bullying within the ordinary meaning of that term."

Bullying behaviour breaches other UK laws. An implied term of every employment contract in the UK is that parties to the contract have a (legal) duty of trust and confidence to each other. Bullying, or an employer tolerating bullying, typically breaches that contractual term. Such a breach creates circumstances entitling an employee to terminate his or her contract of employment without notice, which can lead to a finding by an Employment Tribunal of unfair dismissal, colloquially called constructive dismissal. An employee bullied in response to asserting a statutory right can be compensated for the detriment under Part V of the Employment Rights Act 1996, and if dismissed, Part X of the same Act provides that the dismissal is automatically unfair. Where a person is bullied on grounds of sex, race or disability et al., it is outlawed under anti-discrimination laws.

It was argued, following the obiter comments of Lord Hoffmann in Johnson v Unisys Ltd in March 2001, that claims could be made before an Employment Tribunal for injury to feelings arising from unfair dismissal. It was re-established that this was not what the law provided, in Dunnachie v Kingston upon Hull City Council, July 2004 wherein the Lords confirmed that the position established in Norton Tool v Tewson in 1972, that compensation for unfair dismissal was limited to financial loss alone. The compensatory award element for "ordinary" unfair dismissal is subject to a statutory cap set, from February 2014, at the lower of £76574 or 12 months gross pay. Discriminatory dismissal continues to attract compensation for injury to feelings and financial loss, and there is no statutory cap.

Access to justice in the UK is via self-representation at a tribunal, via a no-win no-fee lawyer, or via insurance or trade union lawyers. Since the Access to Justice act, "collective conditional fees" have blurred the distinction causing controversy for example in the case of Unison v Jervis.

== United States ==
In the United States, comprehensive workplace bullying legislation has not been passed by the federal government or by any US state, but since 2003 many state legislatures have considered bills. As of April 2009, 16 US states have proposed legislation; these are:

- Nevada (2009)
- Illinois (2009)
- Utah (2009)
- New Jersey (2007)
- Washington (2007, 2005)
- New York (2006)
- Vermont (2007)
- Oregon (2007, 2005)
- Montana (2007)
- Connecticut (2007)
- Hawaii (2007, 2006, 2005, 2004)
- Oklahoma (2007, 2004)
- Kansas (2006)
- Missouri (2006)
- Massachusetts (2005)
- California (2003)

These workplace bullying bills would typically have allowed employees to sue their employers for creating an "abusive work environment", and most have been supported by the notion that laws against workplace bullying are necessary to protect public health. Many of the above bills are based upon the proposed Healthy Workplace Bill. This proposed bill contains several restrictive provisions not found in workplace anti-bully legislation adopted in other countries.

Despite the lack of any federal or state law specifically on workplace bullying, some targets of bullying have prevailed in lawsuits that allege alternative theories, such as Intentional Infliction of Emotional Distress and Assault.

Although most US states operate primarily under the doctrine of at-will employment (which, in theory, allows an employer to fire an employee for any reason or no reason at all), American workers have gained significant legal leverage through discrimination and harassment laws, workplace safety laws, union-protection laws. etc., such that it is illegal under federal and most states' laws to fire employees for many reasons. For example, these employment laws typically forbid retaliation for good faith complaints or the exercise of legal rights such as the right to organize a union. Discrimination and harassment laws enable employees to sue for creating a "hostile work environment", which can include bullying, but the bullying/hostility usually is tied in some way to a characteristic protected under the discrimination/harassment law, such as race, sex, religion, age, disability, sexual orientation, etc.

== South Korea ==
People can take legal action if specific action of workplace bullying is violated existing law or if it is recognized that laborer who is bullied in workplace suffer industrial accident, but generally it is hard to confirm whether it is illegal or not. Fundamentally, industrial accident can be approved when the accident have task correlation. However, it is hard to say that bullying is related with work. Besides bullying could be occurred in diverse places such as cafeteria, commuting bus, get -together so the task correlation is not likely to be approved. There is, however, a case about recognition of industrial accident related with workplace bullying. The court said that if laborer received treatment due to workplace bullying, it is an industrial accident and the person can take legal action.
