= Tomekichi Homma =

Japanese-Canadian advocate for voting rights

- Born: 1865; Japan
- Died: 1945 (aged 79–80)
- Known for: Advocate for equal voting rights

Tomekichi "Tomey" Homma (1865–1945) was a Canadian who was one of the first Japanese settlers of Steveston, which is now part of Richmond, British Columbia. He fought for the right to vote for Japanese-Canadians in provincial elections.

== Early life and work ==
Homma was born in Japan to a Samurai-caste family. He emigrated 1883 and settled in Steveston and was naturalized as a British subject in 1896 (until 1947, Canadians were classified as British subjects).

In Steveston, Homma was a labour organizer and founded the Japanese Fishermen's Benevolent Society. Homma was also a key figure in the construction of the first Japanese school and a fishermen's hospital in what is now Richmond; as well, he founded the first Japanese-language daily paper in Canada, the Canada Shinpo.

== Court case for voting rights ==
Homma also fought for Asian-Canadian suffrage. Because he was denied the right to vote because of his ethnicity, Homma took the province of British Columbia to court. Homma was successful at the County Court and the Supreme Court of British Columbia, which held that he was entitled to vote.

The government of British Columbia then appealed the case to the imperial Judicial Committee of the Privy Council in Britain, which at that time was the highest court in the Canadian legal system. The federal government intervened in support of Homma, arguing that as a naturalised Canadian, federal law ensured he could vote in all elections, the same as native-born Canadians.

In 1902, the Judicial Committee ruled against Homma, in its decision in Cunningham v Homma. The Judicial Committee determined that while the federal government was responsible for the naturalisation of citizens, the provinces had the right to legislate who could vote in provincial and municipal elections. Asian Canadians would not garner the right to vote until 1949, four years after Homma died.

== Internment and death ==
Homma was one of the many Japanese-Canadians interned during World War II. He died in a detention camp near Slocan, British Columbia.

== Recognition ==
Parks Canada has designated Homma's court case as being of National Historical Significance. In recognition of his contribution to the democratic system, in December 2017 the Government of Canada, through Parks Canada, dedicated a plaque in his honour at the Nikkei National Museum and Cultural Centre in Burnaby.

Tomekichi Homma Elementary School in Richmond is named in his honour.
