= Cunningham v Homma =

1902 Canadian constitutional law case

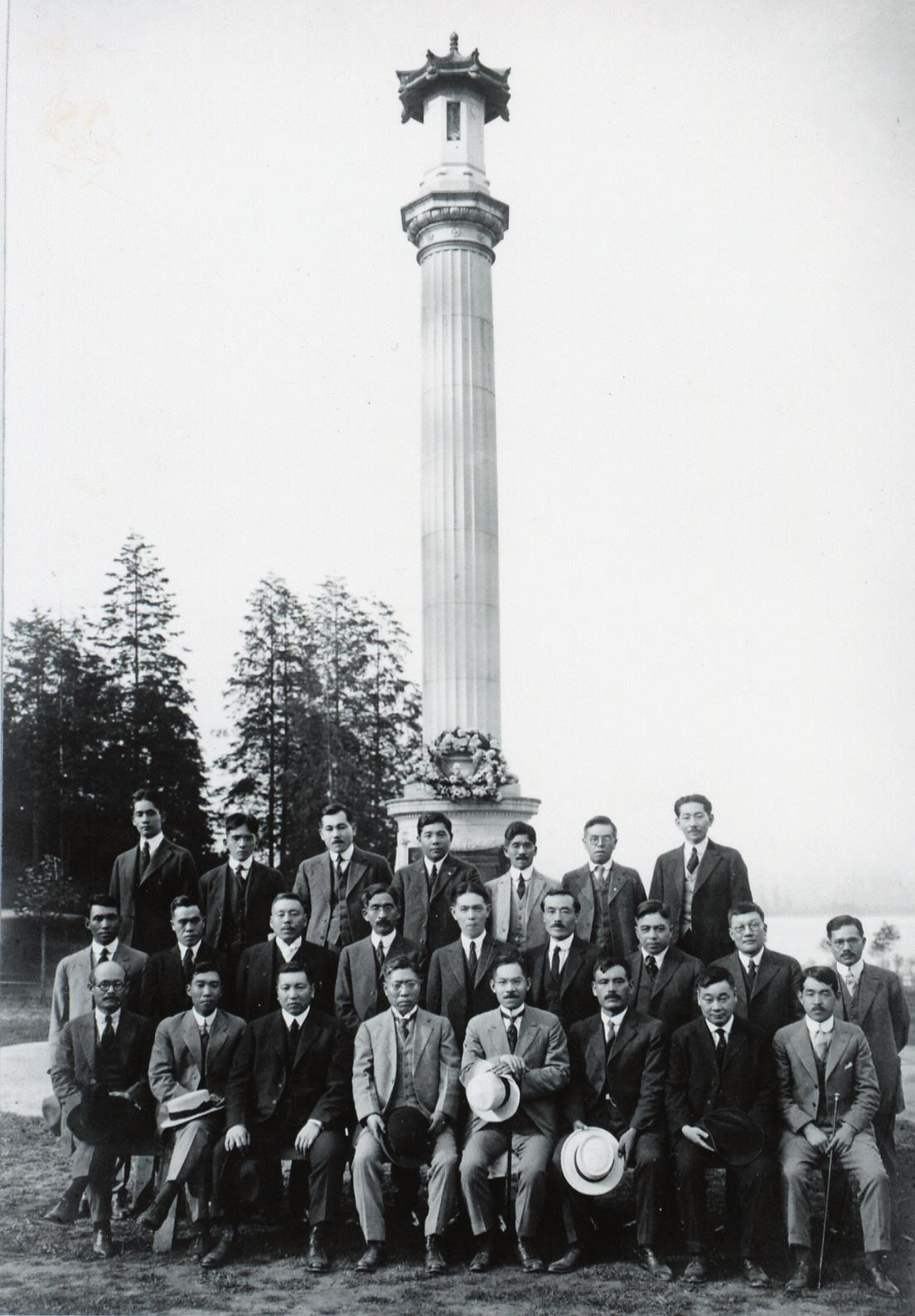
- Founding members of the Canadian Japanese Association
- Court: Judicial Committee of the Privy Council
- Full case name: The Collector of Voters for the Electoral District of Vancouver City and the Attorney General for the Province of British Columbia v Tomey Homma and the Attorney General for the Dominion of Canada
- Decided: 17 December 1902
- Citation: [1902] UKPC 60, [1903] 9 AC 151, CCS 45

Case history
- Appealed from: Supreme Court of British Columbia

Court membership
- Judges sitting: The Lord Chancellor, Lord Macnaghten, Lord Davey, Lord Robertson, Lord Lindley

Case opinions
- Decision by: The Lord Chancellor

Cunningham v Homma, is a decision of the Judicial Committee of the Privy Council that upheld a British Columbia law that prohibited Japanese Canadians and Chinese Canadians from voting in provincial elections.

The case originated with an attempt by Tomekichi Homma, a Japanese immigrant and naturalized Canadian, to register to vote in 1900. The registrar of voters, Thomas Cunningham, rejected Homma's application. Homma took the British Columbia government to court over the issue.

Homma was successful at the County Court and the Supreme Court of British Columbia However, the case ultimately made its way to the Judicial Committee of the Privy Council, which at that time was the highest court in the Canadian legal system. In Cunningham v Homma, the Privy Council ruled against Homma. The court determined that while the federal government had exclusive jurisdiction over the naturalization of citizens, the provinces had the right to legislate who could vote in provincial and municipal elections. There was no inherent right to vote for naturalized citizens. Provinces and their municipalities could determine who could vote, which meant they could bar any naturalized ethnic group they chose. Parks Canada has designated this case as being of National Historical Significance.

Asian Canadians would not garner the right to vote until 1949, four years after Homma died. In recognition of his contribution to the democratic system, in December 2017 the Government of Canada, through Parks Canada, dedicated a plaque in his honour at the Nikkei National Museum and Cultural Centre in Burnaby.

== See also ==
- Royal Commission on Chinese Immigration (1885)
- Chinese Immigration Act of 1885
- Vancouver anti-Chinese riots, 1886
- Chinese Immigration Act, 1923
- Anti-Oriental riots (Vancouver)
- List of Judicial Committee of the Privy Council cases
