= Saskatchewan Bill of Rights =

Saskatchewan law protecting human rights

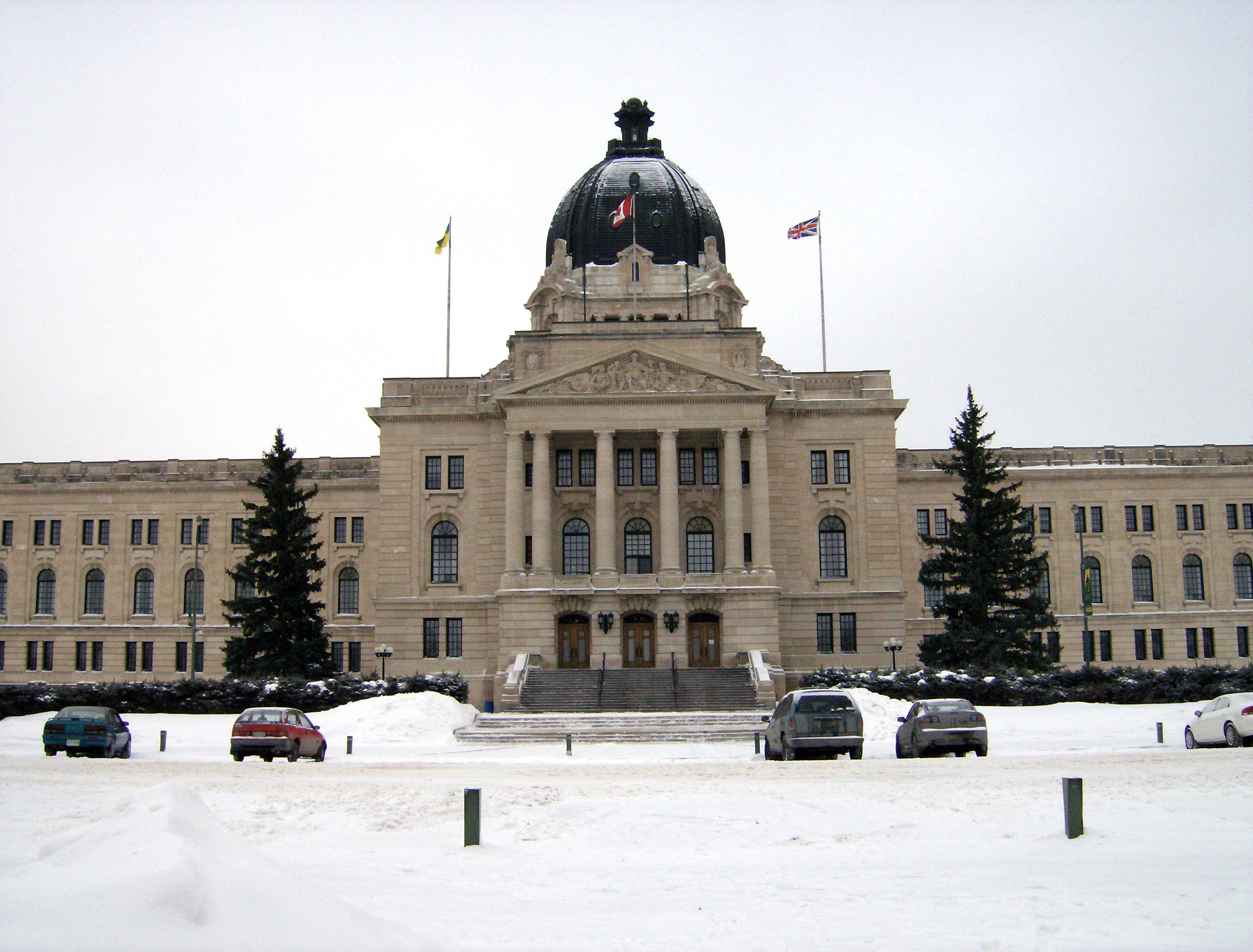

Legislative Assembly of Saskatchewan
- Long title: An Act to protect Certain Rights.
- Citation: 1978, c S-9
- Status: Repealed

The Saskatchewan Bill of Rights Act is a statute of the Canadian Province of Saskatchewan, first enacted by the provincial Legislature in 1947 and "Assented To" on April 1, 1947, and then "In Force" on May 1, 1947. It was the first bill of rights enacted in the Commonwealth of Nations since the original Bill of Rights enacted by the English Parliament in 1689. It was also the forerunner of modern human rights legislation in Canada.

The Bill of Rights continues to be in force, through incorporation into The Saskatchewan Human Rights Code, the current provincial statute protecting human rights.

== Provisions of the Saskatchewan Bill of Rights ==
=== Fundamental rights and freedoms ===
The first part of the Saskatchewan Bill of Rights set out fundamental rights and freedoms:

- right to freedom of conscience and religion (s. 3);
- right to free expression (s. 4);
- right to peaceable assembly and association (s. 5);
- right to freedom from arbitrary imprisonment and right to immediate judicial determination of a detention (s. 6);
- right to vote in provincial elections (s. 7).

=== Prohibitions on discrimination ===
The Bill of Rights also prohibited various types of discrimination, on the grounds of race, creed, religion, colour, or ethnic or national origin:

- right to employment without discrimination (s. 8);
- right to engage in occupations without discrimination (s. 9);
- right to own and occupy property without discrimination (s. 10);
- right of access to public places and facilities without discrimination (s. 11);
- right to membership in professional and trade associations without discrimination (s. 12);
- right to education without discrimination (s. 13).

=== Enforcement provisions ===
The Bill of Rights also contained enforcement provisions:

- advertisements indicating an intention to discriminate (e.g. a job advertisement which stated that members of a particular race or religion could not apply for a position) were prohibited (s. 14);
- refusal to comply with the rights and freedoms under the Bill (e.g. denying service to a person because of the person's race) was an offence, carrying a fine of between $25 and $50 for a first offence, and a fine of between $50 and $200 for subsequent offences, with the possibility of imprisonment for default in paying the fine (s. 15);
- injunctions could be obtained from the Court of King's Bench against anyone who attempted to deprive a person of rights under the Bill (s. 16);
- the provincial government was bound by the Bill, which could be enforced directly against the government in court (s. 17).

The Bill also stated that except as provided in the Bill itself, the enumeration of rights and freedoms in the Bill did not derogate from any rights, freedoms or liberties which anyone enjoyed by law (s. 18).

The Bill came into force on May 1, 1947 (s. 19).

== Incorporation into The Saskatchewan Human Rights Code ==
In 1979, Saskatchewan enacted The Saskatchewan Human Rights Code, which amalgamated several different statutes into one code, and provided a uniform enforcement process, through the Saskatchewan Human Rights Commission. The portion of the Saskatchewan Bill of Rights dealing with fundamental rights and freedoms was incorporated as the first part of the Code and continues in force. The provisions barring discrimination were incorporated into the Code as well.
