= Marc Lemire =

Canadian neo-Nazi (born 1975)

Marc Lemire (born 1975) is a Canadian white nationalist. He has worked closely with Paul Fromm, and was the webmaster of the Hamilton, Ontario-based Freedom-Site which he began in 1996. Formerly of Toronto and more recently living in Hamilton, Lemire was the last president of the Heritage Front organization from January 1, 2001, until the organization folded around 2005. He was employed as a network analyst in the IT department of the City of Hamilton, Ontario, from around 2005 until 2019, when he agreed to resign.

== Early career ==
In 1997, Lemire ran for school trustee in Toronto Public School Ward P17, but lost after receiving only 2,503 votes (or 12% of the total). In the mid-1990s he was a Canadian Armed Forces reservist. In their 1997 Annual Audit of Antisemitic Incidents. B'nai Brith Canada wrote, "Marc Lemire, webmaster of the Freedom-Site that hosts the websites of several of Canada’s most virulent antisemitic organizations such as the Heritage Front, The Canadian Patriots Network and the Citizens for Foreign Aid Reform". In 1998, the Canadian Broadcasting Corporation called The Canadian Patriots Network a "hate website".

Lemire's involvement with Wolfgang Droege and the neo-Nazi Heritage Front group began while he was a teenager in the early 1990s. When the Heritage Front fell into crisis around 1993, he attempted independent projects on the far right, such as his Canadian Patriots Network before embarking in his online activities. He resumed his activity with the Heritage Front within a few years, and according to the Heritage Front website, Lemire helped organize a Heritage Front flyer campaign in 2001. The flyers were titled in part Immigration can kill you, and claimed that there was a connection between immigration and an outbreak of tuberculosis.

Lemire was briefly a member of the Canadian Alliance, a mainstream conservative Canadian party — along with several other far-right figures, such as Paul Fromm, Doug Christie and Doug Collins — until late 2000 when, according to The Report newsmagazine, they were all expelled from the party.

== Legal and human rights issues ==
In August 2006, a Canadian Human Rights Tribunal found that postings by Craig Harrison on the Freedom-Site forum (an interactive message forum on Lemire's website) contained violations of Section 13 of the Canadian Human Rights Act. No liability was found against Lemire, although the Tribunal did issue a decision that "compelled" Lemire to provide evidence during the hearing. A total of eight people in Canada viewed the material.

A complaint was also laid against Lemire for allegedly "communicating and/or causing to be communicated" messages in violation of section 13 of the Canadian Human Rights Act. Hearings before the Canadian Human Rights Tribunal began February 2007.

On November 25, 2005, Lemire filed a Notice of Constitutional Question with every Attorney General in Canada, against the Canadian Human Rights Act, in which he challenged the constitutionality of sections 13 (Internet hate) and 54(1)(1.1) (Fines) of the Canadian Human Rights Act. Specifically he argued that they are in violation of ss. 2(a) and (b), 7, 26 and 31 of the Canadian Charter of Rights and Freedoms. A violation of ss. 1(d) and (f) of the Canadian Bill of Rights is also alleged. As a result of the constitutional challenge, the Canadian Free Speech League, the Canadian Association for Free Expression, the Attorney General of Canada, The Canadian Jewish Congress, B'nai Brith Canada and the Simon Wiesenthal Centre have all obtained "Interested Party Status" in the case.

In September 2009, the Canadian Human Rights Tribunal ruled that Section 13 of the Canada Human Rights Act violated the right to freedom of expression, and refused to impose a penalty on Lemire. However, as author of the decision Athanasios Hadjis is not a judge and the tribunal is not a court, the section remained in force and the ruling was not binding beyond the Lemire case.

Two previous decisions of the CHRT (first by a 2-member panel, and later by Chair Grant Sinclair) considered the same challenges to the amendments by the same respondents in Lemire's case - Paul Fromm in #2 and Douglas Christie / Barbara Kulaszka (and Lemire having applied and been rejected as an intervenor) in #1 - and found them constitutional.

In January 2014, the Federal Court of Appeal ruled against Lemire in a decision that found Section 13 to be constitutionally valid and reinstated the penalty section and the CHRT's cease and desist order against Lemire violating Section 13, regardless of the fact that by that point the section had already been repealed by parliament.

In 2008, Lemire filed 2 criminal complaints alleging that Canadian Human Rights Commission investigators surreptitiously used an unrelated person's unsecured Internet connection, purportedly in violation of the Criminal Code, to investigate his activity. The office of the Privacy Commissioner of Canada found no evidence that the CHRC had accessed the network during the course of their investigation, and that "the association of [the individual's] internet address to the rights commission likely was 'simply a mismatch' on the part of a third party."

== See also ==
- Bernard Klatt
