= Barbara Kulaszka =

Canadian lawyer

Barbara Kulaszka (1952/1953 – June 15, 2017) was a Canadian lawyer who practised law in Brighton, Ontario, known for her work with far-right causes, defending alleged Nazi war criminals and Holocaust deniers, and free speech cases.

== Practice ==
Kulaszka earned a law degree and was admitted to the Law Society of Upper Canada in 1980. She began her law practice in 1987 and acted with Doug Christie as co-counsel to Holocaust denier Ernst Zündel in the 1980s, and then assisted Christie as a legal researcher in a subsequent Zündel case in the 1990s. She also assisted Christie in the defence of alleged Nazi war criminal Imre Finta, who was acquitted in 1990 (see R v Finta).

In 1990, she represented former Nazi rocket scientist Arthur Rudolph when he entered Canada and unsuccessfully sought visitor status when the government ruled he was inadmissible due to his suspected culpability in war crimes. Rudolph ultimately left Canada of his own accord and an immigration hearing held in his absence, at which he was represented by Kulaszka, ruled that Rudolph could not return to Canada due to his use of slave labour to produce V-2 missiles during World War II.

She addressed meetings of Paul Fromm's Canadian Association for Free Expression. In 2005, she defended Heritage Front leader Marc Lemire before the Canadian Human Rights Tribunal against a complaint filed against him by Richard Warman. While losing the case, resulting in Lemire receiving a lifetime ban from publishing hate speech on the internet, the case is credited with resulting in the decision of the Canadian government to repeal Section 13.1 of the Canadian Human Rights Act which had given the Canadian Human Rights Tribunal jurisdiction over the communication of hate speech online. More recently, she unsuccessfully defended the operators of the conservative online forum Free Dominion after they were sued for defamation by Warman. Her legal practice was based in Brighton, Ontario.

== Death ==
On June 15, 2017, Kulaszka died of lung cancer at the age of 64.

Her memorial service, held in a Toronto Public Library branch in Etobicoke on July 12, 2017, became a source of controversy due to plans to have speeches by white nationalists such as Paul Fromm and former Heritage Front leader Marc Lemire; Jewish and anti-racist groups urging the library to cancel the booking due to fears that it would promote hate speech and Holocaust denial.

Mayor John Tory was among those calling on the library to cancel the event.

== Written works ==
Kulaszka edited Did Six Million Really Die? – Report of the Evidence in the Canadian "False News" Trial of Ernst Zündel, 1988 and wrote a second book, The Hate Crimes Law in Canada, 1970–1994: Effects and Operation. Both books were published by Zündel's Samisdat Publishers.
