= Marilyn Stafford =

British photographer (1925–2023)

- in the Lebanon in 1960
- Born: Marilyn Jean Gerson; 5 November 1925; Cleveland, Ohio, U.S.
- Died: 2 January 2023 (aged 97); Shoreham-by-Sea, England
- Occupation: Photographer
- Years active: 1948–2022
- Spouses: Joseph Kohn (divorced); Robin Stafford (m. 1958; div. 1965); João Manuel Viera (m. 2001; died 2016)
- Children: 1

Marilyn Jean Stafford (née Gerson; 5 November 1925 – 2 January 2023) was a British photographer. Born and raised in the United States, she moved to Paris as a young woman, where she began working as a photojournalist. She settled in London, but travelled and worked across the world, including in Tunisia, India, and Lebanon. Her work was published in The Observer and other newspapers. Stafford also worked as a fashion photographer in Paris, where she photographed models in the streets in everyday situations, rather than in the more usual opulent surroundings.

Stafford published three books of photographs, Silent Stories: A Photographic Journey Through Lebanon in the Sixties (1998); Stories in Pictures: A Photographic Memoir 1950 (2014) of Paris in the 1950s; and Marilyn Stafford: A Life in Photography (2021). She had solo exhibitions at the Nehru Centre, London; Arundel Museum; Alliance Française de Toronto; Art Bermondsey Project Space; Farleys House, East Sussex; and a retrospective at Brighton Museum & Art Gallery in 2022. In 2020 she was awarded the Chairman's Lifetime Achievement Award at the UK Picture Editors' Guild Awards in London.

== Life and work ==
Stafford was born Marilyn Gerson on 5 November 1925 in Cleveland, Ohio, United States.

At age seven she was selected to train to be an actor with the Cleveland Play House. Later she moved to New York City to act and had small roles Off-Broadway and in early television.

In 1948, Stafford went with friends interviewing Albert Einstein for a documentary film. In the car they handed her a 35 mm camera—she had never used one before—and gave her a quick lesson on how to use it. She took several photographs and gave the film to her friends, who sent her a couple of prints. In order to gain experience in photography, she worked as an assistant to the fashion photographer Francesco Scavullo.

In December 1948 she joined a friend in moving to Paris. For a short while she sang with an ensemble at Chez Carrère, a dinner club off the Champs-Élysées. There she met and became friends with the war photographer and photojournalist Robert Capa. She carried a camera and took what she later described as "happy snaps", but, working as a singer, had no thought of becoming a professional photographer until she lost her voice and could not continue singing. She asked Capa for advice on becoming a photographer; he suggested war photography, but this did not appeal to her. Her friend the writer Mulk Raj Anand introduced her to another photographer, Henri Cartier-Bresson, who she also became friends with. Cartier-Bresson encouraged her to take photographs on the streets of Paris, so she took buses to the end of the line and made photographs such as of children (some candid, some not) in the slum of Cité Lesage-Bullourde (near Place de la Bastille, and since cleared to make way for Opéra Bastille); and in the neighbourhood of Boulogne-Billancourt, in 1950. In 1956 she married Robin Stafford, a British foreign correspondent for the Daily Express working in Paris. In 1958, whilst five or six months pregnant with their daughter, Stafford went on a personal assignment to Tunisia to document and publicise the plight of Algerian refugees fleeing France's scorched earth aerial bombardment in the Algerian War. Back in Paris she showed the pictures to Cartier-Bresson, who made a selection and sent them to The Observer, which published two on its front page.

In Paris Stafford also worked as a fashion photographer for a public relations agency, photographing various types of clothing. Fashion photography of haute couture (custom-fitted) clothing at that time was normally modelled in opulent surroundings so as to convey a sense of luxury. In photographing the new ready-to-wear clothing of the time, Stafford instead took a documentary approach, photographing models in the streets, suggesting more down-to-earth situations.

In the late 1950s her husband's work sent the couple to Rome, then in the early 1960s to Beirut for over a year. Stafford travelled extensively in Lebanon, photographing people and places, later collected in her book Silent Stories: A Photographic Journey through Lebanon in the Sixties (1998).

Stafford and her husband separated. In the mid-1960s she moved to London, working as a photographer in various roles. She worked freelance as an international photojournalist for The Observer on both commissions and self-assigned projects, one of few women photographers working for national newspapers at that time. In 1972 she spent a month photographing Indira Gandhi, Prime Minister of India. She worked as a stills photographer on feature films and commercials, including on All Neat in Black Stockings (1969).

Throughout her career she has made portraits, including those of Cartier-Bresson, Edith Piaf, Italo Calvino, Le Corbusier, Renato Guttuso, Carlo Levi, Sharon Tate, Donovan, Christopher Logue, Lee Marvin, Joanna Lumley, David Frost, Richard Attenborough, Alan Bates, and Twiggy.

== Personal life and death ==
Stafford was married three times. After a marriage to filmmaker Joseph Kohn ended in divorce, she married Robin Stafford in 1958. They had a daughter, Lina Clerke, and divorced in 1965. Stefford married João Manuel Viera in 2001, and they were together until his death in 2016.

In her later years, Stafford lived in Shoreham-by-Sea, West Sussex. She died at her home on 2 January 2023, at the age of 97.

== Marilyn Stafford FotoReportage Award ==
The Marilyn Stafford FotoReportage Award was launched on International Women's Day 2017. It is granted annually to a professional woman photographer working on a documentary photo essay which addresses a social, environmental, economic or cultural issue. The winner receives £2000 (initially £1000) and mentoring by Stafford and FotoDocument, an organisation that uses documentary photography to draw attention to positive social and environmental activity.

=== Winners ===
- 2017: Rebecca Conway; honorable mentions for Ranita Roy, Monique Jaques, and Lynda Gonzalez
- 2018: Özge Sebzeci; runners up Mary Turner and Simona Ghizzoni
- 2019: Anna Filipova
- 2021: Isadora Romero; runner up was Stefanie Silber
- 2022: Natalya Saprunova for Kildin, a Language for Russian Sámis Survivors

== Publications ==
- Silent Stories: A Photographic Journey through Lebanon in the Sixties. London: Saqi, 1998. ISBN 978-0-86356-099-6. With a preface by Vénus Khoury-Ghata, "Marilyn Stafford's Theatre of the Unexpected".
- Stories in Pictures: A Photographic Memoir 1950. Shoreham, UK: Shoreham Wordfest, 2014. ISBN 978-0-9930446-0-1. With a foreword by Simon Brett and an introduction by Nina Emett. Edition of 50 copies.
  - Second edition. Shoreham, UK: Shoreham Wordfest, 2016. Edition of 100 copies. ISBN 978-0-9930446-0-1.
- Photographic Memories – Lost Corners of Paris: The Children of Cité Lesage-Bullourde and Boulogne-Billancourt, 1949–1954. 2017. Texts in English and French by Julia Winckler and Adrienne Chambon, photographs by Stafford. Exhibition catalogue. (Note: A PDF of the exhibition catalogue can be viewed here within the website of Julia Winckler.)
- Marilyn Stafford: A Life in Photography. Liverpool: Bluecoat, 2021. ISBN 9781908457707.

== Solo exhibitions ==
- Indira and Her India, Nehru Centre, London, 2013.
- Arundel Museum, Arundel, UK, December 2013. A retrospective of work from the 1940s to 1960s.
- Photographic Memories of Lost Spaces: The Children of Cité Lesage-Bullourde and Boulogne-Billancourt, Paris 1949–1954, Alliance Française de Toronto, Toronto, Canada, 2017. Curated by Julia Winckler.
- Marilyn Stafford – Stories in Pictures 1950–60, Lucy Bell Gallery, St Leonards-on-Sea, UK, 2017; Art Bermondsey Project Space, London, 2017.
- Silent Echoes – Portraits from the Archive, After Nyne Gallery, London, 2018. Curated by Nina Emett.
- Marilyn Stafford – Fashion Retrospective 1950s–1980s, Lucy Bell Gallery, St Leonards-on-Sea, UK, 2018.
- A Life in Photography, Farleys House, East Sussex, 2021
- Marilyn Stafford: A Life in Photography, Brighton Museum & Art Gallery, Brighton and Hove, 2022; Dimbola Museum and Galleries, Isle of Wight, 2022

== Films ==
- I Shot Einstein (2016) – eight-minute documentary film about Stafford, directed by Daniel Ifans (Note: As Dan Evans) and Merass Sadek, produced by We Are Tilt. (Note: The film can be viewed here at Vimeo) Shown at the Artemis Women In Action Film Festival 2017 (Santa Monica, CA); Middlebury New Filmmakers Festival 2017 (Middlebury, VT); FilmBath 2017 (Bath, UK); Paris Lift-Off Festival Online 2017; Ethnografilm 2018 (Paris, France); Cine-City 2017 (Brighton, UK); Cleveland International Film Festival 2017 (Cleveland, Ohio).

== Awards ==
- 2020: Chairman's Lifetime Achievement Award 2019, UK Picture Editors' Guild Awards, London

== Collections ==
Stafford's work is held in the following permanent collection:

- The British Architectural Library, Royal Institute of British Architects (RIBA), London: 5 items
