= Confederation of Regions Party of Canada =

- Former federal party
- Founder: Elmer Knutson
- Founded: 1984
- Dissolved: 1988 (Federal, some provincial branches continued)
- Split from: Social Credit Party
- Merged into: Reform Party of Canada (de facto)
- Ideology: Conservatism; Regionalism; Anti-bilingualism
- Political position: Right-wing
- Colours: Green, Yellow

The Confederation of Regions Party (CoR) was a right-wing federal political party in Canada founded in 1984 by Elmer Knutson. It was founded as a successor to the Western Canada Federation (West-Fed), a non-partisan organization, to fight the Liberal Party of Canada. The CoR aimed to fill the void on the right of the political spectrum left by the decline of the Social Credit Party of Canada and the growing unpopularity among westerners of the Progressive Conservative Party of Canada under the leadership of Brian Mulroney.

The party also attracted significant support as a protest vote against official bilingualism among some voters who were not necessarily ideologically opposed to mainstream Canadian political parties on other issues. The party proposed dividing Canada into four 'regions', western Canada, Atlantic Canada, Ontario and Quebec, each with an equal number of seats in the House of Commons of Canada.

In the 1984 federal election, it nominated 55 candidates, who won 65,655 votes in total, or 0.52% of the popular vote across the country. The party took 2.2% of the vote in Alberta and peaked with 6.7% in Manitoba.

In the 1988 federal election, its 51 candidates won 41,342 votes, 0.31% of the popular vote. One of its candidates was Paul Fromm, leader of the far-right groups Citizens for Foreign Aid Reform and Canadian Association for Free Expression. (See also: Confederation of Regions Party candidates, 1988 Canadian federal election).

The party's greatest success came in New Brunswick, where its provincial wing, the New Brunswick Confederation of Regions Party, held the status of official opposition from 1991 to 1995. After the demise of CoR, many former supporters joined the Reform Party of Canada.

== Provincial wings ==
The CoR captured about 2% of the vote in provincial elections in the 1988 Manitoba election and the 1990 Ontario election.

=== Alberta ===
The CoR's Alberta wing nominated candidates in the 1986 provincial election and the 1993 provincial election. In 1986, the party nominated six candidates, who won a total of 2,866 votes, or 0.40% of the total. In 1993, the party nominated 12 candidates, who won 3,556 votes, or 0.36% of the total.

On 17 June 1996, the Chief Electoral Officer of Alberta, cancelled the registration of the Confederation of Regions Party of Alberta and the party was struck from the Register of Alberta Political Parties because the party failed to comply with the registration requirements of the Election Finances and Contributions Disclosure Act. The COR Party was struck from the register because two conflicting groups in the party claimed different persons were officers of the party. The party presented different addresses of record. The conflicting groups had different interpretations of the COR Party Constitution. As the Chief Electoral Officer did not have the authority to resolve such issues, he referred the participants in the dispute to the courts. Neither side in the dispute applied to the courts in an effort to resolve the problem, and the party did not run any candidates 1997 election nor any election since.

== Party program ==
The party program was set out in a website that aimed to re-establish CoR as a federal political party. Grammatical, punctuation and formatting errors have been left intact.

COR wants to become a nationwide Federal Party, and wishes to represent all Canadians who want to live in a true democracy, restore Canada's prosperity and rebuild its National Institutions.

We want to become an egalitarian, populist party slightly to the right of center in the political spectrum

We aspire to be the elected representative of all Canadians who embrace these views about their nation.

A Canada that follows a policy of "Canada First"

A Canada that practices true democracy, where individual rights are paramount, majority rule is applied, minorities are protected by law and all citizens are equal

A Canada that teaches its people about their true history, celebrates their contributions, achievements and sacrifices and takes pride in its unique heritage and tradition

A Canada that is viewed by all as a land of "the true north, strong and free"

A Canada whose multi-racial and multi-cultural heritage is acknowledged but where Canadian nationality is neither divided or hyphenated and where one official language and one legal system based on common law serves to unite its people

We believe that Canada has evolved into four economic, geographic, commercial and political regions which, has the potential to become one strong and united nation once Canadians have been allowed to draft and ratify a true Constitution for Canada at a constituent assemble of elected delegates.

COR (whose name is derived from its belief) believes that in such a "Confederation of Regions", each region should be free to develop its potential to the full whilst complementing the Canadian nation as a whole.

We believe that during the last 25 years Canadians have been unable to change things because of the political and economic bankruptcy of old line parties who encourage the enshrinement of flawed vision of Canada's future, a politically imposed Canadian Constitution, the greed of big business and the existence of an "establishment" consists of institutionalized elites who strive to retain power by maintaining the status quo and perpetuating myths about Canada's past.

Our goals have been shaped by events of our times such as the latest recession that our politicians were eventually obliged to acknowledge and the presence of an ever growing number of homeless and hungry Canadian men, women and children who are now walking the streets and roads of this land in search of personal pride and dignity and a restored sense of what is means to be a Canadian.

Our policies have also been influenced by the cavalier attitude of the present government with regard to how its spends the taxpayer's dollar, its contempt for the nation's ever increasing national debt and its inability to address the rising unemployment that is eroding the foundations of Canadian society and which is now impacting negatively on Canadians from all walks of life.

The overriding goal of the policies is to restore Canadian prosperity and build Canadian democracy.

== See also ==
- List of political parties in Canada
