= First Story Toronto =

Indigenous tour in Toronto

First Story Toronto is an Indigenous-led organization that researches and promotes Indigenous history in Toronto through public initiatives such as guided and self-directed educational tours. The walking, biking and bus tours help raise awareness of the historical and enduring presence of Indigenous peoples in the Great Toronto Area (GTA).

== Founding ==
First Story Toronto Tours initially started in 1994 as the "Great Indian Bus Tour." It was led by Indigenous activists Rodney Bobiwash and Heather Howard as part of the Native Community History Project at the Native Canadian Centre of Toronto.

== Content ==
The "Great Indian Bus Tour" included information on Indigenous histories from archaeological research, archival records, and oral history recording by Toronto's First Nations elders and community members. It was a three to five-hour bus tour that highlighted Indigenous place-names across the city as a way to raise awareness of Indigenous histories.

== Expansion ==
Following Rodney Bobiwash’ passing in 2002, First Story Toronto members expanded the original “Great Indian Bus Tour” to include additional stories and circuits. This includes walking tours of the three University of Toronto campuses, as well as Toronto Metropolitan University and York University. In 2012, the tours were adapted into the First Story Toronto mobile app that puts Indigenous histories and research on an interactive online map. In 2017, First Story Toronto led a Truth and Reconciliation on the Streets of Toronto tour.

== See also ==
- Cultural tourism
