= It's okay to be white =

Slogan associated with white supremacy

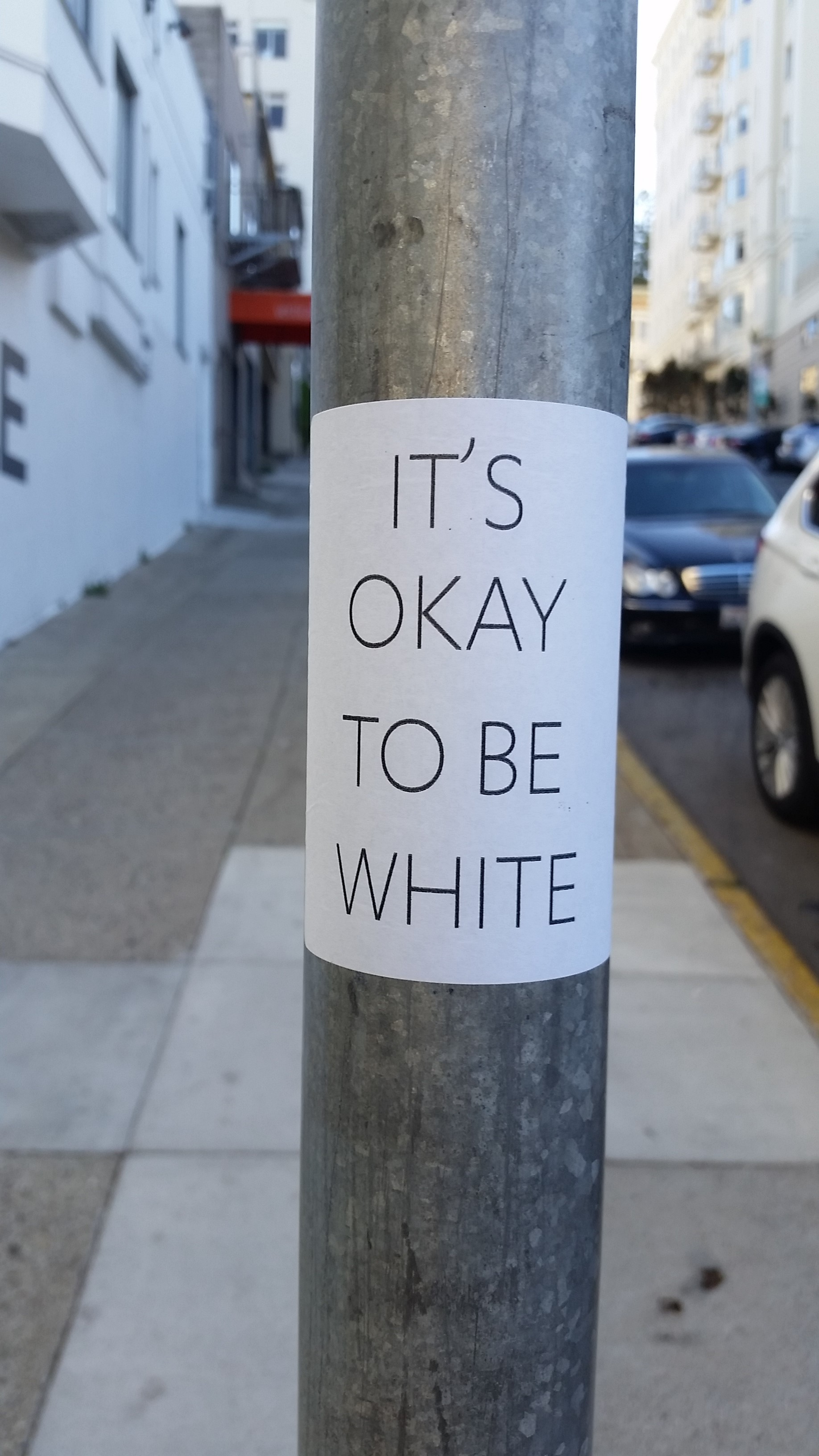
A sticker with the slogan publicly displayed in 2017

"It's okay to be white" (IOTBW) is an alt-right slogan which originated as part of an organized trolling campaign on the website 4chan's discussion board /pol/ in 2017. A /pol/ user described it as a proof of concept that an otherwise innocuous message could be used maliciously to spark media backlash. Posters and stickers stating "It's okay to be white" were placed in streets in the United States as well as on campuses in the United States, Canada, Australia, and the United Kingdom.

The slogan has been supported by white supremacists and neo-Nazis.

== Background ==
The suggestion for the use of posters with the saying originated on the message board /pol/ of 4chan, with the intent of provoking reactions. The saying was later spread by neo-Nazi groups and politically organized white supremacists, including former Ku Klux Klan Grand Wizard David Duke and The Daily Stormer. A report by the Anti-Defamation League states that the phrase itself has a history within the white supremacist movement going back to 2001 when it was used as the title of a song by a white power music group called Aggressive Force as well as fliers with the phrase being spotted in 2005 and the slogan being used by a member of the United Klans of America.

== Reactions ==
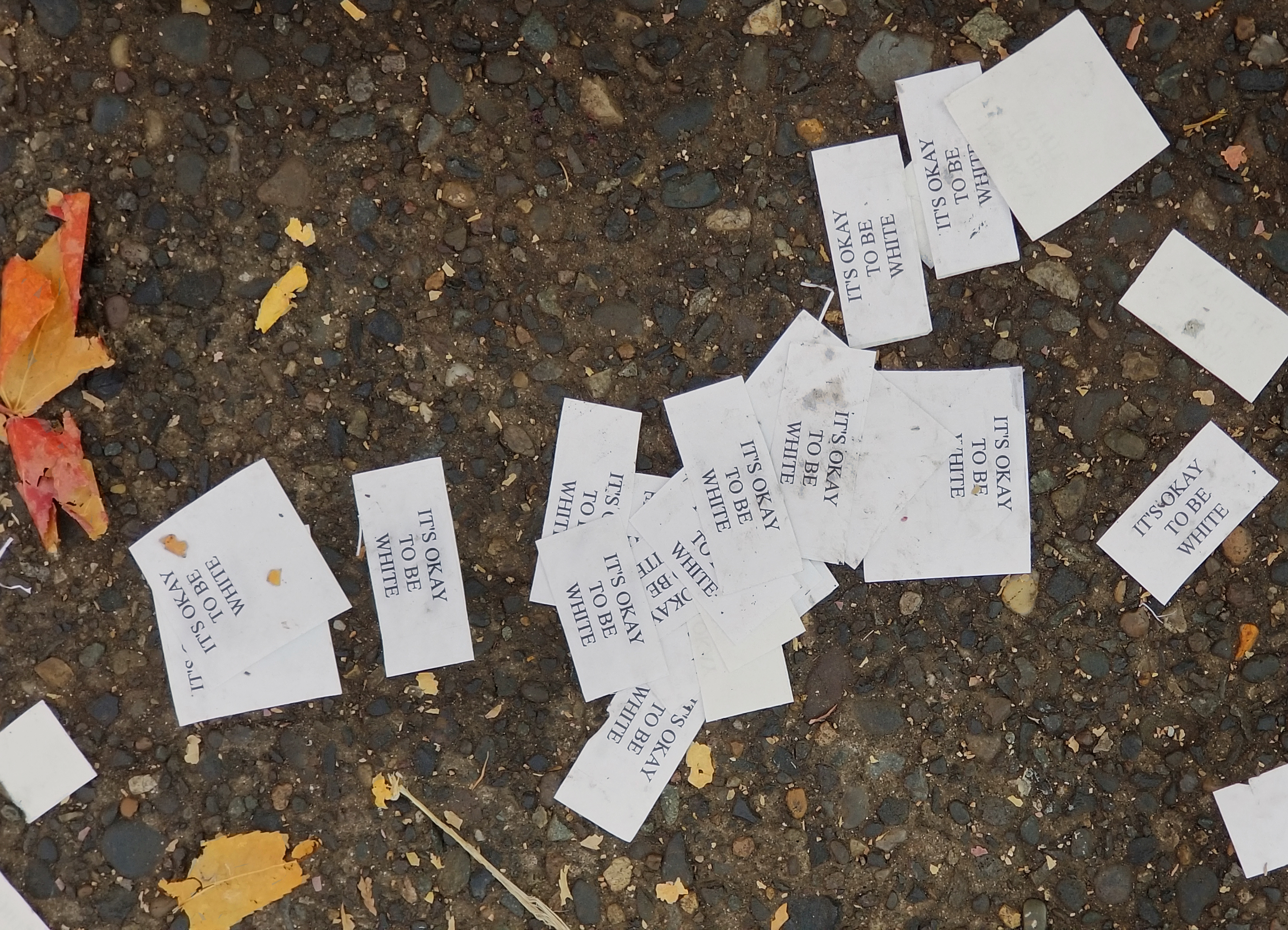
Discarded "It's okay to be white" cards after a Patriot Prayer protest in Portland, Oregon

Many of the flyers were torn down, and some accused the posters of being covertly racist and white nationalist, while others, like Jeff Guillory, executive director of Washington State University's Office of Equity and Diversity, argued that it was a nonthreatening statement.

=== Academia ===
The University of Regina declared the posters divisive. University President Vianne Timmons said: "Simply put, these signs have no place at our university."

A spokesman for a Waterloo Region District School Board commented: "Our schools are safe spaces. We want to see them be safe for all of our children, so to see this kind of thing emerge is a worry."

After the signs were found at Washington State University, Phil Weiler, Vice President of University Communications, said: "one could reasonably believe the intention of the signs is to set a sense of fear and intimidation on campus". Executive director of Washington State University's Office of Equity and Diversity responded to the posters by saying: "In my mind, it's a nonthreatening statement", further stating: "Sure, it's OK to be white. It's OK to be African-American. It's OK to be Latino. It's OK to be gay."

The University of Utah said: "If, indeed, these tactics are meant to silence our work in diversity and inclusion, please know we shall not be deterred." Concordia College said that their president was planning a meeting where students could discuss the matter.

Police were contacted regarding the flyers being posted at the University of California, Berkeley. A police department spokesperson said "the signs did not constitute a hate crime because they did not target a specific race and because no criminal act was committed".

In November 2017, Lucian Wintrich attempted to give a speech titled "It's OK to be White" at the University of Connecticut as an invited speaker of the school's Republican club. The speech was protested and came to an end when a protester, employed as the director of career services at Quinebaug Valley Community College, grabbed Wintrich's speech papers from the podium and Wintrich grabbed her, resulting in breach of peace charges against Wintrich. In December 2017, the charges against Wintrich were dropped, and the woman who took the papers was charged with attempted sixth-degree larceny and disorderly conduct. She stated through her attorney she took Wintrich's speech as a form of protest, describing Wintrich's "It's OK to be White" speech as hateful language.

=== Media ===
Some media sources reacted in the way the original authors on 4chan had expected.

Tucker Carlson on Fox News defended the campaign in a segment entitled "High school Fliers Create Shock and Horror". Carlson asked: "What's the correct position? That it's not okay to be white?" Newsweek writer Michael Hayden said Carlson was helping to spread neo-Nazi propaganda by defending the posters, saying the slogan is being "promoted by neo-Nazis and white supremacists." Writing for The Washington Post, Janell Ross commented on the poster campaign, saying "the white victim construct is one that experts say, not so long ago, only had traction in avowed white supremacists, segregationists, and neo-Nazi circles. But today, it animates open and anonymous public discussions of race and shapes the nation's politics." The Root compared it with the children's book It's Okay to Be Different and said "white folks have taken that beautiful sentiment and distorted it to suit their infinite need to center themselves".

The Guardian columnist Jason Wilson argued that the modern use of the slogan was intended to be "ostensibly inoffensive", so that responses from those who recognised its racist background would seem like an overreaction, and might give the appearance to the general public that "leftists and journalists hate white people".

=== Merchandising ===
According to ThinkProgress, T-shirts with the slogan were put on sale at Shopify by right-wing provocateur Milo Yiannopoulos.

In May 2019, New Zealand auction site Trade Me removed the sale of "It's okay to be white" T-shirts sold by manufacturer VJM Publishing amid public backlash. VJM Publishing Vice President Vince McLeod defended the sales on the VJM Publishing company page, stating that "It's okay to be whatever you naturally are." The controversy was widely reported worldwide and was only a couple of months after the white supremacist Christchurch mosque shootings. In the wake of Trade Me banning the shirt, the seller moved to another New Zealand online marketplace, AllGoods.

=== Australian parliament motion ===
On October 15, 2018, right-wing politician Pauline Hanson proposed an "It's okay to be white" motion in the Australian Senate intended to acknowledge the "deplorable rise of anti-white racism and attacks on Western civilization". It was supported by most senators from the governing Liberal–National Coalition, but was defeated 31–28 by opponents who called it "a racist slogan from the white supremacist movement." The following day, the motion was "recommitted", and this time rejected unanimously by senators in attendance, with its initial supporters in the Liberal–National Coalition saying they had voted for it due to an administrative error. One Nation did not attend the recommital vote.

=== Community response ===
In 2020, following a spate of such stickers appearing in Ipswich, England, local residents responded by altering the stickers to read "It's okay to be kind".

In a February 2023 poll conducted by Rasmussen Reports, a polling firm often referred to by conservative media, 72% of 1,000 respondents agreed with the statement "It's okay to be White". Among the 130 black respondents, 53% agreed, while 26% disagreed, and 21% were unsure. Slate magazine suggested that some negative respondents may have been familiar with the term's links with white supremacy. The Dilbert comic strip was dropped by many newspapers after author Scott Adams, reacting on his podcast to the outcome of this poll, characterised black people as a "hate group" for not agreeing with the statement and encouraged white people to "get the hell away from" them.

== See also ==
- All Lives Matter
- Black Lives Matter
- Canadian Heritage Alliance – creator of "Love Your Race" campaign targeted toward white people
- Owning the libs
- Playing the victim
- White Lives Matter
- White pride
- White nationalism
