= Paul Fromm (white supremacist) =

Canadian white supremacist

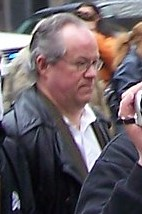
- Fromm in 2009

Metropolitan Separate School Board Trustee for Area 11 (Etobicoke)
- In office 1976–1978
- Preceded by: Ed Webster
- Succeeded by: Francis Hogan

Personal details
- Born: Frederick Paul Fromm; January 3, 1949 (age 77) Bogotá, Colombia
- Party: Social Credit (1971–72); Western Guard (1972–73); Progressive Conservative (1981–83); Reform (1987–88); Confederation of Regions (1988); Western Block (2011–14); Independent (1973–1981, 1988–2011, 2014–2018); Canadians' Choice (2018–present)
- Education: University of Toronto (MA)
- Occupation: High school teacher (1974–1997)

Frederick Paul Fromm (born January 3, 1949) is a Canadian former high school teacher, white supremacist, neo-Nazi, and perennial political candidate.

Fromm is the international director of the white supremacist organization Council of Conservative Citizens and is the director of several far-right groups in Canada, most notably the Canadian Association for Free Expression, Citizens for Foreign Aid Reform and the Canada First Immigration Reform Committee.

He has hosted a radio show on the Stormfront web site and has ties to former Ku Klux Klan members David Duke, Don Black, and Mark Martin, a white supremacist rally organizer in Covington, Ohio. The National Post newspaper described him as "one of Canada's most notorious white supremacists".

Fromm lived in Mississauga, Ontario, for several decades before moving to Hamilton, Ontario, in 2018.

== Early life and education ==
Fromm was born in Bogotá, Colombia, to Canadian parents and grew up in Etobicoke, Ontario, in a devout Catholic family. His mother, Marguerite Michaud, was of French-Canadian descent, while his father, Frederick William Fromm, was of German and Irish ancestry.

His father served in the Royal Canadian Navy during the Second World War. After the war, he qualified as a chartered accountant and worked for an oil company in Colombia. Following Fromm's birth, the family returned to Ontario, where his father worked as an accountant for the provincial Department of Highways, now the Ministry of Transportation of Ontario.

Fromm attended the University of Toronto, studying at St. Michael's College. He earned a bachelor's degree, a master's degree in English and a teaching qualification.

== Teaching career ==
Fromm began working for the Peel Board of Education in 1973 and taught English at Applewood Heights Secondary School in Mississauga.

In September 1991, Fromm attended a public meeting about race relations at which Indigenous activist Rodney Bobiwash of the Native Canadian Centre of Toronto was speaking. Fromm called out "scalp them", prompting the Canadian Jewish Congress, the Native Canadian Centre and Toronto community-relations officials to call for the Peel board to review his employment. Fromm maintained that the remark had been misinterpreted and said that he kept his political activities separate from his teaching.

In 1992, members of the Peel board viewed a recording of a speech Fromm had delivered to the Heritage Front two years earlier. The board asked the provincial government to review his teaching certificate, warned him to end his involvement with racist organizations and urged the Ontario Teachers' Federation to formulate guidelines governing teachers' political conduct. The federation responded that professional-conduct requirements already existed and that responsibility for disciplinary action rested with the school board.

The board reassigned Fromm from secondary-school teaching to adult education in 1993. Its chair described the transfer as the strongest measure then legally available to the board and suggested that adult students would be better able than adolescents to challenge inappropriate conduct.

The Peel board dismissed Fromm in 1997 because of his continued involvement in white-supremacist activities. He subsequently faced professional-misconduct proceedings before the Ontario College of Teachers. Following hearings held between 2005 and 2007, the college revoked his teaching certificate on October 31, 2007.

== White supremacist activities ==
Fromm was an admirer of Fidel Castro in the early 1960s, but changed his views after coming across the writings of Barry Goldwater.

In 1967, as a student at the University of Toronto's St. Michael's College, Fromm co-founded the Edmund Burke Society (EBS), with Don Andrews and Leigh Smith, as well as its student wing "Campus Alternative". The Edmund Burke Society was a right-wing anti-communist group that agitated against prominent left-wing movements. The group would often disrupt left-wing rallies and events, sometimes violently. The group's main focus was opposition to the New Left and other left-wing tendencies that the Society associated with communism. In 1970, the group disrupted a speech by left-wing radical lawyer, William Kunstler, with Fromm climbing on stage and pouring a glass of water on Kunstler's lecture notes, resulting in the Chicago Seven's lawyer drenching Fromm with a pitcher of water. A melee between EBS members and Kunstler's supporters ensued, and Fromm was knocked to the floor unconscious.

With the support of members of the Edmund Burke Society, Fromm was elected president of the Ontario Social Credit Party in 1971, and was able to have other EBS members elected to the party's executive. Three Social Credit candidates in the 1971 Ontario election were avowed "Burkers".

As the New Left movement waned, Edmund Burke Society members turned their attention to issues of race and immigration and became increasingly attracted to white supremacist ideas. In February 1972, the group renamed itself the Western Guard. In 1972, after having lost the Social Credit Party presidency to James McGillvray, Fromm led a successful attempt by the Western Guard to take over the Ontario wing of the Social Credit Party of Canada. The national executive of the national Social Credit Party declared membership in the Western Guard "incompatible" with membership in the party, which led national Social Credit leader Réal Caouette to place the Ontario organization under trusteeship in order to counter Fromm's activities.

In May 1972, Fromm was the opening speaker at a Western Guard banquet honouring Robert E. Miles, a former Ku Klux Klan leader who became a leading ideologue in the Christian Identity movement. Fromm, Overfield and several others resigned from the Western Guard in May 1972, immediately after the Toronto Sun published an article on the group, which included information about the banquet. Fromm's departure left the leadership of the Western Guard in the hands of Don Andrews. Fromm claimed in a 1973 letter to the Toronto Star that he left the Western Guard "because of a growing radicalization of its politics and the irresponsibility of some of its activities". Later, he denied ever having been a member of the Guard, saying he "never had any connection" with the organization. When confronted with his 1973 letter, he dismissed it as "a matter of semantics".

On August 4, 2008, Fox News interviewed Fromm in relation to the prosecution of right-wing Canadian author Mark Steyn. The Southern Poverty Law Center criticised Fox for identifying Fromm only as a "Free Speech Activist".

In 2010, Fromm organized small protests across the country against the admission of a group of Sri Lankan Tamil refugees arriving on the MV Sun Sea. In August he led a small protest in Calgary with members of the Aryan Guard outside of Immigration Minister Jason Kenney's constituency office which "so terrified the receptionist that she locked the door and would not accept Mr. Fromm's delivery of a letter until police arrived". He also organized a small protest with Doug Christie in Esquimalt, British Columbia, where the boat was docked and also led small pickets later in the month in Ottawa and Hamilton.

=== Mainstream and electoral politics ===
Fromm graduated from university with a master's degree in English and an education degree. He worked as a school teacher with the Peel Region Board of Education from 1974 until his dismissal in 1997. He temporarily tried to distance himself from groups that were visibly linked to explicitly racist and neo-Nazi beliefs. He founded Countdown, which led to the creation of three organizations that attempted to make far-right views palatable to the mainstream. Fromm was elected as a Catholic school trustee in 1976, after an unsuccessful attempt in 1974, and served on the Metro Toronto Separate School Board until he was defeated in his bid for re-election two years later. His father, Fred, was also defeated in his 1978 bid for a seat on the board.

In 1976, Fromm founded the Citizens for Foreign Aid Reform (C-FAR), which opposes foreign aid to Third World nations. The organization also deals with other issues, including crime and punishment, multiculturalism and immigration. It sponsors lectures by far-right individuals, and publishes pamphlets and books, mostly about race and immigration. In 1981, Fromm founded Canadian Association for Free Expression (CAFE), in opposition to the Canadian Human Rights Commission. CAFE has been active defending the rights of accused antisemites, racists and Holocaust deniers against prosecution under hate crime and human rights legislation. Another group he founded was Canada First Immigration Reform Committee, which advocates reduced immigration, and opposes immigration by non-whites. These three groups still exist today and are still led by Fromm. Their membership and mandates overlap, and they are essentially a single organization. Fromm's leadership of these groups has given him some access to the mainstream media, such as radio talk shows and newspapers.

In the late 1970s, Fromm also founded Canadian Friends of Rhodesia to support the white minority rule regime of Ian Smith and his Rhodesian Front. In the mid to late 1980s, Fromm's organizations were involved in advocacy on behalf of South Africa's apartheid regime, and opposing the movement to impose economic sanctions on the country.

Fromm attempted to enter mainstream political activity by joining the Progressive Conservative Party of Canada. He was elected treasurer of PC Metro, a network of 31 Toronto PC riding associations on April 15, 1981. He angered many people and embarrassed both the federal and Ontario Progressive Conservatives when a profile in The Globe and Mail quoted him as saying that breeding a "supreme race" for intelligence was a good idea, and as calling for Vietnamese refugees to be sent to "desert islands" off the Philippines and Indonesia rather than be accepted into Canada where they would "upset the racial balance". His comments resulted in Progressive Conservative premier Bill Davis being asked in the legislature whether he is willing "to tolerate such neo-fascist, if not fascist, ideas within the Conservative Party". Federal Progressive Conservative immigration critic Chris Speyer said Fromm's remarks were "entirely his and certainly don't represent the views of the party or the caucus". Federal PC president Peter Blaikie asked Fromm to resign from the local executive, telling the press on April 30, 1981: "It's quite clear that that article, accurate or inaccurate, sets out a position which is clearly at variance with that of the party", and that the issue "has created some difficulty and embarrassment for the party".

In 1983, Fromm was an active supporter of right-wing Member of Parliament John A. Gamble's unsuccessful bid to win the leadership of the federal Progressive Conservatives. Fromm's work with Gamble continued beyond his unsuccessful leadership bid, and included work in the World Anti-Communist League. In 1993, Gamble was rejected as a candidate for the Reform Party of Canada because of his long association with Fromm and other racist activists.

In the late 1980s, Fromm was an active member of the Reform Party, but was essentially expelled in October 1988 when leader Preston Manning sent Fromm a letter asking him to "dissociate" himself from the party, following complaints by party members about the racist tenor of a speech Fromm made at a Reform Party gathering. In the 1988 federal election, Fromm ran as a candidate for the Confederation of Regions Party in the riding of Mississauga East, and received 288 votes.

In 1997, Fromm was a candidate for the public school board in Peel Region. He received 827 votes (10.39% of ballots cast), coming in last of four candidates.

Fromm was a candidate for mayor of Mississauga, Ontario in the October 25, 2010, municipal election, running on an anti-immigration platform. Fromm reportedly made racist and homophobic comments during his campaign and displayed white supremacist and Holocaust denial literature at his campaign tables. He claimed that train stations in the city looked "like flippin' Calcutta" and that the city had been "paved over with ticky tacky houses that are mostly filled with East Indians" and is also quoted as saying "I wake up in the morning and I feel great. I'm high on hate". On election day, Fromm came in ninth in a field of 17 with 917 votes which represented 0.65% of the total vote. Fromm again ran for Mayor of Mississauga in 2014 receiving 775 votes (0.48%) and coming in 10th in a field of 15.

In the 2011 federal election, Fromm stood in Calgary Southeast as the candidate of the far right Western Block Party against immigration minister Jason Kenney, on a platform advocating a freeze in immigration. Kenney was re-elected, winning over 76% of the vote, while Fromm received 193 votes, around 0.3%.

In 2016, Fromm attempted to join the Conservative Party of Canada in order to support the leadership campaign of Kellie Leitch due to her support for immigration reform and a "Canadian values" test for prospective immigrants. Leitch's campaign co-chair Sander Grieve wrote back to Fromm, saying: "We have not processed your membership and we will not be submitting it to the party, as we believe your public statements are not consistent with the principles of the party or the policies being advanced by our campaign."

Fromm endorsed socially conservative candidate Tanya Granic Allen in the 2018 Progressive Conservative Party of Ontario leadership election. Although she did not respond when originally asked for comment by the Toronto Star, Granic Allen later publicly stated on Twitter that she rejects his endorsement with the statement: "No place in our party for white supremacists."

Fromm was a candidate for the Canadians' Choice Party in Etobicoke Centre during the 2018 Ontario general election, receiving 631 votes (1.1%).

Fromm moved to Hamilton, Ontario in 2018, after having lived in Mississauga for several decades, and registered as a candidate for Mayor of Hamilton in the October 2018 municipal election. Fromm came in 7th in a field of 15 with 706 votes which represented 0.51% of the total vote.

In July 2019, Fromm posed for a photo with Maxime Bernier, party leader of the People's Party of Canada. He later endorsed Bernier on Twitter, writing that Bernier had "both the charisma and determination to put CANADA FIRST," and praising the former Conservative leadership contender's immigration policies as steps toward "regaining control" of Canada's border.

=== Recent electoral activity ===
Fromm ran for mayor of Hamilton, Ontario, in the 2022 Hamilton, Ontario, municipal election. He finished eighth among nine candidates, receiving 898 votes, or 0.63 per cent.

He contested the 2023 Scarborough—Guildwood provincial by-election as the Canadians' Choice Party candidate, receiving 66 votes, or 0.43 per cent.

Fromm returned to Etobicoke Centre as the Canadians' Choice candidate in the 2025 Ontario general election. He received 479 votes, or 1.04 per cent, finishing sixth among eight candidates.

In the 2026 Hamilton, Ontario, municipal election, Fromm ran for mayor of Hamilton, finishing twelfth out of thirteen candidates with 505 votes (0.35%).

=== Links to other prominent fascists and racists ===
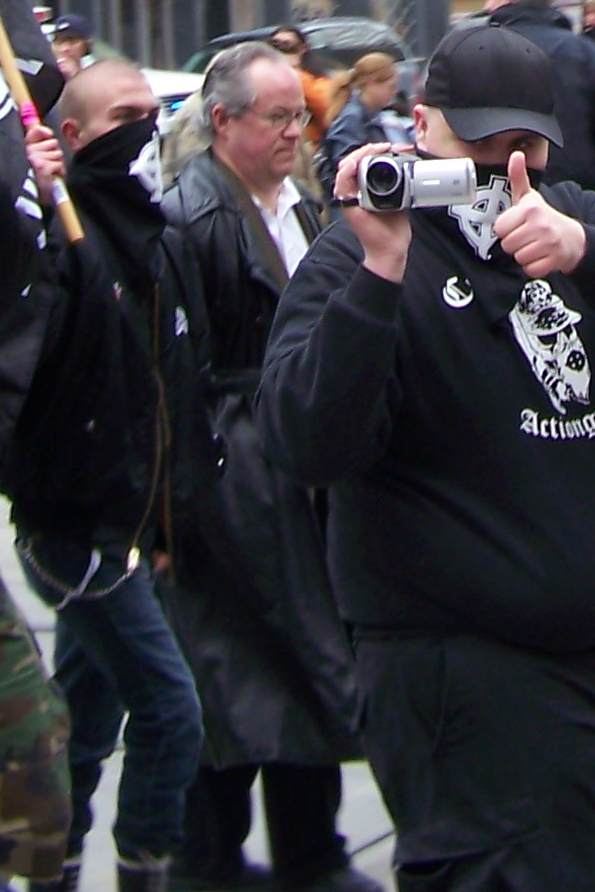
Fromm (middle person wearing glasses and no mask) marching with neo-Nazi Aryan Guard members in Calgary, Alberta on March 21, 2009

In the 1990s, Fromm spoke at several Heritage Front events, including a celebration of Adolf Hitler's birthday. A video surfaced of him addressing the rally and referring to Canadian fascist John Ross Taylor as a "hero". Taylor was one of two Canadian Nazis interned by the government during World War II. The video shows Fromm standing beside a Nazi flag during the Heritage Front's "Martyr's Day". The rally included shouts from the audience of "Sieg Heil!", "white power", "Hail The Order!" and "nigger, nigger, nigger, out out out". Fromm, a high school English teacher at the time, was reprimanded by the school board after videos of him speaking at white supremacist rallies came to light in 1992. He was transferred to an adult education centre by the board in 1993 pending the outcome of an investigation into his activities and then fired by the school board in 1997.

In 2000, a published report alleged that developer Martin Weiche, a former leader of the Canadian Nazi Party, was one of Fromm's major financial backers. Fromm organized rallies in support of Holocaust denier Ernst Zündel and has shared a stage with David Irving, another individual active in the same denialist movement. B'nai B'rith legal counsel Anita Bromberg has said "Fromm is the one who has put himself out there most directly as supporting Zündel. He looks as though he's waiting in the wings." In 2004, Fromm was associated with David Duke's efforts to unite white nationalists with the New Orleans Protocol. In the 2000s, he has tried to revive the display of the Canadian Red Ensign flag.

In January 2005, Fromm defended himself at a disciplinary hearing of the Ontario College of Teachers against charges including "failure to maintain professional standards; not complying with college regulations and bylaws; disgraceful, dishonourable, unprofessional and/or unbecoming conduct; and practising while in a conflict of interest." Following three days of hearings, further deliberations were postponed. The hearing resumed in the spring of 2007 and on October 31, 2007, the college rendered its ruling stripping Fromm of his licence to teach in the province of Ontario.

Fromm has acted as an advocate for far-right activists who have been called before the Canadian Human Rights Tribunal (CHRT). Among those Fromm has represented are Glenn Bahr, the co-founder and former leader of Western Canada for Us, and Terry Tremaine, a former University of Saskatchewan mathematics lecturer. In 2006, he represented the Canadian Heritage Alliance at a CHRT hearing in Toronto, and supported John Beck of the group BC White Pride at a CHRT hearing in Penticton, British Columbia. Fromm has been described as a mentor to younger "far-right extremists" such as Melissa Guille and Jason Ouwendyk and as a "'senior player' in the neo-Nazi movement in Canada." He identifies himself as an advocate for "white nationalists".

Fromm has repeatedly spoken at events sponsored by Thomas Robb's Ku Klux Klan faction, the Knights Party. In 2007, he was a keynote speaker at the group's White Christian Revival gathering.

On March 21, 2009, Fromm participated in a "White Pride" march organized by the Aryan Guard, a neo-Nazi gang in Calgary, Alberta.

=== Recent far-right activity ===
In March 2019, the hate-crimes unit of the Hamilton Police Service investigated Fromm after a website associated with him reproduced the manifesto attributed to Christchurch mosque shooter Brenton Tarrant. A link to the document was also posted through Fromm's social-media account. Fromm described the manifesto as "cogent" and said that violence was not the correct approach, but claimed that political elites had made it nearly inevitable.

In September 2019, a Hamilton City Council committee unanimously rejected Fromm's request to address council about what he characterized as free-speech concerns arising from the city's response to demonstrations in public places.

In August 2020, Fromm donated $131 to Derek Sloan's unsuccessful campaign in the 2020 Conservative Party of Canada leadership election. The donation became public in January 2021. Sloan said that his campaign had processed the contribution without recognizing Fromm's name and that he asked the party to return it after learning of it.

In July 2022, Fromm participated in a small demonstration outside the Toronto constituency office of federal diversity and inclusion minister Ahmed Hussen. The demonstrators opposed an educational toolkit produced by the Canadian Anti-Hate Network and carried Canadian Red Ensign flags. According to the network, the participants included Fromm and other longtime far-right organizers.

In November 2023, Fromm addressed a gathering in Truro, Nova Scotia, associated with the Maritime chapter of the Active Club Network, an international network of neo-Nazi groups organized around physical fitness and combat training. According to the Canadian Anti-Hate Network, the organizers credited Fromm with helping to establish an earlier generation of the Canadian white-nationalist movement.

Fromm unsuccessfully ran in the 2018 Hamilton, Ontario, municipal election, 2022 Hamilton election, and 2026 Hamilton election.

== Opposition ==
Fromm's "Alternative Forum" meetings have been the targets of demonstrations, and have been disrupted and occasionally shut down by protesters.

On August 19, 2006, dozens of anti-fascist youths surrounded Fromm's Port Credit, Ontario townhouse, challenging Fromm to come outside. Although he reportedly remained inside, approximately half a dozen neo-Nazis were present outside his home. Over 50 police officers were on call to protect Fromm and his supporters. The area was plastered in flyers advertising Fromm's home address and far-right political affiliations. The protest ended without incident.

On his way to an April 19, 2007 Ontario College of Teachers hearing into his conduct, Fromm was involved in a scuffle with Jewish Defense League (JDL) members in an elevator. Protesters claimed that Fromm shoved them, but Fromm asserts that the JDL members lunged at him. Police arrested two protesters, charging them with assault, assaulting police, and obstructing.

In October 2007, the House of Commons of Canada unanimously passed a resolution banning Fromm and Alexan Kulbashian from the Parliament of Canada buildings after they attempted to hold a press conference in the parliamentary press theatre. The resolution read: "That this House order that Alexan Kulbashian and Paul Fromm be denied admittance to the precincts of the House of Commons during the present session to preserve the dignity and integrity of the House".

In 2015, Fromm said in an interview posted on YouTube that he was denied entry into the United States by the Department of Homeland Security.

=== Libel case ===
Fromm and his Canadian Association for Free Expression were sued by Ottawa lawyer Richard Warman for libelling the anti-racist activist in various online posts. On November 23, 2007, Ontario Superior Court Justice Monique Métivier ruled in Warman's favour, ordering Fromm to pay Warman a total of $30,000 in damages and to post full retractions on all the websites on which he posted the defamatory comments within 10 days. Métivier found that Fromm posted statements about Warman "either knowing the fundamental falseness of the accusations he levelled at Mr. Warman, or being reckless as to the truth of these". Métivier added that "The steady diet of diatribe and insults, couched in half-truths and omissions, all lead up to the finding of malice such that the defamatory statements are not protected by the defence of fair comment".

On December 15, 2008, the Ontario Court of Appeal upheld the original $30,000 defamation judgment against Fromm and added a $10,000 penalty in legal costs. Fromm posted a financial appeal complaining, "We are $17,500 behind in our legal bills – to say nothing of the possible $40,000 debt, if this judgment stands". Richard Warman responded to news of the appeal court's ruling by saying it "sends the message that those who try to use the cloak of free speech to poison other people's reputations through lies and defamation do so at their own peril".

The Supreme Court of Canada rejected Fromm's application to appeal the judgement on April 23, 2009.

== Electoral record ==
2026 Hamilton, Ontario mayoral election
Candidate	Popular vote			Expenditures
Candidate	Votes	%	±%	Expenditures
Keanin Loomis	61,040	41.77	+1.36	
Rob Cooper	46,573	31.87		
Andrea Horwath (X)	21,223	14.52	−27.16	
Scarlett Gillespie	9,531	6.52		
Ejaz Butt	1,686	1.15	−0.19	
Sasha Austin	1,367	0.94		
David Harrison	1,295	0.89		
David Cherkewski	776	0.53		
Kevin Walker	600	0.41		
Pamela Mitchell	590	0.40		
Erin Janus	517	0.35		
Paul Fromm	503	0.34	−0.29	
Nathalie Xian Yi Yan	420	0.29		
Total valid votes	146,121	100.00		
Total rejected, unmarked and declined votes				
Turnout				
Eligible voters				
Note: Hamilton municipal elections are officially non-partisan. Candidate campaign colours are based on the prominent colour used in campaign materials and are used to visually differentiate candidates.
Sources: City of Hamilton, "Nominated Candidates"

2025 Ontario general election: Etobicoke Centre
Party	Candidate	Votes	%	±%
Progressive Conservative	Kinga Surma	22,261	48.10	–0.49
Liberal	John Campbell	19,358	41.83	+7.78
New Democratic	Giulia Volpe	2,151	4.65	–3.96
Green	Brian Morris	1,000	2.16	–2.33
New Blue	Mario Bilusic	658	1.42	–1.04
Canadians' Choice	Paul Fromm	479	1.04	–
None of the Above	Richard M. Kiernicki	192	0.41	–0.02
Special Needs	Signe Miranda	180	0.39	–
Total valid votes		46,279	99.40	
Total rejected, unmarked and declined ballots		280	0.60	–0.04
Turnout		46,559	48.11	–0.43
Eligible voters		96,769		
Progressive Conservative hold		Swing		–4.13
Source: Elections Ontario

Ontario provincial by-election, July 27, 2023: Scarborough—Guildwood Resignation of Mitzie Hunter
Party	Candidate	Votes	%	±%	Expenditures
Liberal	Andrea Hazell	5,640	36.55	–9.75	$85,245
Progressive Conservative	Gary Crawford	4,562	29.57	–1.95	$57,878
New Democratic	Thadsha Navaneethan	4,041	26.19	+9.53	$80,598
Stop the New Sex-Ed Agenda	Tony Walton	508	3.29	–	$26,608
New Blue	Danielle Height	151	0.98	–0.29	$10,691
Green	Tara McMahon	146	0.95	–1.88	$0
No Affiliation	Reginald Tull	139	0.90	–	$8,266
Canadians' Choice	Paul Fromm	66	0.43	–	$0
Independent	Kevin Clarke	57	0.37	–0.14	$7,002
Independent	Habiba Desai	52	0.34	–	$0
Independent	Abu Alam	48	0.31	–	$395
Independent	John Turmel	20	0.13	–	$0
Total valid votes		15,430	99.49		
Total rejected, unmarked and declined ballots		79	0.51	–0.37	
Turnout		15,509	21.88	–19.75	
Eligible voters		70,893			
Liberal hold		Swing		–3.90	
Source: Elections Ontario

2022 Hamilton, Ontario, municipal election Results
Candidate	Votes	%
Andrea Horwath	59,216	41.68
Keanin Loomis	57,553	40.51
Bob Bratina	17,436	12.27
Ejaz Butt	1,907	1.34
Solomon Ikhuiwu	1,867	1.31
Jim Davis	1,433	1.01
Michael Pattison	1,422	1.00
Paul Fromm	898	0.63
Hermiz Ishaya	326	0.23
Turnout	143,375	35.38
Source: City of Hamilton, 2022, "2022 Official Election Results"

Candidates for the October 22, 2018 Hamilton, Ontario Mayoral Election
Candidate	Popular vote			Expenditures
Candidate	Votes	%	±%	Expenditures
Fred Eisenberger (Incumbent)	74,093	54.03%	+14.1%	
Vito Sgro	52,190	38.06%	n/a	
George Rusich	2,220	1.62%	n/a	
Jim Davis	2,071	1.51%	n/a	
Nathalie Xian Yi Yan	1,286	0.94%	n/a	
Michael Pattison	899	0.66%	+0.04	
Paul Fromm	706	0.51%	n/a	
Carlos Gomes	521	0.38%	n/a	
Todd May	500	0.36%	n/a	
Henry Geissler	494	0.36%	n/a	
Phil Ryerson	479	0.35%	+0.13%	
Ute Schmid-Jones	463	0.34%	n/a	
Edward Graydon	409	0.30%	n/a	
Mark Wozny	408	0.30%	n/a	
Ricky Tavares	398	0.29%	-0.06%	
Total votes	138,549	38.36%	+4.3%	
Registered voters	361,212	100%	n/a	
Note: All Hamilton Municipal Elections are officially non-partisan. Note: Candidate campaign colours are based on the prominent colour used in campaign items (signs, literature, etc.) and are used as a visual differentiation between candidates.
Sources: City of Hamilton, "Nominated Candidates" Archived May 4, 2018, at the Wayback Machine

2018 Ontario general election: Etobicoke Centre
Party	Candidate	Votes	%	±%
Progressive Conservative	Kinga Surma	24,432	43.00	+10.58
Liberal	Yvan Baker	19,708	34.68	–14.02
New Democratic	Erica Kelly	10,311	18.15	+6.63
Green	Shawn Rizvi	1,329	2.34	–0.29
Canadians' Choice	Paul Fromm	631	1.11	–
Libertarian	Basil Mummery	252	0.44	–
Independent	Wallace Richards	162	0.29	–
Total valid votes		56,825	99.00	
Total rejected, unmarked and declined ballots		573	1.00	–0.42
Turnout		57,398	61.91	+5.43
Eligible voters		92,715		
Progressive Conservative notional gain from Liberal		Swing		+12.30
Source: Elections Ontario

Mayor of Mississauga, October 27, 2014 municipal election
Candidate	Vote	%
Bonnie Crombie	102,346	63.49
Steve Mahoney	46,224	28.68
Dil Muhammad	2,429	1.51
Stephen King	1,874	1.16
Masood Khan	1,254	0.78
Donald Barber	1,225	0.76
Derek Ramkissoon	1,044	0.65
Scott E. W. Chapman	868	0.54
Riazuddin Choudhry	790	0.49
Paul Fromm	775	0.48
Kevin Jackal Johnston	741	0.46
Andrew Seitz	507	0.31
Joe Lomangino	415	0.26
Grant Isaac	392	0.24
Sheraz Siddiqui	315	0.20

2011 Canadian federal election: Calgary Southeast
Party	Candidate	Votes	%	±%	Expenditures
Conservative	Jason Kenney	48,173	76.26	+2.43	$54,158
New Democratic	Kirk Oates	6,482	10.26	+3.07	$5
Green	Brett Spencer	4,079	6.46	-3.80	$5,584
Liberal	Brian MacPhee	4,020	6.36	-2.36	$11,237
Independent	Antoni Grochowski	225	0.36	*	
Western Block	Paul Fromm	193	0.31	*	$5,393
Total valid votes/Expense limit		63,172	100.00	–	$104,090
Total rejected ballots		129	0.20	–	
Turnout		63,301	60.32	–	
Eligible voters		104,941	–	–	

Mayor of Mississauga, October 25, 2010 municipal election
Candidate	Vote	%
Hazel McCallion (X)	107,643	76.40
Dave Cook	10,744	7.63
George Winter	4,783	3.39
Ranjit Chahal	4,199	2.98
Ghani Ahsan	3,744	2.66
Ram Selvarajah	2,241	1.59
Peter Orphanos	2,140	1.52
Donald Barber	1,513	1.07
Paul Fromm	917	0.65
Martin Marinka	644	0.46
Bryan Robert Hallett	575	0.41
Shirley Vanden Berg	516	0.37
Ursula Keuper-Bennett	329	0.23
Andy Valenton	293	0.21
Antu Maprani Chakkunny	249	0.18
Andrew Seitz	233	0.17
Innocent Watat	139	0.10

Public School Trustee, Peel Board of Education, November 10, 1997 municipal election

Mississauga Wards 1 & 7

- Janet McDougald 2,862 (32%)
- Joan Parker 2,332 (29%)
- Gail Green 1,938 (24%)
- Paul Fromm 827 (10%)

1988 Canadian federal election: Mississauga East
Party	Candidate	Votes	%	±%
Liberal	GUARNIERI, Albina	23,055		
Progressive Conservative	PALLETT, Laurie	20,963		
New Democratic Party	GROZDANOVSKI, Walter	5,677		
Libertarian	HARRINGTON, Sandra	345		
Confederation of Regions	FROMM, Paul	258		
Independent	DI PALMA, Adel	189		
Commonwealth of Canada	VINING, Trevor I.D.	79		

Metropolitan Toronto Separate (Catholic) School Board Trustee, November 13, 1978 municipal election

Metro Ward 11 (314 out of 335 polls reporting)

- Francis Hogan 2,814
- Paul Fromm 1,813
- Joyce Frustaglio 1,762

Metropolitan Toronto Separate (Catholic) School Board Trustee, December 6, 1976 municipal election

Area 11

- Paul Fromm 2,515
- Ed Webster 1,903

Metropolitan Toronto Separate (Catholic) School Board Trustee, December 2, 1974 municipal election

Area 11

- Ed Webster 1,502
- F. Paul Fromm 1,168
- Gerry McGilly 1,136

== See also ==
- Ron Gostick
- Bernard Klatt
