= Doug Christie (lawyer) =

Canadian politician, lawyer, and far-right activist (1946–2013)

Leader of the Western Block Party
- In office November 20, 2005 – March 11, 2013
- Preceded by: Office Established
- Succeeded by: Paul St. Laurent

Personal details
- Born: Douglas Hewson Christie, Jr. April 24, 1946 Winnipeg, Manitoba, Canada
- Died: March 11, 2013 (aged 66) Victoria, British Columbia, Canada
- Party: Western Block Party (2005–2013)
- Spouse: Keltie Zubko
- Occupation: Lawyer

Douglas Hewson Christie, Jr. (April 24, 1946 – March 11, 2013) was a Canadian lawyer and political activist based in Victoria, British Columbia, who was known nationally for his defence of clients such as Holocaust denier Ernst Zündel, former Nazi prison guard Michael Seifert, and neo-Nazi Paul Fromm among others.

== Career ==
Christie was born in Winnipeg, Manitoba, and graduated from the law school of the University of British Columbia in 1970. He was the founder and general counsel of the Canadian Free Speech League and was best known for defending individuals accused of Nazi war crimes or racist, antisemitic or neo-Nazi activity. He was also the founder and leader of the Western Canada Concept, a separatist party which ran in British Columbia and federally, and the Western Block Party, a right-wing federal political party advocating the separation of British Columbia, Alberta, Saskatchewan and Manitoba from Canadian Confederation.

He first came to national attention as a lawyer in 1983 when he became James Keegstra's attorney after the schoolteacher was fired from his job and criminally charged with willfully promoting hatred by teaching his students that there was a Jewish conspiracy, along with spreading other antisemitic ideas. His defence of Keegstra brought him to the attention of Ernst Zündel who retained Christie in September 1984 to defend him against criminal charges related to Holocaust denial with co-counsel Barbara Kulaszka. Christie enlisted the assistance of outspoken civil libertarian Dr. Gary Botting, who in 1984 had published a book on George Orwell and Jehovah's Witnesses. Christie subpoenaed Dr. Botting as an expert witness to both the Zündel trial in Toronto and the Keegstra trial in Red Deer Alberta, where Botting had conducted a survey demonstrating that Keegstra could not get a fair trial in Red Deer because of pretrial publicity. The Alberta Court of Appeal ruled that the judge should have allowed Botting's evidence to be heard. Later, Botting became the first recipient of the Doug Christie's Canadian Free Speech League's George Orwell Free Speech Award. after giving up his teaching post as a professor of English at Red Deer College and entering law school. He eventually articled for Christie in Victoria, from where he worked on several of Christie's most notorious cases. However, Botting subsequently went to great lengths to distance himself from Christie. "It is clear to me that your Canadian Free Speech League is merely a front for an anti-semitic, Pro-Nazi agenda." Botting wrote in a public letter to Christie, continuing: "In the Canadian Free Speech League, the only opinions truly allowed are those which conform to your own. And those opinions, as you well know, are antisemitic and almost blatantly pro-Nazi. It is no coincidence that both you and Ernst Zündel usually celebrate your birthdays [Both are on April 24] on April 20, Hitler's Birthday. It is no coincidence that most of the Canadian Free Speech League annual awards ceremonies have been held as close to that date as possible." Christie would act as Zündel's attorney in several cases over the subsequent two decades up to Zündel's deportation from Canada in 2005. Christie's advocacy on behalf of Keegstra and Zündel led to him acting as legal counsel in a number of notable cases involving far-right figures including:

- Ernst Zündel
- Terry Long, former leader of the Aryan Nations in Canada;
- Malcolm Ross of New Brunswick who, like Keegstra, was a teacher fired for antisemitic activity;
- three alleged leaders of the Ku Klux Klan in Manitoba;
- Rudy Stanko of the World Church of the Creator;
- Tony McAleer after he was charged with broadcasting hate speech over the phone and online;
- John Ross Taylor of the Western Guard Party and Aryan Nations;
- Imre Finta who was alleged to be a Nazi war criminal and collaborator (see R v Finta);
- Doug Collins, a late newspaper columnist brought before the British Columbia Human Rights Commission for antisemitic and racist comments;
- Paul Fromm, head of the far-right "Citizens for Foreign Aid Reform" and "Canadians for Freedom of Expression", and participant in neo-Nazi and racist gatherings, who was fired from his job as a teacher for his political activity;
- Lady Jane Birdwood, a British follower of Oswald Mosley and distributor of hate propaganda;
- Wolfgang Droege of the Heritage Front;
- David Ahenakew, who acknowledged making antisemitic comments in a 2002 interview with the Saskatoon StarPhoenix
- Jack Klundert, a Windsor, Ontario optometrist who does not believe the Constitution of Canada grants the Federal Government the power to collect income tax

Christie posted material on the former website operated by Bernard Klatt, on what The Globe and Mail called "Canada's most notorious source of hate propaganda".

In addition to his extensive work on freedom of expression cases, Christie participated in wide range of causes touching on issues of individual liberties more generally. He represented numerous individuals in civil actions against the police, in an effort to ensure police accountability, and in 1987 successfully represented Gary Botting in a defamation suit against Canadian Broadcasting Corporation (CBC).

"There is a growing gulf between the police and public trust, which can only be fixed and crossed with any hope of restoration of faith when the police are judged for their conduct by the public themselves and not by their constant co-workers in the system itself", Christie wrote in a letter to the Victoria Times-Colonist. "The essential ingredient of a society where citizens and police are in agreement on the enforcement of the law is simply that the law applies to police and citizens in equal measure. The police cannot be above the law. With the present system of accountability, that impression is well-founded."

Christie also acted in child apprehension cases, most notably that of Paul and Zabeth Bayne, a Hope, BC couple whose children were seized by the Ministry of Children and Family Development for four years, then eventually returned.

From 2007 to 2010, Christie represented Bruce and Donna Montague in a constitutional challenge of Canada's gun registry and other firearms laws. The constitutional challenge was ultimately dismissed by the Ontario Court of Appeal, but Christie continued to represent the Montagues in their efforts to resist civil and criminal forfeiture applications by the Crown.

In January 2012, Christie became the first lawyer to successfully challenge an application under British Columbia's Civil Forfeiture Act, when the BC Supreme Court found that the retroactive forfeiture of a truck subsequent to a criminal prosecution was "clearly not in the interests of justice". This decision was upheld on appeal.

In September 2012, Christie successfully defended Terry Tremaine, a Regina math instructor charged under Section 319(2) of the Criminal Code, by establishing that there had been unreasonable delay in bringing the case against him to trial.

== Politics ==
Christie became leader of British Columbia's provincial WCC and led it through provincial elections in that province through the 1980s and 1990s. Christie never won a seat at the provincial or federal level, nor did the BC WCC ever win any seats in the provincial elections it contested. Christie continued to run an organization with the "Western Canada Concept" name up to the time of his death, but it is no longer a registered political party, even at the provincial level in British Columbia, which has relatively lax party registration laws.

In 2005, Christie announced his intention to form a new federal political party to be called the Western Block Party which would be a Western Canadian version of the Bloc Québécois in that its role in the House of Commons of Canada would be to act as a regional separatist party.

The WCC and WBP are not affiliated with the Separation Party of Alberta or the Western Independence Party of Saskatchewan. Officials in these parties have distanced themselves from Christie – for example, they do not include links to the WCC or WBP on their websites even though the SPA and WIPS do link to one another.

The WBP was officially registered with Elections Canada prior to the 2006 federal election. Christie ran in the riding of Esquimalt—Juan de Fuca in British Columbia, finishing fifth in a field of six.

== Canadian Free Speech League ==
Christie was general counsel for an organization called the Canadian Free Speech League (CFSL), which has presented its "George Orwell Award" to controversial figures including BC columnist Doug Collins, who authored an article titled Swindler's List attacking Steven Spielberg's Holocaust film Schindler's List.

== Professional misconduct ==
=== Law Society of Upper Canada ===
The Law Society of Upper Canada looked into disciplining Christie for his conduct during the Imre Finta trial. The Society's discipline chair, Harvey Strosberg, declined to issue a complaint against Christie but stressed that Christie's remarks during the trial "clearly disclose that he has crossed the line separating counsel from client: he has made common cause with a small, lunatic, anti-Semitic fringe element in our society. We know who Mr. Christie is. Suffering Mr. Christie's words and opinions is part of the price one pays for upholding and cherishing freedom of speech in a free and democratic society. And society must be willing to accept this price. Mr. Christie's anti-Semitic comments were not akin to the cry of fire in a crowded theatre. His theatre was mostly empty."

=== The Law Society of British Columbia ===
On 11 September 2007, The Law Society of British Columbia issued a hearing report finding that Christie had committed professional misconduct in his civil litigation practice by seeking, from a hospital, a bank, and a traveller cheque company, private health and financial records without a court order. The panel noted that prior to this incident, Christie's professional conduct record had been unblemished for over 30 years. The panel accepted that Christie's professional misconduct arose out of stress and an excessive zeal to help his client, rather than a desire for personal gain. The panel therefore imposed a fine on Christie of $2,500.

== Death ==
Christie was diagnosed with prostate cancer in 2011 and died of metastatic liver disease in Victoria's Royal Jubilee Hospital in 2013.

== Electoral record ==
By-election on 29 September 1986 Electoral district of Pembina
Party	Candidate	Votes
Progressive Conservative	Walter van de Walle	16,525
New Democratic	Ivor Dent	16,251
Liberal	Chris Seirson	6,505
Independent	Doug Christie	2,765
Independent	Ernie Jamison	1,241
Confederation of Regions	Elmer Knutson	926
Independent	Anne McBride	423

2006 Canadian federal election: Esquimalt—Juan de Fuca
Party	Candidate	Votes	%	±%	Expenditures
Liberal	Keith Martin	20,761	34.93	–0.36	$77,288.02
New Democratic	Randall Garrison	18,595	31.29	+0.67	$74,284.67
Conservative	Troy DeSouza	16,327	27.47	+3.31	$76,237.04
Green	Mike Robinson	3,385	5.70	–3.55	$1,911.22
Western Block	Doug Christie	272	0.46	–	$97.73
Canadian Action	David Piney	89	0.15	–0.11	$3,523.26
Total valid votes/expense limit		59,429	99.81	–	$84,072.71
Total rejected ballots		112	0.19	–0.07	
Turnout		59,541	68.08	+2.15	
Eligible voters		87,456			
Liberal hold		Swing		–0.52	
Source: Elections Canada

Preceded by Party Created	Leader of the Western Block Party; 2005–2013	Succeeded by Paul St. Laurent
