= Imre Finta =

Hungarian Nazi collaborator (1912–2003)

Imre Finta (2 September 1912 – 1 December 2003) was the first person prosecuted under Canada's war crimes legislation. He was charged in 1987 and acquitted in 1990.

== Early life ==
Finta was born in Kolozsvár (modern-day Cluj-Napoca, Romania). He studied law at a university in Szeged in the 1930s. In 1935 he enrolled at the Royal Hungarian Military Academy. He was commissioned as a second lieutenant in the Royal Hungarian Gendarmerie on January 1, 1939, and was promoted to the rank of captain on April 5, 1942.

Imre Finta was a commander of the Gendarmerie in Szeged, Hungary, during the Second World War. He immigrated to Canada in 1948 and settled in Toronto in 1953, where he bought a restaurant. He later operated a catering business. Finta became a Canadian citizen in 1956. During the late 1970s Finta worked at Glen Abbey Golf Club in Oakville, Ontario.

== War crimes prosecution ==
Finta was accused of committing manslaughter, kidnapping, unlawful confinement and robbery in relation to his alleged activities as a police officer assisting the Nazis in the forced deportation of 8,617 Jews from Szeged during the Holocaust.

Finta was defended by lawyers Doug Christie and Barbara Kulaszka and was supported by far-right figures such as Ernst Zündel. Finta's defence argued that he only followed orders and was only responsible for transporting Jews.

Finta was acquitted after a six-month jury trial. The acquittal was upheld in a 3-2 vote by the Ontario Court of Appeal in 1992, and a 4-3 vote by the Supreme Court of Canada in 1993. Justice Peter Cory, writing on behalf of the Supreme Court, said "Even where the orders are manifestly unlawful, the defence of obedience to superior orders and the peace-officer defence will be available in those circumstances where the accused had no moral choice as to whether to follow the order." Among the reasons for the Supreme Court accepting Finta's defence were that there was "Jewish sentiment in favour of the Allied forces" and Finta himself believed "the Jews were subversive and disloyal to the war efforts of Hungary."

The decision brought to an end of prosecutions under Canada's nascent war crimes legislation. Thereafter, the government attempted to deal with alleged war criminals by stripping them of their Canadian citizenship and deporting them to the country in which the alleged crime occurred.

Holocaust survivor Sabina Citron prevailed in a civil lawsuit for libel against Finta, after Finta called her a liar for saying he had committed war crimes.

== Death ==
On December 1, 2003, Finta died in his sleep at a nursing home in Toronto, Ontario.

== See also ==
- R v Finta
- Deschênes Commission
- Vladimir Katriuk
