= R v Finta =

- Supreme Court of Canada

Hearing: June 2, 3, 1993 Judgment: March 24, 1994
- Full case name: Her Majesty The Queen v Imre Finta
- Citations: {{{citations}}}
- Ruling: Appeal dismissed.

Court membership
- Chief Justice: Antonio Lamer; Puisne Justices: Gérard La Forest, Claire L'Heureux-Dubé, John Sopinka, Charles Gonthier, Peter Cory, Beverley McLachlin, Frank Iacobucci, John C. Major

Reasons given
- Majority: Cory J, joined by Gonthier and Major JJ
- Concurrence: Lamer CJ
- Dissent: La Forest J, joined by L'Heureux-Dubé and McLachlin JJ

R v Finta, [1994] 1 SCR 701 is a case decided by the Supreme Court of Canada. The Court found that a 45-year delay before charging an individual under the crimes against humanity provisions of the Criminal Code does not fall within the meaning of "unreasonable delay" under the Canadian Charter of Rights and Freedoms. The period for "unreasonable delay" begins from the point that charges are laid.

== Background ==
Imre Finta was a commander of the Gendarmerie in Szeged, Hungary, during World War II. After the war, he immigrated to Canada and became a citizen in 1956. Evidence was discovered which suggested he may have participated in the deportation of Jews from Hungary during the war. In 1988, he was charged with unlawful confinement, robbery, kidnapping and manslaughter under the war crimes provisions in the Criminal Code.

During the pre-trial, Finta's lawyers, Doug Christie and Barbara Kulaszka, challenged the constitutionality of the criminal charges as a violation of section 11(b) of the Charter. The judge rejected this claim. However, at trial, the jury acquitted him on all counts. On the appeal by the Crown, the trial judgment was upheld including the dismissal of the Charter claim.

The Crown appealed the decision to the Supreme Court which upheld the decision in 1994.

In the earlier decision of R v Finta, [1993] 1 SCR 1138 the Supreme Court granted standing to intervene to the Human Rights League of B'nai B'rith Canada, the Canadian Jewish Congress and InterAmicus.

== Opinion of the Court ==
The majority, written by Cory J, found that the delay did not engage section 11(b) of the Charter as the period of "unreasonable delay" begins at the time the charge is laid. A delay of 45 years, in fact, favours the accused as the memory of witnesses will be limited. Reasonableness depends, in part, on the amount of investigative work that it involved. Here, where investigation will easily stretch into years, a length of time amounting to 45 years is not beyond reason.

Cory also found that the provisions did not violate section seven of the Charter as the delay was not contrary to any principles of fundamental justice. Nor was there a violation of sections 11(a), 11(d), 11(g), 12 or 15.

Section 11(g) was particularly notable as it allowed Canadian courts to apply Canadian criminal law for acts that occurred outside of the country, but only where the acts were considered war crimes.

== See also ==
- List of Supreme Court of Canada cases
- Deschênes Commission
