= Verna Patronella Johnston =

Ojibwe community leader, mentor, activist

- Johnston working in the kitchen
- Born: February 15, 1909; Cape Croker, Ontario, Canada
- Died: 1996 (aged 86–87)
- Occupations: activist, storyteller, cook, foster parent

Verna Patronella Johnston (1909-1996) was an Ojibway and Potawatomi (Anishinaabe) author, mother, grandmother, mentor, and community activist, known for helping Indigenous youth who had travelled to the city of Toronto for secondary and post-secondary educational opportunities from the 1960s through to the 1980s. She became an important leader within the urban Indigenous community in the city.

== Biography ==
Verna Patronella Johnston was born on Cape Croker reserve (Neyaashiinigmiing) in 1909. Her father Peter Nadjiwon was Ojibway and Potawatomi and her mother Charlotte Penn was English, Irish and Scotch. She was the third eldest of 14 children. She recalled spending much of her childhood with her great-grandmother, a Mary LaVallée. After her marriage she spent time in Toronto with her husband, where she was able to find wage work in a bakery and the city's factories. She spent many years at Cape Croker working as a foster parent where she was able to support herself following her separation from her husband. She was also involved in her local Homemaker's Clubs and Women's Institute. In 1965, two of her granddaughters wished to attend business courses at a local college in the city. Aware that Indigenous youth often faced hostility and struggled with social acceptance at local boarding houses, she rented a third floor apartment on Broadview Avenue near the Riverdale Zoo where she lived there with her granddaughters In time she hosted many more Indigenous boarders and in 1966 relocated to North York where she rented a large house on Blythwood Road from lithographer Roy Ramsay, running a boarding house for young women, but later accepted young men. In 1972 she relocated to McGill Street before closing her operations in 1973. During this time she also published a collection of stories passed down to her through the oral tradition, Tales of Nokomis. Johnston's work offering safe, secure and culturally relevant housing to Indigenous youth was part of a larger social movement related to building community and counteracting discriminatory housing practices in the city. In addition to taking in young women studying in the city, Johnston also took in youth fleeing abusive foster homes and seeking sanctuary. Boarders with Johnston would go on to become educators, social workers, librarians, and community activists. In 1977 she collaborated with Rosamond Vanderburgh to publish a biography of her life, titled I am Nokomis too. She was also a founding member of and volunteer with many Indigenous organizations that started in the city including the Native Canadian Centre of Toronto, the Indian-Eskimo Association of Canada, The Council Fire, Anduhyaun House, Anishnawbe Health Toronto, and the Wigwamen housing agency. She also led a program teaching crafts on reserves funded through Indian Affairs and later taught courses at Sheridan College, York University, and Seneca College.

Johnston moved home to Cape Croker several times after being diagnosed with Hodgkin's disease, but eventually returned to Toronto where she was hired as housekeeper at Anduhyaun House, a hostel for Indigenous women. There she taught crafts, cooking, and household management to residents, as well as running public workshops for more general audiences. She continued to be a vocal community activist, speaking out against discrimination within the Children's Aid Society, where white foster homes were paid double what she received as an Indigenous foster parent.

== Family ==
Verna learned traditional medicines and oral storytelling from her great-grandmother Mary Lavalée and her grandmother, whose family name was Jones. At the age of sixteen, she married Henry Johnston on September 15, 1926 in Wiarton, Ontario. She had five children.

== Awards ==
- 1976. Indian Woman of the Year. Native Women's Association.

== Publications ==
- Johnston, Patronella. Tales of Nokomis. illustrations by Francis Kagige. Don Mills, Ont: Musson Book, 1975.

== Other sources ==
- I am Nokomis, too: the biography of Verna Patronella Johnston by Rosamond M. Vanderburgh. Don Mills: General Publishing Company, 1977.
