= Bloor Street Culture Corridor =

Arts and cultural organizations in Toronto, Canada

Coordinates: 43.6678°N 79.3986°W

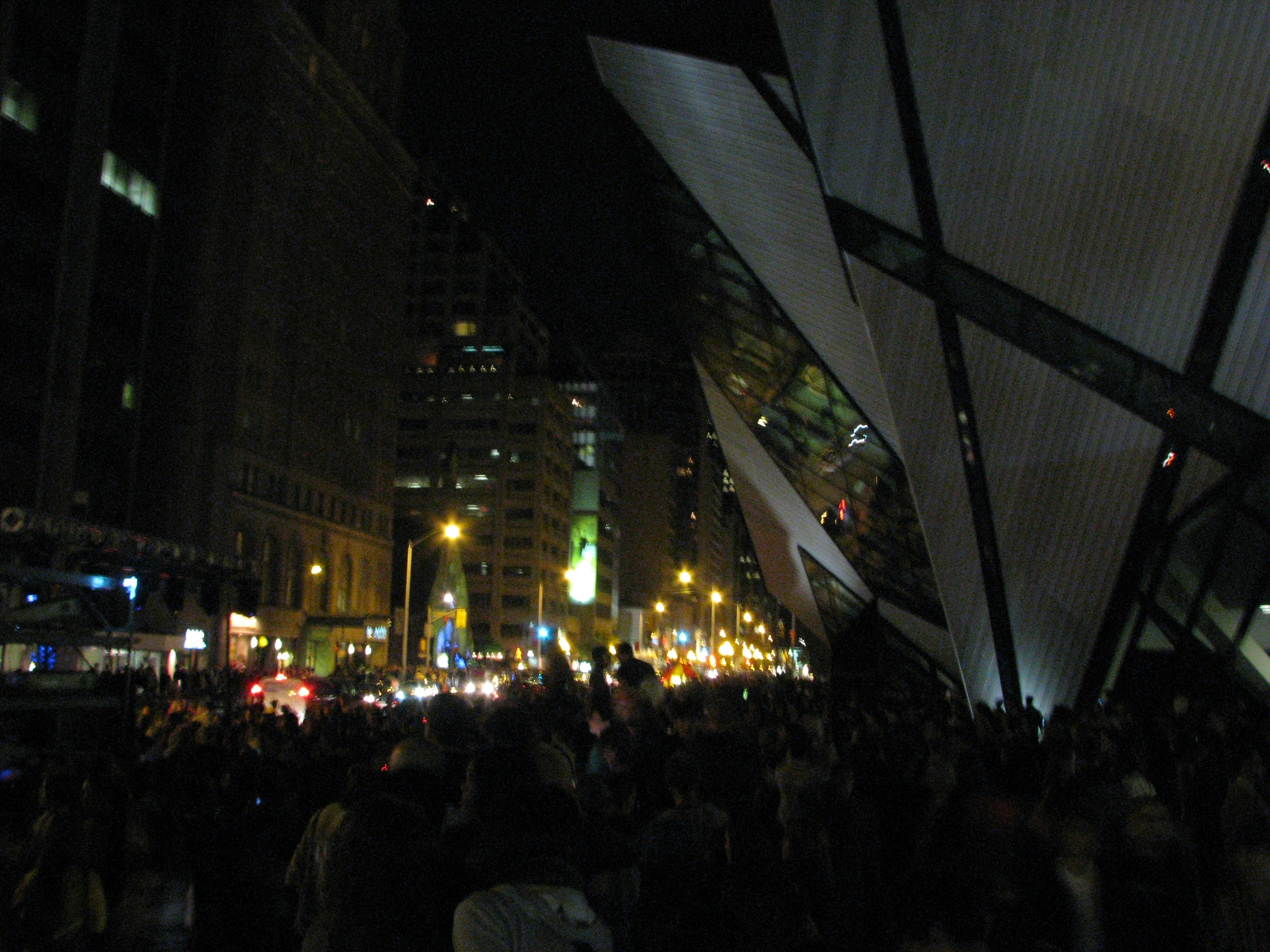
Crowds for Nuit Blanche outside the Royal Ontario Museum, near the intersections for Avenue Road and Bloor Street. The intersection is located within the Bloor Street Culture Corridor.

The Bloor Street Culture Corridor is a cluster of arts and cultural organizations in Toronto, Ontario, Canada. It is located on Bloor Street West, between Bathurst and Yonge streets.

The corridor has a wide variety of art genres, from museum experiences to films, art exhibitions to music concerts. The area also is culturally diverse, including Aboriginal, French, Jewish, Italian, Japanese, Estonian, African and Caribbean arts and culture.

Officially launched in April 2014, the collective shares a website, social media and a mobile app to promote exhibitions at its member institutions. In 2016, the corridor was successful in working with the Toronto municipal government to have the section of Bloor Street West designated an official City of Toronto cultural corridor. Each year more than three million persons visit the corridor's arts and culture destinations, and attend exhibitions, performances, and events. Together, the Bloor Street Culture Corridor organizations employ more than 5,500 culture workers and generate more than $629,500,000 in economic impact each year.

== Members ==
Bloor St. Culture Corridor Partner Destinations

- Alliance Française de Toronto
- Bata Shoe Museum
- A Different Booklist Cultural Centre
- Hot Docs Ted Rogers Cinema
- Gardiner Museum
- Istituto Italiano di Cultura
- The Japan Foundation, Toronto
- Miles Nadal Jewish Community Centre
- Museum of Estonians Abroad (VEMU)
- Native Canadian Centre of Toronto
- Randolph Centre for the Arts
- The Royal Conservatory of Music / Koerner Hall
- Royal Ontario Museum (ROM)
- Soundstreams
- Tafelmusik Baroque Orchestra and Chamber Choir
- The Toronto Consort
- Toronto Reference Library
- University of Toronto Faculty of Music
- 918 Bathurst Centre for Culture, Arts, Media + Education
