= Rodney Bobiwash =

Anishinaabe First-Nations activist and scholar

A. Rodney Bobiwash
- Wacoquaakmik
- Born: 9 July 1959; Blind River, Ontario
- Died: 13 January 2002 (aged 42)
- Spouse: Heather Howard

Academic background
- Education: Wolfson College, Oxford

Academic work
- Discipline: Historian

Alan Rodney Bobiwash (1959–2002) was an Anishinaabe First-Nations activist and scholar for Indigenous histories, racial equality, and social justice. He taught at the University of Manitoba, Trent University, and the University of Toronto. At the University of Toronto, he also directed First Nations House and Aboriginal Student Services (1994–97), paving the way for expanded First Nations student support in education.

Bobiwash was deeply involved in the anti-racist movement. He was instrumental in launching a Canadian Human Rights Commission case against the far-right organisation Heritage Front, which contributed significantly to its eventual demise. He also founded Klan Busters hotline to monitor and prevent white supremacist activity in Toronto.

Bobiwash's work on Indigenous self-government and relations spanned a broad range of constituencies across borders. Locally, he provided consultation and resources in support of urban Indigenous self-government and institutional relations. Internationally, he frequently represented and mediated on behalf of various Indigenous and anti-racist communities, at forums including the United Nations and the World Trade Organisation. In the late 1990s, he directed the Native Canadian Centre of Toronto as well as the Forum for Global Exchange and the Biocultural Security Directorate at the Centre for World Indigenous Studies.

His legacies include the Toronto Native Community History Project (now First Story Toronto) and its highlight, the "Great Indian Bus Tour" (now First Story Toronto Tours). The Project was started alongside Heather Howard at the Native Canadian Centre in 1995, and acted "to preserve and promote the history of Aboriginal people in the Toronto area" and "to teach and share in the spirit of friendship, and with the goal of eliminating racism and prejudice".

== Life ==
=== Early years ===
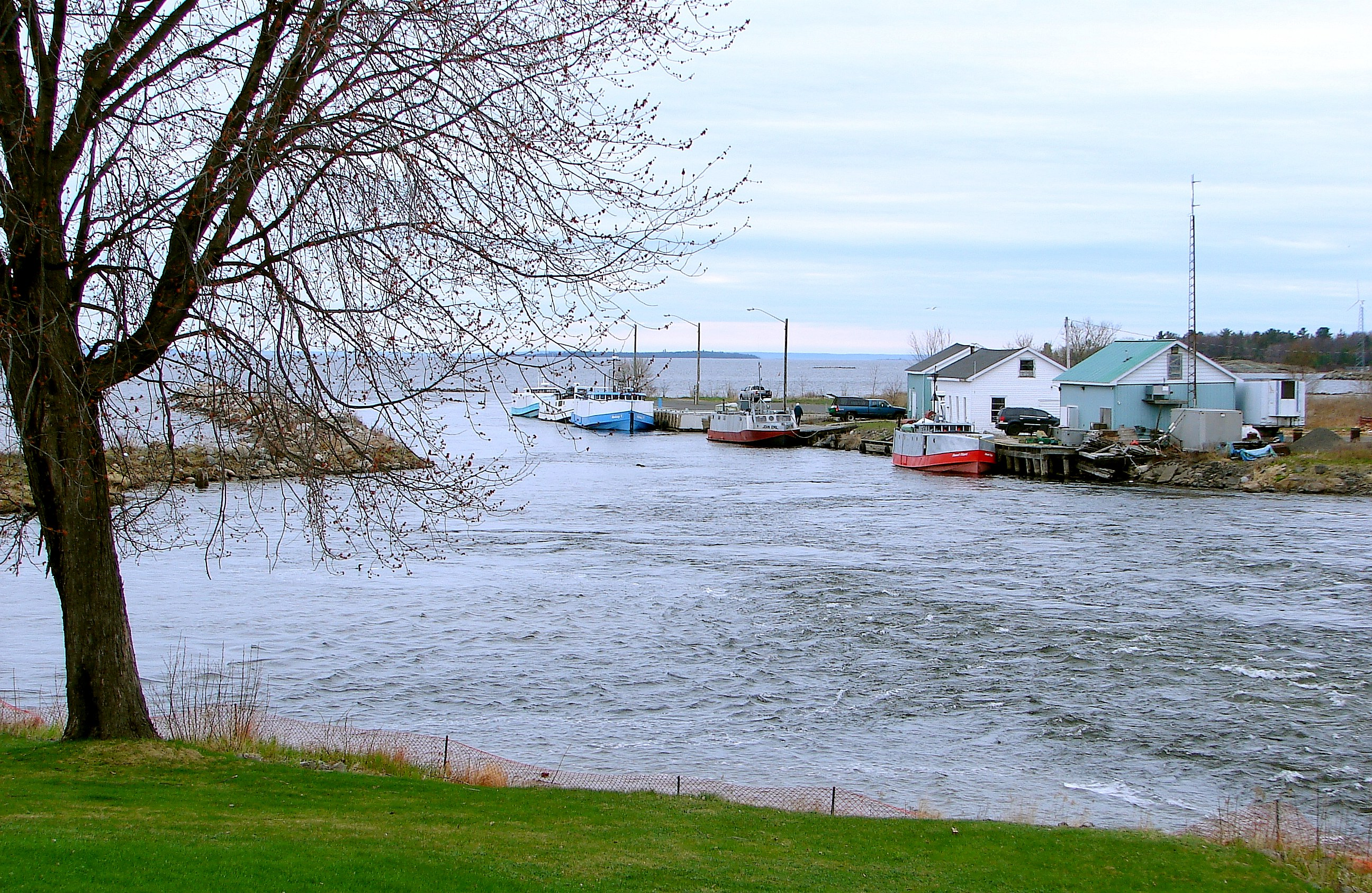
Harbour of Blind River, Ontario

A. Rodney Bobiwash was born in 1959 to the Anishinaabe Bear Clan of the Mississauga First Nation on the north shore of Lake Huron, in Blind River, Ontario. His Anishinabek name, Wacoquaakmik, meant "the breath of the land". In his youth, he spent some time in foster care on a farm near Sudbury, Ontario. He attended Garson-Falconbridge Secondary School and graduated in 1978.

Bobiwash went on to study at Trent University, where he was named Bata Scholar and awarded the Native Studies Prize. He wrote a thesis on the economic and social history of Pinehouse, Saskatchewan, and graduated with an Honours Bachelor of Arts in Native Studies. He then read history at Wolfson College, Oxford, becoming the first Indigenous student sponsored by the Canadian government for graduate studies at the University of Oxford. There he wrote on the topic of Métis, Indian, and Company Regulations in the Post-Monopoly Era: The English River Fur Trade District, 1870–1885. He was briefly a resident fellow at the D'Arcy McNickle Center for American Indian and Indigenous Studies at Newberry Library.

In 1987, Bobiwash taught at the University of Manitoba as a part-time lecturer in Native Studies. From 1988 to 1990 he taught at Trent University, encouraging his students to actively engage in issues facing the Native community. In 1989, he joined the efforts of the Anishinaabe in Temagami to stop the construction of a logging road through ancestral hunting grounds while their land claim was still before the Supreme Court. He was discouraged from joining by the head of the Native Studies program, who expressed concern that his participation would "reflect as badly on the department as if he were seen drunk at a local tavern." Bobiwash joined regardless. He was arrested and detained twice, and subsequently banned from the Sudbury and Nippissing areas until his trial. The charges were dropped. In 1990, Trent's Native Studies program decided not to rehire Bobiwash, citing "ongoing concerns about [Bobiwash's] teaching effectiveness." Students circulated petitions to protest the decision, stating that Bobiwash was "dismissed" for his participation in civil disobedience, not due to a shortcoming in teaching.

=== Indigenous self-government and relations work ===
For the next few years Bobiwash stepped away from academic teaching. He moved to Toronto, worked at the Ontario Indian Commission, and began to volunteer at the Native Canadian Centre of Toronto (NCCT). From 1991 to 1993, Bobiwash was employed at the NCCT as Policy Analyst and Native Self-Government and Anti-Racism Coordinator. From 1991 to 1998 he also ran Mukwa Ode, a First Nations consulting group that worked with Indigenous and non-Indigenous clients in a number of different areas. Mukwa Ode worked closely with the Greater Toronto Aboriginal Management Board (GTAMB; now Miziwe Biik). Its projects included the publication of the Toronto Urban Native Self-Government Handbook and a review of the perception of policing in Toronto's Indigenous community.

In the mid-1990s, he was one of the only two non-lawyers appointed by the Ontario government as Adjudicator with the Ontario Human Rights Commission. He was appointed in 1992 and reappointed in 1995. (Note: As confirmed through Bobiwash's professional records in: University of Toronto Archives. A. Rodney Bobiwash fonds. B2012-0006/032(22))

==== Anti-racism ====
Bobiwash was highly active in the Canadian anti-racist movement. In 1992, he played a pivotal role in launching a Canadian Human Rights Commission complaint against the far-right organisation Heritage Front, contributing significantly to its eventual demise. Elisa Hategan, a past member of the Heritage Front and now defector, has been quoted as saying:

Rodney did more to shut down hate than any other anti-racism activist back then... I wasn't part of [Heritage Front's] strategy to terrorize activists, but I was aware of it... When I had to go into hiding, though, he helped save my life. He enlisted six members of the American Indian Movement to keep me safe when I went to court. He gave me money, let me stay in his apartment and took me out to dinner.

Bobiwash founded a group called Klan Busters at the NCCT, which sought to combat the influence of Ku Klux Klan and affiliated white supremacist organisations in Ontario, Quebec, and the Prairie provinces. Klan Busters monitored and prevented white supremacist activity across Toronto, and operated an anti-racist hotline. As a result, Bobiwash was frequently the target of death threats and harassment campaigns which at one point required him to be placed under 24-hour police protection. Mail to Bobiwash included "phoney herpes test results, a scrawl that endorses Native gas sniffing, and an ad for the film Last of the Mohicans with the written comment: "Probably died of an alcohol-soaked liver."" He was nonetheless known to meet harassment with humour, in one instance agreeing to coffee with the leader of Heritage Front in the courthouse's basement cafeteria before the court date. On another occasion, when details came out during the court case that a member of the hate group had been charged for doughnut-store robbery, Bobiwash "came to the proceedings with a big box of doughnuts and started distributing them, to the great merriment of the spectators."

==== Community education and history ====
From 1994 to 1997, Bobiwash took on a dual role at the University of Toronto as the Director of First Nations House and as coordinator for the Office of Aboriginal Student Services and Programs. In these roles, he worked to expand community services and support for First Nations students. He also briefly resumed teaching in the Aboriginal Studies program from 1996 to 1997.

In 1995, Bobiwash and Heather Howard started the Toronto Native Community History Project (now First Story Toronto) at the NCCT and began sharing the knowledge through a "Great Indian Bus Tour" (now First Story Toronto Tours). The community history project was modelled on a similar initiative in Oakland, California. It began to collect oral histories of the city's Indigenous residents and preserve in its own archive, combine scholarly and community-based knowledge, and legitimise "non-reserve based Native peoples' claims to Aboriginal rights and sovereignty".

==== Indigenous relations and solidarity work ====
Throughout his life, Bobiwash organised, addressed, and participated in numerous conferences, seminars, and workshops around the world to represent various First Nations and Anti-Racist organisations. The international forums included the United Nations and the World Trade Organisation. He travelled to numerous countries including Siberia, Mexico, and Colombia, often to mediate on behalf of Indigenous Peoples. In 1998, Bobiwash became Director of the NCCT and, shortly after, Director of the Forum for Global Exchange and the Biocultural Security Directorate at the Centre for World Indigenous Studies. He received the 25th Anniversary Award from the Urban Alliance on Race Relations in the year 2000.

Almost to the end of his life, he maintained a Friday-evening vigil at the Colombian consulate for Kimy Pernía Domicó. Pernía was an Embera Katío activist who was disappeared soon after returning home from the Quebec People's Summit of April 2001. He opposed the Urra hydroelectric dam on the Sinú River that flooded crops and sacred sites in his people's territory. He had visited Canada on a number of occasions to testify on the devastation caused by the project, which was partially financed by Export Development Canada using Canadian tax revenue.

== Legacy ==
When Bobiwash passed on January 13, 2002, a three-day vigil was held at the NCCT in his memory with 700 in attendance. Bobiwash was honoured by the Colombian activists at their consul protest. In February 2002, Toronto City Council recognised the passing of Bobiwash through a condolence motion moved by Councillor Jane Pitfield and seconded by Councillor Kyle Rae. "Sincere sympathies" were conveyed to "his wife Heather Howard-Bobiwash, his mother Alice Bobiwash and his sisters and brothers, and the Toronto Aboriginal Community."

=== Toronto Native Community History Project ===
In 1995, the Toronto Native Community History Project was established at the Native Canadian Centre of Toronto (NCCT) by a group of Indigenous community members and non-Indigenous allies, through the leadership of Rodney Bobiwash and Heather Howard. The Project's mandate was:

To hold faith with out ancestors; To speak our memory. To preserve and promote the history of Aboriginal people in the Toronto area from time immemorial to the present, and for the future. To teach and share in the spirit of friendship, and with the goal of eliminating racism and prejudice.

Foundational to this collection were materials donated by Anglican Church Women to Indigenous woman and housing advocate Mildred (Millie) Redmond in 1976. Redmond received the materials in her capacity as director at Anduhyaun, a women's shelter she helped found in 1968 and the first of its kind in Canada. Thereafter, the collection was passed to the NCCT and enriched with many more contemporary Indigenous art, artefacts, archival material, and oral history recordings. (Note: While the collection eventually came to be stewarded by projects at NCCT, it is unclear when or why the collection came to be in the NCCT's possession. Krmpotich et al. (2015) speculate that it was "likely through [Redmond's] close association with [NCCT's] active women’s group, among whom were other members with connections to Anduhyaun" (349).) With the development of the Toronto Native Community History Project through the 1990s and 2000s, various initiatives began to elaborate the Indigenous histories of Toronto. These initiatives included community history classes, publications, oral history projects, and a bus tour of the city from Indigenous perspectives. In 2013, the collection was made the focus of a community engagement research project called "Memory, Meaning-Making, and Collections (MMMC)" which encourages seniors to "[remember and re-tell] urban Aboriginal experiences, history and heritage, including the experiences of residential schooling."

The historical collection is now stewarded by First Story Toronto at the NCCT, and the bus tour has been adapted into a mobile app that "re-places Indigenous histories back onto the geography of Toronto and maps current cultural events." The app was launched in October 2012 at the ImagineNATIVE Film and Media Arts Festival.

==== "The Great Indian Bus Tour" ====
Among the Toronto Native Community History Project's programs was a five-hour bus tour led by Rodney Bobiwash, which began in 1995 as "The Great Indian Bus Tour of Toronto". Since there was, at the time, "little to no acknowledgement of Indigenous presence (past or present) in Toronto", the tour combined scholarly research with community oral histories to tell the missing stories of the city's Indigenous past and present. The tour was cited in planning scholarship that emphasises the need to make space for diverse urban histories, as follows:

The late Native historian, Rodney Bobiwash, used to offer a tour called "The Great Indian Bus Tour of Toronto." The bus stopped at familiar sites, like Casa Loma and High Park, but the stories Bobiwash told about the historical significance of these sites is not visible, not even noted on a plaque. The history of the First Nations has been all but obliterated. In the east end of the city, the bus stopped in what appeared to be a typical Scarborough suburb: single-family ranch-style homes spread far and wide. In the midst of this otherwise flat landscape was what appeared to be a small park composed of an unusually high grass-covered hill. A common reaction on the bus was that it looked like it would be great for sledding. No doubt many of the children in the area think the same thing. But this is also a sacred burial mound that pre-dates the arrival of Europeans. Before leaving the bus, Bobiwash would give each tour participant a small packet of loose tobacco to scatter to the four directions to honour the dead as they climbed up the long, steep sides of the collective grave. At the top, there is a small plaque on a boulder. How many of those living nearby have hiked to the top and read the plaque? How many are oblivious? Whose history we preserve, and how, is critical to our collective understanding of who we are and what makes a good city. Native artists are just beginning to mark the urban landscape with other reminders of their long, yet largely ignored history, like the local Na Me Res (Native Men's Residence) mural that reads "Celebrating 20,000 years of being in the neighbourhood."

The bus tour was considered important and necessary by many Indigenous and non-Indigenous residents of Toronto, and continued after Bobiwash's passing in 2002. Ongoing collaboration at First Story Toronto has expanded Bobiwash's original tour to offer a series of bus and walking tours across the Greater Toronto Area (GTA).

== Selected works ==
- "The History of Native People in the Toronto Area: An Overview." In The Meeting Place: Aboriginal Life in Toronto, edited by Frances Sanderson and Heather Howard-Bobiwash, 5-24. Toronto: Native Canadian Centre of Toronto, 1997.
- "Native Urban Self-Government in Toronto and the Politics of Self-Determination." In The Meeting Place: Aboriginal Life in Toronto, edited by Frances Sanderson and Heather Howard-Bobiwash, 84-94. Toronto: Native Canadian Centre of Toronto, 1997.
- "1995: Ontario's Summer of Hate and the Development of an Anti-Indian Movement". Akwasasne Notes 2, no. 2 (1997): 13. Cornwall Island Reserve, Rooseveltown, NY
