= Bernard Klatt =

Bernard Klatt is a former Canadian internet service provider who ran what has been called "Canada's most notorious source of hate propaganda". In 1996, his Fairview Technology Centre in Oliver, British Columbia hosted websites for "at least 12 groups promoting white supremacy and hate against minorities" according to the Simon Wiesenthal Centre. The sites included the Heritage Front, the Euro-Canadian Defence League and the Canadian Patriot's Network - hosted at the Freedom Site, which is run by Marc Lemire as well as Skin-Net, White Power Skinheads, Berserk, New Order and Nordland. A preface page to the site warned the "racially weak-at-heart" not to go any further if they are offended. The local cable TV company subsequently cut off Fairview's cable access and ordered Klatt to get his server computer out of its offices.

Tyrone Mills, a former employee of Klatt's, told the media that Klatt gave him literature from the White Aryan Resistance and invited him to an Aryan Nations compound at Hayden Lake, Idaho. "I said no, I had no interest at all, and that was that," said Mills, who worked for Klatt for seven months. "Another time he asked me, in 1995, to manage his (business) while he was down in Hayden Lake." Mills also said that Klatt voiced racist views at work and once asked him to take the literature to a friend.

In 1998, Klatt organized a meeting in the Okanagan town, coinciding with the United Nations International Day for the Elimination of Racism, featuring Doug Collins, Doug Christie, Eileen Pressler and Paul Fromm. 40 members of the rural community picketed the meeting which was attended by a handful of people.

Klatt's internet service was closed in 1998 when BC Tel informed him of their refusal to accept legal liability for it.
