= Confederation of Regions Party of Canada candidates in the 1988 Canadian federal election =

The Confederation of Regions Party of Canada fielded several candidates in the 1988 federal election, none of whom were elected.

== Ontario ==
=== S. Brent Ridley (Sudbury) ===
Ridley was an instrumentation technician. He was a vocal opponent of official bilingualism and the proposed Meech Lake Accord, and was quoted as saying that "the French are going to be controlling every government office" as the result of federal legislation. He received 3,391 votes (7.97%), finishing fourth against Liberal Party candidate Diane Marleau.

== Alberta ==
=== Brent Morin (Calgary West) ===
Morin was listed as a construction worker. He received 170 votes (0.31%), finishing sixth against Progressive Conservative incumbent James Hawkes. Future Prime Minister of Canada Stephen Harper finished second. Morin later received a passing reference in a "Harper's index" column published by the National Post newspaper during 2004 federal election (26 June 2004).
