= UK Picture Editors' Guild =

British trade association

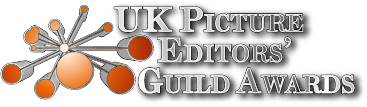
- Abbreviation: UKPEG
- Formation: 5 December 1977; 48 years ago
- Type: Photo and video journalism organisation
- Headquarters: Wickford, Essex, United Kingdom
- Members: 158
- Chairman: Alan Sparrow (since 2004)
- Website: https://pictureeditorsguildawards.co.uk/

The UK Picture Editors' Guild is an association for British picture editors, based in Wickford, Essex, United Kingdom.

== History ==
The guild was formed in 1977 by picture editors working for British national and regional newspapers and picture agencies, with the inaugural meeting on 5 December. Membership was initially restricted to picture editors and their deputies. Later, the membership was opened to other members of the picture desk and then widened to include picture researchers and others whose daily work is involved in editorial photography.

The guild has a membership of more than 100 and is run by a chair and a committee. It meets two or three times a year for social occasions, including a go karting event held at Buckmore Park.

== Awards ceremony ==
The Guild also runs the Picture Editors' Awards. The awards are held in the Honourable Artillery Company headquarters, and attempt to show some of the most newsworthy and important photographs of the preceding year. The judging panel includes representatives from newspapers such as The Daily Telegraph, The Times and The Independent on Sunday. By 2016, the guild was receiving about 2,000 entries which were trimmed to a selection to just over 40.

The 2012 award was won by Jason Howe with his battlefield images photographed in Afghanistan. The 2014 nominations included a photograph of German figure skaters Nelli Zhiganshina and Alexander Gazsi at the 2014 Winter Olympics in Sochi. Nominations for the 2017 award include a picture of the British Prime Minister Theresa May laughing (photographed by the London Evening Standard's Jeremy Selwyn), Leader of the Opposition Jeremy Corbyn travelling to a campaign in Scotland, and a photograph of Grenfell Tower in flames.
