= Canadian Heritage Alliance =

Canadian white supremacist group

The Canadian Heritage Alliance (CHA) was a Canadian white supremacist group founded in Kitchener-Waterloo, Ontario. Detective Terry Murphy of London's Hate Crime Unit alleged that the group had links with the Heritage Front and the Kitchener/Waterloo/Cambridge-based Tri-City Skins.

Its former leader, Melissa Guille, denied that the organization was a hate group, and contends that the group and its website are concerned about "keeping Canada for Canadians" and "removing the anti-white sentiment in society". A 2001 report from B'nai Brith Canada said the CHA "seems to be an attempt to fill the void left by the diminishing Heritage Front". Staff Sgt. Gary Askin of the Waterloo Regional Police Service argued that the CHA was "promoting white supremacy under the guise of white pride".

In 2001, the CHA tried to gain exposure by joining the adopt-a-road program to clean debris along highways near Cambridge, Ontario. The Waterloo Region soon expelled the CHA from the program. In 2004, the CHA achieved notoriety for distributing flyers in Fredericton, New Brunswick, on Canada Day. One pamphlet complained about Canadian immigration policy and another featured a picture of a white woman, with the title "Love Your Race". The group has adopted the 2004 New Orleans Protocol for promoting White nationalism.

== See also ==
- List of white nationalist organizations
