= Alliance Française de Toronto =

Cultural and language institute in Toronto, Ontario

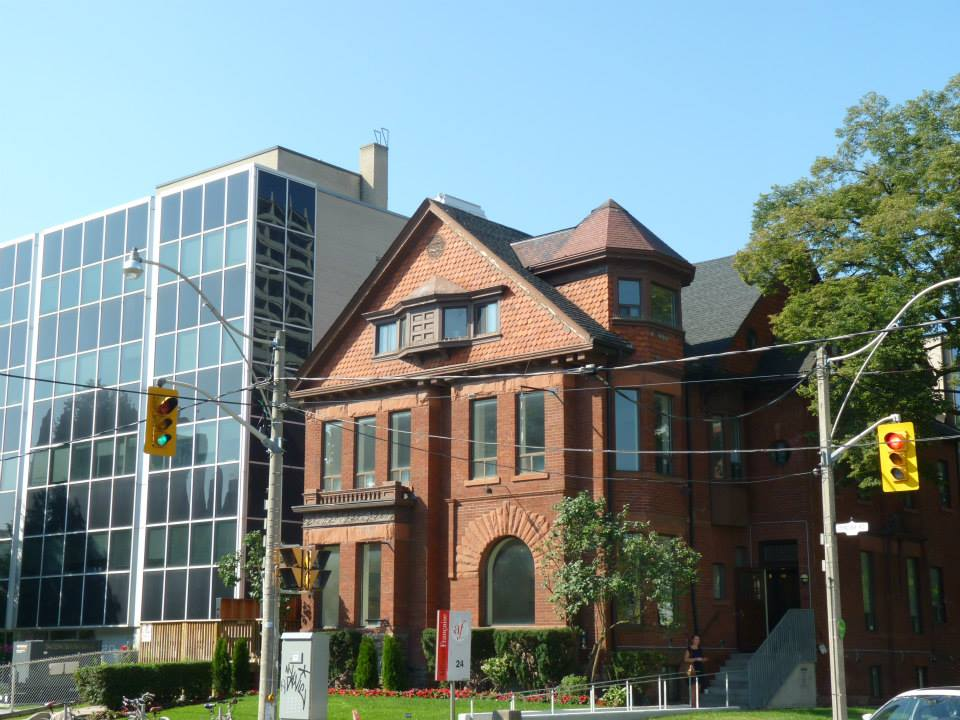
- Founded: October 28, 1902 Alliance Française of Toronto foundation. 1986 Spadina Campus opening
- Founder: Charles Saint-Elme de Champ
- Type: French cultural and language center
- Location: 24 Spadina Road, M5R 2S7 Toronto, Canada
- Coordinates: 43.6687753°N 79.4051929°W
- Region served: Greater Toronto Area (GTA)
- Product: French cultural and language education
- Co-Presidents: Jessica Watkins & Sabine Soumare
- Executive director: Raphaëlle Delaunay
- Parent organization: Fondation Alliance Française
- Website: http://www.alliance-francaise.ca/en

Alliance Française Toronto is a cultural and language institute, part of the Alliance Française network. It consists of five centres across the Greater Toronto Area (GTA), located at Toronto Downtown (Spadina), Mississauga, North York, Oakville and Markham. The Spadina centre houses the cultural centre and a 147-seat theatre.

Founded in Paris in 1883 by Louis Pasteur, Ferdinand de Lesseps and Jules Verne, Alliance Française has always embodied the modern values of humanism, respect of linguistics and cultural diversity. Established in Toronto in 1902, Alliance Française Toronto (AFT) is a 100% Canadian non-profit and charity organization. Alliance Française Toronto has grown to become the largest French language school in Canada, the first Alliance in North America and the sixth worldwide with more than 6,500 students enrolling each year on the five campuses.

== History ==
Alliance Française Toronto was founded on October 28, 1902 by Charles Saint-Elme de Champ and his faculty colleagues to help students learn French. The institution was located on the Victoria Campus of University of Toronto and remained there until the end of the 1950s. During the First World War, the centre offered French courses to Canadian military officers who were about to be shipped away to the French front. Between 1960 and 1970, courses were offered in the basement of one of its teacher's home. Alliance française moved to new premises in 1970 at 60, Charles St West, at the crossing of Bay Street and Charles St.

Since then, Alliance française Toronto has considerably expanded its courses and cultural offerings, especially after the arrival of the director André Petit in 1977 and the election of Bill Graham as a president in 1978.

In 1980, Alliance française Toronto settled in Yonge Street. The space consists of eight classrooms over four floors and a gallery space for exhibits. In 1986, the institution moved to a new building with a typically Victorian character at 24 Spadina Road in the Annex. From the 1990s onwards, Alliance française Toronto has opened new schools in the Greater Toronto Area (GTA). The first one was opened in Mississauga, a few miles away from Toronto in 1991. In September of the same year, a new branch was opened in North York at 1, Elmhurst Ave. The centre moved to bigger premises at 95 Sheppard Ave West in 2004. A new branch opened in Markham in 2010. In 2014, the Spadina Centre renovated its premises and built up a 147-seat auditorium. Nowadays, Alliance française Toronto proposes about 114 cultural events each year including concerts, theatre plays, lectures, movie screenings, dance shows and provides the opportunity to discover the French art de vivre with regular wine and cheese parties.

== Education ==
Alliance française Toronto offers a wide variety of French courses for adults and children of all ages and levels. Different classes are specifically designed to help adult learn French language through General French courses, Conversation courses but also Specialized courses for those who would like to improve their pronunciation or practise their French by participating in Philosophy Club, Book Club … Furthermore, from 8 months to 17 years old, Alliance française Toronto offers a variety of after-school courses and week-end classes as well as March break and Summer camps which give children an experience in a French-speaking environment through fun-filled activities.

== Cultural activities and events ==
- Movie Thursday: Screening of a French-speaking movie on Thursdays at Spadina Theatre.
- Concerts at Spadina Theatre.
- Exhibitions: an exhibition every month by French or French-speaking artists.
- Events for young audiences: a show for children once a month at Spadina Theatre.
- Lectures: Lectures in French or in English.

Alliance Française Toronto is also part of the Bloor Street Culture Corridor.
