= Tri-City Skins =

White power group in Ontario, Canada

Tri-City Skins was an Ontario-based white power group active from 1997 to 2012 in the Kitchener-Waterloo and Cambridge area. James Scott Richardson was the group's most visible member, and in October 2001, police believed that Tri-City Skins had 25 members in southwestern Ontario. Some members of the Tri-City Skins were alleged to have engaged in a campaign of intimidation, assault, vandalism, and other property crimes. Some members have been arrested and charged with possession of illegal weapons and drug possession for the purpose of trafficking.
