= Aryan Guard =

Neo-Nazi group based in Alberta, Canada

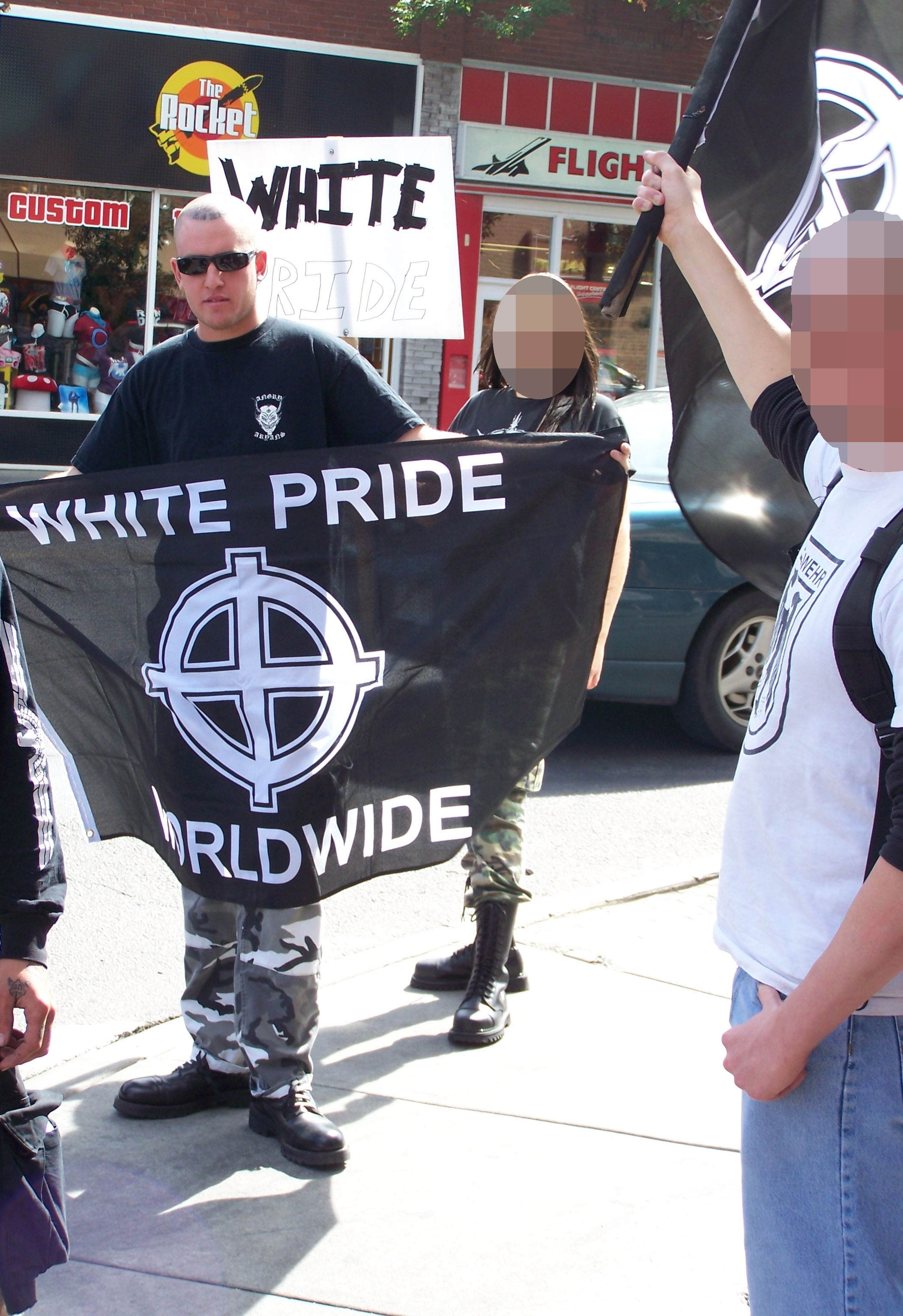
- Aryan Guard protest in Kensington, Calgary (2009)

Properties
- Founded: Late 2006
- Founder: Kyle McKee
- Location: Alberta, Canada
- Members: Unknown, small
- Political ideology: White supremacy; White nationalism; Neo-Nazism; Anti-Islam; Antisemitism
- Political position: Far-right

The Aryan Guard was a neo-Nazi terrorist organization based in Alberta, Canada, whose members were primarily located in the city of Calgary. It was founded in late 2006 and was reported to have disbanded in 2009 due to internal conflicts, including pipe bomb attacks. However, the group denied disbanding late in 2009 and claimed it was still active.

== Origin ==
The Aryan Guard did not gain significant media attention until 2007, when members began a flyering campaign targeting immigrants. Some of these flyers were surreptitiously placed in the free Calgary arts and culture newspaper Fast Forward Weekly by Aryan Guard members. The Friends of the Simon Wiesenthal Center for Holocaust Studies suspect that the individual responsible for the flyers may be Bill Noble, a neo-Nazi well known to law enforcement for his online racist activism, who had previously been charged under Section 319 of the Canadian Criminal Code for "wilful promotion of hatred". The Aryan Guard's website is registered in Noble's name.

At a human rights panel discussion at the Glenbow Museum on August 14, 2007, the topic of the Aryan Guard was discussed by members. Although the flyers were deemed "racially charged", "disturbing", and "outright vile", Inspector Bob Couture of the Calgary Police Service, a speaker on the panel, stated that "there was not enough basis to take action against the group".

== Activities ==
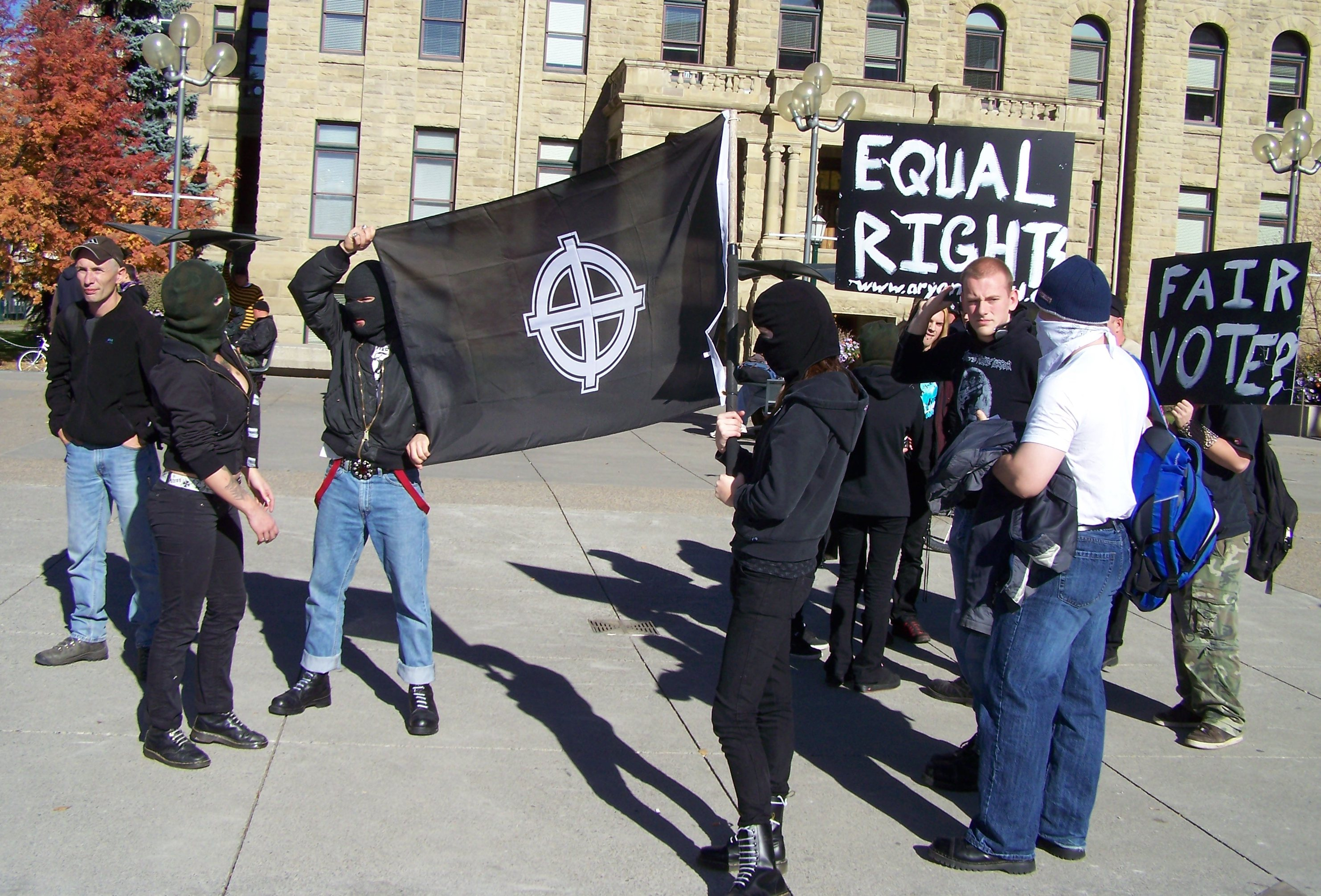
Aryan Guard rally in Calgary in October 2007

In response to the Aryan Guard's activities in the city, Calgary anti-racist activists held a rally supporting Calgary's multiculturalism and opposing racism and racist movements. Some members of the Aryan Guard organized a counter-protest in response to the anti-racist rally. On October 14, 2007, approximately 15 Aryan Guard members protested at Calgary City Hall. They were drastically outnumbered by anti-racism protesters. Police intervened as a safety precaution.

On March 21, 2008—“a date recognized both as a white pride worldwide day and as a celebration for the elimination of racism,”—the Aryan Guard staged a demonstration in downtown Calgary. More than 40 supporters of the Aryan Guard faced a crowd of over 200 anti-racist protesters who prevented the Guard from reaching their planned meeting place at the Mewata Armouries. Police formed a human barrier between the two groups and blocked the movement of the counter-protesters while escorting the Aryan Guard down Stephen Avenue and up the steps of City Hall, where they waved flags proclaiming "White Pride Worldwide". Members of the Aryan Guard also taunted Jason Devine and Bonnie Collins, local anti-racism activists whose home was firebombed on February 12, 2008, while they and their four children were inside. As the demonstration wound down, members of the Aryan Guard were escorted to a waiting school bus by police and evacuated from the scene. An unknown number of anti-racism protesters, who had been under video surveillance during the demonstration, were detained as they left and had their identification recorded by police.

On March 21, 2009, the Aryan Guard held another white pride rally in downtown Calgary, where they confronted anti-racist counter-protestors, resulting in a brawl that brought traffic to a standstill. Several people were treated for injuries. The Aryan Guard received media attention earlier that year on January 10, 2009, when they appeared at a protest against Israel's actions in the Gaza Strip, despite being asked to leave by the protest organizers.

== Criminal convictions and other legal troubles ==
According to Const. Lynn MacDonald, the hate crimes coordinator for the Calgary Police Service, the Aryan Guard is considered a "criminal activity group".

On August 28, 2008, four members of the Aryan Guard were arrested for vandalism that occurred on the Siksika First Nations Reserve near the community of Gleichen, Alberta. On July 27, 2008, a 17-year-old member of the Aryan Guard assaulted a Japanese woman leaving a Calgary bar. The Aryan Guard member was convicted of the assault on March 13, 2009; he was released in April 2009, having been in jail since October 2008.

On the morning of November 21, 2009, two homemade bombs were left on the doorstep of WEB (Western European Bloodline) member Tyler Sturrup. The devices were found and removed to a nearby parking lot moments before detonating.

Hours after Aryan Guard member John Marleau was questioned by police in connection to the bombing—due to information provided by John Marleau's ex-girlfriend—warrants for attempted murder and other charges were issued for Aryan Guard founder Kyle McKee and a 17-year-old accomplice who cannot be named under provisions of Canada's Youth Criminal Justice Act. The accomplice was later found not guilty and released after serving seven months in jail. Following the bomb attempt, the Aryan Guard's website indicated that the group had disbanded.
