= Native Canadian Centre of Toronto =

Indigenous charity organization in Toronto

The Native Canadian Centre of Toronto, founded in 1962, is a membership based charity organization that provides social, recreational, cultural, and spiritual services to Indigenous people in Toronto.

== History ==
In the post-World War II era, Verna Patronella Johnston was a local activist in Toronto and a crucial figure in the development of the NCCT who created a home for the Indigenous community in Toronto on the Danforth. The Jamieson family, from the Six Nations of the Grand River Reserve, also offered their home as a local meeting place for the Indigenous community.

Partnering with the YMCA, the North American Indian Club was formed in 1962. First located at the YMCA at Yonge and College street, the club moved several times in the 1950s and the early 1960s, before landing at 603 Church Street in January 1963 By that time, the club incorporated as the Canadian Indian Centre of Toronto on 4 April 1962.

In 1963 approximately 6,000 people dropped by the centre which grew to 10,000 people the following year and more than doubled with 16,000 visitors by 1964-1965.

Thanks to the Ladies Auxiliary, formed in 1963, the organization was sustaining itself and the centre purchased a three-story home at 210 Beverley Street, previously an Army, Navy, and Air Force Club, and relocated to it in 1966. After joining United Way in March 1966, the Centre became a registered charity in 1967. During this time, the Centre was an incubator for many resources such as Anishnawbe Health, Aboriginal Legal Services of Toronto, Native Child and Family Services, Wigwamen Housing Corporation and more.

In February 1972, the Centre was officially renamed the Native Canadian Centre of Toronto. With a growing community that now reached 25,000 people, the Centre conducted a three-year search for new facilities. By 1975, the Centre moved to its current location at 16 Spadina Road, the former Toronto Bible College, and celebrated its opening officially in 1977, with a ribbon-cutting ceremony led by Ontario Premier Bill Davis.

In 2020 the Ukrainian Museum of Canada, Toronto jointly curated an exhibition on beadwork with the centre.

== Programs ==
- Cultural awareness training
- Seniors program
- Cultural programming including drumming and dancing socials, ceremonies, kids activities, and language classes
- Dodem Kanonsha' Elder's Cultural Facility, a learning and sharing facility fostering understanding between First Nations and Non-Aboriginal People
- Adult case management
- Okichitaw Indigenous martial arts program
- Indigenous marketplace
- Cedar basket gift shop

== See also ==
- Bloor Street Culture Corridor
- Native Friendship Centre
