= Canadian Association for Free Expression =

Neo-Nazi group promoting white supremacist views

The Canadian Association for Free Expression (CAFE) is one of a number of groups run by neo-Nazi and white supremacist Paul Fromm. Established in 1981, CAFE states that it is committed to the promotion and defense of total freedom of speech, and publishes the Free Speech Monitor ten times a year. Although it began in Ontario, it has also been incorporated in Alberta.

Opponents have accused CAFE of racism, arguing that it does not merely support the free speech rights of far right groups, but also promotes their views.

CAFE has criticized what it considers injustices against white people in Canada, and has argued that Canadian laws do not robustly defend the free speech of whites, and are too weighted in favour of minorities. CAFE has campaigned (along with the defunct white nationalist groups Canadian Heritage Alliance and Northern Alliance) for the release of Brad Love, who it claimed was jailed for expressing his nativist sentiments. CAFE has also campaigned for the release of Holocaust deniers Ernst Zündel and David Irving, and against human rights lawyer Richard Warman and the Canadian Human Rights Commission.

On November 23, 2007, Ontario Superior Court Justice Monique Métivier ruled that Fromm and CAFE had libelled Warman, and ordered them to pay $30,000 in damages and to post full retractions within ten days on all the websites on which the defamatory comments were posted. The Ontario Court of Appeal upheld the judgment in December 2008 with damages being raised to $40,000, as Fromm was ordered to pay an additional $10,000 towards Warman's legal costs. Warman said the appeal court's ruling "sends the message that those who try to use the cloak of free speech to poison other people's reputations through lies and defamation do so at their own peril."

CAFE was an intervenor in Oger v Whatcott, a hearing before the British Columbia Human Rights Tribunal regarding harassment of Ms. Oger by Mr. Whatcott, who Ms. Oger alleged ran a very public campaign of harassment against her on the basis of her gender identity. CAFE supported Mr. Whatcott's right to make those statements, and adopted many of Mr. Whatcott's statements in its submissions to the Tribunal. On March 27, 2019, the Tribunal ruled that CAFE's behaviour as an intervenor was "improper", and that its submissions were "inflammatory, derogatory, disrespectful and inappropriate".

== See also ==
- Citizens for Foreign Aid Reform
- Heritage Front
- List of white nationalist organizations
