= Citizens for Foreign Aid Reform =

Canadian far-right group

Citizens for Foreign Aid Reform (C-FAR) is one of a number of groups run by neo-Nazi and white supremacist Paul Fromm. It was founded in 1976 by Fromm after he had left the white supremacist Western Guard organization. C-FAR became closely linked to Canadian Association for Free Expression (CAFE), another one of Fromm's groups, which he founded in 1981. The main issue on C-FAR's agenda has been the promotion of an ultra-right wing agenda that is opposed to foreign aid and immigration.

In 1987, the Toronto Star newspaper described C-FAR as part of a "spider web" of ultra-right wing activists. Apart from foreign aid and immigration, C-FAR's publications also support white supremacy, gun rights, and environmentalism.

It appears that the activities of C-FAR have decreased after Fromm was fired from his position with the Peel Board of Education as a result of his involvement in racist activities.
