= Martin K. Weiche =

Canadian politician

President of the Canadian Nazi Party
- In office 1968?–1978
- Preceded by: Unknown
- Succeeded by: Party dissolved*

De facto Leader of the "National Socialist" Party (unregistered)
- In office June 24, 1968 – June 26, 1968
- Preceded by: Party created*
- Succeeded by: Party dissolved*

President of the Canadian National Socialist Party (Unregistered)
- In office 1980–?
- Preceded by: Unknown
- Succeeded by: Unknown

Personal details
- Born: January 6, 1921 Lebus, Germany
- Died: September 2, 2011 (aged 90) Canada

Martin K. Weiche (January 6, 1921 – September 2, 2011) was a neo-Nazi political figure in Canada.

== Background ==
Born in Lebus, Germany, January 6, 1921. Weiche was a self-confessed Nazi, but he never belonged to the Hitler Youth or the Nazi Party. As a teenager, Weiche joined the NSKK (National Socialist Motor Corps). Weiche fought for Nazi Germany as a pilot and soldier during World War II. He was later held as a prisoner of war at a Canadian-run internment camp in the Netherlands.

Weiche entered Canada on November 13, 1951, at Halifax, arriving on the steamship SS Homeland.

Coming to Canada after the war, he earned a living from the 1950s onwards by buying houses cheaply, renovating them and then selling them at a profit.

In 1957, Weiche started building apartment buildings in the cities of London and Sarnia. In London, he built a total of thirteen buildings, from a nine unit with a large penthouse suite to the complex known as "Skyview" with 234 units. In Sarnia, in 1965, Weiche built "Huron View Towers" with 74 units and a large penthouse suite, which was the largest apartment building in Sarnia at the time.

Weiche quit his building activities in 1980 and retired to his residence, known as "The Berghof", in Hyde Park, Ontario.

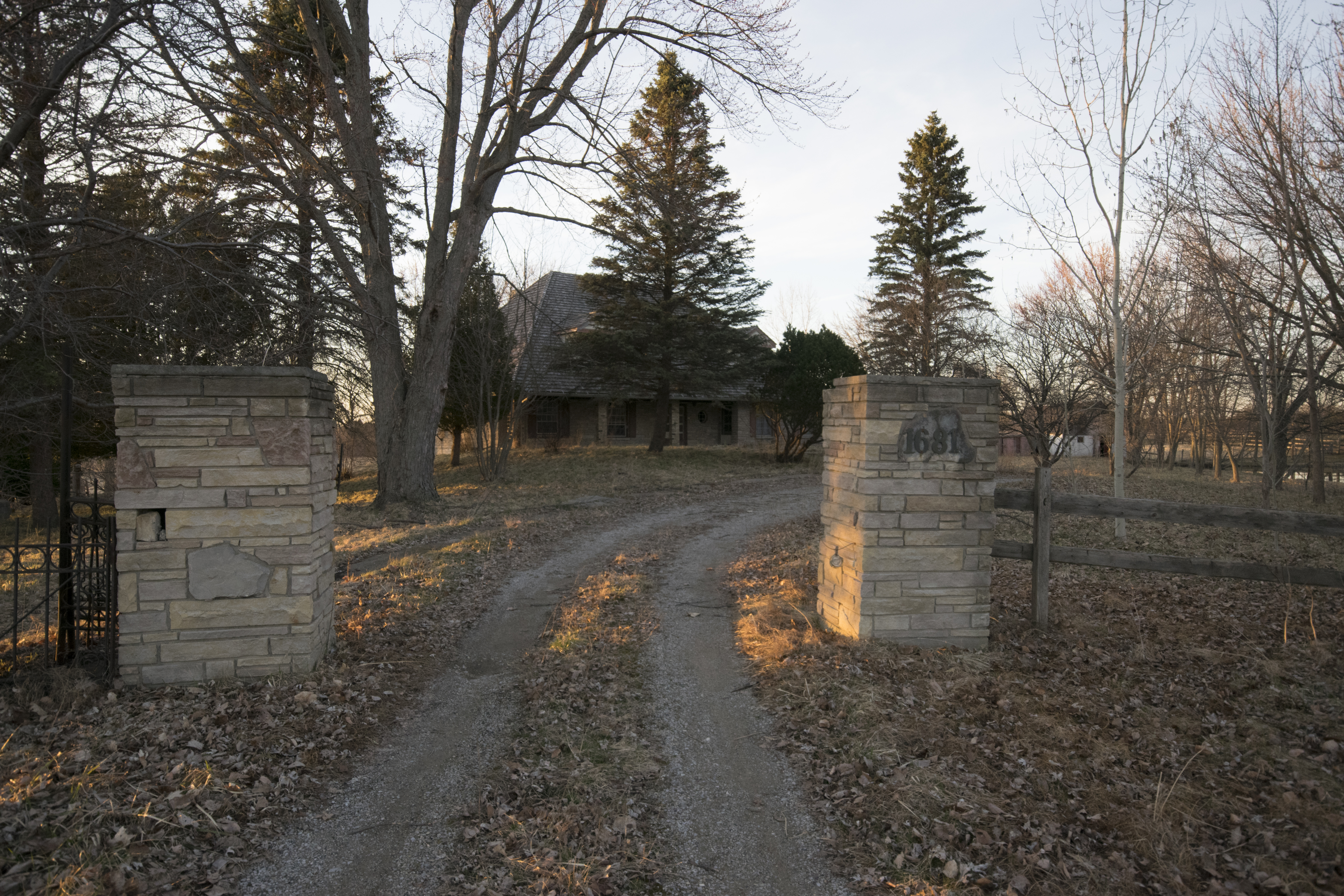
Martin Weiche's former home. Third Reich eagles used to be on the pillars shown.

== Political activity ==
In the 1968 federal election in Canada, Weiche ran for election to the House of Commons of Canada as a "National Socialist" candidate in the Ontario riding of London East. Weiche won only 89 votes, 0.3% of the total cast in the riding.

He was identified as a leading figure in the "Canadian Nazi Party" which was led by William John Beattie of Sarnia until 1978 and was later identified as president of the "Canadian National Socialist Party", which was likely the same organization. This party was inspired by the Nazi ideology.

In 1971, he and Beattie disrupted the Social Credit Party of Canada national convention when they refused to leave. Their memberships in the party had been revoked by the party's executive council because their presence was "inimical to the interests of the party". Yelling that the party would have to "bring in storm troopers" to get them out, they disrupted the party's public affairs workshop, and the whole convention. They were allowed to stay as non-voting observers.

Weiche also ran as an independent candidate endorsed by the breakaway Social Credit Association of Ontario and the Western Guard in Trinity riding in the 1974 federal election. He won 64 votes, 0.3% of the total.

Until the 1970s, candidates were free to identify their political affiliation as they saw fit. As of the 1972 election, however, candidates who were not nominated by officially registered political parties could only identify themselves as "Independent" or "no party".

In 1980, Weiche was identified in the media as president of the Canadian National Socialist Party (an unregistered political party) when, in Sarnia, Weiche was invited to appear on radio station CHOK. The appearance was cancelled due to public complaints. Despite the cancellation, a clash broke out between followers of Weiche and members of the Conference Against Racist and Fascist Violence during a protest outside the station.

Later that year, a Ku Klux Klan cross burning and rally led by Alexander McQuirter was held on Weiche's 12-acre (49,000 m^{2}) farm in southwestern Ontario. McQuirter described Weiche as "nothing more than a friend (who) doesn't necessarily agree with our principles."

A subsequent cross burning on his property in 1993 attended by approximately 40 people dressed in Klan regalia led the provincial government of Bob Rae to consider amending the Ontario Human Rights Code to ban the activity.

== Operation Red Dog ==
In 1981, Weiche was named as one of the financial backers of Operation Red Dog, a failed white supremacist plot to overthrow the government of Dominica. Don Andrews described Weiche as "a National Socialist, or Nazi [with] money and vast real estate holdings" who was interested in Dominica for business reasons. Weiche admitted he had been approached by ringleader Michale Purdue to invest in the scheme but denied any involvement saying "I wasn't interested in his revolution... Perdue is a liar about everything. Perdue is an infiltrator who had to stick it to some people." However, Weiche told a reporter that he would like to see a population transfer where Blacks from the Caribbean are relocated to Canada and whites repopulate the islands and set up an ideal society on white supremacist principles. Though he denied contributing anything financially to the plot, he admitted in an interview that he was "involved with the idea of Dominica since the middle of '79," wanting to create a colony for "all pure whites - Aryan stock, physically as well as mentally."

== Later activities ==
In the 1990s, Weiche worked with the Nationalist Party of Canada's Don Andrews in an attempt to have municipalities recognize "European Heritage Week" following up from a successful 1995 attempt to have London, Ontario recognize "European Heritage Day". Weiche filed a complaint with the Canadian Human Rights Commission when the city rejected Weiche's proposal.

Weiche made his fortune as a developer and, in 2000, was reported by Now Magazine to be a major financial backer of far-right leader Paul Fromm.

His property near London, Ontario, included a room designed to approximate Adolf Hitler's Alpine retreat. The room reportedly included "oil paintings and photographs of Hitler hang[ing] on walls inside, [along with] two faded swastika pennants. An autographed copy of Hitler's Mein Kampf sits on a study bookshelf. And there are photographs of former U.S. Nazi leader George Lincoln Rockwell and the Queen," according to a 1981 Globe and Mail report.

His son, David Weiche, was a member of the Bandidos biker gang and was described as the "right-hand man" of Wayne Kellestine, the leading perpetrator of the Shedden massacre in which eight fellow members of the Bandidos were murdered. David Weiche moved to Winnipeg three months before the massacre. When the murders came to light, Martin Weiche told the London Free Press, "If I was David... I'd go and hide, I would quickly disappear for a few weeks. The murderers are still out there."

A large backward swastika cut into a field behind Weiche’s home drew international attention to London with the launch of Google Earth.

Weiche died of kidney failure on September 2, 2011, at the age of 90.

== See also ==
- List of political parties in Canada
