= Neo-Nazism in Canada =

National occurrence of Neo-Nazism

Flag of Canadian neo-Nazi organization White Boy Posse. The group uses the Reichskriegsflagge of Nazi Germany.

Neo-Nazism (French: le Néonazisme) is the post World War II ideology that promotes white supremacy and specifically antisemitism. As the name suggests, neo-Nazis regularly invoke the ideology, symbolism and iconography of Germany's Third Reich. In Canada, neo-Nazism has existed as a branch of the far-right and has been a source of considerable controversy for over 50 years.

== History ==
Neo-Nazism in Canada has its roots in the rise of white supremacist organizations such as the Ku Klux Klan which had expanded into Canada (specifically the Prairies) by the 1920s. However, after Adolf Hitler took power in Germany in 1933, Adrien Arcand’s National Social Christian Party dominated the white supremacist front. Once World War II began, Nazism became anathema, and far-right white supremacist movements faded into the background for decades.

Contemporary neo-Nazism in Canada began with the formation of the Canadian Nazi Party in 1965. In the 1970s and 1980s, neo-Nazism continued to spread as organizations including the Western Guard Party and Church of the Creator promoted white supremacist ideals. Neo-Nazism in Canada was revitalized in 1989 with the institution of the Heritage Front organization and the rise in popularity of skinhead music. However, controversy and dissention has left many Canadian neo-Nazi organizations dissolved or weakened in the last few years.

== Influential leaders ==
=== Adrien Arcand ===
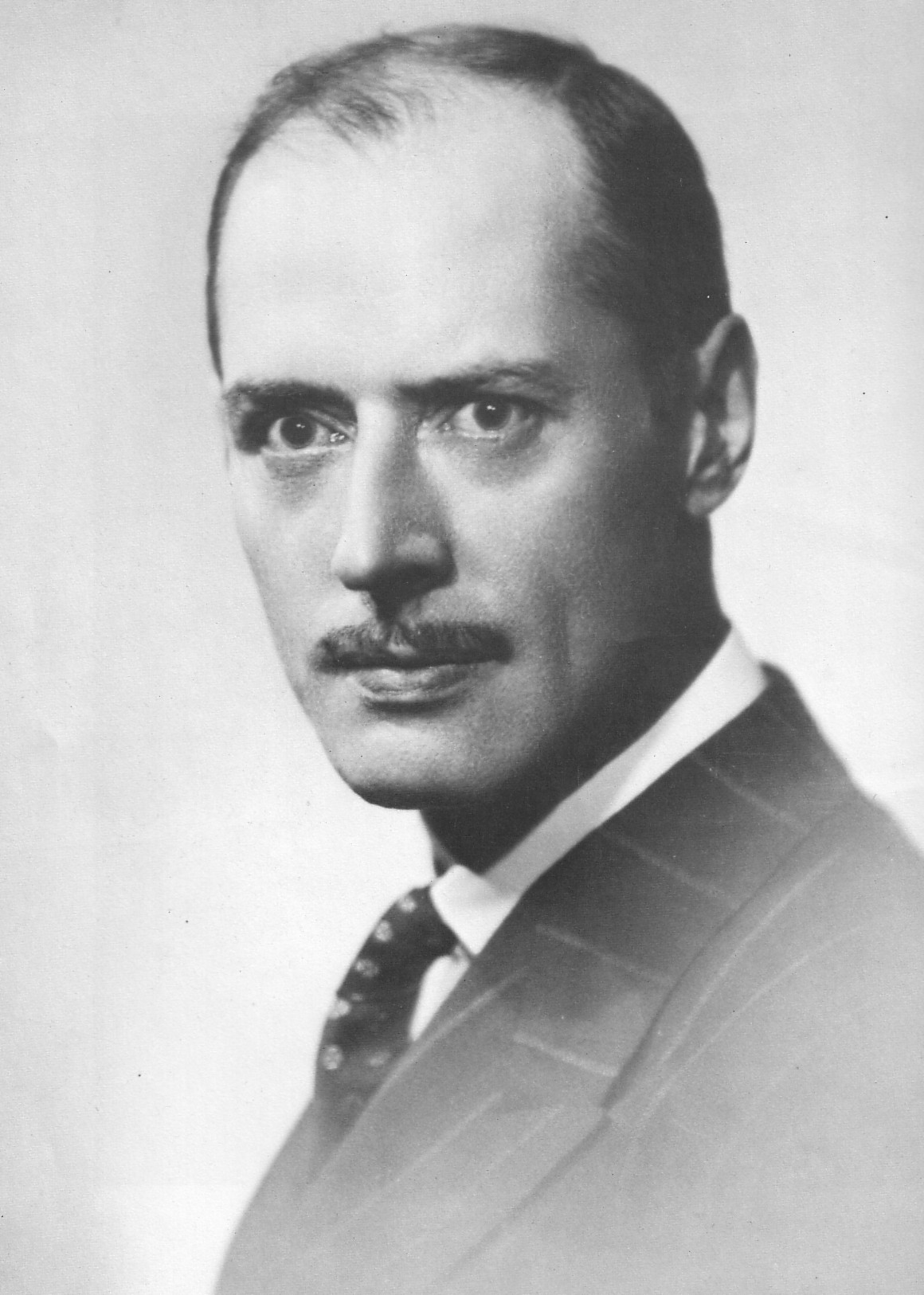
Adrien Arcand in 1933

Adrien Arcand (October 3, 1899 – August 1, 1967) was a journalist from Montreal and one of the earliest and most influential Fascist leaders in Canada. He was the editor for several Canadian antisemitic newspapers. In 1934, he created the Parti national social chrétien, in English the National Social Christian Party. In 1938 his party merged with the Prairie provinces' Canadian Nationalist Party and Ontario’s Nationalist Party. Arcand was chosen to be the leader of this new National Unity Party of Canada, however, this right wing fascist party was banned during World War II under the Defence of Canada Regulations. Arcand was arrested in 1940 and placed in an internment camp for the duration of the war. After the fall of Nazi Germany, Arcand lost popularity and influence, but continued promoting anti-communism and antisemitism and still referred to himself as the "Canadian Führer" until he died.

=== John Beattie ===
John Beattie (born 1941) formed the Canadian Nazi Party in 1965. In 1966, George Lincoln Rockwell, the American Nazi Party founder, said that Beattie was “leading a tremendous and successful movement.” In 1967 the party was renamed the Nationalist Socialist Party (paralleling the American party's change of name in the same year from the American Nazi Party to the National Socialist White People's Party). Beattie led the party 13 years until it was disbanded. After the Canadian Nazi Party was dissolved, John Beattie tried to start several other neo-Nazi organizations, but never had any real success. He also was a witness for the defence in the Ernst Zündel trials of the early twenty-first century, and continued to promote white supremacy, but has faded to the background of the neo-Nazi scene.

=== Don Andrews ===
Don Andrews (born 1942 as Vilim Zlomislic) is an ethnic Croat who was born during World War II in what is now Serbia. His father was a member of the Yugoslav Partisans and was killed fighting Nazis in occupied Yugoslavia, and his mother was taken to Germany where after the war she met and married a Canadian and moved to Toronto. She eventually found her son via the Red Cross and in 1952 Zlomislic was brought to Canada and renamed Donald Andrews. Andrews cofounded a far right organization known as the Edmund Burke Society in 1967. Andrews became the main leader of the group and transformed it into the overtly racist Western Guard Party in 1972. However, in 1975 Andrews was ordered by the courts to not participate in the Western Guard after being convicted of conspiring to bomb an Israeli soccer team. As a result, Andrews created the Nationalist Party of Canada. Besides leading the Nationalist Party, Don Andrews has been associated with other neo-Nazis and far-right activities all over Canada. One of the most well-known incidents involving Andrews was the plot to take over the island of Dominica in 1979. Andrews initially supported Mike Purdue and Wolfgang Droege’s plan to overthrow the government of Dominica in 1979. He later withdrew his active support but still gave contact information of people who could help. As leader of the Nationalist Party, Andrews has run for public office numerous times including the election for the Mayor of Toronto in 2010.

=== Wolfgang Droege ===
Wolfgang Droege (September 25, 1949 – April 13, 2005) was a Canadian neo-Nazi leader. Born in Germany, he was raised by parents and grandparents who had been supporters of the Nazi Party. In the early 1970s, Droege moved to Canada. He quickly became affiliated with far-right politics and joined the Western Guard Party in the early 1970s, but left to join the Nationalist Party of Canada in 1975 and the Ku Klux Klan in 1976. In 1981, Droege was arrested for plotting to overthrow the government of the Caribbean island of Dominica. He and nine others planned to help Patrick John, the previous prime minister, reassume power in return for permission to use the island as a base for drug trafficking and white supremacy. After spending three years in prison, Droege continued promoting neo-Nazism and trafficking drugs. In 1985, he was sentenced to a thirteen-year jail term in Alabama for possession of cocaine and weapons, but served only four years before returning to Canada in April 1989. Tired of the Nationalist Party and their lack of expansion, Droege decided to form his own neo-Nazi organization, and later that year he established the Heritage Front. However, with the development of the internet and emergence of the information era, Droege's involvement in Heritage Front diminished as he shifted his focus to illicit drug traffic. On April 13, 2005, Droege was found dead in his apartment. Although it was originally presumed that his murder was caused by his involvement in a love triangle, it is now accepted that his murderer was a delusional paranoid drug user who turned on him.

=== George Burdi ===
George Burdi was born in 1970 in Toronto. He was raised by Christian parents, but began to develop racist tendencies at age 18 to gain approval from his girlfriend's father. Although his parents disapproved, Burdi continued to study neo-Nazi literature and in his first year at college met Ernst Zündel, the man who introduced him to the World Church of the Creator. In 1989, Burdi started the band RaHoWa and performed in occasional shows that usually ended in riots. In 1993, George Burdi established Resistance Records, the number one distributor of skinhead music. For a time, Burdi led the Toronto Branch of the Church of the Creator and continued performing and selling skinhead music. In 1995, he was convicted of assault and sentenced to a year in prison. After a month, he was released only for his conviction to be upheld again in 1997.

During his jail time, Burdi decided that he didn't want to have anything to do with white supremacy and after he was released from his year-long prison sentence, Burdi's involvement in the neo-Nazi movement ended and he separated himself from his old life and renounced racism. In an interview with Intelligence Report, Burdi stated that, “Racism is wrong because ... I should probably say hatred is wrong, anger is wrong. Hatred and anger are wrong because they consume what is good in you. They smother your ability to appreciate love and peace.” Burdi subsequently performed in a multicultural band, while his earlier recordings continue to be used as an expression of the neo-Nazi movement in Canada. In the late 2010s, Burdi returned to performing with RaHoWa; Appalachian State University political science professor Nancy S. Love, author of Trendy Fascism, remarked, during a 2018 interview with The Financial Times, that Burdi had been "silent for almost 20 years but in 2017 resurfaced, emboldened by the Trump presidency and also the turn to the right in Europe”.

=== Ernst Zündel ===
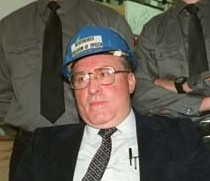
Ernst Zündel in 1992

Ernst Zündel (April 24, 1939 – August 5, 2017) was born in Germany in 1939. At age 19, he moved to Canada where he worked as a photographer and artist. He quickly became Canada's leading “Holocaust-denial propagandist.” In the late 1970s he started using Samisdat Publishers to produce and distribute Nazi and neo-Nazi propaganda world-wide. Court cases followed and Zündel was sentenced to serve 15 months of jail time for publishing lies about the Holocaust, under a provision of the Criminal Code that banned the spreading of false information with intent to harm. The publicity made Zündel an even more influential figure among neo-Nazi organizations and he used his newfound influence to help further white supremacist movements. Zündel applied for Canadian citizenship twice. During his second attempt in 1994, a long series of hearings and court cases followed, but he was never issued Canadian citizenship. In 2001 Zündel moved to the United States, but was deported back to Canada for Visa violations in 2003. He was deported to Germany in 2005 where he was taken into custody and arrested for inciting racial hatred. After his release from prison on March 1, 2010, Zündel was believed to be living with relatives in Bad Wildbad, Germany. He died in Germany in 2017.

== Organizations ==
=== New Constitution Party of Canada ===
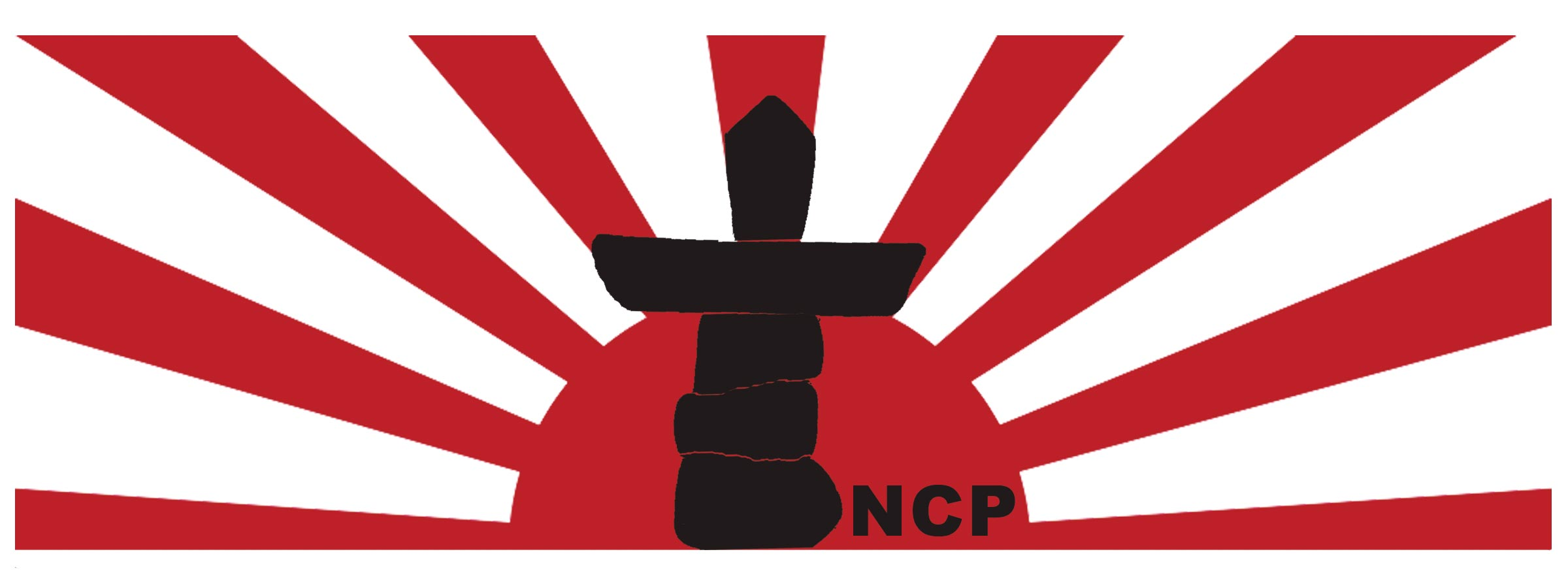
Logo of the New Constitution Party

The New Constitution Party is a white supremacist associated, anti-Semitic, and self-described "anti-Marxist" group based in Toronto, led by James Sears. It is not registered by Elections Canada as a political party in Canada, and focused its activities on spreading hate speech through its 'National Socialist' themed newsletter and website Your Ward News and YouTube videos posted by Sears. The New Constitution Party has close ties to members or former members of the defunct white supremacist group the Heritage Front such as Gary Schipper.

=== Nationalist Party of Canada ===
The Nationalist Party of Canada is an unregistered political party established in 1977 by Don Andrews. The party describes itself as white nationalist and "race realist", and is known for its antisemitic and racist publications. Many influential neo-Nazi Leaders such as Wolfgang Droege affiliated with the party, but after the formation of the Heritage Front in 1989, the majority of its radicals left to join the new and promising Heritage Front.

=== Heritage Front ===
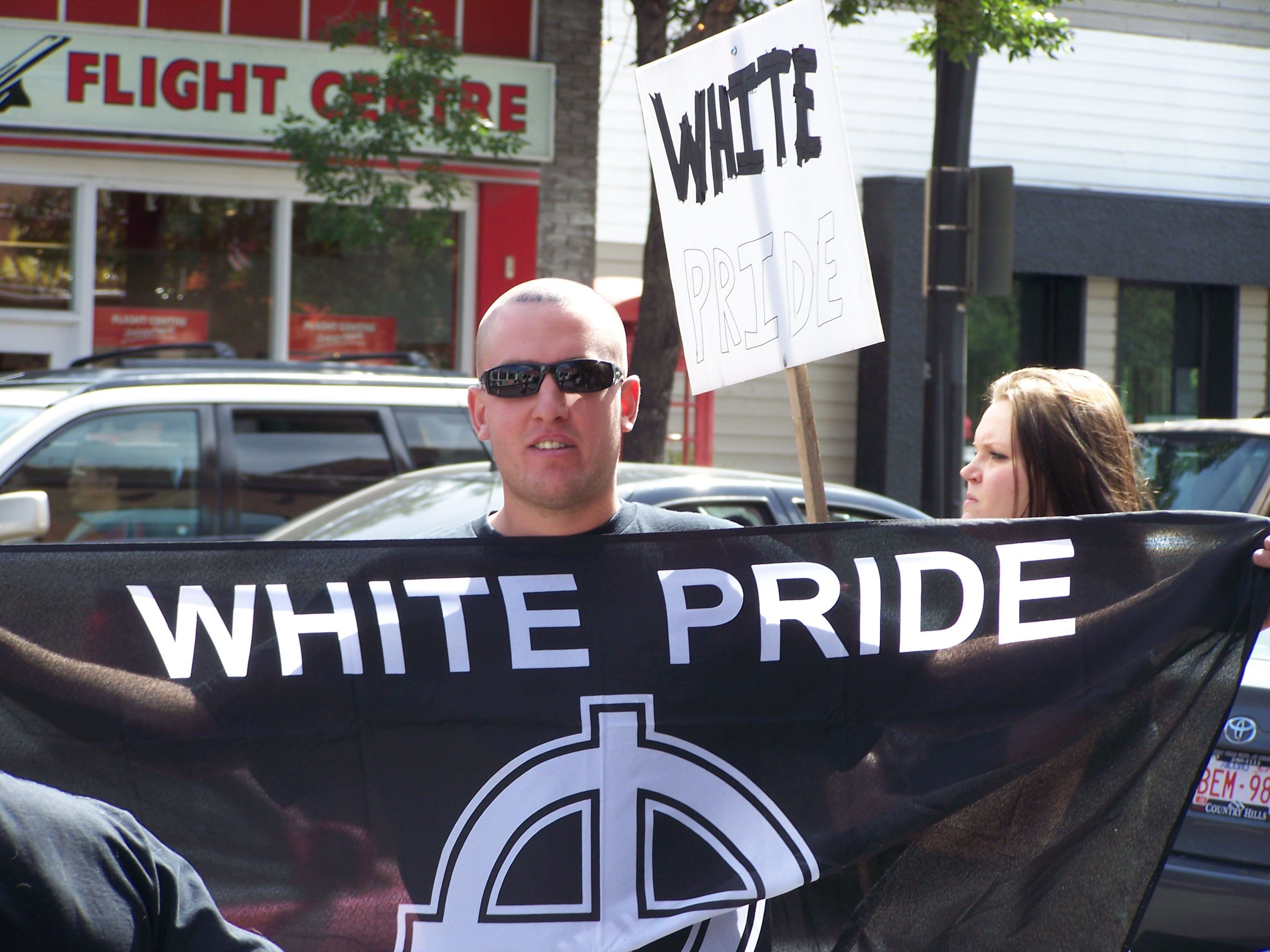
Members of the Alberta-based neo-Nazi group Aryan Guard stage a counter-protest, at an anti-racism rally. They are seen here on the Southwest corner of Kensington Road and 10 Street Northwest in Calgary, Alberta, Canada

Heritage Front was a neo-Nazi organization created by Wolfgang Droege in 1989 in Toronto. Leaders of the white supremacist movement were “disgruntled about the state of the radical right” and wanted to unite and intensify the unorganized groups of white supremacists into an influential and efficient group with common objectives. Plans for the organization began in September 1989 and Heritage Front was formally announced a couple of months later in November.

At first Heritage Front leaders planned to increase its influence and attract following by “soft peddling its racism to garner more support,” but a video released showed a militaristic and radical organization that isolated moderates. Heritage Front also attempted to infiltrate and take control of the Reform Party of Canada. The plot was discovered and made known to the public by the press in 1992 and Heritage Front members were expelled from the party.

Based on the white supremacist idea of “awakening people to the reality of race”, Heritage Front members believe themselves to be revolutionaries with the duty of creating a new and racially pure society. Heritage Front is primarily an activist organization that organizes white supremacist activities. The following quote from the journal Patterns of Prejudice describes how Heritage Front functions: “[Heritage Front] broadcasts oppressive messages on its hate lines. It physically fights with anti-racists on the streets. It harasses people of colour. It celebrates Aryan fests along with other racists. And, in addition, it has a presence at international conferences, creates and disseminates racist posters and flyers, mounts White Power concerts, recruits in the schoolyards, brings in speakers like Tom Metzger, meets with white-supremacist and nationalist leaders throughout the world, networks with other groups on the radical right, publishes a magazine, and posts articles and messages on its website.” One of the key goals of Heritage Front is to unite far right organizations and people. As such, it keeps close ties with other white supremacist groups such as Aryan Nations, the Church of the Creator, and the Ku Klux Klan.

During the early 1990s, Heritage Front grew in power, but with the scandal with the Reform Party and a diminished period of activities and publications, the Front went through a period of regrouping and reorganization. In the fall of 2000 under new leadership of Marc Lemire, Heritage Front once again came to the fore of white supremacy in Canada with a vigorous advertising campaign. However, the new radical approach isolated many people and by 2005, Heritage Front was defunct and disbanded.

=== Church of the Creator ===
The Church of the Creator or Creativity is a religion established by Ben Klassen in 1973. The church teaches that the Aryan race is the chosen race and calls for Rahowa, or Racial Holy War to be raged against Jews and other races. Although Creativity is a religion, it acts as a political organization and promotes and organizes neo-Nazi and skinhead functions. Nonetheless, Creativity endorses legal and nonviolent demonstrations. In Canada, the Creativity movement was made popular by George Burdi.

== See also ==
- Fascism in Canada
- Neo-Nazism
- White Supremacy
- List of Nazi monuments in Canada
- Neo-Nazism in Russia
