= Al Overfield =

Alan Overfield
- Occupation: Political activist
- Known for: Founding member of the Edmund Burke Society
- Political party: Social Credit Party of Canada; Nationalist Party of Canada; Reform Party of Canada
- Movement: White supremacy

Alan Overfield was born a First Nations person on Manitoulin Island and is considered to have been a Canadian white supremacist.

He was a founding member of the Edmund Burke Society, established by Paul Fromm, Don Andrews, and Leigh Smith. He was also part of an attempted takeover by Fromm of the Ontario wing of the national Social Credit Party of Canada. Overfield appears to have run for office under the banner of the Social Credit Party in the riding of Beaches-Woodbine. Though he was expelled from the national party, he remained a member of the Ontario Social Credit Party, which had been taken over by the Edmund Burke Society in the early 1970s.

In 1973, after the Edmund Burke Society became the Western Guard Party, Overfield claims to have founded the Canadian Liberty League as an alternative to the Western Guard. Overfield later became a member of Don Andrew's Nationalist Party of Canada. It was through his involvement with Andrews that Overfield became acquainted with Wolfgang Droege whom Overfield employed as a part-time bailiff.

== The Reform Party of Canada ==
Overfield claims to have been out of politics for 15 years when he decided to become active again. When he joined the Reform Party of Canada, he claims to have "let the Reform Party executive know about his political past, and they had no problems with it." Overfield stated that Reform Party member Harry Robertson admitted him to the Party and that future Prime Minister of Canada Stephen Harper was well aware of Overfield's past involvement in far right groups. Harper denied such knowledge and stated that he had been "building issues into the Reform Party's platform to actively discourage extremists and 'nut cases'" at the time of Overfield's membership.

One claim for Overfield's involvement in the Reform Party was an attempt to discredit the party for Preston Manning's involvement in placing the Ontario wing of the Social Credit Party under the personal trusteeship of the national leader to counter Paul Fromm's activities. However, it is also on the record that Overfield's confided in Paul Fromm that his plan was "to unify all the right wing people into one cohesive organization. He was pushing to infiltrate ten or twelve Riding Associations in Metro Toronto. Even if they did not win the riding associations in an election, they would at least have control. The attraction of Reform for Overfield and like-minded persons, he said was that it was strictly white bread, 100 percent white Canadians, really anti-immigration; there was really no difference between those people and them (Overfield's group)."

While he was a member of the Reform Party, Overfield claimed to have signed up 22 members, including Heritage Front members Peter Mitrevski, Nicola Polinuk, Droege, Zvominir Lelas and Tony Cinncinato.

== Security for the Reform Party ==
In the early 1990s when the Reform Party was making inroads into Ontario, there were concerns about groups that would try to disrupt Reform meetings. Also, Reform Party leader Preston Manning did not have Royal Canadian Mounted Police security and was instead dependent upon local organizations. On May 27, 1991, Andrew Flint, then the Ontario Regional Coordinator for the Reform Party, was approached by Overfield who offered his bailiff as Reform Party security. Among those who worked as security for the Reform Party were Wolfgang Droege, James Dawson, Peter Mitrevski, other Heritage Front members, and Grant Bristow, who was later discovered to be a Canadian Security Intelligence Service mole. Bristow became Manning's personal bodyguard while Overfield's men were providing security at Reform Party meetings and rallies.

== Expulsion from the Reform Party ==
On February 28, 1992, the Toronto Sun broke the story that the Heritage Front had infiltrated the Reform Party. Droege claimed as many as 150 to 200 Heritage Front members were also members of the Reform Party, including some at the riding executive levels, but only a handful were discovered to be actual Heritage Front members. When Reform Party executives became aware that Heritage Front members had joined the Reform Party, a special committee of the Executive Council began an investigation. The Special Committee revoked the membership in the Reform Party of Droege, Dawson, Polinuk, and Mitrevski. Overfield was expelled from the Reform Party, for showing "poor judgement in the hiring of known neo-Nazis."
