= Gerry Lincoln =

Gerald C. (Gerry) Lincoln (died November 5 or 6, 2017) was one of the founders of the Heritage Front along with Wolfgang Droege, Grant Bristow and James Scott Dawson. Lincoln was editor of Up Front, the group's official magazine, designed the group's logo and also acted as one of its spokespersons.

In 1989, Lincoln traveled with Droege and other members of the Nationalist Party of Canada to Libya on the invitation of Muammar al-Gaddafi to celebrate the twentieth anniversary of the Libyan regime. It was on that trip that several members of the Nationalist Party, disaffected by the leadership of Don Andrews, decided to found the Heritage Front.

In the 1960s, Lincoln was a fan of Jackie Shane, an openly gay, transgender, Black soul and rhythm and blues singer based in Toronto. Lincoln moved from New York to Toronto in 1965 to take a job as manager of the pop department of A&A Records He noticed that customers were coming in to buy Shane's single of "Any Other Way" from the early 60s even though it had dropped off the charts and was no longer in print and the Canadian distributor no longer had the rights. Having become a fan himself, he was able to convince Caravan Records to record Jackie Shane Live at the Saphire Tavern in 1967, for which he wrote the liner notes. The album was reissued in 2015 when interest in Shane revived.

In his later years, Lincoln ceased his political activities and owned an internet cafe in Cabbagetown, Toronto.
