= Droege =

Droege is a surname. Notable people with the surname include:

- Don Droege (born 1955), American soccer player
- Drew Droege (born 1977), American actor, comedian, writer, and director
- Walter Droege (born 1952/1953), German billionaire
- Wolfgang Droege (1949–2005), German-born Canadian neo-Nazi
