= Nazi Party of Canada =

Nazi Party of Canada may refer to:

- National Unity Party (Canada), led by Adrien Arcand
- Nazi Party (Canada), led by William John Beattie
