= William J. Beattie =

William J. Beattie may refer to:

- William John Beattie (born 1941/2), founder of the Canadian Nazi Party
- William J. Beattie, owner of "Park Dandy", winner of the 1955 Canadian International Stakes
