= Schipper =

Schipper is a Dutch occupational surname meaning skipper. People with this surname include:

- David Schipper (b. 1991), American soccer player
- Don Pepijn Schipper (b. 1980), Dutch DJ known as "Don Diablo"
- Esther Schipper, German art dealer
- Gary Schipper (b. 1952), Canadian neo-Nazi
- Geert Schipper (1948–2025), Dutch road cyclist
- Geert Schipper (paratriathlete), Dutch paralympic paratriathlete
- Gerrit Schipper (1775–1832), Dutch portrait painter
- Hendrikje Schipper (1890–2005), oldest Dutch person
- Jakob Schipper (1842–1915), German-Austrian philologist
- Jan Jacobsz. Schipper (1616–1669), Dutch bookseller, printer, and theatre poet
- Jessicah Schipper (b. 1986), Australian swimmer
- Johanna Schipper (1967), Taiwanese-born French comics artist
- Jos Schipper (b. 1951), Dutch road cyclist
- Katherine Schipper, American accounting researcher
- Kristofer Schipper (1934–2021), Dutch sinologist
- Lee Schipper (1947–2011), American physicist and energy efficiency expert
- Leo Schipper (1938–1984), Surinamese football coach and player
- Mineke Schipper (b. 1938), Dutch author and literary theorist
- Ron Schipper (1928–2006), American college football coach
- Sebastian Schipper (b. 1968), German actor and movie director

== In television ==
- Schipper naast Mathilde, a 1950s Flemish TV series.

== See also ==
- Schiffer
- Schippers
