= James Alexander McQuirter =

Grand Wizard of the Canadian Ku Klux Klan

James Alexander McQuirter (born c. 1959 and also known as James Tavian Alexander) is a former Imperial Wizard of the Canadian Knights of the Ku Klux Klan. In 1981, he was charged, along with Wolfgang Droege and other white supremacists, with plotting to overthrow the government of Dominica. McQuirter joined the white supremacist Western Guard as a teenager and first met Droege at the age of 16 in 1975. In 1976, he and Droege attended the "International Patriotic Congress" organized by American Klan leader David Duke and were recruited as Canadian organizers for Duke's Knights of the Ku Klux Klan. In 1978, McQuirter and Armand Siksna were charged with conspiracy to distribute hate literature following a police raid on Siksna's Toronto apartment.

McQuirter and Droege subsequently moved to Vancouver to join McQuirter's father in the used car business as well as organize for the Klan. In 1978, McQuirter returned to Toronto and joined the Nationalist Party of Canada's executive council but, in 1979, he allowed his membership in the party to lapse due to disdain for leader Don Andrews and resumed his activity with the Klan full-time. At its peak, the Canadian chapter of the Klan was estimated by researcher Stanley R. Barrett to have approximately 2,500 members coming from every province of Canada. Police stated the actual number to be closer to 70 - not 2500.

In 1981, McQuirter was arrested and sentenced to two years in prison for his role in Operation Red Dog, the plot to overthrow the government of Dominica and install a white supremacist haven initiated with an American mercenary and Klan sympathizer who came into contact with Droege in 1979. The Dominican government learned of the plot in 1981 and arrested Patrick John, the Dominican who was to be the coup d'état's figurehead. The FBI arrested Droege in New Orleans.

A book about the plot, by Canadian journalist Stewart Bell, was published in August 2008.

With the KKK falling into disarray, McQuirter quit in the summer of 1982 with the intention of founding a more moderate organization. In August 1982, McQuirter was charged with conspiracy to murder another Klansman, Gary MacFarlane, because of his abuse of his partner and the perception that he was a security risk to the Klan. McQuirter pleaded guilty. He was sentenced in 1983 and served a prison term until 1989 when he was released to a Toronto half-way house.

McQuirter kept a low profile after leaving prison. Wolfgang Droege contacted him in 1991 about becoming active in the Heritage Front but, according to Droege "he was not politically active and had no desire to get involved in racist politics".

Using the pseudonym James Tavian Alexander, he published the book Realm of Wealth: The 9 Cycles of Prosperity and embarked on a career as a speaker and marketer of his own financial self-help program. He was associated with a Panamanian company marketing "prosperity" programs but was dismissed when his past became known.

When confronted about his past, McQuirter said he is no longer involved with white supremacism: "I was a different person 25 years ago. I have learned something important over the many years since 1980 – that it was not possible for me to change my past, but it was possible for me to change."

In 2009, McQuirter renounced and apologized for his racist past in an exclusive interview with the National Post's Stewart Bell.
