= Heritage Front =

Canadian white supremacist group

- Abbreviation: HF
- Formation: 1989
- Founder: Wolfgang Droege; Gerry Lincoln; Grant Bristow; James Scott Dawson
- Dissolved: c. 2005
- Type: Neo-Nazism; White supremacism; White nationalism; Antisemitism
- Location: Canada
- Publication: Up Front

The Heritage Front was a Canadian neo-Nazi white supremacist organization founded in 1989 and disbanded around 2005.

The Heritage Front maintained a telephone message line with a different editorial each day. The voice on the hotline was Gary Schipper. The line resulted in complaints to the Canadian Human Rights Commission and hearings into allegations that the group violated Canada's hate crime laws. The group organized a series of white power rock concerts in Toronto and elsewhere. Immediately after one of these concerts, a Tamil man, Sivarajah Vinasithamby, 41, returning home from work was beaten and partially paralyzed by several white power skinheads who had just left the concert.

== History ==
The Heritage Front was founded in 1989 by former Nationalist Party of Canada members Wolfgang Droege, Gerry Lincoln, Grant Bristow (a plant working for the Canadian Security Intelligence Service (CSIS)) and James Scott Dawson. They were joined by Al Overfield and other former members of the Nationalist Party who had become disenchanted with Don Andrews's leadership and felt that a new organization and tactics were necessary. The idea for the new group was developed in early September 1989 when a delegation of 18 Canadian far right activists were visiting Libya at the invitation of Muammar al-Gaddafi, who was celebrating the twentieth anniversary of his regime. The Heritage Front formed an alliance with the Church of the Creator and its Canadian leader George Burdi. Other prominent figures in the Canadian far right, such as Paul Fromm and Ernst Zündel, worked with the Heritage Front but did not join the organization.

In 1992, the Heritage Front illegally brought prominent American neo-Nazis Tom Metzger and his son John Metzger to Canada to speak, and provided security at a speech by Holocaust denier David Irving. Droege retired in 1995, following legal troubles, and handed leadership over to Marc Lemire. Under Lemire's leadership, the membership of the group declined rapidly, and by 2005 it existed in name only. Now it is defunct.

The activities of the Heritage Front led to the formation of an Anti-Racist Action (ARA) branch in Toronto, which engaged in a series of demonstrations and confrontations with the Heritage Front, culminating in 1993 with a riot on Parliament Hill between members of ARA and the Heritage Front after a concert by George Burdi's rock band RaHoWa. Four Heritage Front members, including Burdi, were arrested and charged with assault. Burdi was sentenced to a year in prison for aggravated assault, and later dropped out of the movement and renounced racism. A month after the clash in Ottawa, ARA held a militant demonstration outside the Toronto home of Gary Schipper, which resulted in damage to the property. Droege and other members of the Heritage Front responded that evening by attacking members of ARA outside of Sneaky Dee's, a known ARA hangout, resulting in Droege and other Heritage Front members being charged with assault. In 1995, Droege was convicted of the assault and sentenced to five months in prison. He also spent time in jail for contempt of court and other violations relating to the Canadian Human Rights Commission tribunal.

Grant Bristow, a mole for the Canadian Security Intelligence Service (CSIS), infiltrated the group and became one of its leaders. According to the CSIS and Bristow, their aim was to gather intelligence on the far right and to suppress its violent activity. Bristow's role in the group was made public in 1994 by the Toronto Sun, and became the subject of an inquiry by the Security Intelligence Review Committee, which published a report on the matter in that same year.

== See also ==
- Elisa Hategan (Heritage Front spokesperson, later defected and testified against the group)
- Fascism in Canada
- List of white nationalist organizations
- Neo-Nazism in Canada
