= Schippers =

Schippers is a Dutch occupational surname meaning skipper's. Notable people with the surname include:

- Dafne Schippers (born 1992), Dutch heptathlete and sprinter
- Daniela Schippers (born 1995), Guatemalan tennis player
- David Schippers, American lawyer
- Edith Schippers (born 1964), Dutch politician
- K. Schippers (1936–2021), Dutch poet, prose writer and art critic
- Paulina Schippers (born 1991), Guatemalan tennis player
- Thomas Schippers (1930–1977), American conductor
- Willem Schippers (1867–1954), Dutch author, metalworker
- Wim T. Schippers (born 1942), Dutch artist, comedian and voice actor

== See also ==
- Schipper
