= Operation Red Dog =

1981 failed white supremacist coup in Dominica

- Type: Attempted coup d'état
- Locations: Intended target: Dominica; Arrest location: New Orleans, U.S.
- Planned by: Patrick John, Wolfgang Droege, Don Black, Mike Perdue, Sydney Burnett-Alleyne, James Alexander McQuirter
- Target: Government of Eugenia Charles
- Objective: Restoration of Patrick John as Prime Minister of Dominica, establishment of businesses in Dominica
- Date: 27 April 1981
- Outcome: Plot thwarted by the Bureau of Alcohol, Tobacco and Firearms
- Casualties: None

Operation Red Dog was a failed 1981 plot to overthrow the government of Dominica and restore former prime minister Patrick John to power. Its participants included long-time Ku Klux Klan member Mike Perdue, German-Canadian Nazi Wolfgang Droege, American white nationalist Don Black, Canadian James Alexander McQuirter, and plot leader Sydney Burnett-Alleyne.

The conspirators planned to travel by boat to Dominica and rendezvous with John and an armed group on the island. The plot was exposed after boat captain Michael S. Howell, whom Perdue approached to provide a vessel, contacted the Bureau of Alcohol, Tobacco and Firearms (ATF). John was arrested in Dominica on April 25, 1981, and two days later Droege and eight other men were arrested in New Orleans as they prepared to depart.

== Mission ==
On April 27, 1981, Droege and eight other men, including Canadian James Alexander McQuirter and American Don Black, who later founded the white nationalist website Stormfront, were arrested by federal agents in New Orleans as they prepared to board a boat supplied with automatic weapons, shotguns, rifles, handguns, dynamite, ammunition, and a black and white Nazi flag.

The plan was to charter a boat to Dominica and rendezvous via rubber boats with Patrick John and his makeshift army. The genesis of the idea came from long-time Klan member Perdue, who was introduced in 1979 to Droege. That summer, Perdue outlined his plan to overthrow the government of Grenada and set up several lucrative businesses. After their meeting, they determined that Droege would locate funds and resources. Croatian-Canadian Don Andrews was initially involved, but after Perdue changed the target island to Dominica, Andrews withdrew. Klansmen Arnie Polli and Roger Dermee were paid US$3,000 to visit Dominica and make a preliminary reconnaissance. German-Canadian Nazi Martin K. Weiche was allegedly a financial backer of the plot, along with James White of Houston and L. E. Matthews of Jackson, Mississippi.

In February 1981, the captain and crew backed out. Perdue approached Michael S. Howell, a local boat captain and Vietnam War veteran. Perdue said that the Central Intelligence Agency needed his boat for a covert operation. Howell then contacted the US Bureau of Alcohol, Tobacco and Firearms (ATF). On April 25, John was arrested in Dominica. When Perdue learned of the arrest and that their plans were no longer secret, he insisted that the mission should continue. On April 27, the group, including three undercover ATF agents, met at the predetermined location, loaded the van and proceeded to a marina where local police were waiting for them.

On June 21, 1981, lawyer J.W. Kirkpatrick of Memphis, linked to the coup attempt by court testimony, died from a self-inflicted gunshot wound. Perdue testified that he received $10,000 from Kirkpatrick to finance the assault on Dominica. Kirkpatrick was the brother-in-law of former congressional representative E.C. 'Took' Gathings (D-AR). Friends said that Kirkpatrick had extremely conservative political views, as did the former congressman, and thought the coup would prevent a communist takeover. One colleague said Kirkpatrick was a "super-ultra-ultra-ultra-conservative," who "thought the country was going to hell in a hand-basket." Perdue also testified that he used $70,000 collected from businessmen to purchase weapons, dynamite and other military equipment, and to pay for reconnaissance trips to Dominica.

In 1984, during an interview by Barbados's daily Nation Newspaper, Sydney Burnett-Alleyne, one of the leaders of the plot, was asked if the group had planned to overthrow the government of Barbados and install John as prime minister there as well. He responded:

He could have become prime minister, although that was not the real reason behind my plan of action. I wanted to add the land mass of Dominica to that of Barbados and also to be able to undertake an industrial project of considerable size. South African resources, millions of dollars, were available to me to be used for such a project. But Patrick John didn't do what was supposed to have been done. But more than that, I became incensed when I found out he was giving away Dominican land to Americans. He lost an important opportunity to be a central figure in the history of the Caribbean.

A book about the plot, Bayou of Pigs, by Canadian journalist Stewart Bell, was published in August 2008.

== See also ==
- Abaco Independence Movement
- Frederick Newton
- Knights of the Golden Circle
- Republic of Minerva
- Ku Klux Klan in Canada
- The Nine Nations of North America
- Operation Gideon (2020)
