= R v Andrews =

Supreme Court of Canada case on wilful promotion of hatred

- Supreme Court of Canada

Hearing: December 4 and 5, 1989 Judgment: December 13, 1990
- Full case name: Donald Clarke Andrews and Robert Wayne Smith v. Her Majesty the Queen
- Citations: [1990] 3 S.C.R. 870
- Docket No.: 21034
- Prior history: Judgment for the Crown in the Court of Appeal for Ontario.
- Ruling: Appeal dismissed

Holding
- Applying R. v. Keegstra, the Criminal Code prohibitions on publicly inciting or promoting hatred against an identifiable group is constitutional.

Court membership
- Chief Justice: Brian Dickson; Puisne Justices: Antonio Lamer, Bertha Wilson, Gérard La Forest, Claire L'Heureux-Dubé, John Sopinka, Charles Gonthier, Peter Cory, Beverley McLachlin

Reasons given
- Majority: Dickson C.J., joined by Wilson, L'Heureux-Dubé and Gonthier JJ.
- Dissent: McLachlin J., joined by Sopinka J.
- Dissent: La Forest J.
- Lamer and Cory JJ. took no part in the consideration or decision of the case.

R v Andrews, [1990] 3 S.C.R. 870 is a decision of the Supreme Court of Canada on the freedom of expression under section 2(b) of the Canadian Charter of Rights and Freedoms. It is a companion case to R v Keegstra. The Court upheld the criminal provision that prohibits communicating statements that wilfully promote hatred.

== Background ==
Donald Andrews was the leader of a white supremacist political group known as the Nationalist Party of Canada and Robert Smith was the party secretary. Together they were in charge of the party's bi-monthly magazine called the National Reporter which made claims against the Jewish and black peoples. Both Andrews and Smith were charged with "unlawfully communicating statements, other than in private conversation, which willfully promoted hatred against an identifiable group" contrary to s. 319(2) of the Criminal Code.

At trial they were found guilty for promoting hatred. On appeal to the Court of Appeal for Ontario Justice Cory found that section 319(2) violated section 2(b) of the Charter but could be justified under section 1.

The question before the Supreme Court was

1. whether s. 319(2) of the Criminal Code violated section 2(b) of the Charter, and if so, whether the violation was justifiable under section 1.
2. whether s. 319(3)(a) of the Criminal Code violated section 11(d) of the Charter, and if so, whether the violation was justifiable under section 1.

The court held that section 319(2) and 319(3)(a) violated the Charter but were saved under section 1.

== Reasons of the majority ==
Chief Justice Dickson, writing for the majority, upheld the Criminal Code provisions. Dickson looked to his decision in R. v. Keegstra and applied the reasoning from that decision, coming to the same conclusion that the law should be upheld.

== See also ==
- List of Supreme Court of Canada cases (Dickson Court)
