= Elisa Hategan =

Canadian anti-racist activist and author

Elisa Hategan (born December 17, 1974), formerly known as Elisse Hategan, is a Romanian-Canadian author, freelance journalist, and antiracist activist. As a teenager she was a member and spokesperson for the Heritage Front, a now-defunct white supremacist organization in Canada. She broke with the group and testified against them in court, and has been credited for contributing to the organization's demise.

== Early life and education ==
Hategan was born in Bucharest, Romania in 1974. When she was 11 years old, she emigrated to Canada with her father, joining her mother who had moved to Canada earlier. Her father returned to Romania, where he died in 1988, leaving Elisa with her mother in Toronto, where they lived in the Regent Park neighbourhood. She grew up in poverty and was a victim of domestic violence.

Hategan graduated magna cum laude from the University of Ottawa in 1999 with a degree in criminology and psychology.

== Involvement with the Heritage Front ==
She was recruited by the Heritage Front in 1991, when she was 16 years old, after running away from home and being placed in foster care. She was "groomed to be the young, female voice of the movement".

Hategan turned on the group in 1993 after it became increasingly violent and began targeting LGBT activists and she came to the realization that she was gay herself. She began secretly passing information on the Heritage Front to anti-racist activists.

In the same year she was charged with hate crimes for distributing a Heritage Front leaflet. The charges were later dropped after it was revealed she gave the document to anti-racist activists in order to warn them. When Heritage Front leader Wolfgang Droege and other figures in the organization were tried for criminal offences, she testified against them in court.

In 1995, she appeared as a witness before a parliamentary subcommittee investigating the Heritage Front and the Canadian Security Intelligence Service's involvement in the Grant Bristow affair.

== Antiracism activism ==
Her self-published memoir, Race Traitor: The True Story Of Canadian Intelligence Service’s Greatest Cover-up (2014) is about "her experiences in the Heritage Front and when she turned against it".

Hategan's articles have appeared in Maclean's magazine, Global News, Canadian Jewish News, and NOW Magazine.

In recent years, Hategan has given speeches and been active as an educator against racism, extremism, and the white supremacist movement.

== Legal issues ==
In late 2018, Hategan filed a lawsuit in the Ontario Superior Court of Justice against Elizabeth Moore, who had been part of the Heritage Front at the same time as Hategan, and Bernie Farber. Hategan alleged that Moore, who had also left the Heritage Front and campaigned against anti-semitism afterwards, "appropriated aspects of Hategan’s life and identity for Moore’s benefit and financial gain."

The suit was dismissed, with presiding Justice Jane Ferguson stating that "Instead of providing supporting evidence, Ms. Hategan relies on speculation, unfounded allegations, and conspiracy theories." Ferguson called the suit "frivolous" and a "waste of time". Hategan was denied appeal by the Court of Appeal for Ontario. She was ordered to pay CA$200,000 in damages and permanently barred from making any public statements about Moore.

== Personal life ==
In 2001, Hategan discovered that her father had had Jewish roots. In 2006, she changed her first name to Elisa. She converted to Judaism in 2013. She is openly gay.
