= Social Credit Party of Ontario =

Defunct Canadian provincial political party

The Social Credit Party of Ontario (SCPO) (also known as the Ontario Social Credit League, Social Credit Association of Ontario and the Union of Electors) was a minor political party at the provincial level in the Canadian province of Ontario from the 1940s to the early 1980s. The party never won any seats in the Legislative Assembly of Ontario. It was affiliated with the Social Credit Party of Canada and part of the social credit movement which espoused social credit theories of monetary reform.

== 1940s and 1950s and early 1960s ==
Aside from the 1937 general election and a 1940 by-election, two occasions in which M. Alexandre Denomme ran as a Social Credit candidate in Ottawa East, Social Credit appears to have been inactive in Ontario until 1945 when eight candidates stood in the province for the federal party in the 1945 federal election. The Ontario Social Credit party ran three candidates in the 1945 provincial election.

In 1946, the Ontario Social Credit movement split as a result of Ernest Manning's growing hostility to Douglasites and antisemites in the movement.

The official Ontario Social Credit League was headed by John J. Fitzgerald and William Ovens. Ron Gostick, a far right propagandist and editor of The Voice of the Electors, established the Union of Electors as a rival organization inspired by the more radical Quebec social credit organization, Union des electeurs led by Louis Even.

Like Even's group, the Union rejected the party system and ran not as a partisan political party but as a citizen's organization compelling their elected representatives to represent the will of the people. Like the Quebec-based Union, it also believed in a more orthodox application of social credit economic theory and was more openly antisemitic. In October 1947, the Ontario Social Credit League held an emergency convention which repudiated Gostick and the Union for infringing the League's rights.

In the 1948 provincial election, the Union of Electors fielded 13 candidates, while two candidates ran under the Social Credit label. Neither group won a seat; the Union received approximately 0.5 per cent of the provincial vote. Gostick finished third in Glengarry with 642 votes. In 1949, the Ontario Union of Electors was accused by the Toronto Labour Council of "disseminating racial hatred in its crudest form."

Both parties then went dormant running no candidates in the 1951 or 1955 provincial elections, though Mel Rowat ran as an "Independent Social Credit" candidate in 1955 in Stormont. The federal party continued to run candidates in Ontario during federal elections throughout the 1950s. In the 1959 provincial election the Social Credit party ran five candidates under the leadership of Edgar Shipley Birrell. Birrell, a Toronto furrier, Social Credit member since 1944, and Leaside town councillor from 1955 to 1960 had been elected party leader in February 1959, and stood as the party's candidate in York East Birrell remained party leader until March 1962. Philip Kelly, a former minister of mines in the Ontario government of Leslie Frost, was elected the party's leader in March 1962 but quit several months later over a policy dispute.

== 1963 schism ==
In 1963, the party split into two factions. "Social Credit Action" was established by Neil Carmichael, a stamp and coin dealer, who was chosen the group's leader, Carmichael's membership in the Ontario Social Credit Party had not been renewed after he made antisemitic statements. Other founders of the splinter group were James Audy, an accountant, who became party president, and David Hartman of Toronto. The group was formed when the official party refused to actively campaign in the 1963 provincial election. Audy had been the federal Social Credit Party's candidate in Spadina riding in the previous election.

Carmichael, 45, a five-time federal Socred candidate, had been the focus of controversy earlier that year when he was a federal Social Credit candidate in St. Paul's. He asserted at a public meeting that there was a Jewish conspiracy in which the Rothschilds were plotting to acquire all of Canada's mines through non-Jewish third party operatives, and that the family was part of an international Jewish conspiracy to take over all of Canada's businesses. Carmichael was cautioned by the Social Credit Party of Ontario that he was "skating on thin ice" and would not be permitted to stand as a candidate again. His promise that a Social Credit government would pay each Canadian $5,000 worth of goods and services was derided by the Ontario party as "irresponsible". David Lewis of the New Democratic Party accused Social Credit of "harbouring anti-Semites" and stated that "Carmichael is only a symptom. The disease goes much deeper." Carmichael denied he was antisemitic, saying "I am not anti-Semitic. ... I have many Jewish friends. ... Many of my customers are Jewish." At a subsequent meeting, he said that his comments were "indiscreet", that had he known he was going to be quoted he would have "cloaked them in nice phrases", and accused the Jews of persecuting him for his remarks, blaming a reporter with a Jewish-sounding name for quoting him. In the same meeting Carmichael declared that Adolf Hitler's economic system was "a very good and sound system of money" and that the Nazis "had it all figured out so that there was no unemployment." Carmichael's Social Credit membership was not renewed prior to his formation of Social Credit Action.

Social Credit Action supported Réal Caouette when he took his Ralliement des creditistes out of the Social Credit Party of Canada in September 1963, while the official party remained loyal to federal party leader Robert N. Thompson. Audy accused the Ontario Social Credit Association of being dominated by Protestant clergyman who were prejudiced against Caouette because he was a Catholic. Richard Day, a spokesperson for the official Social Credit League of Ontario derided the views of Social Credit Action as being "anti-Semitic, economic trash and hypocritical".

Social Credit Action nominated six candidates in ridings in Toronto in the 1963 provincial election, while the official party, leaderless since the resignation of Philip Kelly the previous year, nominated only three candidates in rural ridings. The Social Credit Action candidates included Carmichael, Audy, Hartman and fascist John Ross Taylor. However, when it was reported that "the former leader of the Canadian Union of Fascists was running", the splinter group disassociated itself from Taylor on the eve of the election and he instead ran as a "Natural Order of Social Credit Organization" candidate. Audy was announced by Caouette as his Ontario lieutenant but did not end up running in the 1965 federal election.

Subsequently, Carmichael was accused of allowing the Social Credit Action headquarters to become a meeting place and organizing centre for neo-Nazis disseminating antisemitic material, such as David Stanley and John Beattie. Carmichael denied the charge saying "we feel the Jews are trying to stir up hate this way to sell their Israel bonds." In October, the press reported that antisemitic leaflets were being distributed recruiting 14- to 21-year-olds to the right-wing "Canada Youth Corps" where they could be trained in explosives and weapons. The leaflets featured photographs of Carmichael and Stanley and promoted meetings at the Social Credit Action headquarters. Carmichael denied any knowledge of the leaflets or the Canada Youth Corps, and dissociated himself from Stanley. Carmichael and Beattie clashed in the press in April 1965 after Beattie announced the formation of the Canadian Nazi Party announcing that he intended to recruit the "snivelling cowards" in Carmichael's Social Credit movement. Carmichael accused Beattie of trying to discredit his party.

By the 1967 provincial election, Social Credit Action had disappeared. The official Social Credit party had elected Wilmer F. Trefold as its new leader in October 1963, the month after the provincial election. In November 1966, Harvey Lainson was elected leader and he led the party in the 1967 election, in which it ran seven candidates.

== Fascist takeover and split ==
In the early 1970s, the radical Edmund Burke Society (EBS) infiltrated the party; Paul Fromm was elected as the party's president and other EBSers to the executive. In the 1971 provincial election, three of five Social Credit candidates running in the election were avowed "Burkers". The party had no identified leader, but Fromm acted as its media spokesman. By 1972, the party had been taken over by the EBS which now called itself the Western Guard. As a result, the party was put under trusteeship at the instigation of the federal party which declared membership in the Western Guard to be "incompatible" with membership in Social Credit. The federal Social Credit Party disavowed the Social Credit Association of Ontario led by John Ross Taylor of the Western Guard and instead recognized the "Ontario Social Credit League", established in 1973 under the leadership of Bruce Arnold.

In the 1975 Ontario election, the "Ontario Social Credit League", led by Alcide Hamelin, fielded 12 candidates, mostly in rural areas, but they were not officially recognized as such as the party did not run enough candidates or otherwise qualify for official party status under the newly passed Election Finances Reform Act, 1975. while the "Social Credit Association of Ontario" ran three candidates as independents in Metro Toronto who were disavowed by the League as supporters of the Western Guard. In the 1974 federal election, the Ontario Social Credit Association endorsed Martin Weiche as a candidate in Trinity co-endorsed by the Western Guard; because the party was not officially registered with Elections Canada, their federal candidates were officially listed as independents.

The Social Credit League ran seven candidates in the 1977 provincial election and several candidates ran as "Independent Social Credit". Also in 1977, Western Guard leader Don Andrews was convicted of plotting to bomb the Israeli basketball team and was forced to sever his ties with the Western Guard freeing the way for John Ross Taylor to become the group's leader. He folded his Social Credit Association and became leader of the renamed Western Guard Party.

== Later years ==
Reg Gervais was leader of the Ontario Social Credit Party in 1981 and announced prior to the March 1981 provincial election that he planned to run in Nickel Belt, but did not follow through. John Turmel claimed to be the interim leader of the Ontario Social Credit Party during the campaign running 3 candidates in the Ottawa area.

In October 1981, the Ontario Social Credit Party conducted a leadership convention. The eleven delegates, who represented about 100 party members throughout the province, elected former Toronto mayoral candidate Anne C. McBride as their new leader in a vote of 7 to 1 with 3 spoiled ballots. McBride was a Nova Scotia-born ordained minister in the Assemblies of God, a Pentecostal Christian denomination. She vowed to run the party "on Christian principles". At various times, McBride ran for mayor of Toronto, tried to form her own United Party of Canada in the early 1980s, and sought the leadership of the federal Social Credit Party of Canada at the 1982 Social Credit leadership convention, and was a perennial candidate in federal, provincial, and municipal elections. However, under her leadership, the party failed to run candidates for the Ontario legislature in any subsequent election and eventually became inactive.

By the 1985 provincial election, the party was defunct. However, Turmel still claimed to be a "Social Credit" candidate in at least one provincial by-election in the late 1980s. Turmel attempted to create a new Social Credit Party of Ontario in the mid-1980s. He was unable to meet the criteria in place at that time for the registration of new political parties, which included filing a petition signed by 10,000 qualified voters.

== Leaders ==
- 1945 election - John J. Fitzgerald and William Ovens (Social Credit League)
- 1948 election - Ron Gostick (Union of Electors)
- 1959—1962 - Edgar Shipley Birrell
- 1962 - Philip Kelly
- 1963 election - James Audy (Social Credit Action)
- October 1963 — 1966 Wilmer F. Trefold (Social Credit Association)
- November 1966 — 1967 election - Harvey Lainson (Social Credit Association)
- 1971 election - Paul Fromm (Social Credit Association president and spokesman)
- 1972—1977 - John Ross Taylor (Social Credit Association, disavowed by federal party)
- 1973—1975 - Bruce Arnold (Social Credit League)
- 1975 election - Alcide Hamelin (Social Credit League)
- 1981 election - Reg Gervais (disputed by John Turmel who claimed to be interim leader)
- October 1981—1982 - Anne C. McBride

== Election results ==
Election results
Election year	Leader	No. of overall votes	% of overall total	No. of candidates run	No. of seats won	+/−	Presence
1937		528	0.03%	1	0 / 90	New Party	Extra-parliamentary
1943		-	-	0	0 / 90	0	Extra-parliamentary
1945		852	0.05%	3	0 / 90	0	Extra-parliamentary
1948	Ron Gostick (Union of Electors), none (Social Credit League)	9,214 (U of E); 734 (SCL)	0.52% (U of E); 0.04% (SCL)	13 (U of E); 2 (SCL)	0 / 125	0	Extra-parliamentary
1951		-	-	0	0 / 90	0	Extra-parliamentary
1955		602	0.03%	1 (Independent SC)	0 / 98	0	Extra-parliamentary
1959	E. Shipley Birrell	1,740	0.09%	5	0 / 98	0	Extra-parliamentary
1963	James Audy (Social Credit Action), none (Social Credit Association)	2,313	0.11%	6 (SCAction); 3 (SCAssociation)	0 / 108	0	Extra-parliamentary
1967	Harvey Lainson	1,906	0.08%	7	0 / 117	0	Extra-parliamentary
1971		1,204	0.04%	5	0 / 117	0	Extra-parliamentary
1975	Alcide Hamelin (Social Credit League)	4,146	0.13%	13	0 / 125	0	Extra-parliamentary
1977		1,698	0.05%	7	0 / 125	0	Extra-parliamentary
1981	Reg Gervais	1,054	0.03%	3	0 / 125	0	Extra-parliamentary

== See also ==
- Canadian social credit movement
- Social Credit Party of Canada
- John Turmel
- List of Ontario political parties
