= Grant Bristow =

Canadian spy (born 1958)

Grant Bristow (born February 1958 in Winnipeg, Manitoba) was employed as an undercover spy, or mole, for the Canadian Security Intelligence Service (CSIS), who co-founded and successfully infiltrated the Heritage Front white supremacist group for six years. Several months after the assignment, Bristow was exposed by Toronto Sun reporter Bill Dunphy, in August 1994. His work inside the Heritage Front became highly controversial in Canada, when exposed, due to much of his activity being viewed as that of a contributory nature, reflected by an August 14, 1994 Toronto Sun headline, "Spy Unmasked: CSIS Informant 'Founding Father' of white racist group".

== Career and initial CSIS work ==
Grant Bristow began his career as a private investigator, working with several Toronto-based investigation firms through the early and mid-1980s. Through this work, he developed both the personality and resources necessary to perform covert infiltrations and intelligence gathering. Bristow's CSIS involvement commenced in 1986 through an official at the South African embassy. He was hired to perform security work at their Ottawa embassy, which was the target of many demonstrations at the time due to the nation's continued Apartheid policy. According to an interview Bristow gave to The Walrus in September 2004, and as implied in the SIRC report of December 1995, one of two Embassy officials he had contact with at the time also requested he gather and provide intelligence on the Canadian anti-Apartheid demonstrators individually. He says he was opposed to this idea (gathering intelligence on Canadians for a foreign government), desiring only to provide security for the embassy. However, he feigned interest in the proposal and secretly arranged a meeting with a CSIS officer to report the Official's request. This meeting marked the beginning of Bristow's involvement with the intelligence agency. Following the meeting with the CSIS representative Bristow proceeded to co-operate, reporting details on the progression of the 'mission'. His work was successful and on August 20, 1986, the Canadian government expelled one of the South African officials and prohibited the other from re-entry to Canada designating him persona non grata.

== Introduction to the Canadian far-right ==
He maintained his relationship with CSIS and the following year (while employed by day as an in-house investigator for a shipping firm), after being introduced through an acquaintance to far-right activist Max French, reported the introduction to his handlers. Satisfied with his previous performance, they encouraged him to befriend French and see what information he could gather on the activities of Canada's far-right. Due to his lack of any substantive knowledge, Bristow was given a crash-course introduction to the major players of the far-Right, as well as a copy of the Turner Diaries to familiarize himself with. His relationship with French bore little fruit and was short-lived. Fortunately for Bristow, an associate subsequently introduced him to another far-right sympathizer who provided an "in" via Don Andrews' Nationalist Party of Canada. It was through this introduction and his attendance of Nationalist Party meetings that he made the connections and gathered the information that allowed the commencement of what was to be called "Operation Governor".

== Operation Governor begins ==
Operation Governor began in the autumn of 1988. Its original scope was extremely broad, with no particular targets or goals. Its primary function was basically nothing more than gathering any and all information available to him. The Autumn of 1988 was an ideal time for this mission to begin primarily because many of the groups were lacking in numbers and intelligent membership. As an educated professional, Bristow was an attractive prospect. These factors made it simpler for him to infiltrate without raising any eyebrows. Bristow quickly became friends with Party leader Don Andrews, crediting their fast friendship with "mirroring", an intelligence technique where one mimics the target's thoughts and feelings, forging a bond to gain trust. Through his friendship with Andrews, he attended a 'Welcome Home' party for Wolfgang Droege, returning from a US prison where he served time for cocaine trafficking and a weapons charge. This was his first encounter with Droege, with whom he immediately struck up rapport. After a few conversations he realized that unlike the primarily verbal Andrews, Droege was the real thing. He was interested in taking real action in support of his extreme ideas, which motivated Bristow to slowly move his focus and efforts from Andrews to Droege.

In total, Bristow was paid $50,000 by CSIS.

== Nationalist Party and Libya visit ==
As time progressed and Bristow became further involved in the far-right, he was promoted from member to Security Chief of the Nationalist Party. Throughout this time his friendship with Droege continued to grow, with Droege revealing more and more about himself and his past. Looking back on these times in 2005, Bristow said, "I was keeping watch over violent hate groups, it was the right thing to do." From this position, he screened and collected detailed personal information on all new members, which was promptly copied and forwarded to CSIS. By mid-1989 however, Droege was increasingly dissatisfied with Andrews and the Party and began considering a departure to form a new group more to his liking.

In late July 1989, Libyan head of state Muammar al-Gaddafi invited delegates from the Nationalist party to attend celebrations for the 20th Anniversary of his revolution, all expenses paid. Andrews was unable to attend due to legal obligations, so Droege and Bristow went together at Droege's insistence. Their flight to Libya took them to Rome, where Italian Intelligence officers detained them and unsuccessfully attempted to convince them to cancel their Libyan visit. They arrived in Tripoli with many other extremists from around the world (Qadaffi had invited many leaders of far-left and far-right movements around the world, hoping to unite them in opposition to their common enemy in Zionism), but despite their best efforts Droege left with only a $1,000(US) gift.

On their way home the plane stopped in Chicago, where due to his previous trafficking convictions Droege was arrested (having been barred from entering the United States) and detained, while Bristow was again detained as well and strip-searched. He was furious upon his return (Droege was still being held by US authorities), having gone through terrible stress worrying that either foreign intelligence service encounter could have blown his cover. He fumed at his CSIS handlers, accusing them of using him as "an expendable pawn." This prompted the amendment of his agreement with them to include that he 'must be informed beforehand of any future takedowns'.

== The Heritage Front saga ==
Prior to Droege's release from U.S. custody and subsequent return to Canada, he became convinced that Andrews had somehow arranged his arrest, the final catalyst in the formation of what was to be the Heritage Front. Bristow was along every step of the way, a close confidant of Droege's throughout this period. Bristow claims that he used this confidence to dissuade Droege from undertaking a number of potentially illegal or violent acts. As the Front was formed and began to grow, Bristow documented and relayed to CSIS details of an eco-terrorism plot against North American agriculture being promoted by an American Aryan Nations member to Droege. Bristow managed to talk Droege out of going to Libyan agents in New York with the information, which was altogether scientifically unsound anyhow. It was nonetheless a sobering indication of the extremes to which Droege would go, and provided further justification for the mission to CSIS.

During this period, Bristow got to know the upper echelons of Canadian and international white supremacy and revisionism, serving as a bodyguard for both David Irving and Ernst Zündel. As well, Droege sent Bristow to rendezvous with Terry Long, leader of the Canadian chapter of Aryan Nations. Immediately taking to Bristow, Long passed on the membership list of his group with 180 names for Droege's use, which Bristow copied and provided to CSIS. After this success (and a CSIS-sponsored British vacation), he left with Droege and Zündel for an international Far-right symposium in Germany. In his capacity as security for the Canadian contingent, he video and photodocumented the conference, again providing the data to CSIS. The conference was raided by German Police, however, and Droege and Bristow narrowly avoided arrest. The arrest of Zündel in the raid dashed CSIS' hopes of identifying the major foreign financiers of Canada's Far-right.

Shortly after his return to Canada he was dispatched by the Front to travel to Richard Butler's famed Aryan Nations compound in Idaho. CSIS agreed to this, hoping to acquire the identities of Canadian attendees. It was here that the interconnectedness of the North American Far-right became clear, and the prevailing danger evident. Visits from major American racists like Tom Metzger of White Aryan Resistance were cut short through Bristow's disclosing to CSIS of their whereabouts, so they could be arrested and deported.

== Final days in the Front ==
It was from the publicity generated by these sorts of arrests that major opposition to the Front began to rise. Groups like Anti-Racist Action began to appear, and were present whenever the Front was in Court or on the streets. Tensions were building, and so were numbers on both sides. Bristow walked a very fine line, his role in CSIS preventing him from engaging in the ever-growing violence, a potential Achilles' Heel for his ongoing espionage. These demonstrations and counter-demonstrations culminated in a riot in Ottawa on May 29, 1993, with physical attacks taking place against parties on both sides. These events culminated in calls by the majority of young and angry Front members for retaliatory attacks, and when these calls went unanswered by the Front's leadership, a splinter gang of violent white power skinheads was formed. Bristow passed an emergency message onto his CSIS handlers. Immediately this gang sprang into action, robbing a donut shop the first night and threatening a major attack on the Canadian Jewish Congress. The group had a large weapons cache when police apprehended them.

Soon after these incidents and under the guise of job-hunting, Bristow took a US vacation to marry his girlfriend. Upon his return it became evident he would be forced to terminate his involvement with the front, as Droege was being charged with assault and if Droege was imprisoned, Bristow would become the de facto leader of the Front, an untenable position for a government-employed mole. The exit wouldn't be easy, but not terribly difficult either. Due to the legal hurdles and a general dwindling of support (both public and internal), the Front was beginning to fade. Bristow soon informed Droege of his plan to leave the movement for a job in Eastern Canada, Droege was sad but grateful for the friendship they had and Bristow's efforts for the movement. It was March 1994 when Operation Governor officially concluded, Bristow having prepared dossiers on remaining Far-righters who still posed a threat of some sort beforehand.

== Bristow's exposure ==
On August 12, 1994, Bristow was contacted by Toronto Sun reporter Bill Dunphy, who informed him he was about to go to press with a story about Bristow's being a CSIS asset and exposing much of his Front activity through the duration of his work. Given the violent tendencies of his former targets, Bristow requested Dunphy not to publish the story, but Dunphy insisted and went to press just two days later — on 14 August 1994. Bristow realized he had to get his family and himself out of Toronto and into hiding immediately and CSIS obliged. They were first moved to Jasper for a brief stay and opportunity to evade the situation while plans were made. Eventually resettled in Alberta, his 1995 return to Toronto for a funeral again found him caught by the media, with a CSIS crisis team having to meet to deal with a Toronto Star reporter's questions and subsequent publishing of the identities of and photos of both Bristow and his wife. Feeling apathetic by this point due to stress, they decided simply to return home and hope for the best.

== 2004 media interview ==
For the first time, Bristow decided in September 2004 to break his silence regarding the whole issue, and granted an in-depth interview to the Canadian current affairs magazine The Walrus, which led to a resurgence of media coverage around the issue. In the interview, Bristow gives details about his time with CSIS, activities before and after the affair and his current life. While he remains concerned about retaliation, he has largely moved on in his life and has let go of the past.
