= Walter Droege =

German billionaire businessman

- Born: Walter P.J. Droege; 1952 or 1953 (age 72–73)
- Occupation: Businessman
- Title: Founder and CEO, Droege International Group

Walter P.J. Droege (born 1952/1953) is a German billionaire businessman, who is the founder and board member of Droege International Group.

Walter Droege founded Droege International Group AG, which provides restructuring and turnaround advisory services, in 1988 in Düsseldorf, Germany. Droege was CEO of the company from its founding until 2018, when his eldest son, Ernest-W. Droege, succeeded him in the role.

According to Forbes, as of April 2019, Droege's net worth had been $6.4 billion. In 2020, this decreased to $2.5 billion.

Droege is married with at least one son, and lives in Düsseldorf, Germany.
