= Edmund Burke Society (Toronto) =

Defunct Canadian far-right organization

- Abbreviation: EBS
- Named after: Edmund Burke
- Successor: Western Guard
- Formation: 1967
- Founder: Paul Fromm; Don Andrews; Al Overfield; Leigh Smith
- Dissolved: 1972
- Purpose: Political advocacy group: anti-communism; right-wing politics
- Headquarters: Toronto
- Location: Canada

The Edmund Burke Society (EBS) was a conservative organization in Toronto, Canada formed by Paul Fromm, Don Andrews, Al Overfield, Leigh Smith in 1967 at the University of Toronto. The group presented a front of being anti-communist and promoting traditionalist values in order to recruit members into its real agenda. Its members soon became involved in violent confrontations with anti-war groups and leftists in Toronto.

The group's main focus was opposition to the New Left and other left wing tendencies that were prominent during the period and which the Burkers identified with Communism. During the 1968 federal election, they distributed leaflets accusing the new Liberal Prime Minister, Pierre Trudeau, of being a communist. The "Burkers" were involved in disrupting various left-wing events and rallies, often violently. In 1970, the group disrupted a speech by William Kunstler resulting in the Chicago Seven's lawyer drenching EBSer Paul Fromm with a pitcher of water. A melee between Burkers and Kunstler's supporters ensued and Fromm was knocked unconscious to the floor. According to a report by the Security Intelligence Review Committee, in 1971, Burker Geza Matrai, a Hungarian refugee, attacked Soviet Premier Alexei Kosygin during his visit to Canada. Matrai jumped on Kosygin's back, dragging him halfway to the ground before being arrested. For this, Matrai was sentenced to three months in jail. In 1972, he and his wife were each sentenced to three months in jail after being convicted of spraying a Mace-type substance in an auditorium where a Socialist group was holding a meeting. Matrai then attempted to seek asylum in the United States, where he got into contact with Alpha 66, an anti-Castro terrorist organization. The asylum request was rejected and Matrai was ordered to leave the country in July 1973.

EBS members joined the small Ontario Social Credit Party in the early 1970s and took it over by 1972. The Social Credit Party of Canada expelled them resulting in two rival Ontario Social Credit parties existing for several years. In 1971, three of five Ontario Social Credit candidates in the 1971 provincial election were identified as EBS members. After Don Andrews took over the group in 1972, he transformed it into the Western Guard, a more explicitly white supremacist and antisemitic group.

The EBS was named after the 18th century British member of Parliament and conservative political philosopher Edmund Burke.

== See also ==
- John Birch Society
