= Willem Schippers =

Dutch factory worker and writer

- Willem Schippers
- Born: 4 April 1867; Groote Lindt, Netherlands
- Died: 11 June 1954 (aged 87); Dordrecht, Netherlands
- Occupations: author, metalworker
- Writing career
- Genres: Youth books, family novels

Willem Schippers (April 4, 1867 - Dordrecht, June 11, 1954) was a Dutch factory worker and writer who published over 45 Christian children's books and family novels during his lifetime.

== Biography ==
Schippers was born in Groote Lindt in Zwijndrecht, the youngest son of a mailman. He worked initially as a blacksmith's boy in a forge in a village on the river Maas. Schippers then worked for five years in a machine factory, then later in a large factory in Dordrecht, as a metal turner.

In the evening after work, Schippers would write the stories he imagined during the work day. He gained inspiration from his surroundings and the people around him. Schippers found that writing helped him rest after the heavy work.

Schippers wrote his first book (title unknown) at age 33. In 1907, he published The Poacher and other titles.

Schippers died in 1954. In 1998, De Groot Goudriaan published a biography entitled "Willem Schippers (1867-1954): a life between pen and smith's hammer". In 2009, many of Schippers's books were reprinted by De Ramshoorn publishers in Goes. Cover and interior illustrations were created by Rino Visser.

== Bibliography ==
- The Poacher (his 2nd book) (1st ed. 1907)
- The Foundling (1908)
- The Owl's Nest (1909)(Het Uilennest. ISBN 978-9076466811)
- The son of skipper Holting (1910)
- Vreewald's mill (1911)
- A sailor's wife (1914)
- Wuildershoeve (1916)
- Vaders jongen (also in German) (1919)
- The foster son of the tinker (1920)
- Better than gold (1921)
- Jan Starheim (1921)
- On the cobbles (1921)
- The Bat (1922)
- Eiberslust (1923)
- The street musician (The wages of sin) (1923)
- The Ferry House and the Rose Donation (1924)
- The half brothers (1925)
- The forester of Oldeborn (1926)
- Four-leaf clover (1928)
- Eye for an eye (1928)
- The Fisherman of Nispenrode (1929)
- Donar (1930)
- Two roads, one goal (1930)
- The Locksmith (1931)
- Hermien (1931)
- In storm and flood (1932)
- The voice of blood (1933)
- The Brothers in arms (1933)
- The Creeper (1933)
- Strumpelkenshoef (1934)
- The Tramp (1936)
- Faithful to prove (1936)
- Bouke Bijlertsma or families on troubled roads (1936)
- The Short-eared Owl (1937)
- The Rebel (1938)
- The player and his family (Profit by loss) (1938)
- The volunteer of 1830 (1939)
- Agge the fowler (1939)
- Men of the Sea (1939)
- The boys of the bittern (1940)
- Om de Hornkamp (1940)
- Het hofje van Gerbrandus (1942)
- Frans Wikkers (1942)
- The Cornflower or father's pride and discontent (1946)
- The new field guard (1947)
- The cook of the Simpang (1951)
- Memories (1956)
