= Wolfgang Droege =

Canadian white supremacist (1949–2005)

- Born: Wolfgang Walter Droege; 25 September 1949; Forchheim, West Germany
- Died: 13 April 2005 (aged 55); Scarborough, Ontario, Canada
- Cause of death: Gunshot wounds
- Known for: Co-founder of the Heritage Front

Wolfgang Walter Droege (or Dröge) (25 September 1949 – 13 April 2005) was a German-born Canadian white supremacist, neo-Nazi and founding leader of the Heritage Front. He was killed during a bungled drug deal in 2005.

== Biography ==
=== Early life ===
Droege was born in Forchheim, Germany. His parents and grandparents had been enthusiastic supporters of the Nazi Party, and Julius Streicher was a friend of the family. Droege and his mother moved to Canada in 1962. In 1967, he moved back to Germany to join the military but was rejected for health reasons, so he returned to Canada and became a Canadian citizen in the early 1970s.

=== 1970s ===
Droege became interested in far-right politics. He joined an extremist group, the Western Guard, in 1974 at the prompting of Don Andrews and later joined Andrews's Nationalist Party of Canada. He was arrested, charged, and convicted of damage to property and mischief in 1975 after spraying "white power" slogans along the route of the African Liberation Day march in Toronto. In December 1976, he joined the Ku Klux Klan, then led by David Duke, after attending the "International Patriotic Congress" in New Orleans organized by Duke. Droege was second in command to Canadian Imperial Wizard James Alexander McQuirter and the pair attempted to start a KKK branch in Toronto. He also organized for the Klan in British Columbia where he spread Duke's "one law for all" and "equal rights for everyone" slogans.

=== 1980s ===
In 1981, Droege helped organize a failed attempt, codenamed "Operation Red Dog", to invade Dominica, overthrow its government, and restore deposed Prime Minister Patrick John to power. According to testimony presented at the trial of Droege and his nine co-conspirators, in exchange for restoring John to power, Droege would have been permitted to use the island as the centre of a drug-refinement and trafficking operation.

The attempted coup went awry after a CFTR radio reporter who had been approached about an "exclusive story" decided to contact the police. Droege was sentenced to a three-year prison sentence for his mercenary activities. As it was launched from New Orleans, this event was derided as the "Bayou of Pigs" fiasco by critics such as Don Andrews.

A book about the plot, by Canadian journalist Stewart Bell, was published in August 2008.

In 1985, he was arrested in Alabama as an illegal alien and charged with cocaine possession, as well as possession of an illegal knife. He served four years of a 13-year sentence. Upon his release from jail in 1989, Droege went to Libya to attend a congress of what became the International Third Position and then returned to Canada to found the Heritage Front.

=== 1990s ===
In 1992, Droege's connections with racist organizations led to his expulsion from the Reform Party of Canada—Droege and a number of others from this community were trying to enter the Reform Party when it expanded in Ontario, and to take advantage of the party's inexperience. Later, in the 1993 Federal Election, Droege and other Heritage Front members made a point of being seen outside of Reform Party events in the city of Toronto. In 1993, following an attack with ARA members in retaliation for their attack on the house of Gary Schipper, the Heritage Front's spokesman, Droege was charged and convicted of aggravated assault and possession of dangerous weapons, and he served two months of a three-month sentence. Following his release from prison, Droege drifted away from organized racial activities and worked for a time as a bailiff with a longtime acquaintance, Al Overfield. After losing his job, he returned to cigarette and drug trafficking as well as auto theft.

Droege ran for Scarborough city council in the 1994 municipal elections, receiving 802 votes in a two-person contest. In 1998, he pleaded guilty to possession of a stolen car.

=== 2000s ===
Droege's fifty-fifth birthday party was held at Jack Astor's restaurant in Etobicoke, Ontario, just weeks after the same restaurant had been the site of a confrontation between Anti-Racist Action and supporters of Ernst Zündel.

Droege was found shot to death on 13 April 2005 in the hallway of his lowrise apartment in Scarborough, Ontario, outside of his door. The gunman, Keith Deroux, had approached him to purchase cocaine. Deroux shot Droege in the throat, and panicked before shooting him in the head. On 16 June 2006, Deroux pleaded guilty to manslaughter and was sentenced to ten years in prison. According to an agreed statement of facts read out in court, Deroux was an alcoholic with paranoid delusions.

== Associates ==
- George Burdi
- Marc Lemire
- Paul Fromm
- Al Overfield
- Elisa Hategan (later defected and testified against Droege)

== See also ==
- Ku Klux Klan in Canada
- Neo-Nazism in Canada
