= Western Guard Party =

White supremacist organization in Canada

- Leader: Don Andrews (1972–1976); John Ross Taylor (from 1976)
- Founded: 1972
- Dissolved: c. 1980s
- Preceded by: Edmund Burke Society
- Headquarters: Toronto, Ontario
- Ideology: White supremacy; Anti-communism
- Political position: Far-right
- Magazine: Straight Talk

Party flag

The Western Guard Party, founded in 1972 as the Western Guard, was a white supremacist group based in Toronto, Ontario, Canada. It evolved out of the far-right anti-communist Edmund Burke Society that had been founded in 1967 by Don Andrews, Paul Fromm, Leigh Smith and Al Overfield.

In 1971, the EBS had taken over Social Credit Party of Ontario. Fromm was elected as party president and EBS installed members to the party's executive. However, in 1972, the Social Credit Party of Canada declared Western Guard membership incompatible with Social Credit and expelled the group.

Andrews became the dominant figure in the EBS, and relaunched it as the Western Guard, narrowing the group's focus to racism, antisemitism and white supremacy. Fromm left the group later in 1972 as the Western Guard descended into violent activity.

In 1975, Andrews was charged with offences ranging from plotting arson, possession of weapons and explosives, and mischief, and was sentenced to two years in jail. Although Western Guard did plot to bomb a visiting Israeli soccer team, Don Andrews was not convicted of this crime. In order to fulfill his bail conditions, Andrews separated himself from the Western Guard. Veteran fascist John Ross Taylor became the group's leader in 1976. Taylor changed the name of the group to Western Guard Party. The group's membership declined under his idiosyncratic leadership. Many members, including Wolfgang Droege, left to join the Nationalist Party of Canada which had been founded by Andrews when he was released from prison in 1978.

In 1979, Taylor was charged with hate speech for the Western Guard's telephonic messages and was brought before the Canadian Human Rights Commission. He was ultimately imprisoned for contempt of court when he continued the Guard's racist answering machine messages. The group became an essentially one-person party in the 1980s, and was defunct by the middle of the decade.

Despite calling itself a party, the Western Guard never registered as a federal or provincial political party and is not known to have ever nominated candidates for office under its name.

== In popular culture ==
- Bruce Cockburn's "Free to Be" refers to the Western Guard Party: "On the skid row of the spirit / Hear the ranting of the Western Guard". Cockburn cites them as the inspiration for writing the song.

== See also ==
- Fascism in Canada
- James Alexander McQuirter
- List of white nationalist organizations
