= William John Beattie =

Canadian white supremacist

William John Beattie (known as John Beattie; born 1941 or 1942; died on or about April 4, 2025) was a Canadian Neo-Nazi who was the founder and former leader of the Canadian Nazi Party. The establishment of the Canadian Nazi Party, re-named the National Socialist Party in 1967, marked a re-emergence of organized neo-Nazi activity in Canada that had been dormant since the days of Adrian Arcand.

== The Canadian Nazi Party leader ==
Beattie organized a number of rallies in Toronto in the mid-1960s, although few actual Canadian Nazi Party members attended, and none of the rallies resulted in much support for Beattie's cause. One of these rallies on May 30, 1965, resulted in a violent encounter with Jewish activists who disrupted Beattie's rally at Allan Gardens. Beattie later found himself in legal trouble as a result of his rallies, and an exposé article was written in Canadian newsmagazine Maclean's by private investigator John Garrity, who had been hired by the Canadian Jewish Congress to infiltrate Beattie's movement. As a result of a daubing swastikas on the gateposts of prominent Jewish leaders in Toronto, Beattie was sent to prison for six months having been convicted of public mischief. In a 1966 Playboy Magazine interview, American Nazi Party founder George Lincoln Rockwell referred to Beattie as leading, "a tremendous and successful movement" in Canada.

After changing the group's name to the National Socialist Party, Beattie created a recorded telephone message line. Among the messages recorded was one that claimed, "that blacks were being manipulated by Jew-communists."

== Activities after the Canadian Nazi Party ==
Beattie disbanded the National Socialist Party in 1978. Soon after he and John Ross Taylor co-founded the short-lived British People's League. In both 1988 and 1989, Beattie organized "Aryan Fest" parties on his property in Minden, Ontario.

== Ernst Zündel's Canadian Human Rights Tribunal hearing ==
Beattie was to be a key witness for Paul Fromm during the Canadian Human Rights Tribunal concerning Holocaust denier Ernst Zündel in 2000. Fromm's organization, the Canadian Association for Free Expression, had intervenor status during the hearings. Fromm claimed that Beattie would testify that the Canadian Nazi Party had been a front created by the Canadian Jewish Congress as a means to enact Section 319 of the Criminal Code:

"Beattie will reveal that he was a dupe and a patsy, that everything from his group's name to its major activities was suggested or quarterbacked by persons acting as agents for or reporting to the Canadian Jewish Congress. Uncannily, at the very time that the Canadian Nazi Party was being built up and just as quickly destroyed a government committee was holding hearings to propose anti-hate legislation. The Cohen Committee made significant mention of the threat posed by John Beattie. The Canadian Jewish Congress, which largely created the short-lived Canadian Nazi Party, had, since the 1930s been lobbying for restrictions on freedom of speech.

"Beattie will reveal how an agent for the Canadian Jewish Congress lured him into a technical breach of the law, which landed the now unemployed, penniless Nazi leader in prison for six months. Beattie will also expose the fact that the same agent proposed legal maneuvers [sic] that were calculated to frighten and cause distress among Jews, thus heightening the "Nazi" menace, which was used as the argument for the 1971 "hate law" (Section 319 of the Criminal Code) and the subsequent section 13.1 (telephonic communication of hate) of the Canadian Human Rights Act, where truth is no defence."

When it came time for his testimony however, Beattie was unavailable. Although Fromm later claimed that Beattie's absence was as a result of a scheduling conflict, it appears that Beattie was upset by the wording of the press release that referred to him as a "dupe" and "patsy."

== Later life and death ==
Beattie ran for deputy reeve of Minden in 2014. In a 2026 post, anti-racist blogger Kurt Phillips wrote that Beattie had Parkinson's disease and that his last video for the British People's League was uploaded to YouTube on November 4, 2024.

== See also ==
- Neo-Nazism in Canada
