= Gary Schipper =

Canadian white supremacist

Gary Schipper (born 1952) is a white supremacist and was a prominent member of the Canadian neo-Nazi Heritage Front which disbanded around 2005. He is best known for having been the Heritage Front's public voice in the early 1990s, acting as its spokesman in interviews and recording messages for telephonic broadcast on the group's controversial telephone hotline.

== Biography ==
The telephone messages resulted in the Heritage Front being brought before the Canadian Human Rights Tribunal for communicating racial hate messages. Schipper defended the messages saying "Our hot line is not illegal, [t]he hot line's a romper room, it's politically incorrect. If you want a little humour, a little satire, call the hot line."

His high profile as a proponent of racism in the early 1990s culminated in a June 1993 demonstration outside his house by 175 supporters of Anti-Racist Action in which rocks and paint were thrown at Schipper's residence breaking windows and causing property damage. The demonstration assembled in a downtown park and was expected by white supremacists to be heading to the house of Ernst Zündel who had gathered at the Carlton Street property and were surprised to learn later of the protest's true destination. Heritage Front leader Wolfgang Droege was "enraged" by the attack and reportedly vowed revenge saying "From now on, if that's the way they want to play the game, that's fine." The same evening, approximately 30 to 40 Heritage Front members attacked Anti-Racist Action supporters at Sneaky Dee's bar, a popular hang-out for anti-racists. According to a bar employee, the white supremacists "stomped all over people" and "They just went crazy. They wanted to kill anybody. There were riot cops everywhere and a lot of glass flying around. Cops were tackling guys all over the place." Front leader Droege and leading members Peter Mitrevski and Christopher Newhook was criminally charged with aggravated assault and weapons offences as a result of the melee.

The legal problems and jail sentences stemming from the aftermath of the attack on Schipper's house as well as from the hotline's operation were a leading factor in the Front's decline after 1993 and the decline in Droege's involvement. In June 1994, Schipper was sentenced for two months imprisonment (Droege and Kenneth Barker were also sentenced) for contempt of court for disregarding a court order to cease the telephone hate messages. Also, in 1994, the five anti-racists charged for attacking Schipper's house were acquitted.

In 2015, Schipper, using the pseudonym Johnny Jensen (or J. J.), worked as a country musician and wrote for a Toronto neo-Nazi publication, Your Ward News.
