= Canadian Nazi Party =

- Leader: William John Beattie
- Founded: 1965
- Dissolved: 1978
- Headquarters: Toronto, Ontario
- Ideology: Neo-Nazism; White supremacy
- Political position: Far-right
- International affiliation: World Union of National Socialists

The Canadian National Socialist Party, commonly known as the Canadian Nazi Party, existed from 1965 to 1978. It was led by William John Beattie, and was based in Toronto. It succeeded a separate, short-lived group also known as the Canadian Nazi Party that was led by André Bellefeuille and based in Quebec. It was affiliated with the World Union of National Socialists.

According to John Garrity, a spy who infiltrated the party, its recruitment was supported by the American Nazi Party's leader, George Lincoln Rockwell. He stated that Rockwell had sent the Canadian Nazi Party a list of almost three hundred Ontario residents that had contacted the American Nazi Party.

The party's rallies in Toronto have been described as "infamous". One such rally in 1966 drew a counter-protest of about 1,500 people.
