= Ku Klux Klan in Canada =

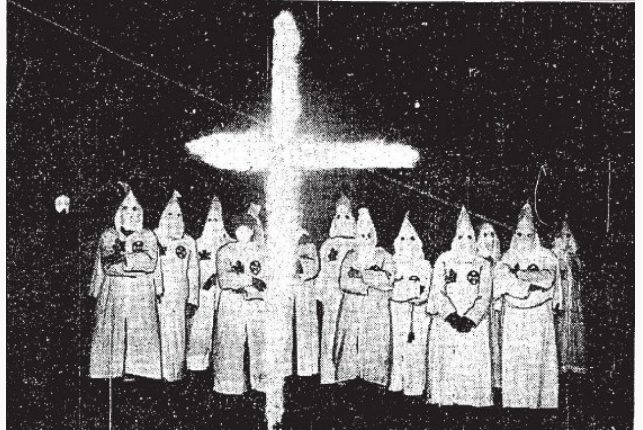
A Klan cross-burning ceremony in London, Ontario, in late 1925

The Canadian branch of the Ku Klux Klan was an expansion of the second Ku Klux Klan established in the United States in 1915. It operated as a fraternity, with chapters established in parts of Canada throughout the 1920s and early 1930s. The first registered provincial chapter was registered in Toronto in 1925 by two Americans and a Canadian. The organization was most successful in Saskatchewan, where it briefly influenced political activity and where its membership included a member of Parliament, Walter Davy Cowan.

== Background ==
The conclusion of the American Civil War in 1865 resulted in the termination of the secessionist movement of the Confederate States of America and the abolition of slavery. The United States entered a period of Reconstruction, during which the infrastructure destroyed during the civil war would be rebuilt, national unity would be restored, and freed slaves were guaranteed their civil rights with the passage of the Reconstruction Amendments.

In December 1865, six veterans of the Confederate Army established the Ku Klux Klan in Pulaski, Tennessee.

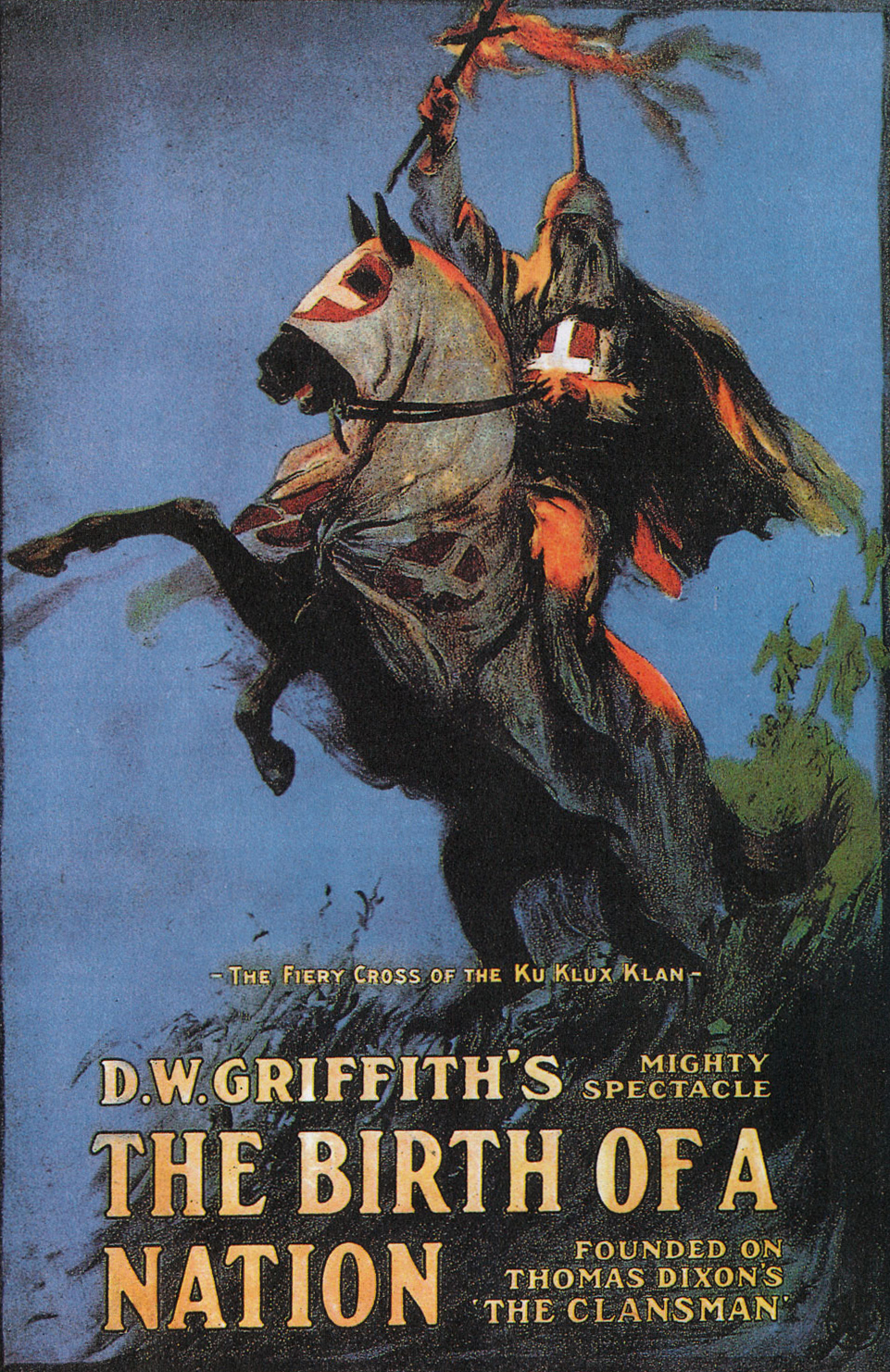
The silent film The Birth of a Nation, glorifying the original Ku Klux Klan, sparked the founding of the second Ku Klux Klan in the United States in 1915. This organization eventually led to the establishment of the Ku Klux Klan in Canada in the 1920s.

Presidents Abraham Lincoln (1861–1865) and Andrew Johnson (1865–1869) undertook a moderate approach to Reconstruction, but after the 1866 election resulted in the Radical Republicans controlling the policy of the 40th United States Congress, a harsher approach was adopted in which former Confederates were removed from power and freedmen were enfranchised. In July 1868, Congress passed the Fourteenth Amendment to the United States Constitution, addressing citizenship rights and granting equal protection under the law.

The 1868 presidential election victory by Ulysses S. Grant, who supported Radical Republicans, further entrenched this approach. Under his presidency, the Fifteenth Amendment to the constitution was passed, prohibiting federal and state governments from denying a citizen the right to vote based on that citizen's "race, color, or previous condition of servitude". This was followed by three Enforcement Acts, criminal codes protecting African Americans and primarily targeting the Ku Klux Klan. It was the third act, also known as the "Ku Klux Klan Act", which resulted in the termination of the Ku Klux Klan by 1872 and prosecution of hundreds of Klan members.

The release of the film The Birth of a Nation by D. W. Griffith in 1915, glorifying the original Ku Klux Klan using historical revisionism, stoked resentment among some citizens and riots in cities where it screened. The day before Thanksgiving in 1915, William Joseph Simmons and 15 of his friends established the second Ku Klux Klan atop Stone Mountain in Georgia, ceremonially burning a cross to mark the occasion.

== Expansion into Canada ==
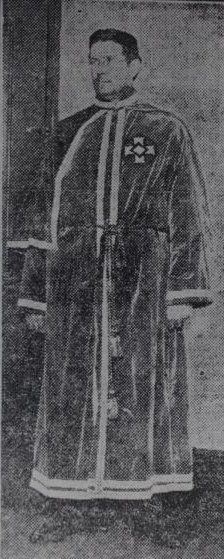
J.H. Hawkins, one of the original founders of the Ku Klux Klan of Canada

In March 1922, an African American man named Matthew Bullock fled North Carolina after the Ku Klux Klan had stated he was a wanted man, accusing him of inciting riots. His brother had been killed by Klansmen, who the Toronto Star reported at the time had "threatened to send robed riders to fetch Bullock and whisk him back to the American south".

On 1 December 1924, C. Lewis Fowler of New York City, John H. Hawkins of Newport, Virginia, and Richard L. Cowan of Toronto signed an agreement to establish the Knights of Ku Klux Klan of Canada. Funding responsibilities for the provincial organization were split equally among them, and each was a founding Imperial officer of the Provincial Kloncilium, the governing body of the organization. Fowler travelled to Canada on 1 January 1925 to officially establish the organization. Cowan was the Imperial Wizard (president), Hawkins the Imperial Klaliff (vice-president) and Chief of Staff, and Fowler the Imperial Kligrapp (secretary). They also split the organization's income equally. Fowler left Canada in 1926.

During the mid 1920s, Ku Klux Klan branches were established throughout Canada. According to historian James Pitsula, these groups observed the same racial ideology but had a narrower focus than those in the United States, primarily to preserve the "Britishness" of Canada with respect to ethnicity and religious affiliation. The Ku Klux Klan of Canada made efforts to distinguish itself from the American organization, which used a "spectacular level of violent criminality" against black Americans and the white Americans who supported them. Hawkins stated at a rally in London that the Canadian Ku Klux Klan was not lawless, that it abided by the laws of the nation, but that it would promote changing those laws it didn't support or did "not meet the needs of the country". A 1925 photograph of garbed Canadian Klansmen published by the London Advertiser demonstrated that the Klan robes in Canada differed from those in the United States by including a maple leaf opposite the cross insignia.

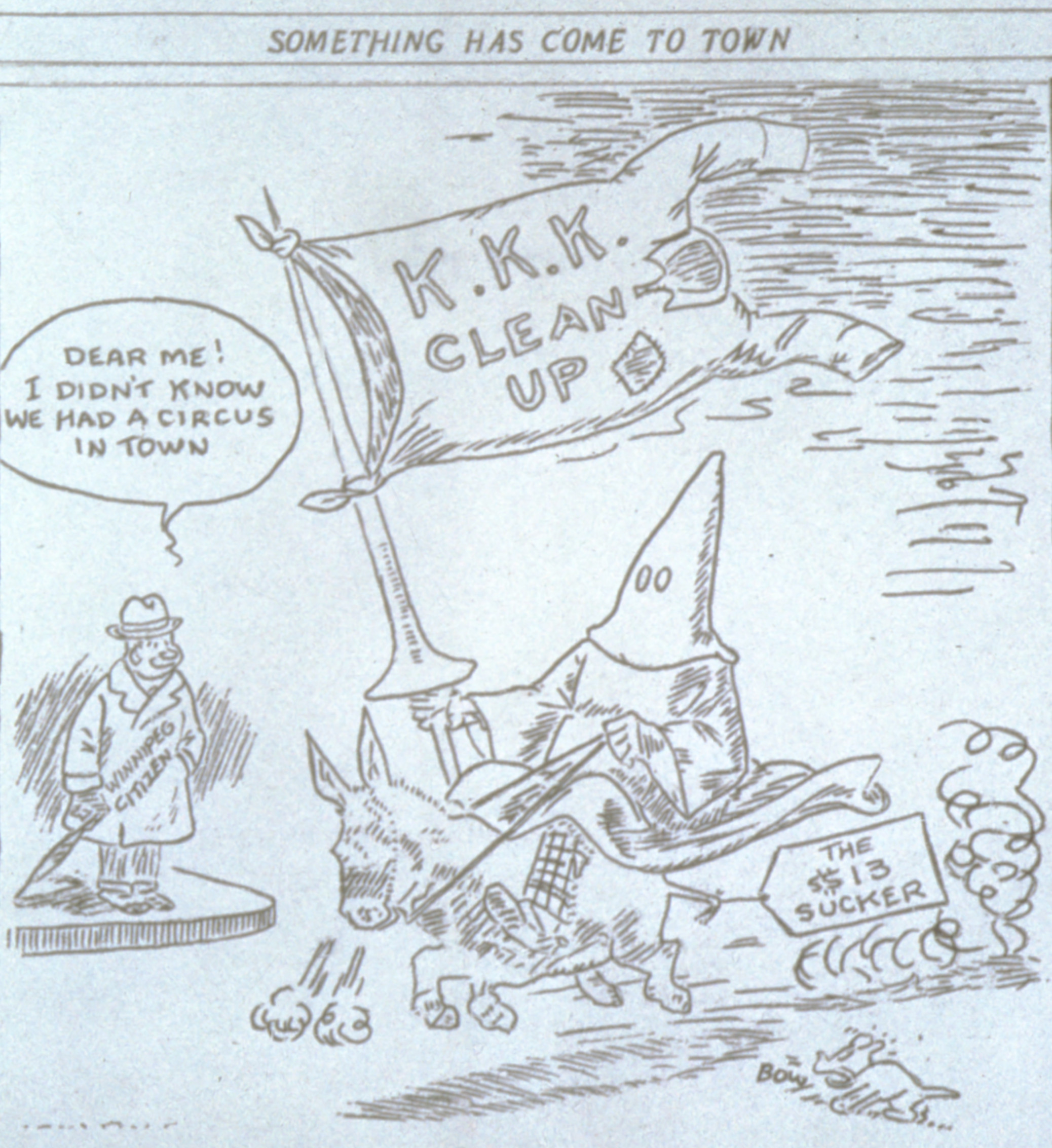
A political cartoon published by the Manitoba Free Press on 25 October 1928. Attempts by the Ku Klux Klan to expand into Manitoba were not successful.

One of the most prominent groups was the Ku Klux Klan of Kanada, whose main principles of white supremacy and nationalism required members to pledge that they were white, gentile, and Protestant. Organizers stated that the Ku Klux Klan was a Christian organization with "first allegiance to Canada and the Union Jack", disqualifying Jews from membership because they are not Christian, and Roman Catholics because of the Anti-Catholic belief that Catholics first allegiance is to the Pope.

Although the KKK operated throughout Canada, it was most successful in Saskatchewan, where by the late 1920s its membership was over 25,000. Historian Allan Bartley states that this success was a result of opposition to liberal Government of Saskatchewan policy established by the entrenched Saskatchewan Liberal Party, which had held power in the province since its inception in 1905.

In 1991, Carney Nerland, a professed white supremacist, member of the Ku Klux Klan and leader of the Saskatchewan branch of the Church of Jesus Christ–Christian Aryan Nation killed a Cree man, Leo LaChance, with an assault rifle. LaChance had entered Nerland's Prince Albert, Saskatchewan pawn shop to sell furs he had trapped. Nerland served three years of a four-year sentence for manslaughter.

== Operations ==
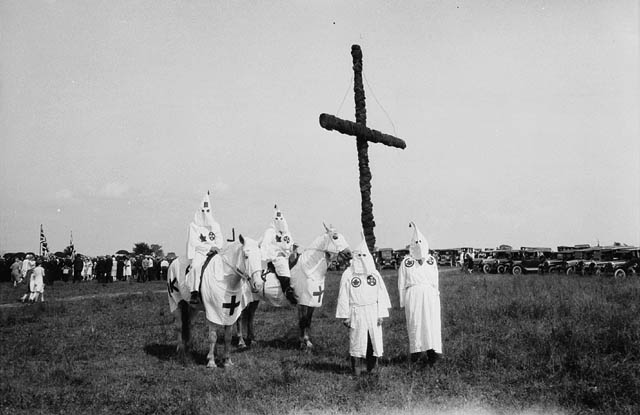
Ku Klux Klan members, on foot and horseback, by a cross erected in a field near Kingston, Ontario in 1927

Although distancing itself from the violence perpetrated by the Ku Klux Klan in the United States, the Ku Klux Klan in Canada was engaged in various campaigns threatening those who didn't conform to the Klan's beliefs. It resulted in significant property damage throughout Canada. Although there is little proof, the Klan was blamed for the razing of Saint-Boniface College in Saint Boniface, Winnipeg, which resulted in 10 deaths, destruction of the building, and loss of all of its records and its library.

Before the official establishment of the Ku Klux Klan in Canada, Catholic churches and property throughout Canada were targets of arson, notably the Cathedral-Basilica of Notre-Dame de Québec in Quebec City in 1922. These were attributed to the Ku Klux Klan.

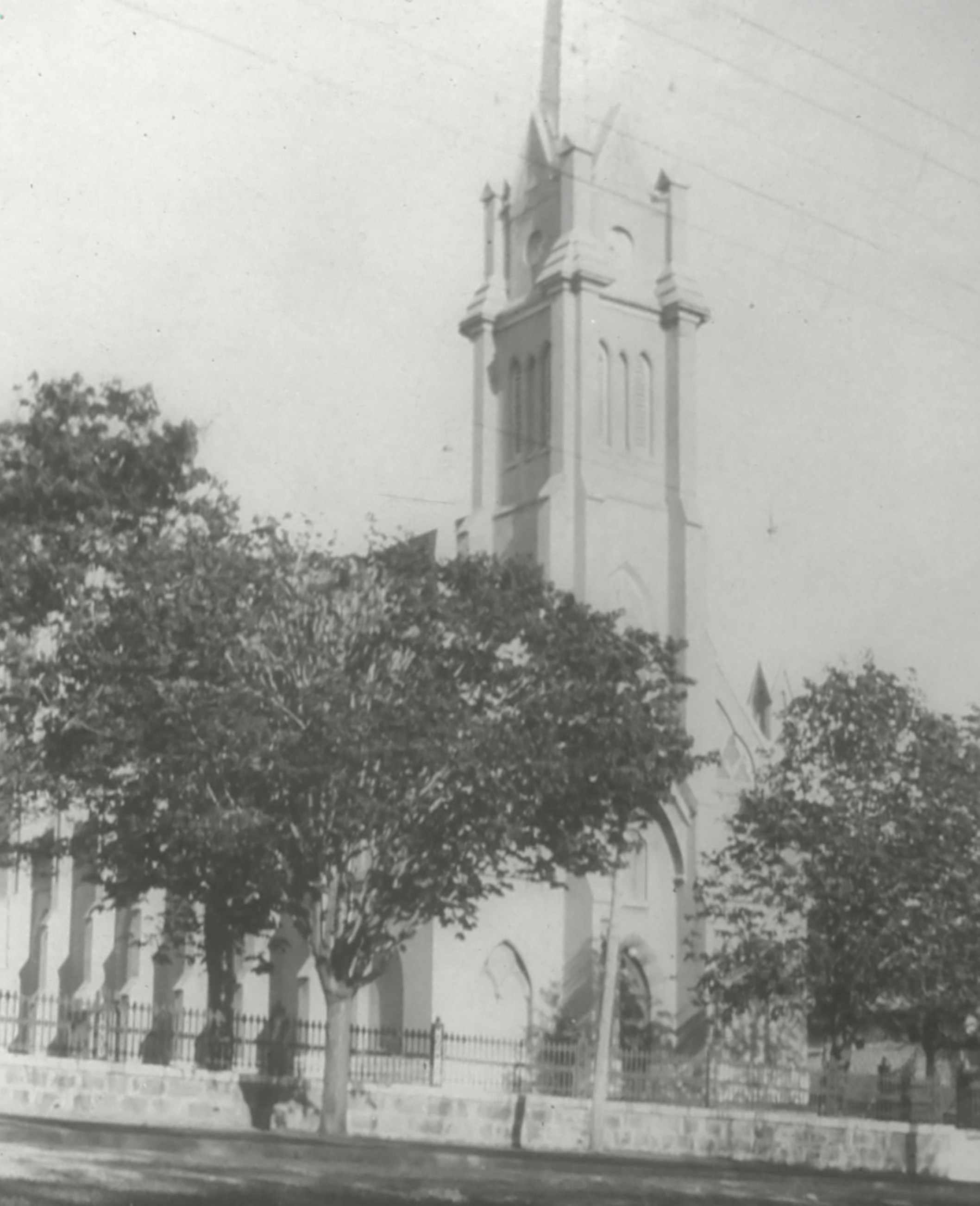
St. Mary's Roman Catholic Church in Barrie, Ontario

Other violent acts associated with the Klan include the 1926 detonation of dynamite at St. Mary's Roman Catholic Church in Barrie. The man who placed the dynamite in the church's furnace room was later caught, and admitted that he did so on orders from the Ku Klux Klan. The Ontario media, politicians and other civic authorities, and religious leaders spoke out against such violence and against the Klan. By the winter of 1926, Klan membership in Ontario was declining.

=== Westward expansion ===
In 1926, American Ku Klux Klan organizers Hugh Finlay Emmons and Lewis A. Scott from Indiana established a Klan organization in Saskatchewan. They spent most of early 1927 travelling throughout the province, establishing local Klan branches and selling memberships for CA$13 per individual. They also spread Klan propaganda and burned crosses, and in July and August 1927 they made another tour of the province.

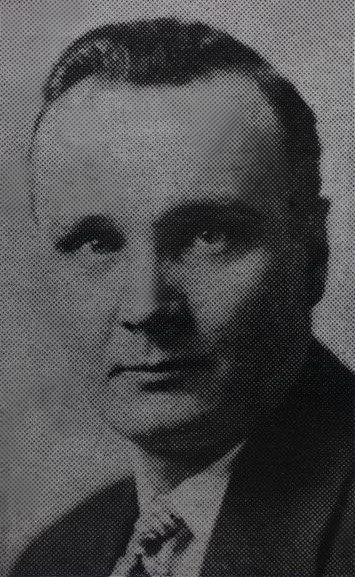
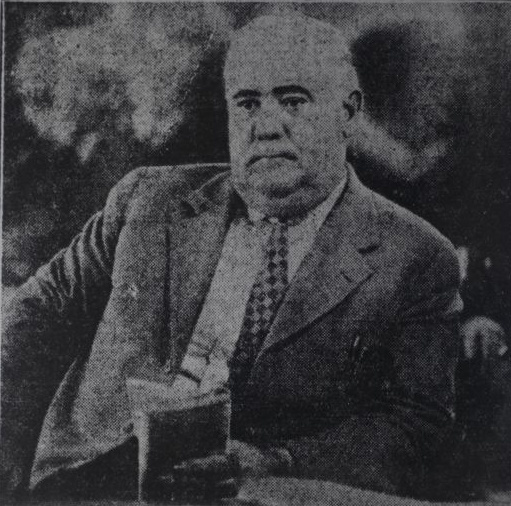
John James Maloney (left) worked to revive the Ku Klux Klan in Saskatchewan after Hugh Finlay "Pat" Emmons (right) and Lewis A. Scott fled the province with the organization's money.

Soon after, they fled Saskatchewan with the funds they had raised, leaving the Ku Klux Klan floundering. Hawkins and John James Maloney, a seminarian from Hamilton who denounced Romanism, moved to Saskatchewan to revive the organization. Under his leadership, the organization raised over CA$50,000 in membership fees and claimed to have registered over 70,000 members. Fees were set at $15 per member annually. Many of its members were supporters of the Conservative Party of Saskatchewan frustrated with the success of the Liberal Party as a result of strong support from Catholics.

All our troubles, all the sedition, plotting and plans against the national school system are hatched in Quebec.

— Reverend S. P. Rondeau, 10 January 1929

Under the leadership of Hawkins and Maloney, the Klan became increasingly anti-Catholic and anti-French, and campaigned against the separate school system with the slogan "one nation, one flag, one language, one school". They opposed "crucifixes on public school walls, nuns teaching in public schools, and the teaching of French in public schools", blaming these issues on Quebec. (The Constitution Act, 1867 guaranteed provincial rights to education and language, protecting minority rights, including those of Catholics and French-speaking citizens.) At a meeting of the Ku Klux Klan on 10 January 1929 at the Regent Hall in Saskatoon, reverend S.P. Rondeau stated that Quebec was attempting to establish Saskatchewan as a second French-speaking province. Newly founded local chapters would announce their presence to the community with a ritual cross burning.

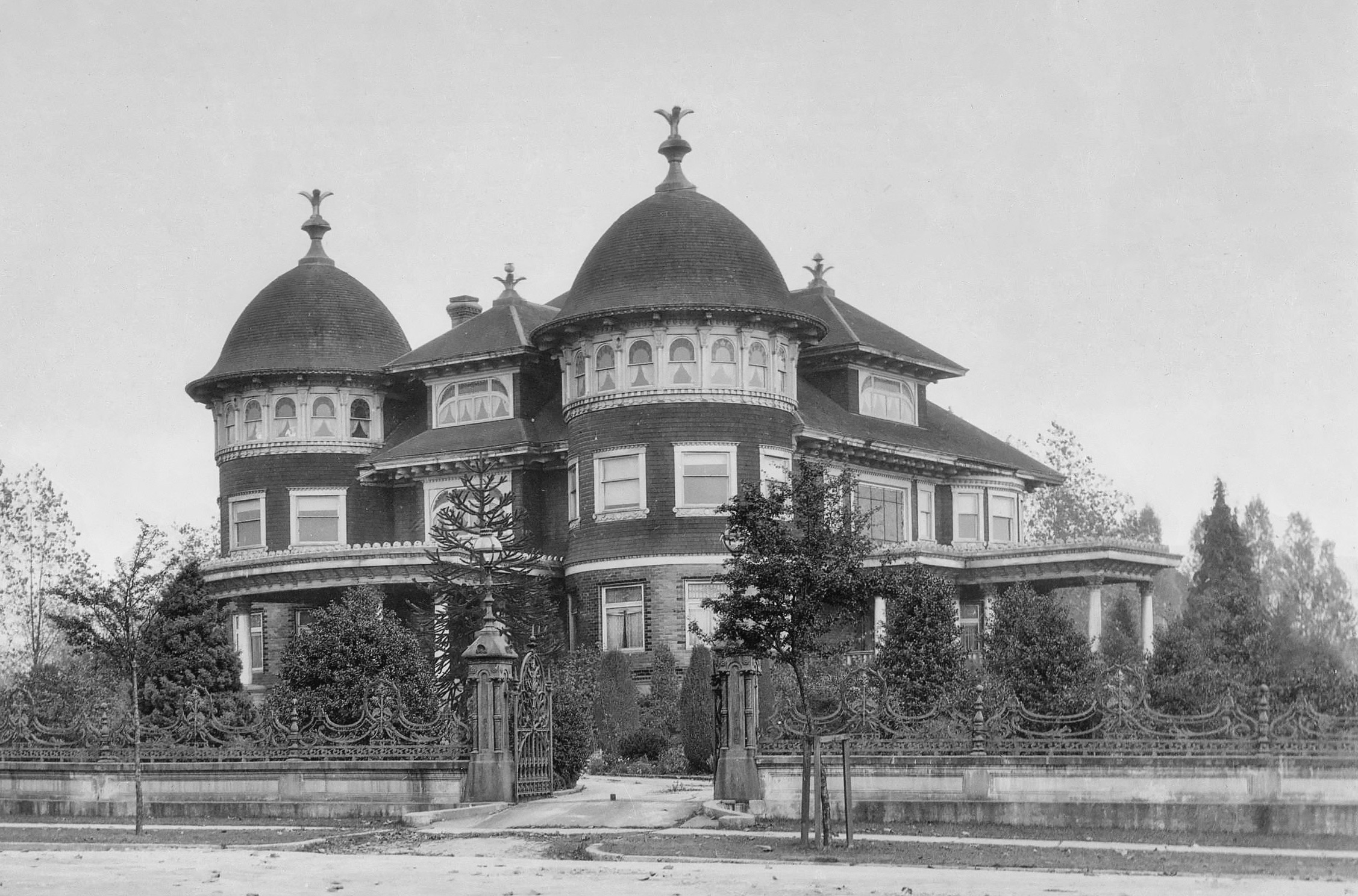
The Imperial Palace of the Kanadian Knights of Ku Klux Klan in British Columbia

This became an issue in the 1929 provincial election, ultimately resulting in a coalition government led by James Thomas Milton Anderson of the Conservatives after the Liberals failed to form a minority government. The Ku Klux Klan would appear at many election rallies for James Garfield Gardiner, burning crosses. Gardiner accused Anderson and the Conservatives of being associated with the Ku Klux Klan or seeking its support, but never provided proof. Klan membership included Conservatives, Liberals, and Progressives, and the provincial treasurer ("Klabee") was Walter Davy Cowan, Conservative Party of Canada Member of Parliament for Long Lake during the 17th Canadian Parliament from 1930 to 1935. Once they formed the government, the Conservatives condemned the Ku Klux Klan, but their opponents persisted in linking them to the organization until the 1934 provincial election. The Conservative government amended the School Act to ban the display of religious insignia in educational settings, and also amended the provincial immigration policy. The government also terminated recognition of teaching certificates granted by Quebec, effectively halting the recruitment of teachers from that province.

=== Alberta ===
Maloney married Leorna Miller, the daughter of William Willoughby Miller who was a Member of the Legislative Assembly for Biggar during the 7th Saskatchewan Legislature led by Anderson. In his book Rome in Canada he states that the Anderson government forgot him, and "in their pride and conceit" took credit for much of his effort. Bitter at the rejection, he made visits to Ontario then moved to Alberta in 1930, and spoke at 20 engagements that spring at the request of Orange Lodge Grand Master A.E. Williams. Finding competition against William Aberhart ("Bible Bill") in Calgary difficult, he moved to Edmonton, which he stated was the "Rome of the West" because of its many Roman Catholic properties.

He restored the Alberta Ku Klux Klan, which had been established in 1923 but was poorly organized and managed. He declared himself the Imperial Wizard, and sent for experienced Klan organizers from British Columbia and Saskatchewan. Travelling to as many as five engagements a day in rural areas to establish Klaverns and collect CA$13 membership fees, the Klan sometimes encountered strong opposition, requiring police protection at Gibbons and Stony Plain, facing a volley of thrown rocks at Chauvin, and prevented from disembarking a train at Wainwright. The Klan carried out the same activities in Alberta as in the rest or North America, although they were somewhat less overtly violent. For example, there was only one tarring and feathering reported in Lacombe during this era, to which the Klan denied involvement. As their main focus in Alberta was to marginalize Catholic, Jewish, and non-Anglo-Saxon white people, they led boycotts of Catholic businesses, targeted francophones with intimidation tactics, and influenced municipal elections to oust politicians they deemed to be "papist sympathizers."

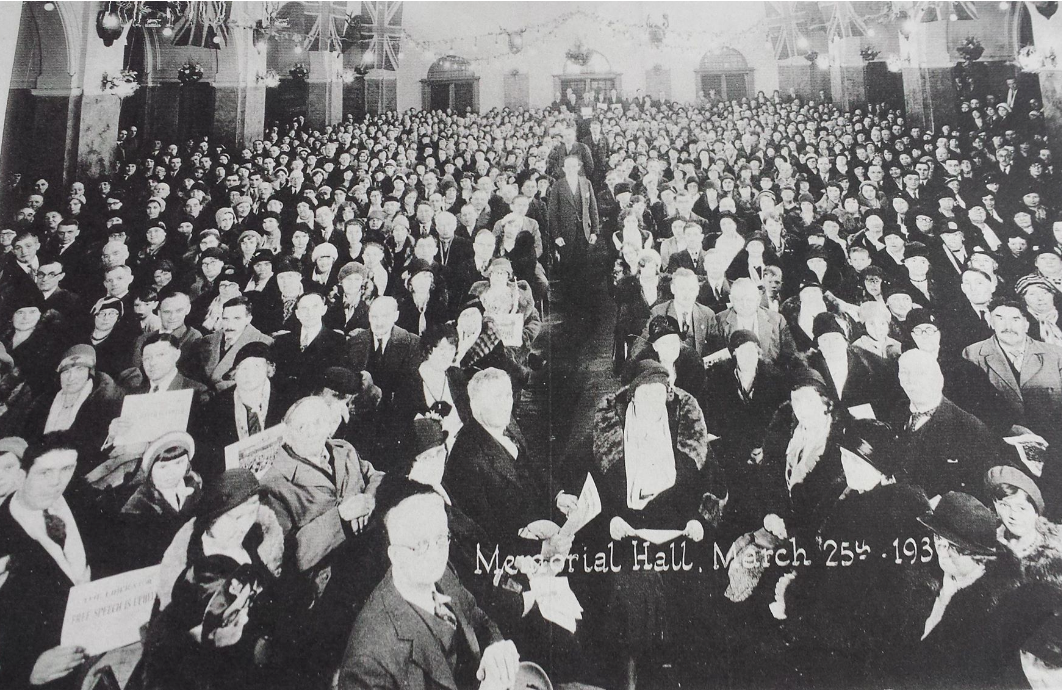
1932 Ku Klux Klan convention in Memorial Hall in Edmonton.

The Klan celebrated the 1930 election of Conservative MP Ambrose Bury by burning a cross on the edge of the river valley.

The Klan celebrated the 1931 election of Edmonton mayor Dan Knott by burning a cross. On three occasions, Knott granted the Klan permission to hold "picnics" and erect burning crosses on the Edmonton Exhibition grounds, now known as Northlands. The Klan published a newspaper The Liberator in downtown Edmonton during the early 1930s. Klan meetings were held in the Memorial Hall of the Royal Canadian Legion in Edmonton.

The Ku Klux Klan was incorporated as a society in September 1932, in Alberta, the only jurisdiction in the British Empire to give it that legal status. But questions arose about some of the organization's funds, and in early 1933 Maloney faced criminal charges. On 25 January 1933, he was found guilty of stealing legal documents from the office of Charles Grant, a lawyer who had opposed incorporation of the Ku Klux Klan, and on 3 February he was convicted of insurance fraud.

The downfall of Maloney was chiefly responsible for the discontinuation of the Ku Klux Klan in Alberta.

== Policy and propaganda ==
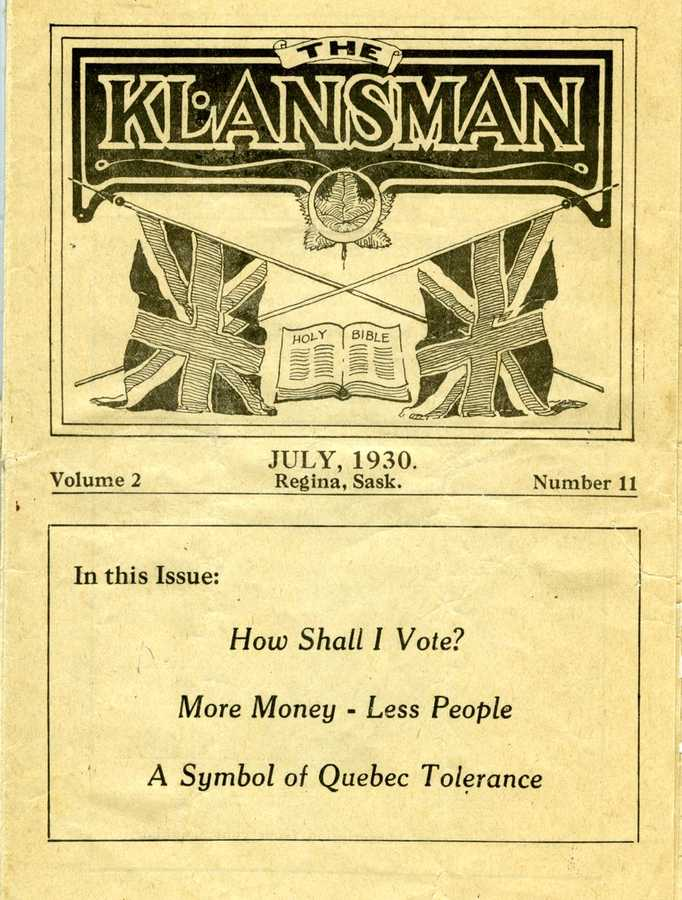
Cover of the July 1930 edition of The Klansman published in Saskatchewan by the provincial Knights of the Ku Klux Klan

In a letter to the Manitoba Free Press on 8 May 1928, J. W. E. Rosborough, the Imperial Wizard for Saskatchewan, stated that the creed of the Saskatchewan Ku Klux Klan was a belief in Protestantism, separation of church and state, one public school system, just laws and liberty, law and order, freedom from mob violence, freedom of speech and press, higher moral standards, gentile economic freedom, racial purity, restrictive and selective immigration, and pure patriotism. T.J. Hind, the reverend of First Baptist Church in Moose Jaw, stated that one of the purposes of the establishment of the Ku Klux Klan was for the protection of the physical purity of current and future generations.

Klansmen believed that Canada's immigration policy made it the dumping ground of the world. They falsely stated that of Regina's 8,000 recent immigrants, only 7 were Protestants. They promoted a "100 percent Canadian" policy to deter the declining influence of Protestant Anglo-Saxon Canadians as a result of increasing immigration from Europe, particularly Eastern Europe, which was primarily Roman Catholic and Jewish.

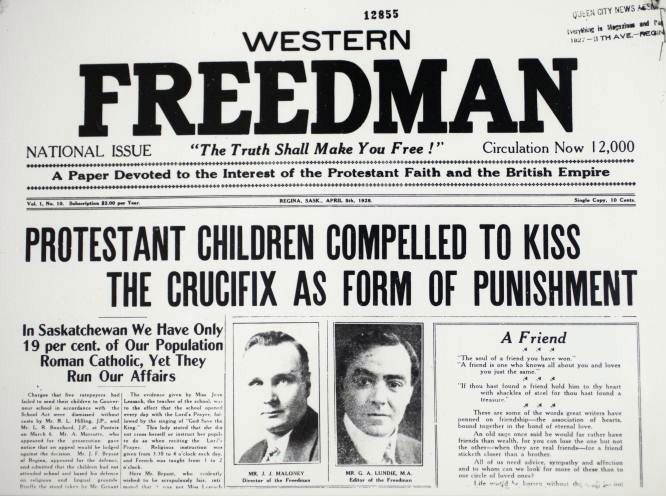
The 5 April 1928 issue of Western Freedman, a publication directed by J.J. Maloney, who was affiliated with the Knights of Ku Klux Klan

In October 1927 at a Ku Klux Klan meeting held at Regina City Hall, Maloney said he had received a letter from Plutarco Elías Calles, the President of Mexico, in which Calles stated that Mexico had an illiteracy rate of 80% as a result of the Roman Catholic Church's control of the educational system over the previous 400 years. (Calles was staunchly anti-clerical, and during his presidency hostility to Catholics and the enactment of the Calles Law resulted in the Cristero War.) Maloney described the Roman Catholic Church as "that dark system which has wrecked every country it got hold of", and campaigned to radically change Canada's immigration laws to restrict entry of Catholics. Klan organizers stated that the organization was pro-Protestant and did not discriminate based on political or religious affiliation, but was established to save Canada.

Klansmen stated that the organization did not receive fair treatment from the media, and that they were willing to establish their own news presses to disseminate facts about the organization.

== Membership ==
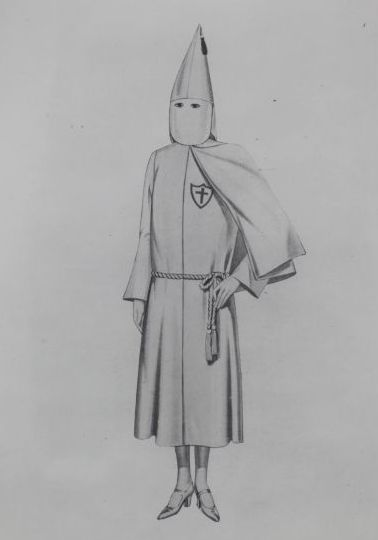
A Klanswomen's uniform as shown in a catalogue distributed in Saskatchewan during the 1920s and 1930s

In July 1927, a Klan organizer claimed that there were 46,500 members in Saskatchewan. By late 1927, there were 2,300 members of the Ku Klux Klan in Moose Jaw.

== Later activities ==
Allan Bartley notes that despite the decline of the Klan in Canada in the 1930s, a number of members turned to the emerging Nazi movement before it fell out of favour during World War II.

The Klan made a brief resurgence between the 1960s and 1980s, amidst the Civil Rights Movement in the United States and the adoption of official multiculturalism in Canada. Klan Imperial Wizard David Duke made recruitment attempts in Canada, with followers setting up a new Toronto chapter in 1981 led by James Alexander McQuirter. However, McQuirter and his followers were jailed for various criminal activities, leading to another decline in the Canadian Klan.

In the early 21st century, remnant members later moved to other supremacist groups and on to the Internet.

== See also ==
- Fascism in Canada
- Fascism in North America
- Ku Klux Klan titles and vocabulary
- James Alexander McQuirter
- List of fascist movements
- List of Ku Klux Klan organizations
- List of neo-Nazi organizations
- List of organizations designated by the Southern Poverty Law Center as hate groups
- List of white nationalist organizations
- Operation Red Dog
- Racism in North America
- Racism in the United States
