= Nationalist Party of Canada =

White supremacist organization in Canada

- Leader: Don Andrews
- Founded: 1977
- Split from: Western Guard
- Headquarters: 300 Coxwell Avenue; PO Box 3037; Toronto, Ontario; M4L 3B6
- Newspaper: The Nationalist Report (1977–1985)
- Membership (mid-1980s): 150–300
- Ideology: White supremacy
- Political position: Far-right

Party flag

Website
- natparty.com

The Nationalist Party of Canada is a Canadian white supremacist organization founded in 1977 by Don Andrews. It was initially known as the National Citizens Alliance and was established after Andrews was legally barred from associating with his previous organization, the Western Guard.

From 1977 to 1985, it published The Nationalist Report, a journal described by Canadian courts as promoting hatred against Black, Jewish, and Asian communities. Andrews and party secretary Robert Smith were convicted under Canada's hate speech laws for their work on the journal, and their appeal to the Supreme Court of Canada was rejected in the landmark decision of R v Andrews (1990).

== History ==
The Nationalist Party of Canada was founded by Andrews after he was legally barred by his bail conditions from associating with the Western Guard, another white supremacist organization. The party was briefly known as the National Citizens Alliance. It had an estimated 150 to 300 members in the mid-1980s.

From 1977 to 1985, the party published The Nationalist Report, which ceased publication when Andrews and party secretary Robert Smith were charged and convicted under the Criminal Code for promoting hatred. Crown attorney Michel Anne MacDonald described the journal as containing anti-Black, anti-Jewish and anti-Asian articles, and the presiding judge described the "degree of hatred" in their journal as "obscene". He added that Andrews was the "directing mind of the publication" and described Smith as a "faithful, industrious follower".

In 1986, Andrews and Smith endorsed Holocaust denier Jim Keegstra's bid to lead the Social Credit Party of Canada. The two men appealed to the Supreme Court of Canada in 1989, seeking to have their conviction overturned. The court rejected the appeal in December 1990, ruling that the Canadian Charter of Rights and Freedoms did not protect hate speech in R v Andrews and R v Keegstra. Andrews and Smith served jail terms following the ruling.

The Nationalist Party continues to further its goals through supporting such projects as "European Heritage Week" (commemorated every October beginning on the Canadian observance of Thanksgiving) and a shortwave radio program. It also originated and operates the "Canadian Flag Perpetual Pride Campaign" each year during the months of July and December, where residences in cities and towns in Canada, and governments at the federal, provincial and municipal levels are encouraged to properly display new Canadian flags and to replace worn ones; this campaign has been extended to encourage Canadian flag displays at offices and stores of major Canadian corporations such as Canadian Tire, Unilever and Loblaws/Weston.

Andrews has run for Mayor of Toronto several times, including in 2003 when he won 0.17 percent of the vote. In that year, two other party members ran unsuccessfully for Toronto City Council.

== Bob Smith ==
Robert "Bob" Wayne Smith is a frequent candidate for political office, and has sought election at the municipal, provincial and federal levels. Like Don Andrews, he was originally a member of the Western Guard Party. He first ran for the Toronto School Board in 1972, when he was still a student. His most recent campaign was for Mayor of Toronto in 2006. During his Western Guard days, he was the voice for its White Power Phone Message. Among organizations he has served in include the Canadian Anti-Soviet Action Committee, the Ontario Social Credit organization, as a director of the Ezra Pound Institute for International Studies, and as a guest commentator during the 1990s for the British Peoples' League Hour radio program. Today, he regularly blogs at his Internet column on the Nationalist Party website page, "Bob's Beat".

Electoral record (Note: The 1972 results are taken from the Globe and Mail newspaper, December 5, 1972, with 118 of 121 polls reporting. The 1974 results are taken from the Toronto Star newspaper, December 3, 1974, with 93 of 95 polls reporting. The 1976 results are taken from the Toronto Star newspaper, December 7, 1976. The 1980 results are taken from the Toronto Star newspaper, November 11, 1980. The 1982 results are taken from the Toronto Star newspaper, November 9, 1982. The 1985 results are taken from the Globe and Mail newspaper, November 14, 1985. The 2003 and 2006 results are provided by the City of Toronto. All federal and provincial information is taken from Elections Canada and Elections Ontario.)
Election	Division	De facto party	Votes	%	Position	Result
1972 municipal	Toronto School Trustee, Ward Eight	Western Guard	247		11/11	Not elected
1974 municipal	Toronto City Council, Ward Four	Western Guard	200		7/7	Not elected
1976 municipal	Toronto School Trustee, Ward Nine	Western Guard	864		6/7	Not elected
1980 federal	St. Paul's	Nationalist	108		6/9	Not elected
1980 municipal	Toronto School Trustee, Ward Eight	Nationalist	1,319		6/9	Not elected
1982 municipal	Toronto School Trustee, Ward Eight	Nationalist	603		6/10	Not elected
1985 municipal	Toronto School Trustee, Ward Eight	Nationalist	935		5/7	Not elected
Ontario provincial by-election, April 1, 1993	St. George—St. David	Nationalist	72		8/9	Not elected
2003 municipal	Toronto City Councillor, Ward 31	Nationalist	414		4/4	Not elected
2006 municipal	Mayor of Toronto	Nationalist	1,105	0.19	20/38	Not elected

== See also ==
- James Alexander McQuirter
- Wolfgang Droege
