= Don Andrews =

Canadian white supremacist

- Born: Vilim Zlomislić; April 20, 1942 (age 83); Vojvodina, Nazi-occupied Serbia
- Education: Ryerson Polytechnical Institute; R. H. King Collegiate Institute
- Occupation: Political activist
- Mother: Rose Zlomislić

Donald Clarke Andrews (born April 20, 1942, as Vilim Zlomislić) is a Canadian white supremacist. He is the leader of the Nationalist Party of Canada and a perennial candidate for mayor of Toronto, Ontario.

== Early years ==
Zlomislić was born to Croat parents in the region of Vojvodina during World War II. His father was killed by the Nazis while fighting with the Yugoslav Partisans against the German occupation of Yugoslavia in late 1944. His mother, Rose, was shipped to Germany in 1943 to work as a slave labourer for the Nazis and Vilim was placed in an orphanage. In 1945, Rose was told that her son had been killed in an air raid. After the war, she met and married Frederick Andrews, a Canadian working for a United Nations agency in a German displaced persons' camp. The couple moved to Toronto.

Vilim remained at the orphanage and was a member of the Communist Young Pioneers in the post-war Socialist Federal Republic of Yugoslavia. He suffered an accident during a camping trip and a botched operation on his leg left him limping and permanently disabled.

His mother continued to search for him after the war through the assistance of the Red Cross, which located Vilim in 1952 and brought him to Canada where he was re-united with his mother and re-named Donald Clarke Andrews.

In Canada, Andrews developed a strong antipathy toward communism, which he blamed for his physical disability. After graduating from high school he began reading far-right tracts by the John Birch Society and George Lincoln Rockwell and adopted far-right and ultimately fascist ideas.

== Education and work ==
Andrews was educated at R. H. King Collegiate Institute in Scarborough, Ontario and subsequently took a public health inspection course at Ryerson Polytechnical Institute and earned his qualifications in 1964. He worked as a public health inspector in Scarborough in the 1970s. More recently, he has derived his income by being a landlord.

== Political activity ==
=== Edmund Burke Society ===
In the 1960s, Andrews was drawn to far right groups and cofounded the Edmund Burke Society with Paul Fromm and Leigh Smith in 1967.

=== Western Guard ===
Andrews became the primary leader of the group and transformed it into the antisemitic and white supremacist Western Guard in 1972. Paul Fromm split with Andrews shortly after the Western Guard was formed in 1972.

Andrews was the first person in Canada charged with wilfully promoting hatred, and in 1975 he was charged with offences ranging from plotting arson, possession of weapons and explosives, and mischief, for which he was sentenced to two years in jail.

Along with the Western Guard, he also plotted to bomb a visiting Israeli soccer team, although he was never charged for this. Consequently, the leadership of the Western Guard fell to John Ross Taylor in 1976.

In 1976, Andrews' home was the target of a bombing by Joseph Schachter, a member of the Jewish Defence League. The bomb caused damage to the home, but nobody was harmed.

=== Nationalist Party ===
Don Andrews is a Canadian perennial candidate, having run for Mayor of Toronto in 1972, 1974, 1976, 1988, 1991, 1994, 1997, 2003, 2010 and most recently in 2014, when he came in seventh place with 0.10% of the vote. In the 1974 election, Andrews placed a distant second in the mayoralty race as no serious candidate ran against popular incumbent, David Crombie. As a result, the municipal law was changed so that the runner-up in the mayoralty contest no longer had the right to succeed to the mayor's chair should the position become vacant between elections. Andrews has only run on occasions when his name appears first on the ballot. He sat out the 2000 municipal election in which fringe candidate Enza "Supermodel" Anderson was a candidate.

As of 1994, Andrews' organization had launched a campaign to celebrate "European Heritage Day," but when it was realized that the event was spearheaded by a neo-Nazi organization, the various cities approached rejected it or revoked their original decision. In 1998, Andrews tried a new tactic by attempting to get a European heritage week declared in London, Ontario. When it was recognized as a neo-Nazi attempt, an emergency vote was held by the municipal government, and the week was cancelled.

=== Dominica invasion attempt ===
Andrews was involved in the preliminary planning for Operation Red Dog, but left the group when they changed their target to Dominica.

== Electoral record ==
Electoral record
Election	Office	Votes	%	Position	Result
1972 Mayoral Toronto election	Mayor	1,960		5/7	Not elected
1974 Mayoral Toronto election	Mayor	5,662		2/11	Not elected
1976 Mayoral Toronto election	Mayor	7,126		2/10	Not elected
1988 Mayoral Toronto election	Mayor	5,690		4/9	Not elected
1991 Mayoral Toronto election	Mayor	1,968	1.01	4/9	Not elected
1994 Mayoral Toronto election	Mayor	2,839	1.74	5/11	Not elected
1997 Mayoral Toronto election	Mayor	1,985	0.26%	3/20	Not elected
2003 Mayoral Toronto election	Mayor	1,220	0.18	10/44	Not elected
2010 Mayoral Toronto election	Mayor	1,032	0.127%	19/40	Not elected
2014 Mayoral Toronto election	Mayor	1,012	0.10	7/65	Not elected

== See also ==
- Ku Klux Klan in Canada
- Neo-Nazism in Canada
