= Carter Churchill =

- Born: St. John's, Newfoundland and Labrador
- Occupation: Student
- Known for: Advocate for deaf and hard of hearing children
- Parents: Todd Churchill (father); Kimberly Churchill (mother)

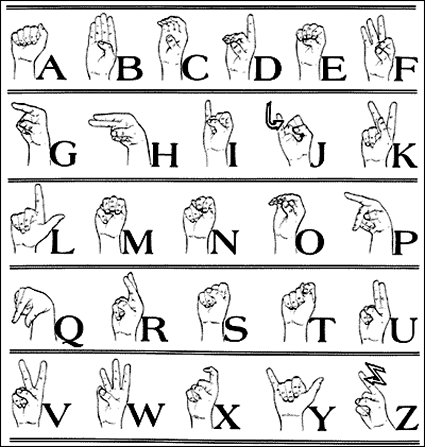
The Alphabet is shown in ASL

Carter Churchill was a Canadian elementary school student when he and his parents', Todd and Kim Churchill successfully challenged the Newfoundland and Labrador English School District, (NLEDS), with a Canadian human rights tribunal claiming that Carter, who is deaf, was being discriminated against by not having access to a full time American Sign Language (ASL) interpreter, while in the classroom.

== Background ==
Originally opened in 1964, NL's School for the Deaf was permanently closed in August 2010, due to lack of enrollment. Despite the NL government promising the same level of services and education throughout the public school system, the decision to close the school was criticized by parent's and advocates for the hard of hearing.

During the same time period, the government of NL had introduced an inclusive schools policy that would see all NL students attend regular classroom settings despite any need for individualized learning. Students with physical and mental disabilities, special needs and or behavioral issues were expected to share the same classrooms under the new policy. The policy was viewed as progressive by advocates, but also had many detractors, who stated that the inclusion policy was unfair to all students regardless of disability.

== Carter Churchill & The Reason for the Rink ==
Born prematurely in 2011, Carter Churchill was diagnosed as being deaf and having cerebral palsy. In an effort to raise awareness and money to support programs that helped their son, Todd and Kim Churchill built a replica NHL style hockey rink in their Portugal Cove, NL backyard. The Churchill family gained multiple sponsors for their backyard rink and rented the ice surface for charity hockey games, with the goal of raising seven thousand dollars to help support children with disabilities. After the first year, the Churchill rink had raised $34,500 towards NL charities. By 2016, with Carter now a kindergarten student, the Churchill rink had raised $193,000 for NL charities, and the Churchills had increased their charity goal to one million dollars. The Churchill rink was featured on Global News, during an "Everyday Hero," segment in 2016. In 2017, Todd Churchill announced he would postpone his yearly outdoor rink project to focus on lobbying the NL government for better education for deaf and hard of hearing children, claiming that his son Carter's educational needs were not being met. In total, the Churchill family raised $267,000 for local charities, before pausing the project.

== Human rights challenge ==
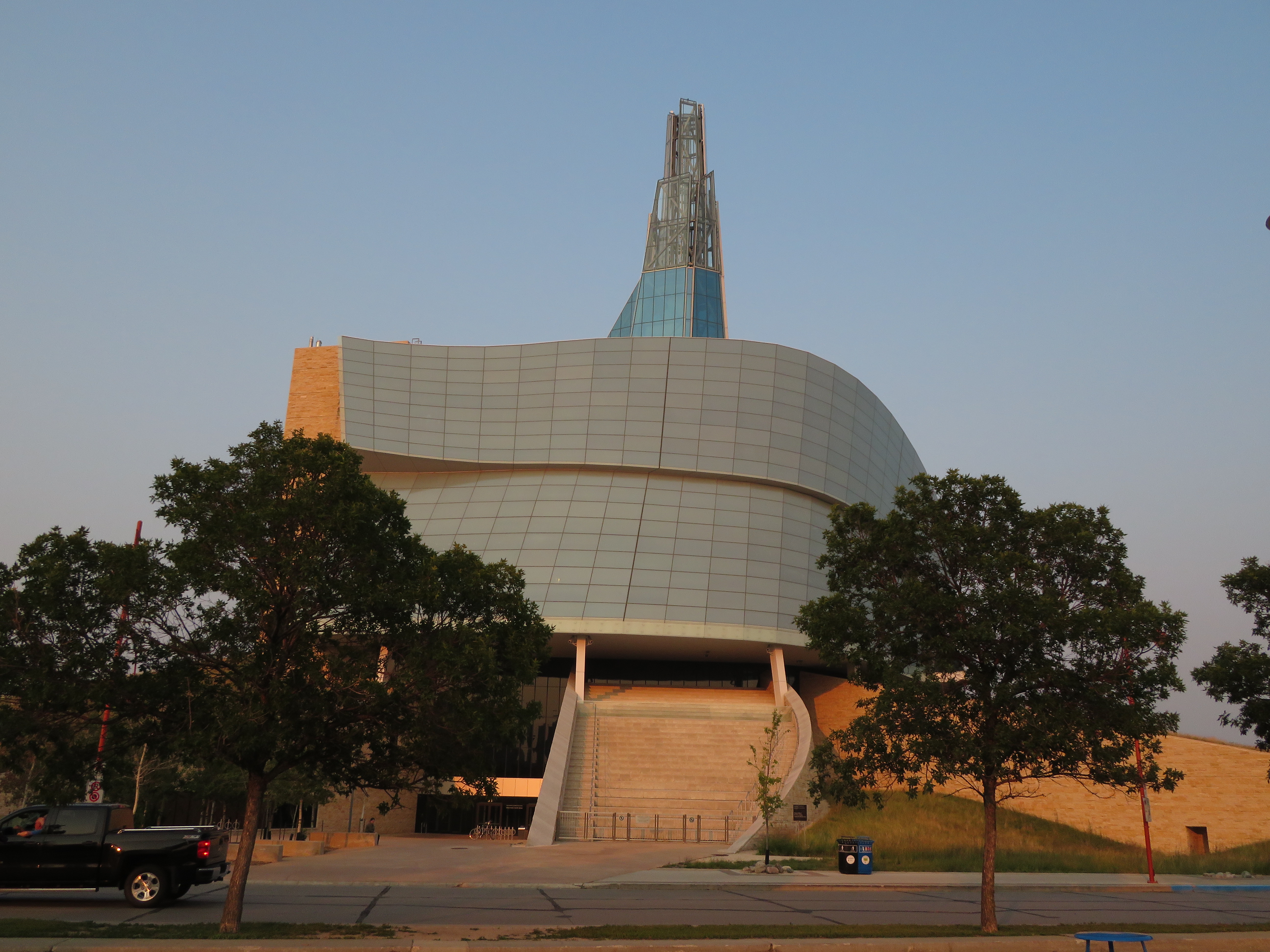
Canadian Museum for Human Rights, Winnipeg, Manitoba.

Unwilling to silently watch their child receive a substandard education, the Churchill family filed a Human rights complaint in the province of NL. With two years of attempting to mediate a resolution to their son's lack of education, Carter's parent's Todd and Kim had vowed to take the issue of Carter's education to the Supreme court of Canada.

In late August 2023, the Human Rights Tribunal of discrimination towards Carter Churchill by the NL English School District began in St. John's, NL. The hearing was the first tribunal to be livestreamed, and also the first to be interpreted in ASL for both the in-person hearing and livestream.

The tribunal opened with Carter's parent's Todd and Kim Churchill, explaining that their son had been discriminated by the NLESD by not providing Carter with a quality education that was equal to or on par with Carter's peers in the educational system. The NLESD disagreed stating that while they strive for a perfect educational experience, nothing is perfect and Carter's education thus far was reasonable. Tony Stack, the top education official in NL, argued that Carter's education was adequate, and he wasn't aware of any complaint(s) by the Churchill family until he learned of the Human Rights Complaint; despite one of Carters ASL teachers being incapable of signing her own name, and the Churchill's raising concerns about the quality of Carter's education since he attended kindergarten. In the end, the Churchill family were successful in their discrimination case against NLESD, and were awarded a settlement of $150,000.

== Aftermath ==
- In December 2022,Todd and Kim Churchill won an award from the Human Rights Commission of NL for their advocacy work for their son Carter, and for the deaf and hard of hearing community in general.
- The Newfoundland and Labrador English School District apologized to Carter and his family for their shortcomings in not providing Carter with a reasonable education, and fully accepted the finding of discrimination against Carter Churchill.
- After filing an access to information request, the Churchill family learned that the NLESD spent more than 682K thousand dollars since Carter was in Kindergarten, to defend themselves against complaint(s) by the Churchill family.
- In November 2023, Kim Churchill won the NDP bid to represent the NL provincial district of Conception Bay East-Bell island for a provincial by-election.
