= Free Dominion =

Canadian conservative internet forum

FD Logo

Free Dominion was a Canadian conservative internet forum. The site used the phrase "Principled Conservativism" to describe its ideology.

== Overview ==
The lead moderators and former owners of the site were Mark and Connie Fournier. Mark Fournier ran in the 2007 Ontario election for the Freedom Party of Ontario in Kingston and the Islands placing last with 137 votes (0.28%).

On December 31, 2005, Free Dominion made news when one of its frequent contributors, Gordon Stamp, resigned as Peter Goldring's campaign manager as a result of comments Stamp had posted on Free Dominion about being open to Alberta separatism under certain circumstances. Goldring was subsequently quoted saying that Free Dominion is "extreme" in its views.

In early 2008, the website was sold to Liberty News Service in Panama, with the Fourniers retaining operational control of the website.

== Human rights complaint ==
In July 2007, a complaint was made against Free Dominion before the Canadian Human Rights Commission for posting material perceived to be discriminatory against Muslims. The complaint was subsequently withdrawn.

== Defamation suits ==
Free Dominion and Connie and Mark Fournier have been defendants in a total of four lawsuits for defamation.

=== Defamation suits by Richard Warman ===
Among the suits against Free Dominion and the Fourniers were four filed by Richard Warman, a human rights lawyer. Three of the suits were for defamation and an additional unsuccessful suit was for copyright infringement. Of the three defamation suits, two have proceeded toward trial while a third, filed with Warren Kinsella as co-plaintiff, has been inactive.

==== "John Doe" lawsuit ====
In 2008, Warman sued the Fourniers and eight John Does for libel. As part of this case, Warman asked the court to order the Fourniers to release information which could assist in the identification of the eight John Does: their email addresses and IP addresses. Justice Kershman ordered them to do so. However on appeal, the Superior Court overturned this decision unless Warman could prove a prima facie case against the John Does before their information was released.

On August 9, 2013, the case finally began with jury selection. After 10 days of testimony, the jury was charged. On October 2, 2013, the jury found that Warman was maliciously defamed by 41 statements made on the website and awarded him $42,000 in damages, plus costs which were later set at $85,000. Superior Court Justice Robert Smith banned the site from republishing "in any form whatsoever," any of the 41 defamatory statements. Smith wrote in his decision that: "The continued publication of libellous material would cause irreparable harm to the plaintiff’s reputation and prohibited material has already been found to constitute libel." Smith wrote that as the jury found the defendants made the comments about Warman "maliciously" and refused to apologize, "I find that the plaintiff has met his onus of showing that an injunction should issue to prevent the defendants from publishing in any manner whatsoever any statements found to be defamatory of Mr. Warman in this action as set out in jury Exhibit J". As a result of the permanent injunction the Fourniers decided to close the Free Dominion forum to the public. On December 11, 2015, a panel of 3 justices of the Ontario Court of Appeal upheld the lower court's ruling and awarded Warman an additional $23,000 in costs. The site has been offline since the day the appeal decision was issued.

==== National Post et al ====
In April 2008, Warman filed an additional libel suit against the Fourniers and Free Dominion as well as the National Post columnist Jonathan Kay as well as the newspaper itself, and bloggers Ezra Levant, Kathy Shaidle and Kate McMillan of the Small Dead Animals blog for repeating allegations that Warman was the author of a 2003 internet post regarding Canadian Senator Anne Cools that used racist and sexist epithets. Warman denied that he was the author of the post. The National Post and Kay apologized, retracted the statement and settled out of court with Warman.

In June 2015, Shaidle, Levant and McMillan all settled with Warman in exchange for paying him undisclosed amounts and the issuing public retractions and apologies in which they admitted there was no evidence that the allegations against Warmn were true, leaving the Fourniers as the sole remaining defendants. The trial is pending.

=== John Baglow suit ===
Ottawa writer and former union official John Baglow, who blogs as "Dr. Dawg", filed suit against the Fourniers and Free Dominion participant Roger Smith over a post in which Smith referred to Baglow as "one of the Taliban’s more vocal supporters." In a March 2015 ruling, Madam Justice Heidi Polowin found the words to be defamatory and also rejected claims by the Fourniers that they were not publishers and not legally responsible for words posted by others on the Free Dominion forum stating that "To adopt the position of the defendants would leave potential plaintiffs with little ability to correct reputational damage," however she dismissed the suit ruling that in context of "rough and tumble" debate in the blogosphere the words, while defamatory, could be accepted as "fair comment". The judge awarded no costs to either side as "both sides were successful and unsuccessful".
