= Western Canada for Us =

Canadian white nationalist group

Western Canada For Us (WCFU) was a short-lived Alberta-based white nationalist group founded by Glenn Bahr and Peter Kouba in early 2004. The WCFU was formally dissolved on May 11, 2004, four days after Bahr's residence in Edmonton, Alberta, was raided by members of the Edmonton Hate Crimes division . The police proceeded to, "[seize] the computers involved in running the web site and Bahr's extensive collection of neo-Nazi paraphernalia."

While it was in existence, the WCFU hosted a meeting in Red Deer, Alberta attended by Paul Fromm and Melissa Guille as well as a rally in support of Holocaust denier Ernst Zündel. A chapter of the WCFU was formed under the leadership of Jamie Murphy (Irishcream) in Winnipeg, Manitoba though after a disastrous rally Murphy ended the Manitoba chapter. Another chapter had been planned for Vancouver, British Columbia to be led by Chris Brown (mobil300) when Bahr's residence was raided by the police and the WCFU was dissolved.

While their website was very successful in garnering support for the WCFU – the forum was very active with members and supporters from all over Canada and the United States – the success of the WCFU website ultimately led to the group's dissolution. One of the reasons provided for the raid on Bahr's home were the links on the WCFU website to The Turner Diaries and other materials deemed to promote hatred and as such are in violation of Canadian hate speech laws.

The WCFU, Glenn Bahr and Peter Kouba were subjects of a Canadian Human Rights Commission complaint initiated by Richard Warman which went before the Canadian Human Rights Tribunal for a hearing. The tribunal found that Bahr, Kouba and the WCFU had wilfully spread hatred "against Jews, mentally disabled people, aboriginals, gays, lesbians, Chinese, Arabs, blacks and other non-whites." The founders of the WCFU and the organization itself were each fined $5000.00 and issued to cease promoting hate speech online. In addition to the human right complaint Bahr is being prosecuted criminally for violating Canadian hate speech laws.
