= Alykhan Velshi =

American-Canadian politician

- Born: 6 February 1984 (age 42)

Alykhan Velshi (born 6 February 1984) is a lawyer, policy analyst, and ministerial assistant. He has worked at the predominantly neoconservative American Enterprise Institute and was manager of research at the Foundation for Defense of Democracies, where he co-founded the Center for Law and Counterterrorism with Andrew C. McCarthy. He has written pieces in support of George W. Bush's foreign and military policies. Velshi previously worked as director of issues management for Stephen Harper. He used to work as chief of staff for two leaders of the official opposition of Ontario, Patrick Brown and Vic Fedeli, who were then leader of the Ontario Progressive Conservative Party. Currently he is working in the private sector as Huawei Technologies Canada's vice-president of corporate affairs.

== Early life ==
Velshi was born and raised in Toronto. He attended the Toronto French School, a private school in Lawrence Park. He holds a law degree from the London School of Economics and passed the New York bar exam in 2006. He is the son of the past President and CEO of the Canadian Nuclear Safety Commission (CNSC) Rumina Velshi. He is an Ismaili Muslim and is a distant relative of journalist Ali Velshi and former Liberal Member of Provincial Parliament Murad Velshi.

== Political views ==
=== Foreign policy and the Middle East ===
Velshi has written extensively about foreign policy, particularly with regard to the Middle East. His position is pro-Israel and strongly supportive of George W. Bush's foreign policy. In a December 2002 letter to the National Post newspaper, he argued that Canada should ban the political wing of Hezbollah. While attending the LSE, he wrote an academic piece defending George W. Bush's argument for "preemptive" war in Iraq as being grounded in both historical precedent and "original texts on international law". Just before graduating, he wrote an article for the National Review entitled "Choosing Sides: The challenge for Muslims", in which he argued that moderate Muslims were often reluctant to counter what he described as "Islamist extremism". This article favourably quoted George W. Bush's remark, "You're either with us or you're with the terrorists". In January 2006, he criticized The Globe and Mail newspaper for referring to Israel's separation barrier as a "wall"; Velshi argued that it should be called a "fence."

Velshi wrote a column for The Hill in June 2006, encouraging the United States Senate to endorse regime change in Iran by passing the Iran Freedom Support Act. This bill authorized the President of the United States to provide $10 million in assistance to dissident organizations inside and outside Iran. Velshi attempted to address concerns that this aid would be directed toward militant organizations by arguing that the terms of the bill restricted aid to groups that "oppose the use of terrorism, support democratic values and human rights and display a willingness to commit Iran to the existing nuclear non-proliferation framework".

In the same year, Velshi wrote an article for the Somaliland Times entitled "Somalia's Collapse into Jihadism". He called for the United States to recognize the breakaway republic of Somaliland, arguing that this would demonstrate a commitment to the "Bush doctrine" and also be in America's strategic interests. He also opposed the Union of Islamic Courts in Somalia, and defended the government of Ethiopia for supporting what he described as the "democratically-elected transitional government based in Baidoa".

Velshi later supported the prosecution of two New York men accused of broadcasting Hezbollah's al-Manar television network in the United States.

=== Security and terror suspects ===
In 2006, Andrew C. McCarthy and Velshi wrote a white paper entitled "We Need A National Security Court". This work argued that America's counter-terrorism strategies of the 1990s were insufficient for responding to what the authors described as the "international terrorist threat" after September 11, 2001. They called for the establishment of an American national security court, to be staffed by independent, life-tenured judges with responsibility for the full range of national security issues.

In September 2006, Velshi and Howard Anglin wrote an article for the National Review entitled "Who's Really Ignoring the Geneva Conventions?". This piece argued that the conventions "did not anticipate the threat posed by today's militant Islamists", and should not be applied to enemy combatants whom the authors identified as "the terrorists we fight today".

=== United Nations ===
In August 2006, Velshi wrote a piece entitled "The United Nations' Failed Peacekeeping in Lebanon". This work asserted that the United Nations Interim Force in Lebanon had failed to disarm Hezbollah, and argued that a "new international force [would] therefore have to be willing and able to engage offensive operations" against the Lebanese organization.

Later in the year, Velshi wrote an article entitled "Will the UN appoint another crook?". This work described Kofi Annan's legacy as United Nations Secretary-General as one of "scandal and failure", asserting that the UN was implicated in an "elaborate child prostitution ring" in the Congo and referring to the UN's Oil-For-Food program in Iraq as "the biggest financial fraud of modern times". Velshi also described Annan's eventual successor Ban Ki-moon, as unfit for the position, accusing him of bribery and of holding anti-American views. In the same article, Velshi accused United States Secretary of State Condoleezza Rice of "allowing bureaucratic subordinates in the State Department to dictate policy, refusing to draw bright lines in international negotiations with Iran, and distinguishing herself from her predecessor Colin Powell only by being less perfidious and perhaps more comely".

=== Canada ===
In late 2006, Velshi described the prosecution of Canadian-born newspaper baron Conrad Black as a "tragedy", and as representative of a legal system "focused less on securing justice than on bringing down the high and mighty while pandering to the politics of envy". He argued that the legal proceedings had ruined Black's financial status and reputation before any finding of guilt, and further asserted that the regulatory state created by Franklin Roosevelt's New Deal was ultimately responsible for this situation. In the same article, Velshi wrote that Black "hearkened back to the good old days of grand newspaper proprietors, family dynasties and concern for the value of the brand rather than vulgar things like day-to-day movements in share prices". Black was subsequently convicted of obstruction of justice and diverting company funds for his personal benefit, and was sentenced to 78 months in an American prison.

Velshi described Canada's health care system as "old and decrepit" in a March 2006 letter to The Globe and Mail newspaper, sarcastically comparing Canada's system to existing models in Cuba and North Korea.

In 2011, Velshi left government service and founded a website to promote the ideas put forward by Ezra Levant in his book Ethical Oil: The Case for Canada's Oil Sands. He subsequently returned as the Director of Planning for the Prime Minister's Office later in 2011. The website, EthicalOil.org, launched a campaign to compare Canada's 'Ethical Oil' against OPEC's 'Conflict Oil' and features controversial advertisements comparing conditions for women, gays and other minorities in OPEC countries to those in Canada. EthicalOil.org has staged counter-protests in response to opposition to the Keystone XL pipeline project.

== Ministerial aide ==
=== 39th Canadian parliament ===
Velshi was hired as senior special assistant to Jason Kenney, Canada's newly appointed Minister of Citizenship and Immigration, in early 2007. His official title was changed to "Director of Communications" later in the year.

Velshi supported flying of the Canadian Red Ensign at the Canadian National Vimy Memorial in 2007, describing the flag as "an enduring source of Canadian patriotism". Senator Roméo Dallaire criticized this decision, arguing that the Red Ensign did not deserve to be placed on equal footing with the Flag of Canada and the Flag of France. Velshi later defended the Conservative government decision's not to fly flags at half-mast for Canadian soldiers killed in combat, arguing that this gesture was not permitted under Canadian law.

Velshi was the official contact on a late 2007 government press release commemorating the Jewish celebration of Hanukkah, wherein the festival was erroneously described as marking "the triumph of the Jewish people against tyranny more than two million years ago". He later said that the document went through several revisions before its release, and that the word "millennia" was accidentally changed to "million years" somewhere along the way.

Velshi moved to the department of Environment Minister John Baird in August 2008 as Director of Parliamentary Affairs, where he was responsible for "advising and briefing the minister on legislative issues [and] overseeing the legislative approval process". The Hill Times described this as an important position, in that Velshi had a role in formulating the government's response to Liberal Party Stéphane Dion's proposed Green Tax Shift.

=== 40th Canadian parliament ===
Jason Kenney was promoted to Minister of Citizenship and Immigration after the 2008 federal election, and Velshi returned to work with him as Director of Communications and Parliamentary Affairs.

In late 2008, Velshi articulated the Harper government's position that conscientious objectors from the United States military were not legitimate refugees in Canada. He also defended the government's introduction of limits on the refugee and immigration process on the grounds a few months later, on the grounds that failed refugee claimants and others were abusing the federal pre-removal risk assessment program (which is intended to ensure that people will not be deported from Canada to face torture).

=== March 2009 controversies ===
Canadian Arab Federation

See also Canadian Arab Federation - Dispute with Jason Kenney and Federal Funding

In early 2009, Jason Kenney became involved in a public controversy with Canadian Arab Federation (CAF) president Khaled Mouammar. At one stage, Mouammar responded to Kenney's support for Israel in the 2008-2009 Israel-Gaza conflict by describing the minister as a "professional whore who supports war". Kenney later accused CAF leaders of promoting anti-Semitism, and suggested that the organization's funding would be reviewed. Other CAF representatives described Mouammar's choice of language as unfortunate, but rejected the charge of anti-Semitism and expressed concern that the proposed cuts were vindictive in nature. In March, the CAF circulated a letter in which several organizations called for Prime Minister Stephen Harper to "restrain" Kenney and "put an end to his dangerous campaign of attacking [the] CAF with slandering and damaging accusations for which he has provided no evidence".

Velshi offered that the signatories to this letter represented only a "tiny" and "quite radicalized minority" of Arab-Canadian organizations. He added that Kenney's position toward the CAF was unchanged, and was quoted as saying, "Groups that promote hatred and anti-Semitism don't deserve a single red cent of taxpayer support. End of story." The National Post's coverage of this matter noted that the letter circulated by the CAF condemned "all forms of racism" and asserted that the CAF's criticism of Israeli military policies had been wrongly conflated with anti-Semitism.

On 18 March, Velshi on behalf of Minister Kenney announced that government funding to the CAF would not be renewed after the current contracts expire. CAF executive director Mohamed Boudjenane expressed surprise at this decision, indicating that these contracts allowed his organization to help settle and provide English lessons for recent immigrants.

In a subsequent email sent to Arab organizations, CAF President Khaled Mouammar argued that the CAF was the victim of a "well-planned Zionist campaign ... being waged by the Canadian Jewish Congress and B'nai Brith supported by some politicians" to intimidate Arab Canadians. He also stated that this campaign "was developed after the Lebanon war of July, 2006, to suppress all criticism of Israel and equate it with anti-Semitism." Velshi argued in response that Mouammar's naming of the Canadian Jewish Congress and B'nai Brith "[did] not just disdain Zionists, but the Jewish community as a whole." He also said of Mouammar's email, "It's the ugliest, most vile sort of language. It's not surprising to us that he is again engaged in this sort of reprehensible rhetoric trying to pit community against community."

Velshi also reported Kenney was considering re-examining all refugee cases heard by Mouammar during his tenure as a member of Canada's Immigration and Refugee Board (IRB), after reports surfaced that the acceptance rate in cases heard by Mouammar was disproportionately higher than the average rate. Velshi stated that "I think it's fair for Canadians to ask why Mouammar's acceptance rate was so much higher than the IRB average for the same countries, as well as whether he was letting people in who he shouldn't have."

George Galloway

On 20 March 2009, a Canada Border official refused British politician George Galloway permission to enter Canada, likely based on the "preliminary decision of inadmissibility" made by the Canadian government. Velshi told the media that the Canadian government would not reverse this decision, stating that Galloway had expressed sympathy for the Taliban cause in Afghanistan and describing him as an "infandous street-corner Cromwell who actually brags about giving 'financial support' to Hamas, a terrorist organisation banned in Canada. The decision to ban Galloway was supported by the Canadian Jewish Congress, B'nai Brith Canada and Jewish Defence League of Canada, which took credit for initiating the action. It was subsequently noted that Velshi had begun preparing media lines regarding Galloway several days before the ban was announced.

Galloway described the decision to forbid him entry as "irrational, inexplicable and an affront to Canada's good name", adding that it "further vindicated the anti-war movement's contention that unjust wars abroad will end up consuming the very liberties that make us who we are". He threatened legal action against the Harper government, asserting that he was not a supporter of terrorism and was not barred from entering any other country, including Israel.

Velshi defended the Kenney's decision to the media, saying that the minister would not "provide special treatment to a man who brags about giving 'financial support' to Hamas, a banned terrorist organization in Canada, or who offers sympathy for Canada's enemies in Afghanistan [...]."

The National Post suggested that Galloway did support Hamas by citing a 2007 interview in which he described them as a national liberation movement rather than a terrorist organization. Galloway later stated, "I don't raise money for Hamas. That's just a false statement. I am not now, nor have I ever been, a supporter of Hamas."

New Democratic Party MP Olivia Chow accused the Harper government of censorship for refusing to allow Galloway to speak in Canada. Galloway was ultimately not able to enter Canada, but instead addressed his supporters by a video link.

On 27 September 2010, Federal Court judge Richard Mosley found that Kenney's office had acted inappropriately, using "a flawed and overreaching interpretation of the standards under Canadian law for labelling someone as engaging in terrorism or being a member of a terrorist organization." He also determined that the Canada Border Services Agency had produced its assessment of Galloway on scant evidence after receiving instructions from Velshi. Noting that Velshi had told reporters the decision to bar Galloway was made on national security grounds, Mosley wrote, "one might hope that a ministerial aide would exercise greater restraint in purporting to speak on behalf of the government, his comments to the press amount to little more than posturing." In October 2010, Galloway said he would sue the Canadian Government for breaching his privacy rights and branding him a terrorist.
