= NSPC =

NSPC is an abbreviation that can refer to:

- National School of Public Policy in Pakistan
- National Schools Press Conference in the Philippines
- National-Socialist Party of Canada in Canada
- Provincial Court of Nova Scotia
- Neural Stem/Progenitor Cells
