= Hate speech laws in Canada =

Canadian laws relating to hate speech

Hate speech laws in Canada include provisions in the federal Criminal Code, as well as statutory provisions relating to hate publications in three provinces and one territory.

The Criminal Code creates criminal offences with respect to different aspects of hate propaganda, although without defining the term "hatred". Those offences are decided in the criminal courts and carry penal sanctions, such as fines, probation orders and imprisonment.

Alberta, British Columbia, Saskatchewan and the Northwest Territories have created civil sanctions for hate publications in their human rights legislation. Those claims are resolved through administrative tribunals or the civil courts, and can involve civil remedies such as damages or injunctive relief.

The Supreme Court of Canada has rejected constitutional challenges to the hate propaganda offences in the Criminal Code, and has also rejected challenges to the hate publication provisions in human rights legislation. The Court has ruled that while the provisions restrict freedom of expression, the restrictions are justifiable under section 1 of the Canadian Charter of Rights and Freedoms.

== Meaning of "hatred" ==
The various laws that refer to "hatred" do not define it. The Supreme Court has explained the meaning of the term in various cases that have come before the Court. For example, in R v Keegstra, decided in 1990, Chief Justice Dickson for the majority explained the meaning of "hatred" in the context of the Criminal Code:

Hatred is predicated on destruction, and hatred against identifiable groups therefore thrives on insensitivity, bigotry and destruction of both the target group and of the values of our society. Hatred in this sense is a most extreme emotion that belies reason; an emotion that, if exercised against members of an identifiable group, implies that those individuals are to be despised, scorned, denied respect and made subject to ill-treatment on the basis of group affiliation.

In 2013, Justice Rothstein, speaking for the unanimous court, explained the meaning of "hatred" in similar terms, in relation to the Saskatchewan Human Rights Code:

In my view, "detestation" and "vilification" aptly describe the harmful effect that the Code seeks to eliminate. Representations that expose a target group to detestation tend to inspire enmity and extreme ill-will against them, which goes beyond mere disdain or dislike. Representations vilifying a person or group will seek to abuse, denigrate or delegitimize them, to render them lawless, dangerous, unworthy or unacceptable in the eyes of the audience. Expression exposing vulnerable groups to detestation and vilification goes far beyond merely discrediting, humiliating or offending the victims.

== Canadian Charter of Rights and Freedoms ==
Laws dealing with hatred have to be measured against the Canadian Charter of Rights and Freedoms, which is part of the Constitution of Canada. Section 2 of the Charter protects freedom of expression, including freedom of the press, and also freedom of religion. Section 1 of the Charter guarantees the rights and freedoms set out in the Charter, but also recognizes that the rights and freedoms are subject to reasonable limits, provided the limits are prescribed by law and "can be demonstrably justified in a free and democratic society."

== Hatred offences of the Criminal Code ==
=== Origin of the provisions ===
In the early 1960s, concerns were raised by various public groups (such as the Canadian Jewish Congress), by some media outlets, and by some politicians (such as John Diefenbaker, then Leader of the Opposition) about the rise of hate publications in Canada. The federal government of Prime Minister Lester Pearson responded by appointing a committee in January 1965 to study the issue and make recommendations about legislation: the Special Committee on Hate Propaganda in Canada, commonly referred to as the "Cohen Committee" after its chair, Maxwell Cohen.

The Minister of Justice, Guy Favreau appointed the seven members of the committee: Maxwell Cohen, Dean of Law at McGill University; Dr. James A. Corry, Principal of Queen's University; Father Gérard Dion, professor of industrial relations at Université Laval; Saul Hayes, QC, executive vice-president of the Canadian Jewish Congress; Mark MacGuigan, then a professor of law at the University of Toronto; Shane MacKay, executive editor of the Winnipeg Free Press; and Pierre-Elliott Trudeau, then a professor of law at the Université de Montréal. In Keegstra, Chief Justice Dickson described this group as "a particularly strong committee".

In 1966, the committee made its report. It recommended that Parliament enact legislation to combat hate speech and genocide. The Pearson government promptly introduced the legislation, proposing three new offences: advocating genocide; publicly inciting hatred in a way likely to lead to a breach of the peace; and wilfully promoting hatred. The bill then took four years to wend its way through Parliament. The bill finally passed in 1970, under the government of Pierre Trudeau, by that time Prime Minister of Canada.

=== Outline of the provisions ===
The Criminal Code is a federal statute passed by the Parliament of Canada, which has exclusive constitutional jurisdiction over the criminal law in Canada. There are three separate hatred-related offences: section 318 (advocating genocide), section 319(1) (publicly inciting hatred likely to lead to a breach of the peace), and section 319(2) (wilfully promoting hatred). In addition to the three offences, there are provisions which authorize the courts to order the seizure of hate propaganda, either in physical formats (section 320) or in electronic formats (section 320.1).

For all three offences, there is no minimum punishment. Although imprisonment is a possible sentence, so too are punishments such as probation or fines.

There are two important phrases which are used in the different provisions: "identifiable group" and "hate propaganda". The terms have the following meanings:

- "identifiable group", used in the three offences in s. 318 and s. 319, is defined by s. 318(4) as "any section of the public distinguished by colour, race, religion, ethnic origin or sexual orientation, gender identity or expression, or mental or physical disability." (When originally enacted in 1970, the definition was limited to "colour, race, religion or ethnic origin", but it has been expanded over the years, most recently in 2017 by the addition of gender identity and expression.
- "hate propaganda", used in s. 320 and s. 320.1, is defined by s. 320(8) to mean "any writing, sign or visible representation that advocates or promotes genocide or the communication of which by any person would constitute an offence under section 319."

==== Section 318: Advocating genocide ====
Section 318 makes it an offence to advocate or promote genocide, which is defined as killing members of an identifiable group, or inflicting conditions of life on a group which are calculated to bring about the physical destruction of the group. The offence is indictable, and carries a maximum penalty of imprisonment not exceeding five years. There is no minimum punishment. The consent of the provincial Attorney General is required for a charge to be laid under this section.

==== Section 319: Inciting or promoting hatred ====
Section 319(1): Publicly inciting hatred—makes it an offence to communicate statements in a public place which incite hatred against an identifiable group, where it is likely to lead to a breach of the peace. The Crown prosecutor can proceed either by indictment or by summary process. The maximum penalty is imprisonment of not more than two years. There is no minimum punishment.

Section 319(2): Promoting hatred—makes it an offence to wilfully promote hatred against any identifiable group, by making statements (other than in private conversation). The Crown prosecutor can proceed either by indictment or by summary process. The maximum penalty is imprisonment of not more than two years.

Section 319(3): Four defences—provides specific defences to the offence of promoting hatred. A person will not be convicted if:

- the person establishes that the statements communicated were true;
- in good faith, the person expressed or attempted to establish by an argument an opinion on a religious subject or an opinion based on a belief in a religious text;
- the statements were relevant to any subject of public interest, the discussion of which was for the public benefit, and if on reasonable grounds the person believed them to be true; or
- in good faith, the person intended to point out, for the purpose of removal, matters producing or tending to produce feelings of hatred toward an identifiable group in Canada.

==== Sections 320, 320.1: Confiscation of hate propaganda ====
Section 320 allows a judge to confiscate publications which appear to be hate propaganda, after due notice to the apparent owner of the material and the owner of the premises where the material is found, and after a hearing.

Section 320.1 allows a judge to make similar orders with respect to confiscation of hate propaganda stored electronically, and to order that hate propaganda which is made available to the public by electronic means be taken down.

=== Cases under the Criminal Code ===
==== Section 318: Advocating genocide ====
===== Mugesera v Canada (Minister of Citizenship and Immigration) (2005) =====
The Supreme Court of Canada considered the meaning of the offence of advocating genocide (section 318) in a deportation case, Mugesera v. Canada (Minister of Citizenship and Immigration). The individual was an immigrant from Rwanda. The Court found that he was a member of a hard-line Hutu party, and that he had made a speech during the Rwandan genocide, calling for his listeners to kill members of the Tutsi ethnic group. The Court found that would constitute the offence of advocating genocide under s. 318, if it had occurred in Canada, and therefore met the legal standard for deporting the individual.

==== Section 319(2): Wilfully promoting hatred ====
===== R v Buzzanga and Durocher (1979) =====
The case of R v Buzzanga and Durocher was one of the first cases to consider this offence had unusual facts. The accused were both French-Canadian. During a heated debate in their municipality about the construction of a school to be operated in French, they circulated a pamphlet containing anti-French-Canadian statements. Upon being charged with the offence of wilfully promoting hatred, their defence was that they circulated the pamphlet to expose prejudice in the community against French-Canadians. The Ontario Court of Appeal held that in the unusual circumstances, it was not clear if they had "wilfully" intended to promote hatred. The Court set aside their convictions and ordered a new trial.

===== R v Keegstra (1990) =====
R v Keegstra is the major Supreme Court decision on the offence of promoting hatred. The accused was a high school teacher. In his social studies class, he taught his students extreme antisemitic views. The students were expected to repeat this material on their examinations. If they failed to do so, their marks suffered.

The accused was charged with promoting hatred against the Jewish people. He challenged the constitutionality of the offence of promoting hatred under s. 319(2), arguing that it infringed his freedom of expression under s. 2(b) of the Charter. He also challenged the requirement under s. 319(3)(a) that he was required to prove the truth of his statements, arguing that placing the onus of proof on him infringed the presumption of innocence guaranteed by s. 11(d) of the Charter. He was successful in those arguments at trial and on appeal to the Alberta Court of Appeal. The Crown appealed to the Supreme Court.

By a 4–3 majority, the Supreme Court dismissed his constitutional challenges. Speaking for the majority, Chief Justice Dickson agreed that the offence of promoting hatred infringed the guarantee of freedom of expression, but upheld the infringement as a reasonable limit under s. 1 of the Charter. He also agreed that the reverse onus of proof in s. 319(a) infringed the presumption of innocence, but that placing the onus on the accused to prove the truth of his statements was a reasonable restriction under s. 1. He therefore set aside the acquittal and ordered a new trial.

Speaking for the dissent, Justice McLachlin (as she then was) agreed with the Chief Justice that the two provisions infringed s. 2(b) and s. 11(d). However, she did not think that the provisions could be justified under s. 1. She would have dismissed the appeal.

===== R v Andrews (1990) =====
R v Andrews was a companion case to R v Keegstra, heard and decided by the Supreme Court at the same time. The accused were Don Andrews, the leader of the white supremacist Nationalist Party of Canada, and Robert Wayne Smith, the secretary of the party. The police seized written material which was anti-Semitic and anti-black. The accused were convicted at trial and the convictions were upheld on appeal to the Ontario Court of Appeal.

The Supreme Court dismissed the appeal, by the same 4–3 majority as in Keegstra. Chief Justice Dickson for the majority and Justice McLachlin for the dissent each relied on their reasons from the Keegstra case.

===== R v Krymowski (2005) =====
R v Krymowski was a decision of the Supreme Court concerning charges of promoting hatred against Roma people. Some Roma individuals who were seeking refugee status in Canada were staying in a motel. A crowd of people gathered outside the motel with signs, chanting and displaying statements against "gypsies", including statements of "White power". Some participants were seen giving the "Sieg Heil" Nazi salute.

The trial judge acquitted the accused on the basis that there was no evidence that "gypsies" were the same as Roma people. The Supreme Court unanimously allowed the appeal and set aside the acquittals, on the basis that the trial judge should have relied on ordinary dictionary meanings and accept that the references to "gypsies" were reference to the Roma people.

===== R v Presseault (2007) =====
In the 2007 case of R v Presseault, a Montreal neo-Nazi, Jean-Sebastien Presseault, pled guilty to a charge of willfully promoting hatred toward blacks and Jews on his website, contrary to s. 319(2). The Court of Quebec sentenced him to six months in jail, rejecting the defence position that the sentence be served in the community. The sentencing judge called Presseault's remarks "despicable, evil, and nauseating". The judge also referred to Pressault's more than 20 tattoos, including several Ku Klux Klan and Nazi symbols covering the defendant's torso, in his decision to give jail time: "The harm that he has done to his own body to leave a lasting impression of his beliefs clearly shows that he has unresolved issues and is filled with racist feelings and hate." The judge also cited Presseault's criminal record for violent offences in concluding that the safety of the public would be jeopardised by allowing him to serve his sentence in the community.

===== R v Popescu (2009) =====
During the 2008 federal election, David Popescu, a perennial candidate in Sudbury, Ontario, answered a question at a high school by saying "homosexuals should be executed". He was subsequently charged with wilful promotion of hatred and stated during the trial that his views were consistent with the Bible. In 2009, the Ontario Court of Justice found Popescu guilty and sentenced him to 18 months of probation. Popescu was investigated again in 2015, based on election pamphlets which made similar statements about the gay community. However, these charges were later dropped.

===== R v Ahenakew (2009) =====
In 2002, David Ahenakew was a speaker at a conference in Saskatoon. Based on two sets of comments he made that day, first during his speech to the conference, and a second set of comments made to a reporter afterwards, he was charged with promoting hatred against people of the Jewish faith. In 2005, the Provincial Court of Saskatchewan found that there was a reasonable doubt whether Ahenakew intended to promote hatred in his initial statement to the conference. However, with respect to the interview Ahenakew gave to the reporter, the Provincial Court found that Ahenakew did intend to promote hatred. The Provincial Court convicted him of the offence and fined him $1,000.

Ahenakew appealed to the Saskatchewan Court of Queen's Bench, arguing that the conversation with the reporter was a private conversation, and also that his statements did not meet the test for wilfully promoting hatred. In 2006, the Queen's Bench allowed the appeal, holding that the statement to the reporter was a public statement, noting that Ahenakew was an experienced politician who had given many interviews, and the reporter had begun the conversation by saying he wished to conduct an interview. However, the Queen's Bench held that the trial judge had not properly considered the context of the interview, where Ahenakew was responding to questions posed to him, and in the context he may not have had the intention of wilfully promoting hatred. The Queen's Bench therefore set aside the conviction and ordered a new trial. The Crown appealed the decision to the Saskatchewan Court of Appeal, which upheld the decision of the Queen's Bench.

After the conviction was overturned on appeal, the Crown brought the matter back for a re-trial in Provincial Court, which acquitted Ahenakew in 2009. The Court stated that remarks were "revolting, disgusting, and untrue", but they did not constitute "promoting hatred".

===== Your Ward News (2019) =====
In 2017, James Sears and LeRoy St. Germaine, the editor and publisher of a newsletter promoting rape legalization and Holocaust denial, were charged with willful promotion of hatred against women and Jews. This was the first case in which a court found that women were the target of hate speech. The newsletter, Your Ward News, was delivered monthly to homes in Toronto before the federal government ordered Canada Post to cease distribution in 2016. Ontario Court of Justice Judge Richard Blouin disagreed with the defendants' claim that the publication was meant to be satire, noting "both men were fully aware of the unrelenting promotion of hate." Both were found guilty on January 24, 2019. The office of the Attorney General of Ontario noted that this was the first charge and conviction in Ontario for promoting hate against women.

== Human rights laws and hate publication ==
Federal human rights laws formerly included a restriction on hate publications on matters coming within federal jurisdiction, but the provision was repealed in 2014.

Three provinces and one territory have provisions relating to hate publications laws in their human rights laws. Alberta, British Columbia, Saskatchewan and the Northwest Territories all have enacted provisions relating to hate publications, from a civil remedy perspective. There are some variants in the scope of each of the provisions.

=== Former federal law ===
The Canadian Human Rights Act formerly had a provision, section 13, dealing with communication of hate messages in matters under federal jurisdiction, such as telecommunications. Although the Supreme Court of Canada upheld the constitutionality of the provision in Canada (Human Rights Commission) v. Taylor, Parliament repealed section 13 in 2013, with the repeal coming into force one year later.

In 2019, the Canadian House of Commons Standing Committee on Justice and Human Rights launched a study on online hate. In its report on June 17, 2019, it made several recommendations for government actions to counter online hate, including adding a provision for a civil remedy similar to the former s. 13 of the Code.

=== Alberta ===
==== Provisions of the Alberta Human Rights Act ====
The Alberta Human Rights Act prohibits hate signs, notices, publications and statements which are "likely to expose a person or a class of persons to hatred or contempt", based on their "race, religious beliefs, colour, gender, gender identity, gender expression, physical disability, mental disability, age, ancestry, place of origin, marital status, source of income, family status or sexual orientation." There are then several qualifications to that prohibition, including a provision that it is not to "interfere with the free expression of any opinion on any subject.

Any person who believes there has been a breach of the Human Rights Act may file a complaint with the Alberta Human Rights Commission. If the Commission believes the complaint has merit, the Commission refers the complaint to the Alberta Human Rights Tribunal for a hearing. If the Tribunal upholds the complaint, it can order remedies of a civil nature, which may include monetary damages. The Tribunal's decision can be appealed to the Alberta Court of King's Bench. Breach of the hatred provision is not an offence.

==== Cases under the Alberta Human Rights Act (2009) ====
===== Complaint against the Edmonton Journal and the Calgary Herald =====
On April 2, 2002, the Edmonton Journal and the Calgary Herald published an editorial which reported that a meeting of the Organisation of the Islamic Conference was taking place in Malaysia on the subject of terrorism. The editorial said the meeting would "no doubt be a farce". The editorial went on to disparage the behaviour of Muslims, especially the Palestinians. Muslim and Palestinian organizations and their supporters filed a complaint about the editorial to the Alberta Human Rights and Citizenship Commission. The complainants said the editorial was likely to incite hatred and contempt toward Palestinian Arabs and Muslims. On September 21, 2009, the director of the Commission dismissed the complaints.

===== Lund v Boissoin (2012) =====
The case of Lund v Boissoin was based on a letter-to-the-editor sent to the Red Deer Advocate by Reverend Stephen Boissoin in June 2002. The Advocate published the letter, which said it was aimed at anyone who "supports the homosexual machine that has been mercilessly gaining ground in our society since the 1960s." Dr. Darren Lund filed a complaint about Boissoin's remarks to the commission. Although a human rights panel found that the letter infringed the Alberta Human Rights Act, the Alberta Court of Queen's Bench overturned the ruling on appeal. The Alberta Court of Appeal confirmed the Queen's Bench decision.

===== Complaint against Ezra Levant (2008) =====
In 2006, the Muslim Council of Edmonton and the Islamic Supreme Council of Canada filed a complaint to the Commission when Ezra Levant published cartoons that were featured first in Denmark in the magazine Jyllands-Posten. The Commission dismissed the complaint on August 5, 2008. Levant said that he spent "tens of thousands of dollars" defending himself from the complaint.

=== British Columbia ===
==== Provisions of the Human Rights Code (British Columbia) ====
The Human Rights Code of British Columbia provides that no-one is to publish any publication, statement, emblem or other representation that "is likely to expose a person or a group or class of persons to hatred or contempt", based on "race, colour, ancestry, place of origin, religion, marital status, family status, physical or mental disability, sex, sexual orientation, gender identity or expression, or age." This prohibition does not apply to private communications.

An individual or group who believe they have been the target of a hate publication can file a complaint with the British Columbia Human Rights Tribunal, which must hold a hearing into the complaint. If the Tribunal upholds the complaint, it can award remedies of a civil nature, which can include a monetary award of dignity damages. The Tribunal's decision is subject to judicial review by the British Columbia Supreme Court. Breach of the hate publications provision is not an offence.

==== Case under the Human Rights Code (B.C.) ====
In Khanna v Common Ground Publishing Corp., the British Columbia Human Rights Tribunal considered a complaint about an image on the cover of a magazine. The image was a representation of the Hindu god Shiva in the form of Nataraja. The representation had a circle of fire with modern artifacts, such as a hamburger. The Tribunal rejected the claim that the image would make it "acceptable for others to express hatred and contempt for Hindus."

=== Northwest Territories ===
The Human Rights Act of the Northwest Territories provides that no person is to publish or display any statement, notice, sign, emblem that is "likely to expose any individual or class of individuals to hatred or contempt" on the basis of a prohibited ground. The provision also states that it shall not be construed as interfering with the free expression of opinion on any subject. The Act defines "prohibited ground" to include: "race, colour, ancestry, discrimination nationality, ethnic origin, place of origin, creed, religion, age, disability, sex, sexual orientation, gender identity or expression, marital status, family status, family affiliation, political belief, political association, social condition and a conviction that is subject to a pardon or record suspension."

Any person or group of individuals who believes that they have been the target of a hate publication may lodge a complaint with the Northwest Territories Human Rights Commission. If the Commission concludes the complaint may have merit, it can refer the matter to an adjudicator appointed under the Act. The adjudicator shall conduct a hearing, and if the adjudicator concludes the complaint has merit, may order civil remedies, including damages for injurty to dignity and self-respect. An appeal lies from the adjudicator's decision to the Supreme Court of the Northwest Territories. A breach of the hate publication provision is not an offence.

=== Saskatchewan ===
==== Provisions of The Saskatchewan Human Rights Code ====
The Saskatchewan Human Rights Code, 2018 provides that no person is to publish or display any publication, statement, emblem or other representation that "exposes or tends to expose to hatred any person or class of persons on the basis of a prohibited ground." The provision also states that nothing in the section restricts the right to freedom of expression under the law on any subject. The "prohibited grounds" are defined to include religion; creed; marital status; family status; sex; sexual orientation; disability; age; colour; ancestry; nationality; place of origin; race or perceived race; receipt of public assistance; or gender identity.

An individual who believes they have been the target of hate publications can file a complaint with the Saskatchewan Human Rights Commission, which then investigates the complaint. If the Commission believes the complaint has merit, the Commission applies to the Saskatchewan Court of King's Bench for a hearing. If the King's Bench upholds the complaint, it can order remedies of a civil nature, which may include monetary damages for injury to dignity or self-respect. An appeal lies to the Saskatchewan Court of Appeal. Breach of the hate publication provision is not an offence.

==== Cases under The Saskatchewan Human Rights Code ====
===== Saskatchewan (Human Rights Commission) v Bell (c.o.b. Chop Shop Motorcycle Parts) (1994) =====
In 1991, the Saskatchewan Human Rights Commission applied for an injunction under the Code against a motorcycle parts shop, to prevent the sale of a series of stickers. The shop had been selling stickers which depicted caricatures of a person of Chinese origin, a person of East Indian origin and of the Sikh faith, and a Black person, all with the No symbol (a red circle and slash) superimposed on the caricatures. The Queen's Bench granted the injunction.

The shop owner appealed to the Saskatchewan Court of Appeal, which dismissed the appeal. The Court held that the stickers infringed the Code's prohibition on hate publication based on race and religion, and would tend to encourage others to engage in discriminatory practices against the members of the three groups. The Court acknowledged that the Code provision infringed the guarantee of freedom of expression set out in section 2 of the Charter, but held that the infringement could be justified under section 1 of the Charter, for the reasons given by the Supreme Court of Canada in the Taylor case.

===== Saskatchewan Human Rights Commission v Owens (2006) =====
In June 1997, Hugh Owens placed an advertisement in The Star Phoenix, the local newspaper in the city of Saskatoon. The advertisement gave the citations for four different passages from the Bible, and an illustration of two male stick figures holding hands, with a red circle and slash mark superimposed. The advertisement indicated that bumper stickers with the same text and images were available for sale. Three gay men, including Gens Hellquist, a local activist, filed complaints with the Saskatchewan Human Rights Commission against Owens and the publisher of the newspaper, alleging that the combination of the four bible passages and the image under the red circle and slash infringed the Code's prohibition on hate publications.

The Commission referred the complaint to a board of inquiry, which conducted an inquiry and heard evidence. Hellquist testified that the Bible passages indicated that homosexuals should be put to death. The board of inquiry held that the combination of the universal symbol for "not allowed" or "forbidden", coupled with the text of the four Bible passages, amounted to a breach of the Code provision. The board of inquiry applied the reasoning of the Court of Appeal in the Bell case and concluded that the Code provision did not infringe the Charter. The board of inquiry ordered Owens to pay damages of $1,500 to each complainant, and not place a similar advertisement in the future. It also held that the publisher was to pay $1,500 to each complainant, and not accept such advertisements in the future.

Owens appealed. The Court of Queen's Bench agreed with the board of inquiry and dismissed the appeal. Owens then appealed to the Court of Appeal. That Court allowed Owens' appeal. It held that the advertisement had to be considered in the context of the ongoing debate over sexual orientation which was occurring in the 1990s in Canada. As well, the image of the stickmen and the red circle and slash did not contain the same sort of caricature as was found in Bell to contribute to hatred. Third, the Bible passages, although blunt in isolation, had to be considered in the overall context of the Bible. Taking those factors together, the Court concluded that the advertisement did not infringe the Code.

Because the Owens case involved quotations from the Bible, it attracted considerable public attention.

===== Saskatchewan Human Rights Commission v Whatcott (2013) =====
In 2001 and 2002, Bill Whatcott, leader of a small group called the Christian Truth Activists, distributed four different flyers in Regina and Saskatoon that had controversial comments about homosexuals. Four individuals filed human rights complaints with the Commission against Whatcott, alleging that the flyers breached the Code. The Commission referred the complaints to the Saskatchewan Human Rights Tribunal. In 2005, the Tribunal ruled that flyers infringed the Code, because they characterized homosexuals as "sodomites and pedophiles" who prey on children. The Tribunal ordered Whatcott to pay damages to each of the four complainants, totalling $17,500, and ordered him to stop distributing the flyers.

Whatcott appealed the decision to the Saskatchewan Court of Queen's Bench, which dismissed his appeal. The Queen's Bench ruled that the contents of the pamphlets met the rigorous standard required by the earlier decisions of the Court of Appeal and the Tribunal correctly held that they violated the Code. Whatcott then appealed to the Saskatchewan Court of Appeal. That Court allowed the appeal and overturned the decisions of the Tribunal and the Queen's Bench. The Court held that the context of the flyers was important, namely that they dealt with issues of morality, and that anything that limits debate on the morality of behaviour is an intrusion on the right to freedom of expression.

The Commission then appealed to the Supreme Court of Canada. In its decision, Saskatchewan Human Rights Commission v. Whatcott, the Court unanimously upheld the constitutionality of the Code provision relating to hate speech and publications. However, the Court found that some of the language of the Code provision, relating to "ridicule, belittlement and affront to dignity" did not meet the strict standard required by section 1 of the Charter and was therefore unconstitutional. The provision was to be read as simply containing the prohibition on hatred. Applying the Code with that restriction, the Court found that two of the four pamphlets met the strict test of the Code, and two did not. It therefore allowed the commission's appeal, in part.

The decision generated considerable attention in the media and by legal commentators.

== See also ==
- Freedom of expression in Canada
- Censorship in Canada

== Bibliography ==
- Cohen, Maxwell. 1971. "The Hate Propaganda Amendments: Reflections on a Controversy". 9 Alberta Law Review 103.
- Rosen, Philip. [1985] 2000 January 24. "Hate Propaganda" (revised). Parliamentary Information and Research Service, Library of Parliament.
- Walker, Julian. 2018 June 29. "Hate Speech and Freedom of Expression: Legal Boundaries in Canada". Background Paper 2018-25-E. Library of Parliament. PDF.
