= Richard Warman =

Canadian politician

- Education: B.A., LL.B, LL.M
- Alma mater: Queen's University, University of Windsor, McGill University
- Known for: Legal and political activism, anti-racism, human rights issues

Richard Warman is an Ottawa-based lawyer who is active in human rights law. Warman worked for the Canadian Human Rights Commission (CHRC) from July 2002 until March 2004. He is best known as the primary instigator of actions related to Internet content under Section 13(1) of the Canadian Human Rights Act against people including white supremacists and neo-Nazis.

Warman wrote a detailed report on Internet hate in Canada for B'nai B'rith's Annual Audit of Antisemitic Incidents and has been the target of antisemitic smears himself, though he has testified in the past that he is not Jewish. He received the Saul Hayes Human Rights Award from the Canadian Jewish Congress in June 2007 for "distinguished service to the cause of human rights".

== Education ==
Warman holds a Bachelor of Arts in Drama from Queen's University, a Bachelor of Law from the University of Windsor, and a Masters of Law (LLM 2004) from McGill University.

== Legal activism ==
=== Human Rights Commissions ===
Warman has initiated a large number of complaints against groups and individuals, alleging violations of Section 13(1) of the Canadian Human Rights Act. He has been identified as the primary complainant under this provision. His targets include the Canadian Heritage Alliance and its leader Melissa Guille; Jason Ouwendyk and the Northern Alliance; Marc Lemire; Tomasz Winnicki; Alex Kulbashian and James Scott Richardson of the Canadian Ethnic Cleansing Team; Bobby Wilkinson and his Canadian Nazi Party; Craig Harrison; Terry Tremaine;Glenn Bahr, Peter Kouba, Jessica Beaumont and Ciaran Paul Donnelly, all formerly with the group Western Canada For Us; Liz Lampman; Fred Kyburz; and Eldon Warman. Warman is the only person who has successfully used Section 13 in the decade ending in 2011.

In addition to Kyburz and Eldon Warman, Warman also raised concerns about Wally Dove, another member of the Canadian detax movement who was attempting to use his qualifications as a Certified General Accountant (CGA) to promote unlawful tax evasion schemes. The Chartered General Accountants of Ontario later revoked Dove's CGA and obtained an injunction ordering him to stop claiming to be a CGA thereafter.

=== Freedom of speech ===
Warman was involved in preventing David Icke's public presentations in Canada and abroad. He shared his opinion with the British newspaper The Independent On Sunday: "He has taken all the conspiracy theories that ever existed and melded them together to create an even greater conspiracy of his own. His writings may be the work of a madman, or of a genuine racist. Either way they are very dangerous. There is an unpleasant anti-Semitic undertone in his work that must be brought to public attention. If he's unstable then so are his followers, who hang on his every word. What benefit can there be in allowing him to speak?"

=== Canadian Human Rights Tribunal ===
Warman has won ten of the cases he has brought before the Canadian Human Rights Tribunal (CHRT), and two more have been successfully mediated after the individuals had left the neo-Nazi movement and renounced their beliefs.

The CHRT has consistently upheld Warman's complaints against the following individuals and groups: Fred Kyburz; Eldon Warman; Alexan Kulbashian, James Scott Richardson and the Canadian Ethnic Cleansing Team, Affordable-space.com; Tomasz Winnicki; Craig Harrison (for postings on Marc Lemire's Freedomsite); Peter Kouba; Glenn Bahr and Western Canada for Us; Terry Tremaine.; Bobby Wilkinson and his Canadian Nazi Party; and Jessica Beaumont.

==== Warman v. Lemire ====
On September 2, 2009, in the case of Warman's complaint against Marc Lemire, Canadian Human Rights Tribunal member Athanasios Hadjis found Section 13 of the Canada Human Rights Act to be unconstitutional, as it infringed unjustifiably on the Canadian Charter of Rights and Freedoms' guarantee of freedom of expression. Hadjis thus declined to impose a penalty on Lemire. As Hadjis is not a judge and the tribunal is not a court, his decision does not carry sufficient weight to strike down the section as ultra vires. As a result, the ruling is not binding beyond Lemire. However, the Tribunal has suspended further hearings in some active cases while awaiting a higher court ruling in Lemire.

On October 1, 2009, the Commission appealed the decision in Lemire to the Federal Court. The Canadian government has chosen not to intervene in the Federal Court case, although it had defended the constitutionality of Section 13(1) before the Tribunal. In February 2014, the Federal Court of Appeal ruled against Lemire in a decision that found Section 13 to be constitutionally valid and reinstated the penalty section and the CHRT's cease and desist order against Lemire violating Section 13, regardless of the fact that by that point the section had already been repealed by parliament.

=== Case against neo-Nazi Bill White ===
Warman is also known for his attempt to have the Canadian Radio-television and Telecommunications Commission (CRTC) block access to two United States-based websites that included what Bernie Farber of the Canadian Jewish Congress described as a "murder warrant" against Warman by U.S. neo-Nazi Bill White. In refusing the initial ex parte application, the CRTC stated:

In the Commission's view, given the unprecedented nature of the relief sought in the Application and the serious and fundamental issues it raises, as well as the fact that the specific approval is being sought in favour of Canadian carriers without notice to such carriers, it would be inappropriate to consider granting the interim relief sought in the Application on an ex parte basis, and in particular without affording Canadian carriers and all other interested parties the opportunity to comment.

White was subsequently indicted by a U.S. grand jury for the death threats against Warman and others and remains in custody pending trial. The grand jury heard testimony from both Bernie Farber and Warman. Acting U.S. attorney Julia Dudley said some lines had clearly been crossed, as she announced the charges against Mr. White. "When freedom of speech turns into threats against innocent people, it is the responsibility of the law enforcement community to intervene and protect its citizens", she said.

=== Defamation suits ===
==== David Icke ====
Warman sued David Icke for libel, following the publication of Icke's book Children of the Matrix. Warman also sued the publishers and some distributors of the book. Warman requested that the Thompson-Nicola Regional District Library remove the book from its collection. Fearing litigation, the library complied with the request. British Columbia Library Association member Ann Curry commented that "in the Warman case, libraries had to comply with Warman's request or possibly face liability2. In 2004, the British Columbia government passed legislation to protect libraries from defamation suits if they distribute materials that can be considered defamatory. The lawsuit was settled in 2015 when Icke paid $210,000 in damages and legal costs and agreed to "immediately cease any further distribution of Children of the Matrix and remove the defamatory material from any future editions". Warman said: "This settlement exposes Icke's argument that no one had ever sued him because his allegations were true as nothing more than a fallacy". He added, "My reputation has been entirely vindicated. David Icke’s attacks against me were disgraceful and beyond the pale but he’s paid a heavy price for them and I trust this will never happen again".

==== Jason Ouwendyk and the Northern Alliance ====
Warman has also sued Jason Ouwendyk and his white supremacist group the Northern Alliance for libel. – a case that was suspended when Ouwendyk sought bankruptcy protection and agreed to pay Warman damages as part of his proposal to creditors

==== Paul Fromm and the Canadian Association for Free Expression ====
Warman sued Paul Fromm and his Canadian Association for Free Expression for libeling him in various Internet posts. On November 23, 2007, Ontario Superior Court Justice Monique Métivier ruled in Warman's favour and ordered Fromm to pay Warman $30,000 in damages, and to post full retractions within ten days on all the websites on which he posted the defamatory comments. Métivier found that Fromm posted statements about Warman "either knowing the fundamental falseness of the accusations he levelled at Warman, or being reckless as to the truth of these." The Ontario Court of Appeal upheld the judgement and added $10,000 in costs against Fromm and his group. The Supreme Court of Canada later refused to give them leave to appeal further and again awarded costs against Fromm and his group.

==== William Grosvenor ====
Warman was awarded $50,000 in damages in 2008 after a successful suit for defamation, assault, and invasion of privacy against Albertan William Grosvenor. Grosvenor had sent emails and made a variety of posts over the course of the two prior years following Warman's human rights complaint against Grosvenor. The posts variously threatened Warman, called for violence against him, and attempted to reveal where he lived. Warman would have pursued damages of $175,000, but waived the larger claim so that he could proceed under simplified rules of court.

==== National Post, Ezra Levant et al ====
In April 2008, Warman launched a libel suit against the National Post Company, National Post columnist Jonathan Kay, and Canadian bloggers - Ezra Levant, Kate McMillan and her blog Small Dead Animals, Kathy Shaidle and her blog Five Feet of Fury, Mark Fournier and Constance Wilkins-Fournier and their blog Free Dominion. The reason for the suit was that the newspaper, quoting an expert hired by Marc Lemire as part of his lawsuit with Warman, said that Warman was the author of a 2003 Internet post regarding Canadian Senator Anne Cools that used racist and sexist epithets. Warman denied that he was the author of the post and sued for libel damages from those who posted the information. The National Post and Kay apologized and retracted its statement and settled out of court with Warman. Levant, McMillan and Shaidle settled and publicly apologized on June 10, 2015. The apology posted on Levant's website read as follows:

In the past, I have made certain derogatory statements and comments about Mr. Richard Warman on January 20, 23 and 28, 2008 and November 10, 2008. Those statements and comments were made on my website at www.ezralevant.com.

Those statements and comments attacked the personal and professional reputation of Mr. Richard Warman. I retract and apologize to Mr. Warman for those statements and comments without reservation. In particular, in one of my website posts, I alleged that Mr. Richard Warman had posted a bigoted attack on the Internet against Senator Anne Cools. I have no evidence that this is true and I retract it and apologize to Mr. Warman for it without reservation. – Signed Ezra Levant

==== Mark and Connie Fournier and Free Dominion ====
The owners of Free Dominion were also sued in a second lawsuit brought by Warman. Also in 2008, Warman sued Mark Fournier, Connie Fournier and eight John Does for libel. As part of this case, Warman asked the court to order the Fourniers to release information which could assist in the identification of the eight John Does: their email addresses and IP addresses. Justice Kershman ordered them to do so. However, on appeal, the Superior Court overturned this decision unless Warman could prove a prima facie case against the John Does before their information was released.

On August 9, 2013, the case finally began with jury selection. After 10 days of testimony, the jury was charged. On October 2, 2013, the jury found in Warman's favour, awarding him $42,000 in damages, plus costs which were later set at $85,000. Free Dominion closed to the public as a result. On December 11, 2015, the Ontario Court of Appeal upheld the lower court's ruling and awarded Warman an additional $23,000 in costs.

==== Jonathan and Barbara Kay ====
Warman sued Jonathan Kay and his mother Barbara in small claims court for posting what Warman claimed were defamatory tweets alleging links between CAHN and the antifa movement in the United States. The court dismissed the lawsuit on November 10, 2022, stating that "CAHN did in fact assist Antifa and that the movement has been violent,” and ruling that it would be reasonable to state that it is not a "good look" for a human rights organization to support a violent movement. The judge went on to condemn Warman for what the judge described as "us[ing] litigation to silence or intimidate those he sees as his critics, or who oppose his methods of prosecuting hate groups".

== Political activism ==
Warman ran as a Green Party of Canada candidate in the 1997 federal election in the Windsor West riding, and in the 2000 federal election in Ottawa—Orléans, placing fifth on both occasions. He ran as the Green Party of Ontario candidate in the 1995 Ontario provincial election in Simcoe Centre, placing fifth, and in 1999 in Ottawa West—Nepean, placing fourth.

In 2006, Warman contributed to the Renewal Commission of the Liberal Party of Canada's Report on Human Rights. He is also one of the backers of the reward fund established by the Assembly of First Nations in relation to the Gatineau murder of Kelly Morrisseau.

== Death threats and violent rhetoric ==
In addition to the threats against him by Bill White, Warman was the subject of further death threats after Tomasz Winnicki was sentenced to nine months in prison for violating a court injunction. A federal court sentenced Winnicki to nine months imprisonment for contempt of court for breaking that injunction.

The threats included website Vanguard News Network's webmaster Alex Linder posting material inciting the murder of the Federal Court judge, employees of the Canadian Human Right Commission, and Warman (who had testified against Winnicki at the contempt of court hearing). Linder suggested on the main VNN website and in a VNN Internet radio broadcast that their killing would be a "genuine act of patriotism." Other individuals posted similar violent rhetoric to the VNN Internet forum. Both the main VNN website and the VNN forum were temporarily shut down on July 26, 2006, by their website hosting company's upstream provider, after being contacted about the threats.

== Praise and criticism ==
Journalist Don Butler of the Ottawa Citizen newspaper wrote in a front-page profile of Warman:

Part of [Warman's] motivation comes from having relatives who fought Nazis in the Second World War. "It's really a betrayal of the veterans and all those who contributed in World War II to ignore the ongoing threat from these groups that are seeking to resurrect an idea that should have died 60 years ago in a bunker in Berlin."
He also feels it's incumbent on him as a lawyer to repay the investment society made in his education by working for the societal good. Ignoring the problem, he insists, would be "betraying my duty to the profession."
"It's imperative that individuals and groups take steps as strong as they can to defend human rights in Canada," he says. "Because if they're not defended, they get undermined. Eventually they get worn down through disuse. I could never bear to see that happen."
Anti-Semitism and racism, he argues, are a community problem and need to be treated as such. "There's never been a history of genocide that hasn't been preceded by demonization."

Butler also reported:

"He's had an enormous impact," says Michael Geist, the Canadian research chair in Internet and e-commerce law at the University of Ottawa. "In a sense, he's got the mechanics of how we deal with online hate up and running. It's fair to say no one has been as effective or persistent." The result is a body of jurisprudence that leaves little doubt Canadian law applies to online hate speech that originates in this country. The decisions, says Geist, "have sent a clear warning to those who engage in hate speech that this is not a no-law land."

Blogger and former magazine publisher Ezra Levant, who is being sued by Warman and others for libel, has argued that Warman's actions as a plaintiff before the Canadian Human Rights Commissions are tantamount to censorship in the name of human rights. Levant also says the Warman's libel lawsuits generally are "nuisance suit[s]" that are part of Warman's "maximum disruption" policy.

Maclean's, which had been the subject of an unrelated human rights complaint concerning hate speech, has reported that "Richard Warman says he's fighting hate. Critics say free speech is the real victim." That article included commentary or allegations that

...[T]he slam-dunk quality to Warman's Section 13 cases are a cause for worry, symbolizing the drift of human rights commissions into the boggy territory of covert investigation and speech control. Those concerns deepened two weeks ago with revelations that, for a time, Warman was acting both as a complainant and an investigator at the commission. Even after he left in 2004, he seemed to enjoy easy access to commission offices, stopping by to chat with staff or get documents printed. ... Of the fact Warman and investigators were going online undercover, [Keith] Martin says simply, "That's appalling."

The CHRT criticized Warman in March 2009 for having posted pseudonymously — using the names Axetogrind and Pogue Mahone — to neo-Nazi sites such as Stormfront and Vanguard News Network, as if in agreement with racist and antisemitic messages posted there. In one post, in response to a comment in January 2005 about American neo-Nazi leader Jeff Schoep, Warman wrote, "Keep up the good work Commander Schoep!". The CHRT ruled that Warman's posts, which he initially denied were his, could have precipitated further hate messages from forum members, stating same to be "both disappointing and disturbing and it diminishes his credibility".; The CHRT therefore did not prescribe any penalties beyond a cease-and-desist order against Mr. Ouwendyk.

Warman said his posts had helped him identify members of the neo-Nazi movement and that at the time there was no "road map" for such investigations. "With hindsight, he said, "things might have been done differently today."
