= Ethical Oil =

Book by Ezra Levant

Ethical Oil: The Case for Canada's Oil Sands
- Author: Ezra Levant
- Language: English
- Publisher: McClelland & Stewart
- Publication date: 2010
- Publication place: Canada
- Pages: 261
- ISBN: 0-7710-4641-3
- OCLC: 437081482

Ethical Oil: The Case for Canada's Oil Sands is a book written by Canadian talk-show host and political activist Ezra Levant, which makes a case for exploiting the Athabasca oil sands and its sister projects in Alberta. Published in 2010 by McClelland & Stewart in Toronto, Ontario, Canada, the book became a non-fiction best seller and won the National Business Book Award for 2011.

In the 261 page book, Ezra Levant makes the case that in terms of four criteria (the environment, conflict, economic and social justice and freedom from oppression) the Canadian petroleum industry is "heads above other crude producers like Saudi Arabia, Libya, Nigeria and Venezuela". Highlighting perceived hypocrisy from Western progressive and environmental movements, the author confronts what he sees as unfair and excessive criticism of oil sands, stating that the "oil sands are not perfect, and criticizing them is fair game. But why has criticism of the oil sands been so disproportionately loud compared to criticism of other, larger, more disturbing sources of oil?".

Ethical Oil: The Case for Canada's Oil Sands has popularized the concept of "ethical oil" as a neologism, giving ammunition to the Conservative government of Stephen Harper and providing the inspiration behind Alykhan Velshi's "EthicalOil" campaign in the United States and Canada.

The Economist called Ethical Oil a "polemical defence of the tar sands."

== Background ==
Oil sands in Alberta have a proven reserve of 170 billion barrels (2.7×10^{10} m^{3}), the second largest proven reserves of crude oil in the world. They have become the largest source of oil imported into the United States. With significant economic development and investment into the oil sands, the industry has been enjoying strong support by both the province's government and the federal government. However, the industry has also been subject to criticism due to the environmental impacts of bitumen exploitation. While the industry has attempted to resolve these issues by developing new techniques, such as in situ extraction, environmental organizations, such as Greenpeace, have launched campaigns to delegitimize the resource, based on its greenhouse gas emission records.

Canada's primary export market, the United States, has been ambivalent to the environmental questions surrounding the exploitation of the oil sands, with Republicans being generally more supportive of the resource, while president Barack Obama, a Democrat, said that "there are some environmental questions about how destructive they are".

In an attempt to refocus the debate, Ezra Levant, a conservative political activist and former publisher of the Western Standard, examines the ethical aspects of importing oil from countries where political oppression and human rights violations are prevalent, and argues that oil sands production from Canada should be considered the only true ethical alternative to OPEC oil exports. His inspiration for the concept of 'ethical oil' came from the neologism 'conflict diamond', and its antonym 'conflict-free diamond'. Levant decided to write the book to change some minds, after realizing at the 2009 Ottawa International Writers Festival in Ottawa that he was the "token Alberta whipping boy" during a panel on the oil sands, and ineffective at convincing the audience of the merits of the oil sands. Ezra Levant stated that he wrote the book from a liberal point of view, in order to appeal to those who reject the traditional conservative point of view.

== Content ==
The book is divided into 12 chapters, with a prologue, an epilogue, acknowledgments and sources. Chapters deal with various topics, including an overview of the biggest oil producing countries, an account of the controversy over Talisman Energy's involvement in Sudan, a critical analysis of some ethical funds, a case about inconsistencies in Greenpeace activism, a rebuke of the cancer controversy in Fort Chipewyan, the implication of Middle-Eastern regimes in the anti-Oil sands movement, and a critical analysis of the green jobs arguments.

A recurring theme throughout Ethical Oil: The Case for Canada's Oil Sands is the perceived hypocrisy of Western environmental movements. In a chapter entitled "Greenpeace's Best Fundraiser Ever", Levant notes the disparities between the harsh criticism of the Canadian energy industry coming from Greenpeace Canada to the seemingly absent criticism of Chinese industrial activity (such as nuclear power) from Greenpeace China, arguing that it is much easier to criticize free and liberal democracies than to criticize controlling regimes, but also raising the question of funding, noting that China, the most populated country on Earth, is a very attractive fundraising market for Greenpeace (which Levant describes as a 'multinational corporation').

== Reviews ==
Andrew Brannan reviewed the book in The Objective Standard, and noted that it provides a "barrage of evidence in moral defense of the oil sands producers", while Peter Foster, a Financial Post columnist, suggested that Levant "not only exposes the lies and hypocrisy of the media-coddled opponents of the vast resource, but raises the uncomfortable question of what alternatives to the oilsands these moralists prefer". On the other hand, David Suzuki, dismissing Levant as an "apologist", argued that "the logic is faulty. Just because a country or society is considered 'ethical' does not mean everything it produces or exports is ethical". In the Winnipeg Free Press, John Collins, a retired union negotiator, criticized some of Levant's sources, noting the presence of the Canadian Association of Petroleum Producers in the footnotes, while Patrick Brethour, an editor for The Globe and Mail writing in the Literary Review of Canada, contends that the title of Levant's book "is a considerable misstatement" and that Levant "fails to make the case for ethical oil".

== Reactions ==
A January 1, 2011 article in The Economist described Ezra Levant as the "author of a recent polemical defence of the tar sands". The article cites Ethical Oil's statement that "Americans would rather buy from Canada than from Venezuela and the Middle East." At that time, The Economist said that the United States would "remain the world's biggest oil buyer for decades" with foreign supplies growing—not decreasing—in importance.

=== Support ===
Ezra Levant's work gave ammunition to the Conservative government, which adopted the neologism in a similar rhetoric. Stephen Harper, Prime Minister of Canada from 2006 until 2015, was quoted as saying that it is "critical to develop that resource in a way that's responsible and environmental and the reality for the United States, which is the biggest consumer of our petroleum products, is that Canada is a very ethical society and a safe source for the United States in comparison to other sources of energy." Danielle Smith, leader of Alberta's Wildrose Alliance, echoed Levant's arguments during a speech at the Fort McMurray Chamber of Commerce.

In 2011, Alykhan Velshi, a former staffer for Minister of Immigration Jason Kenney left government service and founded a website to promote the ideas put forward by Ezra Levant in his book. He subsequently returned as the Director of Planning for the Prime Minister's Office later in 2011. The website, EthicalOil.org launched a campaign to compare Canada's 'Ethical Oil' against OPEC's 'Conflict Oil' and features controversial advertisements comparing conditions for women, gays and other minorities in OPEC countries to those in Canada. EthicalOil.org has staged counter-protests in response to opposition to the Keystone XL pipeline project. Velshi left Ethical Oil in the fall of 2011, and was replaced by law student and former junior Conservative staffer Kathryn Marshall.

=== Criticism ===
Among critics of the 'Ethical Oil' point of view is Andrew Nikiforuk, author of Tar Sands: Dirty Oil and the Future of a Continent (Greystone Books, 2008, ISBN 1-55365-407-2), who referred to Levant's reasoning as "a classic Republican ruse", and dismissed Minister of the Environment Peter Kent's argument as an "infomercial on bitumen". In The Guardian, Leo Hickman points out that China is a major investor in the Canadian oil sands, and asks "Shouldn't this now mean that Canada's tar sands are labelled as 'Conflict Oil', too?" Another opponent, Megan Leslie, the environment critic for the Official Opposition's New Democratic Party, said the debate surrounding the ethics of Canadian oil sands "misses the point" and maintained that "Canada should be working to move beyond fossil fuels toward renewable sources of energy".

CBC's The Current held a debate on the merits of the ethical oil argument in Dec 2011. Nobel laureate and chair of the Nobel Women's Initiative Jody Williams, argued that the ethical oil position was disingenuous and suspect of commercial interests rather than genuine concern for women's rights. She argued that the oil industry with no history of advocating the case of women's rights, is ill placed to begin the discussion. Ethical Oil spokesperson Kathryn Marshall responded that the ethical nature of oil production needs to be discussed, and she expected human rights activists to be more inclined to promote dialogue. Dr. Andrew Crane a business ethics professor at York University agreed the ethical argument for oil production should be discussed, but also added the narrow focus of the books argument was prioritizing human rights over other ethical evaluating factors. Dr. Crane further stated that Canada was not taking a leadership position by trying to improve ethical extraction practices overseas and not just in Canada. He argued a primary ethical indicator is leadership, and companies operating in Canada, and Canadian companies operating abroad were not being held accountable within the ethical oil argument for their overseas practices. Kathryn Marshall responded the focus should be on the pushing these "unethical" countries for regulatory action, rather than the pushing the companies to improve in the absence of a regulatory impetus.
