= Terry Tremaine =

Canadian white nationalist and neo-Nazi

Terrence Cecil Tremaine (born July 20, 1948 in Regina, Saskatchewan) is the founder and national director of the National-Socialist Party of Canada. He is a white nationalist organizer who has posted on white nationalist web forums such as Stormfront and other websites using the screen name "mathdoktor99", and on other websites as "JCMateri".

== Background ==
Tremaine holds a B.A. in Mathematics (with a minor in Philosophy) from the University of Regina and a M.Sc. in Mathematics from Concordia University in Montreal, Quebec. From 1983 he was a part-time lecturer in mathematics and statistics at a number of universities, including the University of Saskatchewan. Tremaine was terminated from his position at the University of Saskatchewan in April 2005 following a complaint.

== Human rights complaint ==
On April 8, 2005, Richard Warman filed a complaint to the Canadian Human Rights Commission regarding Tremaine, alleging he "engaged in a discriminatory practice on the ground of religion, national or ethnic origin, race and colour, in a matter related to the usage of a telecommunication undertaking" in violation of the Canadian Human Rights Act. In late April the University of Saskatchewan, where Tremaine had been working as a sessional lecturer in Mathematics, received a complaint about his posting. As a result, Tremaine was let go by the university.

In response to the complaint to the commission, Tremaine wrote a letter of apology “expressing regret for his postings, indicating that he was deeply ashamed of them, and apologizing to the Jewish community.” Tremaine later began posting on Stormfront once again.

In August 2006, Tremaine appeared before the Canadian Human Rights Tribunal in Ottawa, represented by Paul Fromm. At the hearing Tremaine repudiated his apology and emphasized that he was a National Socialist. On September 13, 2006, Fromm requested "that the case be re-opened to allow him to make a motion requesting that the complaint of Mr. Richard Warman be dismissed because of a poisoned environment and harassment on him, as representative of the Respondent, Terry Tremaine." This motion was denied on October 17, 2006.

On February 2, 2007, the Canadian Human Rights Tribunal ruled that the complaint that Tremaine, "engaged in a discriminatory practice on the ground of religion, national or ethnic origin, race and colour, in a matter related to the usage of a telecommunication undertaking" had been substantiated. Tremaine was ordered to pay a fine of $4000.00 and to, "cease the discriminatory practice of communicating telephonically or causing to be communicated telephonically... material... that are likely to expose a person or persons to hatred or contempt by reason of the fact that that person or persons are identifiable on the basis of a prohibited ground of discrimination, contrary to section 13(1) of the Canadian Human Rights Act."

As a result of an investigation that began in June 2006, Tremaine was arrested January 23, 2008, and charged with promoting hate on the Internet. In some of his postings Tremaine, who refers to himself as a "white nationalist", characterizes Jews as, "'parasites' and 'vermin,' and called for the expulsion of Jews and non-white people from Canada" as well as posting on Internet forum that, "blacks are intellectually inferior to whites" and "Hitler was a lot nicer to the Jews than they deserved."

In March 2009, Tremaine was charged with contempt of court for violating the 2007 court order prohibiting him from posting racist material on the Internet. The charges were in response to an affidavit filed by Warman stating the Tremaine had continued to post material disparaging to immigrants and Jews. After hearing the matter, Justice Harrington "reluctantly" concluded that Tremaine was not in contempt of the federal court. Even though Tremaine had "deliberately flaunted an order of the Canadian Human Rights Tribunal", the Commission had failed to provide adequate notice that its decision had been registered with the Federal Court. This was determinative because the Tribunal has no procedure for contempt, and so Tremaine could only be held in contempt if the decision was registered with the Federal Court. The fact that he had not been notified of that registration meant that he had not deliberately violated an order of the Federal court.

On August 6, 2009, Tremaine was arrested and held without bail.

In 2012, Tremaine was sentenced to 30 days in jail for contempt of court for posting racist messages on social media in violation of a court order. In 2014, he lost his appeals and was ordered to serve his sentence.

== National-Socialist Party of Canada ==
The National-Socialist Party of Canada (NSPC) is a neo-Nazi group founded by Terry Tremaine in 2006. Despite its name, it is not a registered political party in Canada. It is unknown how many members the group has. Tremaine is the respondent in a complaint to the Canadian Human Rights Tribunal by lawyer Richard Warman. The NSPC is affiliated with the United States–based National Socialist Movement.
