= Tomasz Winnicki (political activist) =

Polish-Canadian white supremacist

- Born: November 17, 1975 (age 51); Poland
- Occupation: White supremacist activist

Tomasz Winnicki (born November 17, 1975) is a Polish-Canadian white supremacist based in London, Ontario. He was the subject of complaints before the Canadian Human Rights Tribunal for his activities, and has also faced criminal charges on weapons offences. In July 2006, he was sentenced to nine months in prison for violating a Federal Court injunction barring him from posting hateful material on the Internet. In 2010, he ran unsuccessfully in the London mayoral election, garnering around 0.2% of the municipal vote.

== Background ==
Winnicki and his family immigrated to Italy from Poland in 1985, before immigrating to Canada in 1987.

== Internet activities and legal proceedings ==
Winnicki was an active poster on Alex Linder's Vanguard News Network web forum. He originally posted under the pseudonym Thexder_3D before using his legal name once publicly identified. Following his online publications, Ottawa human rights lawyer Richard Warman filed complaints against Winnicki with the Canadian Human Rights Commission. Winnicki and his counsel, Chi-Kun Shi, raised constitutional challenges against section 13(1) of the Canadian Human Rights Act, arguing it infringed upon freedom of expression under section 2(b) of the Canadian Charter of Rights and Freedoms; the Tribunal dismissed the challenge based on Supreme Court precedent. Hearings took place in August and October 2005, with final arguments concluded on December 12, 2005.

On October 4, 2005, the Federal Court of Canada granted an interlocutory injunction barring Winnicki from posting hate propaganda pending the Tribunal's decision. Justice Edmond de Montigny wrote: "Having looked at these messages in their entirety and in context, I have no doubt that they are likely to expose persons of the Jewish faith to hatred or contempt... and the same can be said of the messages which target persons of the black race. They are undoubtedly as vile as one can imagine and are not only discriminatory but threatening to the victims they target."

In April 2006, the Canadian Human Rights Tribunal issued its decision (Warman v. Winnicki, 2006 CHRT 13), determining that Winnicki's messages were "vicious and dehumanizing." The Tribunal issued a permanent cease-and-desist order, fined Winnicki $6,000 under the Canadian Human Rights Act, and ordered him to pay $5,500 in special compensation to Warman for retaliatory harassment.

Winnicki was simultaneously subject to contempt of court proceedings for violating the October 2005 injunction by continuing his online postings. In July 2006, the Federal Court sentenced him to nine months' imprisonment for contempt. After serving 83 days, Winnicki was released on bail in autumn 2006 pending appeal. The Federal Court of Appeal heard the matter on January 16, 2007; while it upheld the finding of contempt, noting court orders must be followed during appeal, it varied the sentence to time served. Winnicki faced criticism from within white supremacist factions for retaining Chinese-Canadian attorney Chi-Kun Shi for his defence.

== Protests ==
In addition to his online activities, Winnicki has attended a number of political protests in London, Ontario, where he resides with his mother, and in other cities. In September 2004, Winnicki and three others were stopped by the police as they were driving to a Toronto rally in support of Holocaust denier Ernst Zündel. He was charged with carrying a concealed weapon, possessing weapons at a public meeting, and possession of a weapon for a dangerous purpose, after police found throwing knives, a bow and arrows, and body armour in his vehicle. Winnicki pleaded guilty to weapons charges on November 23, 2006, receiving a conditional discharge with 6 months of probation.

== 2010 mayoral candidacy ==
In October 2010, Winnicki stood as a candidate in the London mayoral election. The election was ultimately won by Joe Fontana, who received 47.2% of the votes cast; Winnicki gained around 0.2% of the vote.
