= Peter Kouba =

Canadian neo-Nazi

Peter Kouba was one of the co-founders of the now defunct Alberta-based white nationalist group Western Canada for Us (WCFU). Kouba, along with Glenn Bahr started the group in February 2004. The WCFU was formally dissolved by Bahr on May 11, 2004 after his apartment was raided and racist paraphernalia seized by the Edmonton Hate Crimes unit.

== Career ==
Soon after the WCFU was formed, Bahr forced Kouba out of the group due in part to ideological differences. Kouba felt that openly displaying Nazi symbols hurt the group's ability to attract new members. Bahr, a committed neo-Nazi, rejected this argument. There was also contention about Kouba's proposed "Whiteville", a plan to buy rural property in order to create an all-white community, which Bahr considered unrealistic. As a result of the acrimony between the two men which spilled onto Stormfront, Kouba, who posted as proud18, was banned from posting messages.

On May 2, 2004, Bahr appeared on the Peter Warren Show to promote the WCFU. During the program Kouba called in using the pseudonym "Richard" and proceeded to divulge information about Bahr, including the username he used on Stormfront and the Blood & Honour forums, SS-88.

=== Accusations and ousting ===
In September 2004, both Kouba and Bahr became subjects of a human rights complaint made by Richard Warman. Kouba was accused of making a number of discriminatory comments about First Nations peoples, religious minorities, East Asians, Roma, and Pakistanis that could expose these groups to hatred and/or contempt. On November 22, 2006, the Canadian Human Rights Tribunal ordered Kouba to "cease the discriminatory practice of communicating over the Internet, material of the type that was found to violate s. 13(1) in the present case, or any other matter of a substantially similar content that is likely to expose a person or persons to hatred or contempt by reason of the fact that that person or persons are identifiable on the basis of a prohibited ground of discrimination" and to pay a fine of $7500.00.

After his ouster from and the dissolution of the WCFU, Kouba created a website that offered certificates for $19.99 that would guarantee the holder would go to heaven. For pets, the offer was for $14.99. However, homosexuals were not eligible for these indulgences.
