= European-American Unity and Rights Organization =

White nationalist organization

- Founded: 2000; 26 years ago
- Founders: David Duke
- Type: White nationalism
- Location: United States
- Region served: United States
- Key people: David Duke

The European-American Unity and Rights Organization (EURO) is an American organization founded in 2000, and led by former Grand Wizard of the Knights of the Ku Klux Klan, David Duke. The group has been described as white nationalist and white supremacist.

Initially, it was to be called the National Organization for European-American Rights (or NO FEAR), until the use of the name was legally challenged by No Fear Inc. The group was one of the original signatories of the 2004 New Orleans Protocol, a mostly US-based alliance of white nationalist and white supremacist groups.

== Ideology ==
The statement of principles sets out eight main goals for the organization, which are as follows:

- Equal rights for White Americans, particularly through an end to affirmative action.
- An end to desegregation busing, which they blame for declining educational standards, increased racial tension, and the wasting of public money.
- Welfare reform that would see welfare recipients made to work for their money, and the encouragement of family planning.
- Tougher sentencing for violent crime, alongside the repealing of hate crime legislation.
- Very strict limitations on immigration.
- An end to media portrayal of whites as oppressors.
- The preservation of white heritage.
- A demand for excellence in all things.

The main areas of activity for EURO are Louisiana, South Carolina and Mississippi, with other groups active in the south.

In an October 2007 website article the author wrote (commenting on what he called Hitler's "workers paradise") "The beautiful Germany of the 1930s with blonde children happily running through every village has been replaced with a multi-racial cesspool. Out of work Africans can be seen shuffling along the same streets, which used to be clean and safe in the days of the National Socialists. One day, people in Germany will grow tired of the politically correct police state that is destroying their lives. They will recover their national pride and start speaking the truth about their past regardless of what the militant lesbians or thought police tell them. Once that happens, Germany may finally be a great nation again - free of foreign control."

== Activities ==
In 2006 the group's ex-leader in Idaho Stan Hess courted controversy when he ran unsuccessfully for election to the North Idaho College Board of Trustees. His campaign focused on what he described as "the European American human rights movement", with Hess advocating the establishment of a European American Studies programme and the designation of a "European American Heritage Month" in October. According to an article in the Spokesman Review "he said he severed ties with the group about a year ago. Started by Ku Klux Klansman David Duke, Hess said the group's ties to the KKK concerned him and that he found it difficult to work within a large organization. He served as president of the organization's California chapter prior to moving to North Idaho in 2003."

== 2014 controversy ==
The group gained wider coverage in December 2014 when Steve Scalise, the Republican Majority Whip in the House of Representatives, said that in 2002, while a member of the Louisiana State Legislature, he had addressed a EURO meeting. A CNN report said that "Scalise, 49, who ascended to the House GOP's third-ranking post this year, confirmed through an adviser that he once appeared at a convention of the European-American Unity and Rights Organization, or EURO. But the adviser said the congressman didn't know at the time about the group's affiliation with racists and neo-Nazi activists."

Kenny Knight, who helped organise the 2002 meeting for David Duke and described as "friendly" with Scalise by Duke, stated that Scalise actually spoke to Knight's "Jefferson Heights Civic Association" in a room booked for the EURO meeting but before the meeting. The existence of the "Jefferson Heights Civic Association" was questioned in the Louisiana newspaper The Advocate which said "Multiple people familiar with Jefferson Parish's myriad civic associations, including past presidents of the Civic League of East Jefferson, also have said over the past week that they had never heard of such a group" and that "the organization does not appear on the parish's list of neighborhood groups, an informal but lengthy resource on the parish's website." Duke criticised the attacks on Scalise, stating that the name EURO sounded innocuous, saying also that "It would seem to me that he would have realized that it was our group, because he knew Kenny. I mean, he knew me. But I can't swear to it. When you're running around different places and talking to events you're invited and you just see a name and you've got three or four others to do and you don't have anyone to vet them, that's possible."

Politifact stated "There's no evidence Scalise was an "honored guest" at the EURO event as White, the Louisiana blogger, alleged. But Scalise has admitted he spoke to the group and has not denied other details published by White, while also claiming he does not remember attending" and "From the evidence, we know Scalise attended ... something. Whether it was a gathering of white supremacists or a civic meeting right before is unclear."

== See also ==
- List of white nationalist organizations
