= Ezra Levant =

Canadian media personality and conservative activist

- Levant in 2026
- Born: Ezra Isaac Levant; February 20, 1972 (age 54); Calgary, Alberta, Canada
- Education: University of Calgary; University of Alberta
- Occupations: Political commentator; columnist; lawyer
- Known for: Founding the Western Standard and Rebel News
- Notable work: Ethical Oil
- Political party: Reform (1997–2000); Alliance (2000–2001); Conservative (until 2011)
- Awards: National Business Book Award (2011); Queen Elizabeth II Diamond Jubilee Medal (2012)

Ezra Isaac Levant (born February 20, 1972) is a Canadian media personality, political activist, writer, broadcaster, and former lawyer. Levant is the founder and former publisher of the conservative magazine, the Western Standard. He is also the co-founder, owner, and CEO of the far-right media website Rebel News. Levant has also worked as a columnist for Sun Media, and he hosted a daily program on the Sun News Network from the channel's inception in 2011 until its demise in 2015.

Levant rose to prominence in 2006 after publishing the Jyllands-Posten Muhammad cartoons in the Western Standard, which led to a protracted legal battle with the Alberta Human Rights Commission regarding hate speech legislation and freedom of speech. The complaint against Levant was ultimately withdrawn. In February 2015, Levant co-founded Rebel News with Brian Lilley; Lilley left Rebel News in 2017 citing lack of editorial standards. Under Levant, Rebel News has been described as a platform for the anti-Islamic ideology known as counter-jihad.

Levant self-identifies as a libertarian conservative. He has been identified by others as belonging to the Canadian far right. Levant has expressed support for the Canadian petroleum industry and for fracking. In 2011 and 2014, Levant was successfully sued for libel, with the court in each case compelling a compensatory payment in the five digits.

== Early life and education ==
Levant was born to an Ashkenazi Jewish family in Calgary, Alberta. His great-grandfather emigrated to Canada in 1903 from Russia to establish a homestead near Drumheller, Alberta. Levant grew up in a suburb of Calgary. He attended the Calgary Hebrew School in his childhood before transferring to a public junior high school.

Levant campaigned for the Reform Party of Canada as a teenager and joined it as a university student. From 1990 to 1993, while at the University of Calgary, his two-person team won the "best debating" category in the Inter-Collegiate Business Competition held at Queen's University. The first two of those years, his debate partner was future Calgary mayor Naheed Nenshi. He has subsequently accused Nenshi, who is Ismaili, of "anti-Christian bigotry" as mayor.

In 1994, he was featured in an article in The Globe and Mail on young conservatives after accusing the University of Alberta of racism for instituting an affirmative action program of hiring women and Indigenous professors. After his actions outraged Indigenous law students, feminists, and a number of professors, Levant was called to a meeting with the assistant dean who advised him of the university's non-academic code of conduct and defamation laws. As head of the university's speakers committee, Levant organized a debate between Doug Christie, a lawyer known for his advocacy in defence of Holocaust deniers and accused Nazi war criminals, and Thomas Kuttner, a Jewish lawyer from the New Brunswick Human Rights Commission.

Levant was invited to write a guest column for the Edmonton Journal and interviewed on television. He spent the summer of 1994 in Washington, D.C., in an internship arranged by the libertarian Koch Summer Fellow Program. In 1995, he worked for the Fraser Institute and wrote Youthquake, which argued for smaller government, including privatization of the Canada Pension Plan. Levant saw "youthquake," the term he used to describe what he identified as a conservative youth movement of the 1990s, as similar to the 1960s civil rights movement. In his eyes, instead of being enslaved by racism, his generation was "enslaved by debt", and in order to liberate itself, society needed to dismantle elements such as trade unions, the minimum wage, universal health care, subsidized tuition, and public pension plans.

== Career ==
=== In law ===
Levant was called to the Bar in 2000 and began practising law, working in a law firm for less than two years, but ceased his practice c. 2003 in order to pursue interests in politics and the media. Though a non-practising lawyer, he maintained his membership in the Law Society of Alberta until 2016 when he resigned. Levant had been the subject of 26 complaints to the Law Society since 2004 as a result of his public statements and political activities. 24 of the complaints were dismissed and the final two were pending when he resigned.

=== At the Western Standard ===
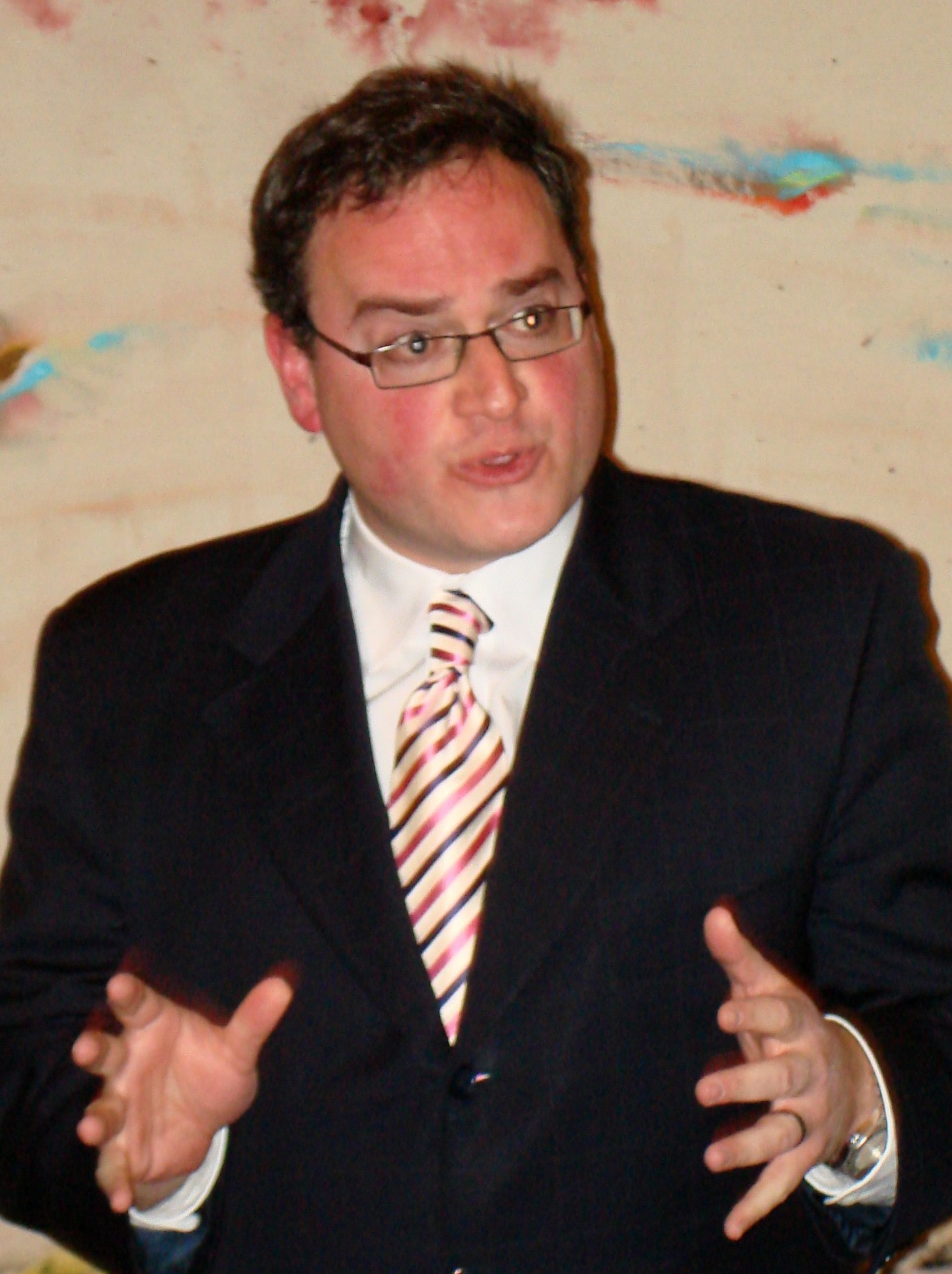
Levant in 2008

In 2004, Levant co-founded the Western Standard, an Alberta-based magazine with an emphasis on Western Canada and political conservatism. In October 2007, the magazine ceased publication of its print edition after failing to become profitable, becoming an online magazine. Levant later sold the publication's remaining assets to Matthew Johnson, the former legislative aide to Rahim Jaffer.

On February 13, 2006, the Western Standard published the Jyllands-Posten Muhammad cartoons depicting unflattering images of Muhammad. Syed Soharwardy, a Calgary Imam and president of the Islamic Supreme Council of Canada, complained about the publication to the Alberta Human Rights and Citizenship Commission.

On December 21, 2007, Soharwardy withdrew his complaint against the magazine when Johnston apologized directly and publicly to Soharwardy and Canada's Muslim community for publishing the cartoons.

Levant refused to apologize and a hearing was scheduled for January 2008. On the day of the hearing, Levant republished the cartoons on his personal website. At the request of Levant and his lawyers, Levant was allowed to videotape his interview with Shirlene McGovern, a human rights investigator with the Alberta Human Rights Commission. Levant later posted the videos on YouTube.

On February 15, 2008, Soharwardy announced he was withdrawing his complaint against Levant. He said in a guest column for The Globe and Mail that publishing the cartoons "was irresponsible and was intended to cause strife," but acknowledged their publication "may not fall outside the limits of free speech." In August 2008, the Alberta Human Rights and Citizenship Commission dismissed a similar complaint against Levant made by the Edmonton Council of Muslim Communities.

Levant described his experience with the Alberta Human Rights Commission in his 2009 book, Shakedown. In 2011, Shakedown was selected as Writers' Trust and Samara's "Best Canadian Political Book of the Last 25 Years" based on popular vote. Levant's battle with the Alberta Human Rights Commission has been cited as having contributed to the 2012 repeal of Section 13 of the Canadian Human Rights Act.

In a January 2015 interview with Maclean's that was done shortly after the Charlie Hebdo shooting in Paris, Levant defended publishing the cartoons. He also criticized other media outlets for refusing to publish the cartoons or the material at Charlie Hebdo.

=== As lobbyist and promoter ===
From 2009 until 2010, Levant worked as a lobbyist for Rothman's Incorporated, a manufacturer and distributor of tobacco products, and for Achieve Energy Services Limited Partnership, part of the Alberta oil and gas industry.

In March 2010, Levant accompanied fellow conservative personality Ann Coulter on a Canadian speaking tour. Her speech at the University of Ottawa was canceled at the last minute, apparently by its organizers, because of what Levant claimed was "physical danger to Coulter and the audience" from protesters. The Ottawa Police later disputed any claims of unrest or violence.

In 2010, Levant published the book Ethical Oil, which won the 2011 National Business Book Award. Levant's 2014 book, Groundswell: The Case for Fracking, was a finalist for the 2015 National Business Book Award.

=== As columnist ===
Levant wrote an irregular column for the Calgary Sun for ten years, until he was dropped in October 2007 because of "internal decisions." He continued to write occasional columns for the National Post on a freelance basis until 2010.

In 2010, Levant joined Sun Media as a columnist and was given an on-air position on its Sun News Network as host of The Source, an evening talk show, when that channel launched in April 2011. In 2012, during his tenure at Sun News, Levant received the Queen Elizabeth II Diamond Jubilee Medal. On February 13, 2015, Sun News Network was shut down, hence terminating The Source. His column for QMI/Sun Media ended at the same time.

=== At Rebel News ===
Following the closure of Sun News Network, on February 16, 2015, Levant launched The Rebel website as a corporate endeavour with a YouTube channel for videos produced by himself, Brian Lilley and other former Sun News Network personalities. Levant argued his online production would be unencumbered by the regulatory and distribution challenges faced by the Sun News Network. He also said lower production costs would make it more viable. A crowdfunding campaign raised $100,000 for the project.

Lilley quit the Rebel on 12 August 2017, following coverage of the Unite the Right rally in Charlottesville, Virginia, by Faith Goldy, who was later fired by Levant. Lilley said he had become uncomfortable with what he felt was an "increasingly harsh tone" when The Rebel discussed topics such as immigration or Islam. He also accused The Rebel of exhibiting a "lack of editorial and behavioural judgment that left unchecked will destroy it and those around it."

In 2017, The Rebel was repeatedly the object of controversy, including advertising boycott campaigns in Canada and the UK, the loss of several well-known contributors, and the cancellation under pressure of a planned Caribbean cruise featuring The Rebel personalities. As of February 20, 2022, The Rebel Media had more than 1.56 million subscribers on its YouTube channel.

== Legal disputes ==
=== Ron Ghitter ===
In 1998, Levant wrote a Reform Party fundraising letter in which he criticized Alberta Progressive Conservative Senator Ron Ghitter. Ghitter sued for defamation and in 2000, Canadian Alliance MP Rob Anders and Levant admitted liability and issued a formal apology and undisclosed damages to settle the suit. The apology stated, "Our attack on Senator Ghitter was unfounded and we now admit having defamed Senator Ghitter. We further acknowledge that some of our statements were based on facts that were false."

=== George Soros ===
In September 2010, Levant wrote a column for Sun Media accusing George Soros of funding avaaz.org, a group lobbying to stop Sun Media being granted a licence for Sun TV News Channel, and strongly attacking Soros's character and history by alleging that as a child he collaborated with the Nazis. Soros threatened to sue Sun Media for libel and on September 18, Sun Media issued a retraction and apology to Soros.

=== Giacomo Vigna ===
On 18 November 2010 and 26 January 2011, the Ontario Superior Court ruled that Levant was to pay Giacomo Vigna, a Canadian Human Rights Commission lawyer, $25,000 and $32,500, respectively.

Levant accused Vigna of lying to the Canadian Human Rights Tribunal, tampering with evidence, and suggested he'd been fired ... Justice Robert Smith ruled that Levant "spoke in reckless disregard of the truth and for an ulterior purpose of denormalizing the Human Rights Commission across Canada which makes his statements malicious in that sense."

At the 2010 hearing, Levant was ordered to pay $25,000 to Vigna and to remove the libellous materials from his website. At the subsequent hearing, Vigna argued for more compensation to cover his lawyers' fees and Levant was ordered to pay an additional $32,500.

=== Khurrum Awan ===
Ezra Levant was successfully sued for libel by lawyer Khurrum Awan. According to his statement of claim and records of court proceedings, Awan claimed that Levant's blog writings had repeatedly described him as being: "Khurrum Awan the liar", "stupid, a "fool", "serial, malicious, money-grubbing liar", "unequivocally implied that he was an anti-Semite and perjurer". Awan states that Levant also stated that Awan believes it is permissible to lie to further the cause of Islam. Awan claimed that as a result, he has "suffered mental distress, humiliation and loss of professional reputation." In his statement of defence, Levant replied that "any damage to Mr. Awan's reputation was self-inflicted." Levant declined comment but in an email described Awan as a "master of lawfare" who was engaged in "an exceedingly political lawsuit."

Levant launched a website "Stand With Ezra" to support and fundraise for his defence, claiming that this and other lawsuits against him are affronts to Charter rights to free expression, describing them as "nuisance" suits and politically motivated attempt to silence him which "add to the price of freedom in Canada."

However, Levant himself sued a Calgary alternative newspaper and conservative activist Merle Terlesky for $100,000 jointly for publishing a letter by Terlesky which questioned Levant's spending as publisher of the Western Standard and alleged that "Ezra looks for any opportunity to poke a Muslim in the eye." Levant's statement of claim said that he "has been lowered in the estimation of right-thinking members of society generally, and has been seriously injured in his credit, character and reputation and has been brought into public scandal, odium and contempt, and has suffered damages," including damage to his "reputation as an entrepreneur." The suit was settled by an apology and paying Levant $5,000. Levant distinguished the two suits by saying that Terlesky made "a false, factual claim" and Levant's motivation in suing was not political. "It wasn't an attempt to stop him from doing what he does as a living or a sideline. It was to correct a potentially devastating, bizarrely specific allegation of fraud on my part."

In her judgment against Levant, Judge Wendy Matheson of Ontario Superior Court ruled there is "ample evidence before me demonstrating express malice on the part of [Mr. Levant]", especially the fact he "did little or no fact-checking regarding the posts complained of, either before or after their publication". She found "that [Mr. Levant's] dominant motive in these blog posts was ill will, and that his repeated failure to take even basic steps to check his facts showed a reckless disregard for the truth". Levant "ought to have been aware of the serious ramifications of his words on the reputation of this law student. Yet, at trial, he repeatedly tried to minimize his mistakes and his lack of diligence." The judge ordered Levant to remove the posts from his website within 15 days and pay Awan $50,000 in general damages plus $30,000 in aggravated damages.

The Ontario Court of Appeal dismissed Levant's appeal of the judgment on December 22, 2016, and ordered him to pay a further $15,000 in costs with all three judges on the panel ruling unanimously against Levant. On June 8, 2017, the Supreme Court of Canada denied Levant's application for leave to appeal, with costs.

=== Richard Warman ===
Lawyer Richard Warman filed suit against Levant in 2008 as well as Kathy Shaidle, Kate McMillan of Small Dead Animals and several other conservative bloggers for libel over statements made about Warman on Free Dominion. Levant says this "lawsuit isn't logical, or serious. It's a nuisance suit."

On June 10, 2015, Levant, Shaidle, and McMillan settled with Warman and published retractions and apologies. Levant's apology was posted on his website and read:

In the past, I have made certain derogatory statements and comments about Mr. Richard Warman on January 20, 23 and 28, 2008 and November 10, 2008. Those statements and comments were made on my website at www.ezralevant.com. Those statements and comments attacked the personal and professional reputation of Mr. Richard Warman. I retract and apologize to Mr. Warman for those statements and comments without reservation. In particular, in one of my website posts, I alleged that Mr. Richard Warman had posted a bigoted attack on the Internet against Senator Anne Cools. I have no evidence that this is true and I retract it and apologize to Mr. Warman for it without reservation.

=== Canadians for Justice and Peace in the Middle East ===
A statement of claim for defamation was filed against Levant by Canadians for Justice and Peace in the Middle East (CJPME) on December 22, 2016. The group alleges that Levant defamed them by comparing them to Nazis and calling them "Jew-baiters" over their campaign in support of Boycott, Divestment and Sanctions against Israel due to that country's treatment of Palestinians. CJPME is seeking $100,000 in damages and $20,000 for punitive or exemplary damages. In its statement of claim, CJPME asserts that BDS "is not a criticism or attack on Jewish people or upon any person because of their religion or ethnicity", and that the group "decries hatred, violence, racism and religious targeting of Jewish people in Canada and throughout the world". The lawsuit was settled in 2020.

=== Robert Day and Adam Stirling ===
Levant filed lawsuits, in June 2016, against Twitter users Adam Stirling and Robert Day for tweeting comments that alleged that not all money raised by Rebel Media's crowdfunding campaign for victims of the 2016 Fort McMurray wildfire were going to the Canadian Red Cross, as Levant had promised, and for claiming Levant had lied by promising that donors would be issued with tax receipts. Levant is suing Day and Stirling individually for $95,000 in damages each.

Day filed a motion to have the case dismissed under Ontario's anti-SLAPP legislation, arguing that Levant's suit was an attempt at lawfare intended to silence critics.

=== Farhan Chak ===
During a February 2014 broadcast of The Source, Levant stated that political science professor and former Liberal Party candidate Farhan Chak had "shot up" an Edmonton nightclub when he was 19 years old.

The accusation stemmed from a 1993 shooting incident at Barry T's nightclub, resulting in Chak being charged with firing a shotgun at nightclub employees. Chak was later found not guilty. Levant also publicized the incident in a 2007 Western Standard blog post questioning whether Chak was "a nut with a gun."

Chak filed suit against Levant and in 2021, was awarded $60,000 in damages by the Court of Queen's Bench of Alberta. In her decision, Justice Shaina Leonard ruled that Levant's comments were not malicious, but "careless" and "salacious." Leonard further questioned why the accusations about Chak "were included in the Broadcast at all," since the show itself was about human rights commissions, a topic unrelated to Chak or the charges.

=== Steven Guilbeault ===
In March 2021, Levant sued Environment Minister Steven Guilbeault for blocking Levant on the social media platform Twitter on his individual account. Levant claimed that Guilbeault's account was not a personal account but was functionally an official government account, and therefor should be accessible as a matter of freedom of expression. In September 2023, a settlement was reached where Guilbeault would unblock Levant as long as he remains a member of Parliament, and the government would pay Levant $20,000 for legal expenses.

== Canadian Broadcast Standards Council rulings ==
=== Chiquita complaint ===
The Canadian Broadcast Standards Council (CBSC) determined that while hosting The Source in 2011, Levant violated the CBSC's Code of Ethics by using a Spanish vulgarity on air (Sun News CBSC Rulings). The violation of the Code occurred on December 22, 2011, when Levant, in a commentary on The Source, blasted Chiquita Brands International and its ethical record after the company stated it would discontinue using oil produced from the Alberta oil sands. Speaking in Spanish, Levant told Chiquita executive Manuel Rodríguez, a Hispanic, "chinga tu madre" ("go fuck your mother"). The CBSC received 22 complaints about Levant's use of the slur, a few noting that it is one of the nastiest insults in the Spanish language. Though Sun News and Levant went on to argue that the phrase can have several meanings, Levant later admitted he intended to use the term in its literal, most vulgar sense. With that, the CBSC determined in June 2012 that, though Levant had his right to criticize Chiquita and its management, his use of the Spanish vulgarity violated Clause 6 of the Code of Ethics, which requires "full, fair and proper presentation of news, opinion, comment and editorial" content; as a result, Sun News was required to issue an on-air announcement of the CBSC decision.

=== "Gypsy" comments ===
On September 5, 2012, Levant broadcast a commentary that he titled "The Jew vs. the Gypsies" on The Source, in which he accused the Romani people as a group of being criminals. Levant said, "These are gypsies, a culture synonymous with swindlers. The phrase gypsy and cheater have been so interchangeable historically that the word has entered the English language as a verb: he gypped me. Gypsies are not a race. They're a shiftless group of hobos. They rob people blind. Their chief economy is theft and begging. For centuries these roving highway gangs have mocked the law and robbed their way across Europe."

Following complaints, the Sun News Network removed the video from their webpage and issued an apology: "Two weeks ago on the Sun News program 'The Source' we looked at the issue of Canadian refugee claims by the Roma people. Following the broadcast we received a number of complaints from viewers who felt the broadcast reinforced negative stereotypes about the Roma people. We have completed a review of the material and we agree that this content was inappropriate and should not have gone to air. It was not the intent of Sun News, or anyone employed by Sun News, to promote negative stereotypes about the Roma people. We regret our error in these broadcasts, and we apologize unreservedly to the Roma people and to you, our viewers."

The Canadian Jewish Humanitarian and Relief Committee, founded by Avrum Rosensweig of Ve'ahavta, published an op-ed in the National Post which condemned Levant's commentary as a "contemptible screed" and argued that "[t]he time has come for all of us to reject hate and bigotry — against any group".

Gina Csanyi-Robah, executive director of the Roma Community Centre in Toronto, described the broadcast as "nearly nine minutes of on-air racist hate-speech targeting our community", "one of the longest and most sustained on-air broadcasts of hate-speech against any community in Canada that we've witnessed since our organization was established in 1997" and as "overtly racist, prejudicial, and demeaning." The centre filed complaints against Sun News with the Canadian Radio-television and Telecommunications Commission and the Canadian Broadcast Standards Council and against Levant with the Alberta Law Society as well as with the Toronto Police Service.

In March 2013, Levant apologized for his remarks, stating that "I attacked a particular group, and painted them all with the same brush. And to those I hurt, I'm sorry" and expressed hope that this "will serve as an example of what not to do when commenting on social issues."

Writing in the Toronto Star, Haroon Siddiqui reported that Csanyi-Robah claimed that the police and crown attorney had recommended hate charges be laid against Levant under the hate speech provisions in Section 319 of the Criminal Code. However, in a subsequent meeting, Csanyi-Robah and another individual claimed that the Attorney-General of Ontario's office declined to lay charges because of fears that the trial would become a "bit of a [media] circus".

The Canadian Broadcast Standards Council subsequently ruled, in September 2013, that Levant's broadcast was "in violation of the Canadian Association of Broadcasters' Code of Ethics and Equitable Portrayal Code," and that his comments about the Roma were "abusive and unduly discriminatory against an ethnic group, and violated other provisions of the [code] regarding negative portrayal, stereotyping, stigmatization and degradation." The council noted that Levant had already issued two on-air apologies, and as such, he would not be ordered to issue another.

=== Broadcasting inaccurate information ===
On January 23, 2013, Levant showed video of a protest that had occurred in front of the Sun News office in Toronto in which protesters objected to the Sun's coverage of the Idle No More movement. Levant replayed the clip on a subsequent show and proceeded to identify one couple by name claiming that they were "professional protesters". The couple subsequently contacted Sun to complain that it was not them in the clip, that they had not attended the protest nor even been in Toronto at the time and then complained to the Canadian Broadcast Standards Council when the Sun did not correct their story. "The CBSC's National Specialty Services Panel concluded that Sun News Network breached Clause 6 of the CAB Code of Ethics for including inaccurate information in the talk show. Levant had acknowledged his error on the February 8 episode of The Source."

== Political activism ==
=== Uniting the right ===
In 1996, Levant worked with David Frum to organize the "Winds of Change" conference in Calgary, an early attempt to encourage the Reform Party of Canada and Progressive Conservative Party of Canada to merge so that a united rightwing party could defeat the Liberal Party of Canada in the subsequent election. While unsuccessful, the conference anticipated future attempts at a Unite the Right movement which ultimately led to the formation of the Conservative Party of Canada in 2003. Levant supported Preston Manning's United Alternative initiative in 1999, a more advanced attempt to unite the country's conservative movement and was one of the leaders of the movement to create the Canadian Alliance as an attempt to broaden the party's base.

=== Political organizer and aide ===
While he was a law student, Levant was an active political organizer in the Reform Party, and guided the successful attempts by Rahim Jaffer (as the campaign manager for his nomination in Edmonton-Strathcona and later as his communications-director during the 1997 Federal Election) and Rob Anders to win party nominations. In 1997, he went to Ottawa to work for the Reform Party, becoming a parliamentary aide to party leader Preston Manning and being put in charge of question period strategy. Along with newly elected MP's Rob Anders, Jason Kenney and Rahim Jaffer, Levant was part of an up-and-coming group of young Reformers which pundits dubbed the "Snack Pack" due to their relative youth and obesity.

In 1999, after being dismissed as Preston Manning's legislative-assistant, Levant left Ottawa to join the editorial board of the fledgling National Post newspaper in Toronto. A close friend of Stockwell Day's son Logan, Levant proclaimed himself a "Stockaholic" and supported the elder Day in his successful attempt to defeat Reform Party leader Preston Manning for the leadership of the new Canadian Alliance.

In February 2001, he returned to Ottawa as communications director to Day. In May of that year he resigned after leaking to the National Post a letter that he sent to dissident MP Chuck Strahl in which he threatened to sue over Strahl's criticisms of his office.

=== Candidacy and resignation ===
Later in 2001, Levant returned to Calgary to practise law. By February 2002 he had won the Canadian Alliance party nomination for the riding of Calgary Southwest, but stepped aside after public pressure so that new party leader Stephen Harper could run there in a 2002 by-election. When the by-election was called, Levant, who said he spent over $150,000 to gain the nomination, announced on March 28 that he would not step aside. Later that night, however, he relented after widespread pressure from the party and accusations that he was putting himself ahead of the party. His campaign communication director was Pierre Poilievre, future Leader of the Official Opposition.

=== Organizing rallies ===
On December 4, 2016, Levant organized a political rally at the Legislature in Edmonton, Alberta, during which the crowd chanted 'lock her up', referring to Rachel Notley. Commentators were critical since Notley has never been accused of any crime. Commentators stated the rally imported the worst aspects of US politics into Canada.

=== Arrest at anti-Israel protest ===
On November 24, 2024, Levant was arrested by Toronto Police for "inciting" a crowd of anti-Israel protesters who had gathered in a Jewish neighbourhood centred around Bathurst Street and Sheppard Avenue in Toronto. Before being arrested, Levant had told the arresting officers that they were violating his Charter rights and that he "hadn't incited anything." After Levant resisted police orders to leave the immediate area, he was arrested and told that he was "breaching the peace." Levant announced that he intends to sue the Toronto Police.

== Political views ==
Levant has called himself a libertarian, saying he is "basically someone who believes in freedom," although he says he is more "mainstream conservative" when it comes to social issues and foreign affairs. He has said, "It's tough to be a pure libertarian, because reality has a way of messing with that beautiful theory."

=== Views on Quebec ===
Levant favoured Quebec sovereignty and a yes vote during the 1995 Quebec referendum in a Calgary Sun column titled "10 Reasons to Hope for a Yes Victory" Among his 10 reasons were Levant's views that the departure of Quebec from Canadian Confederation would lead to the elimination of bilingualism and multiculturalism, that it would give the Canadian government the "fortitude" to say no to "other special interest groups" such as First Nations and environmentalists; it would end corruption in Parliament, which Levant blamed on Quebec politicians, and clear the way for Preston Manning to become Prime Minister of Canada.

In 1996, Levant wrote a column saying that if the federal Liberals were re-elected, Alberta could separate from Canada, making it "free from Quebec's demands."

=== 2012 American presidential election ===
In a column on the eve of the 2012 presidential election, Levant wrote: "America is resilient. But four more years of Obama will change that country deeply — and not for the better." He urged readers to oppose President Obama's reelection. In the article, Levant stated of Obama that "alone amongst modern presidents he has not visited Israel during his presidency." National Post columnist Chris Selley accused Levant of "making up one of his patented 'facts'" and referred to a Washington Post article that noted most American presidents since Israel's founding in 1948 have not visited during their presidency; only Clinton and Carter visiting during their first terms. Levant predicted a Romney victory, with at least 295 electoral votes to 243 for Obama. He said that "every poll that shows Obama ahead in battleground states is equally skewed" and were biased in favour of Obama.

=== Stance against the Alberta Human Rights Commission ===
Levant is a fierce critic of the Alberta Human Rights Commission, particularly concerning Rev. Stephen Boissoin, who in the Lund v. Boissoin matter was fined $7,000 and banned from publicly "disparaging ... gays and lesbians" in May 2008. This case concerned a letter published by the Red Deer Advocate in 2002 in which Boissoin attacked the "homosexual agenda" as "wicked". In June 2008, Levant republished Boissoin's letter on his blog. When the AHRC dismissed the resulting complaint in November 2008, Levant accused the HRCs of religious discrimination, asserting that "100% of the CHRC's targets have been white, Christian or conservative" and that "It's legal for a Jew like me to publish [Boissoin's letter]. It's illegal for a Christian like Rev. Boissoin to publish it." The HRC's ruling was overturned by the Court of Queen's Bench of Alberta in 2009, on the grounds that Boissoin's remarks were not hateful. In 2012, the Court of Appeal of Alberta upheld the Court of Queen's Bench decision.

Levant's case has attracted the attention of organizations such as PEN Canada, the Canadian Association of Journalists, and the Canadian Civil Liberties Association — all of which have called for reform of the commissions. He was also featured on Glenn Beck's former show on CNN.

=== CBC opponent ===
Sun Media, owned by Quebecor, systematically opposed funding for the Canadian Broadcasting Corporation in an on-air campaign led by Levant and Brian Lilley.

=== Idle No More ===
On January 20, 2013, Idle No More protesters confronted Ezra Levant at the Toronto Sun office as part of a larger protest against Sun Media. They claimed Sun Media and Levant had a racist agenda and protested commentary made both in the Sun newspaper and on the Sun News Network about "the plight of Native Canadians, the funding of reserves, the Idle No More movement, and the ongoing hunger strike of Attawapiskat chief Theresa Spence." Levant responded to protesters saying he supports reforming the Indian Act, which he called racist. Levant later said the protesters were a 'rent a mob' who were paid to attend any protest.

== Bibliography ==
- Youthquake. Fraser Institute. 1996. ISBN 0-88975-167-6.
- Fight Kyoto: The plan to protect our economy. Essence Publishing. 2002. ISBN 1-55306-546-8.
- The War On Fun. Western Standard. 2005. ISBN 0-9739541-0-8.
- Shakedown: How our government is undermining democracy in the name of human rights. McLelland & Stewart. 2009. ISBN 978-0-7710-4618-6.
- Ethical Oil: The Case for Canada's Oil Sands. McLelland & Stewart. 2010. ISBN 978-0-7710-4641-4.
- The Enemy Within: Terror, Lies, and the Whitewashing of Omar Khadr. McLelland & Stewart. 2011. ISBN 978-0-7710-4621-6.
- Groundswell: The Case for Fracking. Signal. 2014. ISBN 9780771046445.
- Trumping Trudeau: How Donald Trump Will Change Canada Even If Justin Trudeau Doesn't Know It Yet. Rebel News. 2017. ISBN 9781542526203.
- The Libranos: What the Media Won't Tell You About Justin Trudeau's Corruption. Rebel News. 2019. ISBN 9780995016880.
- China Virus: How Justin Trudeau's Pro-communist Ideology Is Putting Canadians in Danger. Rebel News. 2020. ISBN 9781777198619.
