= Newfoundland School for the Deaf =

Location
- 425 Topsail Road; St. John's, Newfoundland and Labrador; Canada; 47.5326°N 52.7478°W

Information
- School type: Provincial School for the Deaf
- Founded: 1964
- Closed: 2010
- Grades: K-12
- Language: American Sign Language (ASL), English
- Website: www.nsd.nf.ca

The Newfoundland School for the Deaf was a provincial school in St. John's, Newfoundland and Labrador with both residential and day programs serving deaf and hard-of-hearing students.

The school taught both elementary and secondary students. Student population was approximately 10 students in the senior school and 20 in the elementary school, total is 30 students.

Deaf students from Canada often attend Gallaudet University in Washington, D.C., and Rochester Institute of Technology in Rochester, New York.

In August 2010, it was announced that the school would be closing as there would be no students attending in the upcoming school year, and none projected within the next five years; all the students in the province who were deaf or hard-of-hearing were in the public school system.
