= Kathy Shaidle =

Canadian writer (1964–2021)

- Born: 7 May 1964; Hamilton, Ontario, Canada
- Died: 9 January 2021 (aged 56); Ontario, Canada
- Occupations: Author, columnist, poet, blogger

Kathy Shaidle (7 May 1964 – 9 January 2021) was a Canadian author, columnist, poet and blogger. A self-described "anarcho-peacenik" in the early years of her writing career, she moved to a conservative, Roman Catholic position following the September 11 attacks, and entered the public eye as the author of the popular Relapsed Catholic blog. Citing some points of friction with Catholicism, Shaidle launched her own blog in 2007 called FiveFeetofFury. Her views on Islam, political correctness, freedom of speech, and other issues ignited controversy.

== Literary career ==
Born in Hamilton, Ontario, Shaidle studied at Sheridan College. Beginning in the mid-1980s she worked in Toronto, eventually taking up a post at the Catholic New Times magazine. In 1991, she left the publication to write full-time on government grants, only to discover a few weeks later that she had developed lupus erythematosus. Her four-year illness provided the subject matter for her 1998 essay collection God Rides a Yamaha.

In the early 1990s, Shaidle published two poetry chapbooks with the Toronto indie press Lowlife Publishing, which also published works by Lynn Crosbie and Maggie Helwig. Her book-length poetry collection, Lobotomy Magnificat was nominated for a 1998 Governor General's Award. Critic Wendy McGrath, writing in the Edmonton Journal, praised the poetry for how it "effectively relates sacred images or text to present day events and images." In contrast, the Montreal Gazette's reviewer was critical of the book's "diet of smart phrasing... and fabricated insights."

== Blogging ==
Shaidle wrote the blog Relapsed Catholic from 2000 to 2007 and a column for the Catholic weekly Our Sunday Visitor. She left the latter post in April 2007 after the newspaper refused to publish a column she had written criticizing Earth Day. In September 2007 she began a new blog, Five Feet of Fury. Shaidle also guest hosted and moderated the popular Canadian conservative blog, Small Dead Animals.

== Defamation ==
In 2008, human rights lawyer Richard Warman sued Shaidle, Ezra Levant, Kate McMillan of Small Dead Animals and the National Post over links to comments criticizing him at a Canadian internet forum, freedominion.ca. The National Post settled with Warman soon after the suit was launched and, in June 2015, Shaidle, Levant and McMillan all settled in exchange for undisclosed amounts and the issuance of public retractions and apologies.

== Other work ==
Also in 2008 Shaidle and journalist Pete Vere wrote and published The Tyranny of Nice, a critique of the Canadian human rights tribunals. Shaidle's writing also appeared in outlets such as FrontPage Magazine, Pajamas Media, Examiner.com and Taki's Magazine. She appeared on the Michael Coren Show, The Agenda (on TVO), the Charles Adler Show, The Political Cesspool, Vatican Radio, MSNBC, and Pajamas Media Radio. She was also on the board of advisors of the International Free Press Society.

== Awards and recognition ==
- 1998: poetry finalist, Governor General's Awards
- Canadian Church Press: four awards (humour, best national columnist, etc.)

== Death ==
Kathy Shaidle died on January 9, 2021, at the age of 56 from ovarian cancer.

== Bibliography ==
=== Poetry ===
- Gas Stations of the Cross. Toronto: Lowlife Publishing, 1990.
- Round Up the Usual Suspects: More poems about famous dead people. Toronto: Lowlife Publishing, 1992.
- Lobotomy magnificat, Ottawa: Oberon, 1997. ISBN 0-7780-1070-8 (hardcover), ISBN 0-7780-1071-6 (paperback).

=== Essays ===
- God Rides a Yamaha: Musings on pain, poetry, and pop culture., Northstone, 1998. ISBN 1-896836-24-0.
- A Seeker's Dozen: The 12 Steps for Everyone Else. CafePress, 2004. CafePress product number 10267680.
- A Catholic Alphabet: The Faith from A to Z. CafePress, 2005. CafePress product number 17385236.
- Acoustic Ladyland: Kathy Shaidle Unplugged. Lulu, 2007. Digital download only.

=== Nonfiction ===
- The Tyranny of Nice (co-authored with Pete Vere). Interim Publishing, 2008. ISBN 0-9780490-1-2.
