= Lund v Boissoin =

Hate speech case in Alberta, Canada

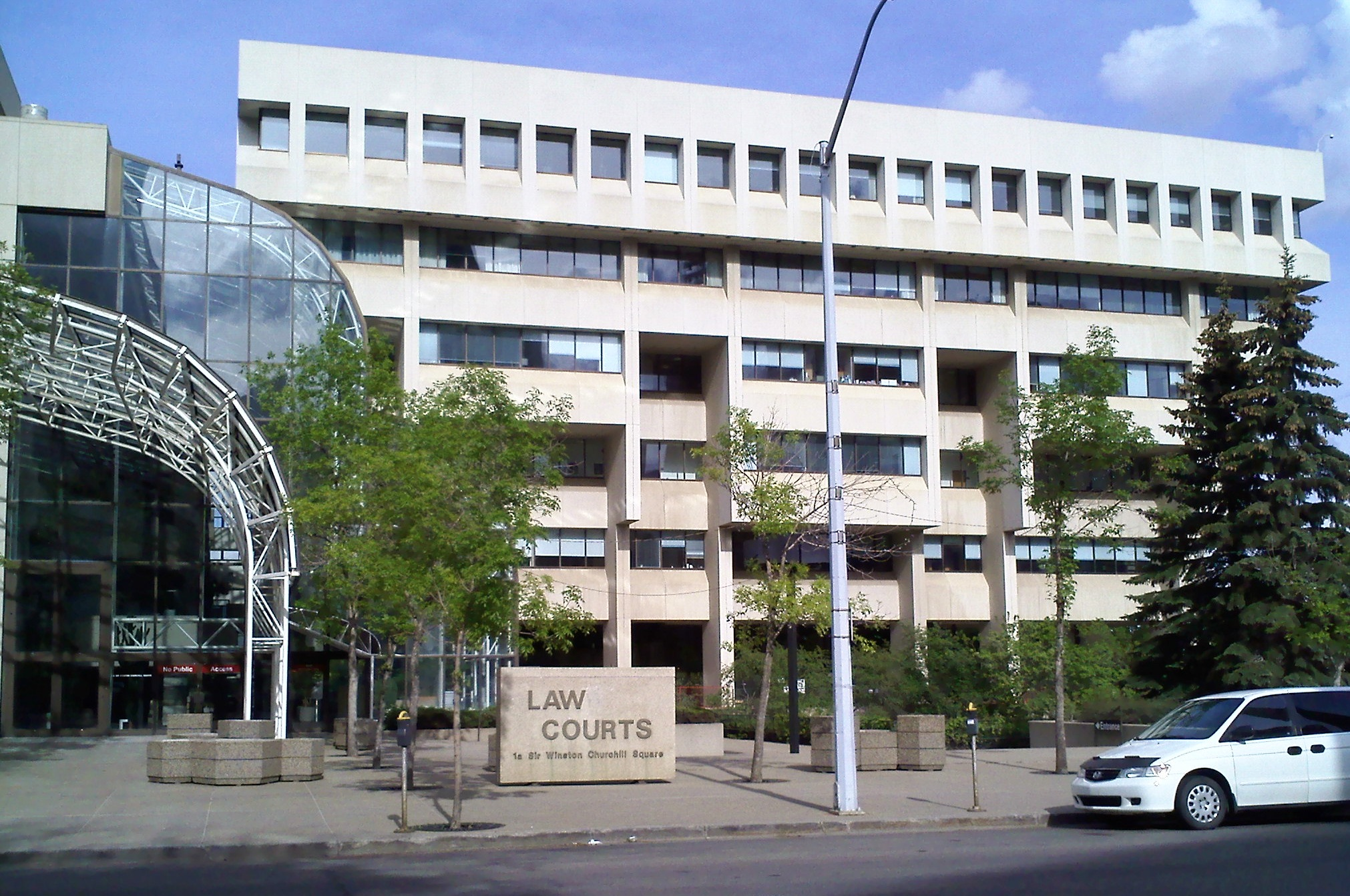
- The Law Courts, Edmonton
- Court: Court of Appeal for Alberta
- Full case name: Stephen Boissoin and the Concerned Christian Coalition Inc. v Darren Lund
- Decided: October 17, 2012
- Citations: Lund v Boissoin, 2012 ABCA 300

Case history
- Prior actions: Alberta human rights panel ruled Boissoin violated the Human Rights, Citizenship and Multiculturalism Act; panel's decision was overturned on appeal to the Court of Queen's Bench of Alberta.
- Appealed from: Court of Queen's Bench of Alberta

Court membership
- Judges sitting: Carole Conrad, Clifton O'Brien, Brian O'Ferrall

Case opinions
- Appeal dismissed; decision of the lower court upheld.
- Decision by: O'Brien J.
- Concurrence: Conrad, O'Ferrall JJ.

Lund v Boissoin is a court case in Alberta, Canada based on a June 2002 a letter to the editor from Reverend Stephen Boissoin published in the Red Deer Advocate on the subject of homosexuality. Dr. Darren Lund made a complaint about the letter to the Alberta Human Rights and Citizenship Commission. In 2008, a human rights panel ruled that the letter was "likely to expose homosexuals to hatred and/or contempt," ordering Boissoin to apologize to Lund and pay $5,000 in damages. Boissoin appealed to the Court of Queen's Bench of Alberta. In 2009, the Court of Queen's Bench overturned the Panel's ruling. In 2012, the Court of Appeal of Alberta upheld the Queen's Bench decision.

== 2002 letter to the Red Deer Advocate ==
In June 2002, Reverend Stephen Boissoin, Central Alberta Chairman of the Concerned Christian Coalition, sent a letter to the Red Deer Advocate. The letter said, "Where homosexuality flourishes, all manner of wickedness abounds". The letter claimed that "Homosexual rights activists and those that defend them, are just as immoral as the pedophiles, drug dealers and pimps that plague our communities."

The newspaper published the letter on 17 June 2002.

== Human rights complaint and litigation ==
=== Alberta Human Rights Panel ===
On 18 July 2002, Dr. Darren Lund, a professor at the University of Calgary, filed a complaint against Boissoin and the Concerned Christian Coalition with the Alberta Human Rights and Citizenship Commission, alleging that Boisson's letter constituted discrimination on the basis of sexual orientation, as prohibited by Alberta's Human Rights, Citizenship and Multiculturalism Act. A one-member Alberta Human Rights Panel accepted Lund's arguments that the letter was "likely to expose homosexuals to hatred and/or contempt." The Canadian Civil Liberties Association intervened in the case, condemning the views expressed in the letter but arguing they should not be subject to legal sanction.

On 30 May 2008, the Alberta Human Rights Panel ordered Boissoin and the Concerned Christian Coalition to refrain from publishing future disparaging remarks about homosexuals and provide Lund with a written apology and in $5,000 damages.

=== Court of Queen’s Bench of Alberta ===
Boissoin appealed the ruling to the Court of Queen's Bench of Alberta. On 3 December 2009, the Court overturned the decision of the Alberta Human Rights Panel. The Court found that the contents of the letter did not violate the Alberta Human Rights Act, and that the remedies which had been imposed were either unlawful or unconstitutional. The Court also identified "troubling aspects of the process leading to the decision of the Panel," including the inclusion of the Concerned Christian Coalition as a respondent.

=== Court of Appeal of Alberta ===
In March 2010, Lund appealed the Court of Queen's Bench ruling to the Court of Appeal of Alberta. In October 2012, the Court dismissed the appeal, ruling in favor of Boissoin. The Court agreed with the lower court that Boissoin’s letter was "a polemic on a matter of public interest and does not qualify as reaching the extreme limits... to expose persons to hatred or contempt," within the meaning of the Alberta Human Rights Act. The Court also stated that "it is not clear that Boissoin could have phrased the same purely political opinion in any more acceptable or polite way than he chose."

== Opposition from Ezra Levant ==
Journalist Ezra Levant was a fierce critic of the case and the provincial human rights commission. He republished Rev. Boissoin's letter verbatim, resulting in a complaint against Levant. When the Alberta Human Rights Commission dismissed the resulting complaint in November 2008, Levant accused the human rights commissions of religious discrimination, asserting that "100% of the CHRC's targets have been white, Christian or conservative" and that "It's legal for a Jew like me to publish [Boissoin’s letter]. It's illegal for a Christian like Rev. Boissoin to publish it. That's sick."
