= Small Dead Animals =

Canadian political blog

Small Dead Animals (SDA) is a Canadian blog, focusing largely on politics (Canadian, U.S., British and international) from a conservative perspective. Saskatchewan-based blogger Kate McMillan founded the blog and is the primary contributor.

Small Dead Animals was voted Best Canadian Blog in the Weblog Awards for 2004, 2005, 2006 and 2007. In 2008, SDA was narrowly voted Best Conservative Blog in North America over Ace of Spades HQ.

== Defamation ==
In 2008, human rights lawyer Richard Warman sued McMillan, Ezra Levant, Kathy Shaidle and the National Post over links to comments criticizing him at a Canadian internet forum, freedominion.ca. The National Post settled with Warman soon after the suit was launched and, in June 2015, Shaidle, Levant and McMillan all settled in exchange for undisclosed amounts and the issuance of public retractions and apologies. McMillan posted the following apology on her blog:

Apology to Richard Warman

Material previously appeared here in which a guest blogger made an allegation that Mr. Richard Warman had posted a bigoted attack on the internet against Senator Anne Cools. I have no evidence that this is true and I retract it and apologize to Mr. Warman for it without reservation.

— Kate McMillan

== Memorable phrases ==
=== The Libranos ===
McMillan coined the phrase "The Libranos" (a play on "liberal" and "Sopranos") to refer to the Liberal Party of Canada in light of the sponsorship scandal. A year later, a photograph of two Conservative MPs with a poster-sized version of a Western Standard cover based on her concept sparked a national controversy when Joe Volpe likened the MPs to Ku Klux Klan members.

== Coverage in media ==
Small Dead Animals has received some press coverage from the Toronto Sun, including:

- Publishing a letter from a soldier's widow after he died in a training exercise and the media became intrusive during and before the funeral.
- Commenting negatively on Alberta Progressive Conservative premier Ralph Klein's slide to the left.
- Criticizing a no-jail sentence for Paul Coffin, who was involved in the sponsorship scandal.
- Noting Celine Dion's choice of pronouns when discussing Hurricane Katrina on Larry King Live.

McMillan and some other Canadian bloggers provided commentary on the 2006 Canadian elections to the CBC and BBC News. SDA and McMillan have been mentioned on the floor of the Legislative Assembly of Saskatchewan.
