= Canadian Human Rights Tribunal =

Administrative tribunal in Canada

- Tribunal canadien des droits de la personne
- Established: 1977
- Composition method: Appointment by the Governor in Council on the recommendation of the minister of justice and attorney general
- Authorised by: Parliament of Canada via the Canadian Human Rights Act
- Appeals to: Federal Court
- Number of positions: 15

Chairperson
- Currently: Jennifer Khurana
- Since: 2021

The Canadian Human Rights Tribunal (French: Tribunal canadien des droits de la personne) is an administrative tribunal established in 1977 through the Canadian Human Rights Act. It is directly funded by the Parliament of Canada and is independent of the Canadian Human Rights Commission which refers cases to it for adjudication under the act.

The tribunal holds hearings to investigate complaints of discriminatory practices and may order a respondent to a complaint to cease a practice, as well as order a respondent to pay compensation to the complainant.

Decisions of the Canadian Human Rights Tribunal are reviewable by Canada's Federal Court. Federal Court decisions can then be appealed to the Federal Court of Appeal and the Supreme Court of Canada. The Federal Court can also issue and enforce decisions made by the tribunal if violations continue and imprison an offender for contempt of court if a decision continues to be disregarded. This has happened in the cases of John Ross Taylor in 1981 and Tomasz Winnicki in 2006.

== Chairs ==
The following individuals have served as Chair of the Canadian Human Rights Tribunal:

Name	Position	Tenure	Notes
Anne Mactavish	Chair	1998 – November 9, 2003	First recorded Chair
J. Grant Sinclair	Chair	November 9, 2003 – September 10, 2009	
Shirish P. Chotalia	Chair	September 10, 2009 – 2012	Implemented Access to Justice through customized hearing procedures focused on restorative justice; parties reported 94% satisfaction
David L. Thomas	Chair	September 2, 2014 – 2021	
Jennifer Khurana	Acting Chair	September 2, 2021 – March 24, 2022	Previously Vice-Chairperson
Jennifer Khurana	Chair	March 25, 2022 – present	Seven year term

== Significant Decisions ==
In June 2018, the Supreme Court of Canada found that the tribunal's determination that the Indian Act did not violate the Canadian Human Rights Act was reasonable due to judicial deference.

== See also ==
- Shiv Chopra
- Freedom of expression in Canada
- Human rights in Canada
- Section 13 of the Canadian Human Rights Act
- Universal Declaration of Human Rights
