= Fascism in North America =

Fascism, a far-right, authoritarian, and ultranationalist political ideology and movement, has a long history in North America, with the earliest movements appearing shortly after the rise of fascism in Europe.

== Canada ==
In Canada, fascism was divided between two main political parties, the Winnipeg-based Canadian Union of Fascists and the Parti national social chrétien, later renamed the Canadian National Socialist Unity Party. The Canadian Union of Fascists was modelled after the British Union of Fascists and it was led by Chuck Crate. The Canadian National Socialist Unity Party was founded by Adrien Arcand and it was inspired by Nazism. In English Canada, the Canadian Union of Fascists never gained the level of popularity that the Parti national social chrétien gained in Quebec. The Canadian Union of Fascists focused on economic issues, while the Parti national social chrétien concentrated on racist themes. The influence of the Canadian fascist movement reached its height during the Great Depression and declined from then on.

== Central America ==
As a minor movement, the Nazi Party was active among German immigrants in El Salvador, where the government cracked down on activity, and Guatemala, which outlawed the Nazi Party and the Hitler Youth in May 1939. They also organised in Nicaragua, although Falangism was more important, especially in the Colegio Centro América in Managua, where this brand of fascism flourished in the 1930s.

=== Costa Rica ===
The existence of figures who were sympathetic to Nazism in high political positions has been pointed out in the administrations of León Cortés Castro and Rafael Ángel Calderón Guardia. Cortés, being a presidential candidate and having spent some time in Nazi Germany, was publicly viewed as a sympathizer.

In the 1930s, a movement which was sympathetic to Nazism developed among a large community of Germans. Supporters of Nazism met in a local German Club.

During Calderón Guardia's presidency, Costa Rica declared war on the Third Reich, leading to the imprisonment of many German and Italian citizens and residents. Their properties were nationalized, despite the fact that the vast majority had no links with Nazism or Fascism. The doctrinal origins of racism and the allegations of European racial superiority in Costa Rica predated this event. For instance, Costa Rican scientist Clodomiro Picado Twight published racist writings that contributed to these ideologies.

=== Panama ===
The Central American leader who came closest to being an important domestic fascist was Arnulfo Arias of Panama who during the 1940s, became a strong admirer and advocate of Italian fascism following his ascension to presidency in 1940.

== Caribbean ==
Fascism was rare in Caribbean politics, both for the same reasons as those in Central America as well as due to the continuation of colonialism into the 1950s. However, Falangist movements have been active in Cuba, notably under Antonio Avendaño and Alfonso Serrano Vilariño, from 1936 to 1940. A Cuban Nazi Party was also active and attempted to change its name to the 'Fifth Column Party', but it was ultimately banned in 1941. As in Cuba, Falangist groups have been active in Puerto Rico, especially during World War II, when an 8,000 member branch came under FBI scrutiny.

== Mexico ==
In 1922, the Mexican Fascist Party was founded by Gustavo Sáenz de Sicilia. Italian fascists strongly disapproved of the new party, and in 1923, the Italian ambassador stated, "This party was not anything else than a bad imitation of ours".

The National Synarchist Union was founded in 1937 by José Antonio Urquiza. The group espoused some aspects of the palingenetic ultranationalism, a core tenet of fascism, as it aimed to bring about a societal rebirth, distancing itself from anarchism, communism, socialism, liberalism, Freemasonry, secularism and Americanism, which it believed was prevalent in Mexico. However, it differed from European fascism in that it was very Roman Catholic in nature. Although supportive of corporatism, the National Synarchist Union was arguably too counterrevolutionary to be considered truly fascist.

A similar group, the Gold Shirts, founded in 1933 by Nicolás Rodríguez Carrasco, also bore some of the hallmarks of fascism.

A Falange Española Tradicionalista was also formed in Mexico by the Spanish merchants who were based there and opposed the consistent level of support Lázaro Cárdenas gave to the Republicans during the Spanish Civil War. However, the group was peripheral because it did not seek to acquire any amount of influence outside this immigrant population. A Partido Nacional Socialista Mexicano was also active, with most of its 15,000 members having a German background.

A more modern group, the Nationalist Front of Mexico was founded in San Luis Potosí in 2006 by Juan Carlos López Lee. It strongly promoted the Reconquista ideology.

== United States ==
The origins of fascism in the United States date back to the late 19th century, during the passage of Jim Crow laws in the American South, the rise of the eugenicist discourse in the U.S., and the intensification of nativist and xenophobic hostility towards European immigrants. During the early 20th century, several groups were formed in the United States. Contemporary historians have classified these groups as fascist organizations; one of them being the Ku Klux Klan (KKK). During the 1920s, American scholars frequently wrote about the rise of Italian fascism under Benito Mussolini, but few of them supported it; however, Mussolini's fascist policies did initially gain widespread support among Italian Americans. During the 1930s, Virgil Effinger established the paramilitary Black Legion, a violent offshoot of the KKK that sought to establish fascism in the United States by launching a revolution against the federal government. Although it was responsible for a number of attacks, the Black Legion was small in size and ultimately petered out.

The rise of fascism in Europe during the interwar period raised concerns in the U.S. but European fascist regimes were largely viewed in a positive light by the American ruling class, including government officials, businessmen, and other members of the elite. This was due to the fact that fascist interpretations of ultranationalism allowed a nation to gain a significant amount of economic influence in the Western world and permitted a nation's government to destroy leftists and labour movements.

=== German American Bund (1936–1941) ===
Flag of the German American Bund (1936)

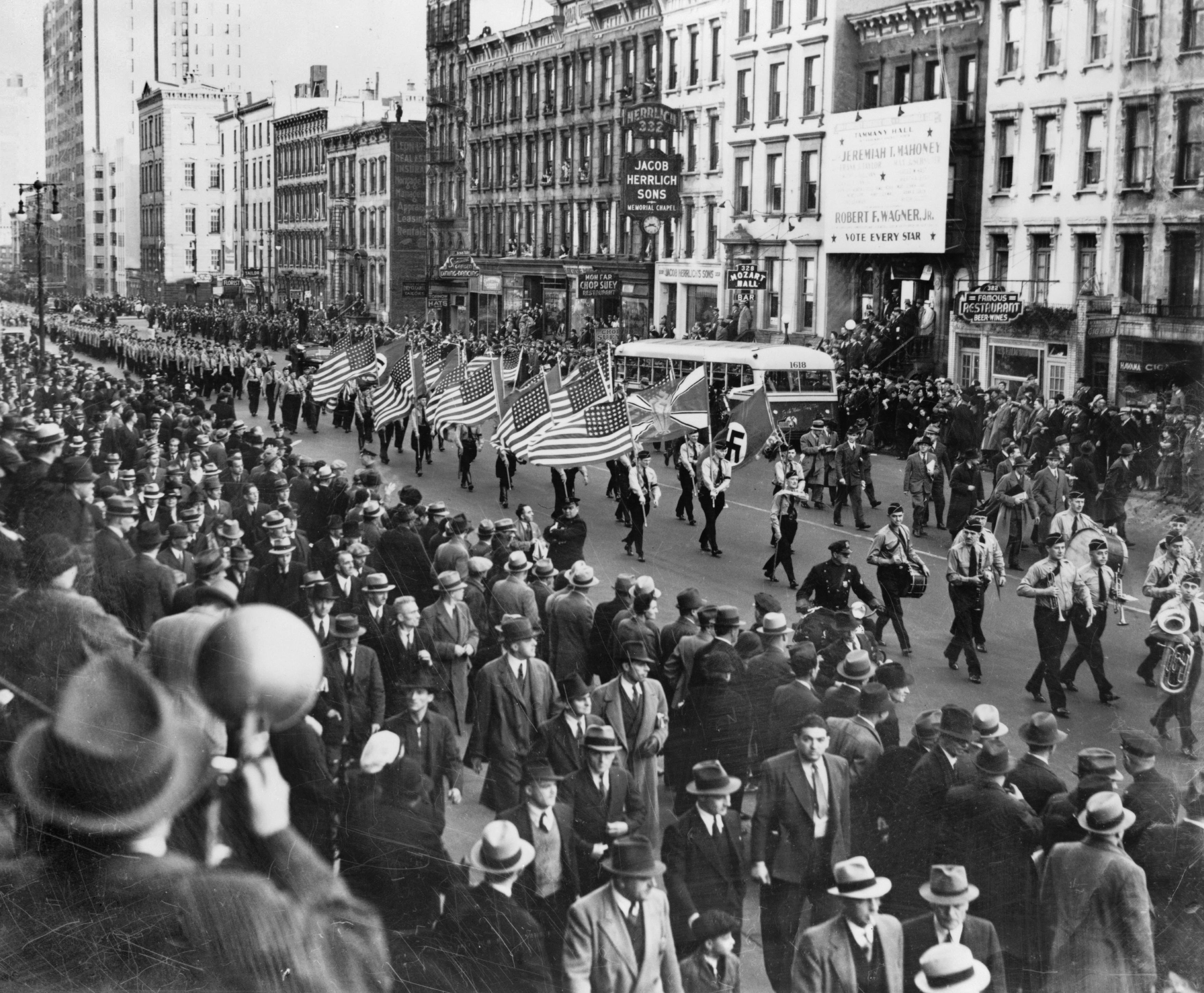
Bund parade on East 86th St., New York City (October 1939)

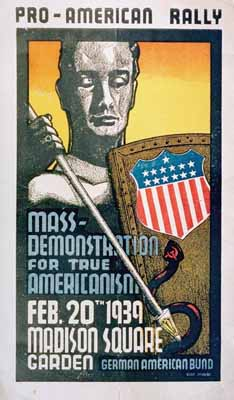
Poster for Bund rally at Madison Square Garden (1939)

The German American Bund was the most prominent and well-organized fascist organization in the United States. It was founded in 1936, following the model of Hitler's Nazi Germany. It appeared shortly after the founding of several smaller groups, including the Friends of New Germany and the Silver Legion of America, founded in 1933 by William Dudley Pelley and the Free Society of Teutonia. After March 1, 1938, membership in the German-American Bund was only open to American citizens of German descent. Its main goal was to promote a favorable view of Nazi Germany. The Bund was very active, providing its members with uniforms and encouraging participation in "training camps". The Bund held rallies with Nazi insignia and procedures such as the Hitler salute. Its leaders denounced the administration of President Franklin D. Roosevelt, Jewish-American groups, Communism, "Moscow-directed" trade unions and American boycotts of German goods. They claimed that George Washington was "the first Fascist" because he did not believe that democracy would work.

The high point of the Bund's activities was their rally at Madison Square Garden in New York City on February 20, 1939, with around 20,000 people in attendance. The anti-Semitic Speakers repeatedly referred to President Roosevelt "Frank D. Rosenfeld", calling his New Deal the "Jew Deal", as well as denouncing the supposed Bolshevik-Jewish American leadership. The rally ended with violence between protesters and the Bund's "storm-troopers". In 1941, the Bund was outlawed by the U.S. government, and its leader, Fritz Julius Kuhn, fled to Mexico.

=== World War II and "The Great Sedition Trial" (1944) ===
During World War II, Canada and the United States battled the Axis powers. As part of the war effort, they suppressed the fascist movements within their borders, which were already weakened by the widespread public perception that they were fifth columns. This suppression consisted of the internment of fascist leaders, the disbanding of fascist organizations, the censorship of fascist propaganda and pervasive government propaganda against fascism. In the U.S., this campaign of suppression culminated in "The Great Sedition Trial" of November 1944, in which George Sylvester Viereck, Lawrence Dennis, Elizabeth Dilling, William Dudley Pelley, Joe McWilliams, Robert Edward Edmondson, Gerald Winrod, William Griffin, and, in absentia, Ulrich Fleischhauer were all put on trial for aiding the Nazi cause, supporting fascism and isolationism. After the death of the judge however, a mistrial was declared and all of the charges were dropped.

=== Later years and the American Nazi Party (1959–1983) ===
In 1959, the American Nazi Party was founded by George Lincoln Rockwell, a former U.S. Navy commander, who was dismissed from the Navy due to his espousal of fascist political views. On August 25, 1967, Rockwell was shot and killed in Arlington by John Patler, a former party member who had previously been expelled by Rockwell due to his espousal of his alleged "Bolshevik leanings". The Party was dissolved in 1983.

=== Donald Trump and fascism ===
Some scholars have drawn comparisons between the political styles of Donald Trump and fascist leaders. Such assessments began during Trump's 2016 presidential campaign, and continued throughout the first Trump presidency as he appeared to court far-right extremists, including his attempts to overturn the 2020 United States presidential election after losing to Joe Biden, and culminating in the 2021 United States Capitol attack. Scholars have argued that core themes of Trump's foreign policy such as America First and Make America Great Again draw on the fascist ideas of national decline and rebirth and have normalized and legitimized eliminationist violence against racialized minorities and political opponents.

== Notable neo-fascist and neo-Nazi groups ==
=== United States ===
- American Freedom Party, formerly known as the American Third Position Party, founded by William Daniel Johnson in 2010.
- American Front: an umbrella organization.
- American Nazi Party: Founded by George Lincoln Rockwell in 1959, this group was central to the foundation of the World Union of National Socialists.
- Aryan Brotherhood: a prison gang.
- Aryan Freedom Network: a Texas-based neo-Nazi organization which espouses Christian Identity.
- Aryan Nations: a Christian Identity organization founded by Richard Girnt Butler.
- Aryan Republican Army: a Christian identity and white supremacist gang which robbed 22 banks in the Midwestern United States from 1992 to 1996.
- Atomwaffen Division: a neo-Nazi paramilitary terrorist organization which is infamous for its killing of 8 people, most notably, the murder of Blaze Bernstein.
- The Base (hate group): a neo-Nazi, white supremacist and militant accelerationist paramilitary hate group and training network, formed in 2018 by Rinaldo Nazzaro and active in the United States, Canada, Australia, South Africa, and Europe.
- Creativity Movement: a white separatist organization which espouses Creativity, an atheistic religion which espouses white supremacy.
- The Daily Stormer: an American far-right, neo-Nazi, white supremacist, misogynist, Islamophobic, antisemitic, and Holocaust denial commentary and message board that is named and modeled after the Nazi German tabloid Der Stürmer and advocates a second genocide against Jews. Launched by Andrew Anglin on July 4, 2013, The Daily Stormer is part of the alt-right movement.
- National Alliance: founded in 1974 by William Luther Pierce, the author of The Turner Diaries and Hunter.
- National Justice Party, founded by Mike Enoch in 2020, is a part of the below mentioned Patriot Front.
- National Renaissance Party: of occultist James H. Madole.
- National Socialist Movement: formed in 1974.
- National Socialist Party of America: founded in 1970 by Frank Collin.
- National States' Rights Party: founded in 1958 by J. B. Stoner.
- New Order: led by Matt Koehl with the goal of developing a religion based on Nazism.
- The Order: a revolutionary group founded in 1983 by Robert Jay Mathews.
- Patriot Front: an alt-right American nationalist movement founded by Thomas Rousseau as an offshoot of Vanguard America.
- Proud Boys: a far-right militant group with ties to advocates of white nationalism.
- Stormfront: a white nationalist website.
- Traditionalist Worker Party, a now defunct neo-fascist organization that was run by Matthew Heimbach, which was known for its sympathy for terrorist organizations and dictatorial regimes including Hezbollah, North Korea, Iran and Bashar al-Assad, it was founded in 2013 and it lasted until 2018.
- Universal Order: founded by James Mason and heavily influenced by Charles Manson.
- Vanguard America: founded by Dillion Irizarry, part of the Nationalist Front and the alt-right.
- Volksfront: a white power skinhead group led by Randall Krager.
- White Aryan Resistance: a highly racist organization founded and led by Tom Metzger.
- White Patriot Party: originally the Carolina Knights of the Ku Klux Klan, a group founded by Frazier Glenn Miller Jr. in 1980.

=== Canada ===
- Canadian Association for Free Expression, founded by Paul Fromm in 1981.
- Heritage Front, founded in 1989 and disbanded in 2005.
- National-Socialist Party of Canada, founded by Terry Tremaine in 2006.
- Nationalist Party of Canada, founded in 1977 by Don Andrews.
- Northern Order, a neo-Nazi terrorist organization founded in 2018.
- Western Guard Party, an extremist offshoot of the Edmund Burke Society founded in 1967.

== See also ==
- Anti-fascism
- Christian fascism, a form of clerical fascism
- Crypto-fascism
- Definitions of fascism
- Fascism and ideology
- Racism in Africa
- Fascism in Asia
  - Racism in Asia
- Fascism in Europe
  - Antisemitism in Europe
  - Racism in Europe
- Racism in North America
- Fascism in South America
  - Racism in South America
  - Nazism in the Americas
- Far-right politics
- Far-right subcultures
- Geography of antisemitism
- Hindu terrorism
- Hindutva
- Hindu nationalism
- History of antisemitism
- Nativism (politics)#United States
  - Nativism in United States politics
- Neo-Confederates, believers in the Lost Cause of the Confederacy, believers in the Lost Cause of the Confederacy
- Para-fascism
- Proto-fascism
- Post–World War II anti-fascism
- Racism by country
- Racism in Canada
- Racism in North America
- Racism in the United States
  - Antisemitism in the United States
    - History of antisemitism in the United States
  - Racism against African Americans
  - Racism against Asians#United States
  - Racism against Native Americans in the United States
- Radicalism in the United States
  - Radical right (United States)
    - Democratic backsliding in the United States
    - Fascism in the United States
    - Terrorism in the United States
      - Domestic terrorism in the United States
      - Pollitical violence in the United States
- Radical right (Europe)
  - Terrorism in Europe
- Religious discrimination in the United States
- Religious terrorism
- Right-wing terrorism#United States
- White backlash#United States
- White nationalism#United States
  - White nationalism in the United States
- White supremacy#United States
  - White supremacy in the United States
- Xenophobia#United States
  - Xenophobia in the United States
  - Xenophobia in the United States
- List of Fascist movements
- List of fascist movements by country
- List of Ku Klux Klan organizations
- List of neo-Nazi organizations
- List of organizations designated by the Southern Poverty Law Center as hate groups
- List of white nationalist organizations
