= List of federal political parties in Canada =

Unlike other federal political systems, Canadian political parties at the federal level are often loosely or not at all connected to parties at the provincial level, despite having similar names and policy positions. One exception is the New Democratic Party, which is organizationally integrated with most of its provincial counterparts.

== Current parties ==
=== Represented parties ===
These parties have seats in the House of Commons, which is Canada's elected assembly at the federal level. Members were elected in the 2025 Canadian federal election and subsequent by-elections.

Name	Founded	Leader	Ideology	Political position	Membership	MPs in Sept. 2026	Largest MP caucus	Most ridings contested
Liberal Party of Canada; Parti libéral du Canada	1867	Mark Carney	Liberalism, social liberalism	Centre to centre-left	~400,000 (2025) (Note: The Liberal Party of Canada does not have a paid membership, but instead offers the ability to "register" as a Liberal for free of cost.)	173 / 343	179 / 245 (1940) (Note: In 2015, the Liberal Party held 184 seats; the most in its history. However, at that time there were 338 seats total, so the proportion of seats held by the party was smaller than it was in 1940.)	338 / 338 (2015–2021) (Note: In 2025, the Liberals, Conservatives, and NDP each ran 342 candidates; the most in their histories. However, there were 343 seats at that time, so none were a full slate.)
Conservative Party of Canada; Parti conservateur du Canada	2003	Pierre Poilievre	Conservatism, social conservatism, economic liberalism	Centre-right to right-wing	678,708 (2022)	137 / 343	166 / 308 (2011)	338 / 338 (2015, 2019)
Bloc Québécois	1991	Yves-François Blanchet	Quebec sovereignty, social democracy, regionalism, republicanism	Centre-left	23,000 (2014)	21 / 343	54 / 295 (1993) (Note: The Bloc Québécois also won 54 seats in the 2004 election, but at the time there were 308 seats total, so the proportion of seats held by the party was smaller than it was in 1993.)	75 / 295 (1993) (Note: In the 2015–2025 elections the Bloc Québécois ran 78 candidates, but the House had 338 seats total, so the proportion of seats was smaller than it was in 1993.)
New Democratic Party; Nouveau Parti démocratique	1961	Avi Lewis	Democratic socialism, social democracy	Centre-left to left-wing	100,542 (2026)	5 / 343	103 / 308 (2011)	338 / 338 (2015–2021)
Green Party of Canada; Le Parti Vert du Canada	1983	Mike Morrice	Green politics		9,877 (2025)	1 / 343	3 / 338 (2019)	338 / 338 (2019)

=== Registered parties ===
The following political parties are registered with Elections Canada and eligible to run candidates in future federal elections, but are not currently represented in the House of Commons.

Name	Founded	Leader	Ideology	Political position	Membership	Largest MP caucus	Most ridings contested
Animal Protection Party; Le Parti pour la Protection des Animaux	2005	Liz White	Animal rights, environmentalism	—N/a		—	17 / 338 (2019)
Canadian Future Party; Parti avenir canadien	2024	Dominic Cardy	Centrism	Centre	1,401 (2024)	—	19 / 343 (2025)
Centrist Party of Canada; Parti centriste du Canada	2020	A.Q. Rana	Centrism	Centre		—	19 / 343 (2025)
Christian Heritage Party; Parti de l'Héritage Chrétien	1986	Rodney L. Taylor	Social conservatism, Christian right	Right-wing	6,000 (2015)	—	63 / 295 (1988)
Communist Party of Canada; Parti communiste du Canada	1921	Drew Garvie	Communism, Marxism–Leninism	Far-left		2 / 245 (1943) (Note: Known at the time as the Labor-Progressive Party.)	100 / 265 (1953) (Note: Known at the time as the Labor-Progressive Party.)
Marxist–Leninist Party of Canada; Parti Marxiste–Léniniste du Canada	1970	Anna Di Carlo	Communism, Marxism–Leninism, Anti-revisionism	Far-left		—	177 / 282 (1980)
People's Party of Canada; Parti populaire du Canada	2018	Maxime Bernier	Conservatism, right-libertarianism, right-wing populism	Right-wing to far-right	17,720 (2025)	1 / 338 (2018)	315 / 338 (2019)
Rhinoceros Party; Parti Rhinocéros	2006	Chinook B. Blais-Leduc	Satirical politics		260 (2022)	—	39 / 338 (2019)
Reforge Party (Note: Known as the United Party of Canada from 2024 to 2026.)	2024	Grant Abraham	Social conservatism, fiscal conservatism, right-wing populism	Right-wing to far-right	400–500 (2025)	—	16 / 343 (2025)

=== Eligible parties ===
Eligible parties have applied to Elections Canada and met all of the legal requirements to be registered, other than running a candidate in a general election or by-election. Such parties are eligible to run candidates in federal elections but are not be considered "registered" by Elections Canada until they have registered a candidate in an election or by-election. There are currently no eligible parties at the federal level.

=== Non-party parliamentary groups ===
At various points both the House of Commons and Senate have included non-party parliamentary groups, also called caucuses. These groups are unaffiliated with registered political parties, are not registered with Elections Canada, and do not run candidates in Canadian federal elections. Essentially, these parliamentary groups are equivalent to political parties in the legislative context, but do not exist in an electoral capacity.

Parliamentary groups in the House of Commons of Canada are typically made up of MPs that separate from a party over leadership conflicts. Notable past parliamentary groups in the House of Commons include the Ginger Group (1924–1932; split from Progressive Party), Democratic Representative Caucus (2001–2002; split from Canadian Alliance), and Québec debout (2018; split from Bloc Québécois).

=== Senate caucuses ===
The Senate of Canada is Canada's unelected upper chamber. It currently has three non-party parliamentary groups: the Independent Senators Group (ISG), the Canadian Senators Group (CSG), and the Progressive Senate Group (PSG). These three groups do not share a formal ideology, platform, or membership in any one political party; the caucuses primarily serve to provide organizational support and better leverage parliamentary resources. Conservative senators remain formally affiliated with the Conservative Party of Canada.

Name	Founded	Facilitator / Leader	Ideology	Senators in Oct. 2026	Most senators
Independent Senators Group; Groupe des sénateurs indépendants	2016	Raymonde Saint-Germain	Non-partisan technical group	37 / 105	59 / 105 (2019)
Progressive Senate Group; Groupe progressiste du sénat	2019	Pierre Dalphond	Progressivism, Non-partisan technical group	17 / 105	18 / 105 (2025)
Canadian Senators Group; Groupe des sénateurs Canadiens	2019	Scott Tannas	Non-partisan technical group	15 / 105	21 / 105 (2025)
Conservative Party of Canada; Parti conservateur du Canada	2003	Leo Housakos	Conservatism, economic liberalism	13 / 105	65 / 105 (2013)
Government Representative's Office; Bureau du représentant du gouvernement	2025	Pierre Moreau		5 / 105	5 / 105 (2025)

== Historical parties ==
=== Registered parties ===
These are political parties which held seats in the House of Commons and either ceased to exist before Elections Canada was formed, or were once registered with Elections Canada but have become de-registered or ceased to exist due to dissolution.

Name	Founded	Dissolved	Ideology	Largest MP caucus	Most ridings contested
Abolitionist Party	1993	1996	Social credit, monetary reform, social liberalism	—	80 / 295 (1993)
Anti-Confederation Party	1867	1867	Opposition to Confederation (membership in Canada), Nova Scotia separatism	18 / 181 (1867)	20 / 181 (1867)
Bloc populaire	1943	1949	Anti-conscription, Canadian nationalism, isolationism, French Canadian rights	4 / 245 (1943)	35 / 245 (1945)
Canada Party (1993)	1993	1996		—	56 / 295 (1993)
Canadian Action Party; Parti action canadienne	1997	2017	Canadian nationalism, anti-globalization	—	70 / 301 (2000)
Canadian Nationalist Party; Parti nationaliste canadien	2017	2022	White nationalism	—	3 / 338 (2019)
Canadian Reform Conservative Alliance; Alliance réformiste-conservatrice canadienne	2000	2003	Conservatism, right-wing populism, social conservatism	66 / 301 (2001)	298 / 301 (2000)
Co-operative Commonwealth Federation; Parti social démocratique	1932	1961	Social democracy, democratic socialism, agrarianism	31 / 245 (1948)	205 / 245 (1945)
Confederation of Regions Party	1984	1988	Regionalism, conservatism	—	55 / 282 (1984)
Conservative Party (1867) Progressive Conservative Party	1854	2003	Canadian conservatism, British loyalism, Canadian nationalism (particularly under John Diefenbaker), Red Toryism, economic liberalism (under Brian Mulroney), moderation, occasional populism	209 / 265 (1958) (Note: In 1984 the Progressive Conservative Party held 211 seats; the most in its history. However, at that time there were 282 seats total, so the proportion of seats held by the party was smaller than it was in 1958.)	301 / 301 (1997)
Democratic Party	1945	1945		—	5 / 245 (1945)
Direct Democracy Party	2019	2023	Direct democracy	—	7 / 338 (2019)
Equal Rights	1890	1891		—	2 / 215 (1891)
First Peoples National Party	2005	2013	Aboriginal rights advocacy	—	6 / 308 (2008)
Free Party Canada; Parti Libre Canada	2019	2024	Direct democracy Vaccine hesitancy	—	59 / 338 (2021)
Labour Party	1926	1968	Trade unionism, socialism	4 / 245 (1926)	28 / 235 (1921)
Libertarian Party of Canada; Parti Libertarien du Canada	1973	2026	Libertarianism, laissez-faire	—	88 / 295 (1988)
Marijuana Party; Parti Marijuana	2000	2025	Cannabis law reforms	—	73 / 301 (2000)
Maverick Party	2020	2025	Western separatism, conservatism, right-wing populism	—	29 / 338 (2021)
McCarthyite	1896	1898	Anti-Catholic, anti-French, British imperialism	1 / 213 (1896) (Note: Dalton McCarthy won in two ridings, but could only accept one.)	11 / 213 (1896)
National Citizens Alliance; Alliance Nationale des Citoyens	2014	2023	White nationalism	—	4 / 338 (2015, 2019, 2021)
National Party (1991)	1991	1994	Canadian nationalism, protectionism, progressivism	—	170 / 295 (1993)
Nationalist (1873)	1873	1910	Socialism, nationalization of industries	2 / 215 (1889)	6 / 215 (1887)
Natural Law Party; Parti de la loi naturelle	1992	2004	New age	—	231 / 295 (1993)
New Capitalist Party	1965	1965		—	3 / 265 (1965)
Newfoundland and Labrador First Party	2007	2011	Newfoundland and Labrador advocacy	—	3 / 308 (2008)
Non-Partisan League	1917	1917	Agrarianism	—	3 / 235 (1917)
Parti de la Démocratisation Économique	1968	1968		—	5 / 264 (1968)
Parti Nationaliste du Quebec	1983	1987	Quebec independence	—	74 / 282 (1984)
Party for the Commonwealth of Canada	1984	1993	LaRouchite	—	66 / 282 (1984)
Parti Patriote	2019	2022	Quebec nationalism, Quebec sovereignty, right-wing populism	—	2 / 338 (2021)
Patrons of Industry	1890	1900	Pro-labour	2 / 213 (1896)	31 / 213 (1896)
People's Political Power Party; Pouvoir Politique du Peuple	2006	2011	Feminist, centrist, populist	—	2 / 308 (2008)
Pirate Party; Parti Pirate	2010	2017	Pirate politics	—	10 / 308 (2011)
Parti pour l'Indépendance du Québec	2019	2022	Québec independence	—	13 / 338 (2019)
Progressive Canadian Party; Parti Progressiste Canadien	2004	2019	Red Toryism	—	25 / 308 (2006)
Progressive Party; Parti progressiste United Farmers	1921	1948	Agrarian, free trade, progressivism	58 / 235 (1921)	137 / 235 (1921)
Protestant Protective Association	1892	1898	Anti-Catholic, Anti-French	—	5 / 213 (1896)
Radical chrétien	1958	1967		—	3 / 265 (1967 by-elections)
Ralliement créditiste Union des électeurs	1963	1971	Split from the Social Credit Party; see Social Credit Party of Canada split, 1963.	14 / 264 (1968)	77 / 265 (1965)
Reconstruction Party	1935	1938	Keynesianism, national conservatism, isolationism	1 / 245 (1935)	172 / 245 (1935)
Reform Party; Parti réformiste	1987	2000	Fiscal conservatism, regionalism, social conservatism, democratic reform	60 / 301 (1997)	277 / 301 (1997)
Republican Party (1967); Parti republicain	1967	1968		—	2 / 264 (1968)
Republican Party (1971); Parti republicain	1971	1971		—	2 / 264 (1971 by-elections)
Rhinoceros Party (1963); Parti Rhinocéros	1968	1993	Satirical	—	121 / 282 (1980)
Social Credit Party; Parti Crédit social	1935	1993	Canadian social credit, Canadian conservatism, right-wing populism, social conservatism	30 / 265 (1962)	230 / 265 (1962)
Socialist Labour Party	1945	1968	Socialism	—	2 / 245 (1945)
Socialist Party (1904)	1904	1925	Socialism, Classical Marxism, Anti-Leninism	—	6 / 221 (1911)
Socialist Party (1931)	1931	1961	Socialism, Classical Marxism, Anti-Leninism	—	2 / 265 (1958)
Stop Climate Change	2019	2021	Environmentalism	—	2 / 338 (2019)
Strength in Democracy; Forces et Démocratie	2014	2016	Social democracy, regionalism	2 / 338 (2015)	17 / 338 (2015)
Union Populaire	1979	1981	Quebecois independence (precursor of Bloc Québécois)	—	69 / 282 (1979)
United Party (2009); Parti Uni	2009	2016	Centrism	—	3 / 308 (2011)
United Party (2018); Parti Uni	2018	2020		—	4 / 338 (2019)
United Reform	1939	1940	Left-wing populism, reformism	2 / 245 (1939)	5 / 245 (1940)
Veterans Coalition Party; Parti de la coalition des anciens combattants	2019	2023	Single issue	—	25 / 338 (2019)
Western Block Party	2005	2014	Western separatism, paleoconservatism, libertarian conservativism	—	4 / 308 (2006)

=== Non-party parliamentary groups ===
These caucuses were formed by sitting members of the House of Commons, but never ran in an election as a unified party.

Name	Founded	Dissolved	Description	Largest caucus	Most ridings contested
Democratic Representative Caucus	2001	2002	Formed in the 37th Canadian Parliament by MPs who left the Canadian Alliance due to the leadership of Stockwell Day. The group was dissolved after Day lost the party leadership to Stephen Harper.	13 / 301 (2002)	—
Ginger Group	1924	1932	Split from the Progressive Party. Supported Progressivism and socialism. In 1932 formed the Cooperative Commonwealth Federation.	15 / 245 (1926)	Likely some number of Labour candidates
Liberal–Progressive	1925	1955	Nominated jointly by or aligned with both the Liberal Party and Progressive Party.	8 / 245 (1926)	12 / 245 (1926)
Liberal–Unionist	1917	1921	Members of the Liberal Party who supported Robert Borden's coalition government.	11 / 235 (1917)	Likely some number of Unionist candidates
Nationalist Conservative	1878	1911	Used by Quebec Members in order to distinguish themselves from what has been referred by the party as the "British imperialist" reputation of the Conservative Party.	2 / 215 (1887)	2 / 215 (1887)
Nationalist Liberal	1867	1921		1 / 215 (1891)	—
Parti canadien	1942	1944	Anti-conscription. In addition to the MP who adopted this label, two candidates ran in by-elections using this label.	1 / 245 (1942)	—
Progressive–Conservative	1925	1935	Probably indicates that these candidates were supporters of both the Progressive Party of Canada and the historical Conservative Party.	1 / 245 (1930)	2 / 245 (1926)
Québec debout	2018	2018	Formed when several MPs left the Bloc Québécois due to the leadership of Martine Ouellet. The group was dissolved after Ouellet lost a leadership review vote and resigned.	7 / 338 (2018)	—

=== Designations used by single candidates ===
These titles appear in official records, and may have appeared on ballots, but were only ever used as a personal brand by lone candidates.

- Action Canada (Paul Hellyer), 1971–1972
- All Canadian Party (John Darby Naismith), 1962–1962
- Alliance of the North (François Bélanger), 2013–2019
- Anti-Communist (Jean Tissot), 1935
- Anti-Communist (Patrick Walsh), 1953
- Anti-Conscriptionist (Louis-Gérard Gosselin), 1940
- Autonomist candidate (Paul Massé), 1947
- The Bridge Party of Canada (David Berlin), 2015–2017
- Canada Party (II) (Jim Pankiw) 2015–2016
- Canadian Democrat (Gerry Goeujon), 1957
- Capital familial (Henri-Georges Grenier), 1957–1962
- Christian Democrat Party of Canada (Sydney Thompson), 1981
- Christian Liberal (Howard A. Prentice), 1953
- Co-operative Builders of Canada (Edgar-Bernard Charron), 1962
- Droit vital personnel (Henri-Georges Grenier), 1965
- Esprit Social (Henri-Georges Grenier), 1967–1971
- Franc Lib (Alfred Edward Watts), 1930
- Franc Lib (Jean-Roger Marcotte), 1968
- League for Socialist Action, 1961–1977
- Liberal Conservative Coalition (George Rolland), 1957
- National Credit Control (John Bernard Ball), 1957
- Nationalist (Adrien Arcand), 1949, 1953
- Nationalist Liberal (Fleming Blanchard McCurdy), 1920
- Nationalist Party of Canada (Bob Smith), founded 1977
- National Socialist (Martin K. Weiche), 1968
- National-Unity (Robert Rae Manville), 1940
- National Unity Party (Parti national social chrétien) (Adrien Arcand), 1938–1949
- New Canada Party (Fred Reiner), 1968
- New Constitution Party of Canada (James Sears), c. 2014–2018
- Option Canada (Greg Gogan), 1991–1993
- Parti humain familial (Henri-Georges Grenier), 1964
- Parti ouvrier canadien (Jean-Jacques Rouleau), 1958
- Party for Accountability, Competency and Transparency (formerly Online Party) (Michael Nicula), 2012–2016
- People's Co-operative Commonwealth Federation (Herbert Wilfred Herridge), 1945
- Progressive Workers Movement (Jerry Le Bourdais), 1965
- Prohibition Party (Edwin Clarke Appleby), 1930
- Protectionist (Joseph-Édouard Moranville), 1926
- Seniors Party of Canada (Margaret Leigh Fairbairn), 2014–2016
- Social Credit-National Unity (Harry Watson Arnold), 1940
- Technocrat (Joseph McCrae Newman), 1935
- Trades Union (Nigel Morgan), 1945
- Verdun (Hervé Ferland), 1935
- Veterans Party (Alloys Reginald Sprenger), 1935
- Work Less Party (Betty Krawczyk), 2007–2010

=== Senate technical groups ===
These groups of Senators each sat together as a caucus, but were not affiliated with an active political party.

Name	Founded	Dissolved	Ideology	Largest caucus
Liberal–Unionist	1917	1921	Members of the Liberal Party who supported Robert Borden's coalition government.	4 / 96 (1919)
Nationalist Liberal	1867	1921		2 / 72 (1867)
Senate Liberal Caucus; Caucus libéral du Sénat	2014	2019	Members of the Liberal Party who formed their own caucus after Justin Trudeau removed all senators from the Liberal Party's parliamentary caucus.	32 / 105 (2014)
Senate Progressive Conservative Caucus; Caucus progressiste-conservateur du Sénat	2003	2016	Members of the former Progressive Conservative Party who retained the caucus name after the party itself dissolved in 2003.	5 / 105 (2005)

=== Pre-Confederation political parties ===
- Parties in the Dominion of Newfoundland
  - Confederate Association
  - Conservative Party (including Reform Party, Tory Party, and Liberal-Conservative-Progressive Party)
  - Economic Union Party
  - Fishermen's Protective Union (including Union Party)
  - Liberal Party (including Liberal Reform Movement and Liberal-Progressive Party)
  - Newfoundland People's Party (including Liberal-Labour-Progressive Party)
  - Responsible Government League
  - United Newfoundland Party
- Parties in Lower Canada and Canada East (now Quebec)
  - Château Clique
  - Parti bleu
  - Parti canadien
  - Parti rouge
  - Patriote movement
- Parties in Nova Scotia, New Brunswick, and Prince Edward Island
  - Anti-Confederation Party
  - Confederation Party
- Parties in Upper Canada and Canada West (now Ontario)
  - Clear Grits
  - Family Compact
  - Reform Party
  - Upper Canada Tories

== Unofficial designations and parties who never ran candidates ==
The following parties do not appear on the federal election archive. They either did not run candidates in any election or ran candidates as independents.

Name	Founded	Dissolved	Description	Largest MP caucus	Most ridings contested
Aboriginal Peoples Party of Canada	2005	2005	Attempt to found a party that fizzled when the First Peoples National Party of Canada became a registered party.	—	—
Canadian Labour Party	1917	1929	Attempt to unite the disparate Labour candidates and parties in Canada.	—	some non-affiliated candidates in 1917–1926
Canadian Renewal Party	1993	1993	Advocate for direct democracy; affiliated with the Marxist–Leninist Party	—	some non-affiliated candidates in 1993
Canadian Union of Fascists	1934	1940	Breakaway wing of the Canadian Nationalist Party (1933)	—	—
Christian Credit Party	1982	1983		—	—
Christian Freedom Party of Canada	c. 1988	c. 1996	Rebrand of the moribund Social Credit Party	—	some non-affiliated candidates in 1993
Revolutionary Workers League Communist League	1977	c. 2019	Merger of the League for Socialist Action, the Revolutionary Marxist Group, and the Groupe Marxiste Revolutionaire. Ran candidates as independents.	—	3 / 308 (2006)
Liberal Protectionist	1925	1930.	Supporters of the Liberal Party who opposed the party's free trade policy.	—	2 / 245 (1925)
The Waffle Movement for an Independent Socialist Canada	1969	1974	Breakaway wing of New Democratic Party.	—	some non-affiliated candidates in 1974
National Party of Canada (1979)	1979	late 1980s	Left-wing nationalist party.	—	2 / 282 (1980)
North American Labour Party	c. 1975	c. 1980	Canadian affiliate of the Lyndon LaRouche movement; later became the Party for the Commonwealth of Canada	—	some non-affiliated candidates in 1970s
Technocratic Party of Canada	2012	2014	Attempt to form a party but lost key members. Wanted experts in STEM as ministers, advocated technocracy.	—	—
Workers' Communist Party of Canada	1975	1983	One of several early attempts to create a Marxist–Leninist party in Canada.	—	30 / 282 (1980)

== Name changes ==
Communist Party

The Communist Party of Canada changed its name multiple times in its history. It was founded as the Communist Party of Canada in 1921. It was underground until 1924, and founded a public face, "Workers' Party of Canada", from 1922 until 1924 when the Communist Party was legalised. From 1938 until 1943 its candidates ran under the banner "Unity" or "United Progressive", and won two seats, both in Saskatchewan. The Communist Party was again banned in 1940, but from 1943 operated under the name "Labor-Progressive Party" (Parti ouvrier-progressiste). It won one seat under this name in a 1943 by-election, which it retained in 1945. In 1959 it reverted to the name Communist Party of Canada and has kept that name to the present.

The Marxist–Leninist Party of Canada unofficially uses the name "Communist Party of Canada (Marxist–Leninist)", but Elections Canada does not allow it to be registered by that name because of potential confusion with the Communist Party of Canada.

Labour Party

Labour Party candidates ran under numerous different designations:

- Conservative-Labour (1872–1875)
- Farmer Labour
- Farmer-United Labour
- Labour-Farmer
- Liberal-Labour (1926–1968)
- National Labour (1940)
- United Farmers-Labour (1920)
- United Farmers of Ontario-Labour (1919–1940)

Liberal Party

During Robert Borden's coalition government of 1917–1920, the Liberal Party of Canada split into two groups: the Liberal–Unionist who supported the coalition and the Laurier Liberals who opposed it.

Liberal-Progressive

Some Liberal-Progressive candidates used the designations:

- Liberal-Labour-Progressive or
- National Liberal Progressive.

New Democratic Party

The Co-operative Commonwealth Federation used the name New Party from 1958 to 1961 while it was transitioning to become the New Democratic Party. In French, the party used a literal translation of its name, Fédération du Commonwealth Coopératif, from until 1955.

Conservative Party

The first Conservative Party used several different names during its existence:

- Liberal-Conservative Party (some MPs until 1911),
- Unionist Party (1917–1921),
- National Liberal and Conservative Party (1920–1921),
- National Government (1940),
- Progressive Conservative Party (1942–2003)

The second (and current) Conservative Party of Canada was a merger of the Canadian Alliance and the Progressive Conservative Party.

Progressive Party and United Farmers

Some candidates for the Progressive Party of Canada used United Farmer designations:

- Farmer (1925 & 1930),
- National Progressive Party
- United Farmers of Canada,
- United Farmers of Alberta,
- United Farmers of Ontario.

Rhinoceros Party

The first Rhinoceros Party disbanded in 1993. When it was revived in 2006 it used the name "neorhino.ca". The party changed its name to Rhinoceros Party in 2010.

Social Credit Party and Ralliement créditiste

Some Ralliement créditiste used the name Ralliement des créditistes from 1963 to 1967. One candidate used the designation Candidats des électeurs in 1957 and 1958. Others used the name Union des électeurs, although this was never formally registered.

In the 1940 election, 17 candidates ran jointly with the Social Credit Party under the name New Democracy.

== See also ==
- Federal political financing in Canada
- List of political parties in Canada
