= John Ross Taylor =

Canadian politician

John Ross Taylor (1913 – November 6, 1994) was a Canadian fascist political activist and party leader prominent in white nationalist circles.

== Early life and family ==
Born into a well-known Toronto, Ontario family, the son of lawyer Oscar Taylor and grandson of John Taylor, a Toronto manufacturer and alderman. In 1948, Taylor married Myrtle Bowman, in Toronto. They divorced, and in 1957, Myrtle sued Taylor for custody of their daughter, Wanda.

== Fascism ==
Taylor's fascist activities began in the 1920s. In the summer of 1937, Taylor joined with the Quebec-based fascist leader Adrien Arcand and his Parti national social chrétien (later the National Unity Party of Canada). Taylor played a key role in organizing the putative party in English Canada as the National Christian Party and ran in the 1937 Ontario general election in the predominantly-Jewish riding of St. Andrew in Toronto on an antisemitic platform, but withdrew before the election. Soon after, Taylor broke with Arcand and Taylor's National Christian Party formed an alliance with the Canadian Union of Fascists led by Chuck Crate, which Taylor soon joined, becoming the CUF's secretary and organizer. Taylor was interned as a Nazi sympathizer for 53 months during World War II under the Defence of Canada Regulations. He later said he decided to break with Arcand as Arcand was a Roman Catholic while Taylor, at the time, was an ardent Christian Scientist. At the time, as well, there was a strong anti-Catholic sentiment in Toronto among the largely British Protestant population.

== Post-war ==
During the 1960s, Taylor acted as the Canadian representative of the antisemitic National States' Rights Party and was based at his farm at Gooderham, north of Peterborough, Ontario, where he held fascist meetings and published virulent antisemitic and racist literature that led Canada Post to revoke his mailing privileges. He also led his own movement with David Stanley which he called "Natural Order". In 1965, he was featured on the Canadian Broadcasting Corporation's public affairs program This Hour Has Seven Days. During his interview with CBC journalist Larry Zolf, Taylor called for Jews to be exiled to Madagascar.

== Social Credit ==
In the 1963 Ontario election, he ran in St. Andrew riding for the "Social Credit Action", a splinter group from the Social Credit Party of Ontario. However, when his political past was reported, the Social Credit Action group dumped Taylor and he ran instead as a candidate of the "Natural Order of Social Credit Organization". He won 102 votes, or about 1% of the total cast.

== Western Guard ==
Taylor was a founding member of the white supremacist political party, the Western Guard. He ran for Toronto City Council in the 1972 municipal election as a candidate for the Western Guard placing last in Ward 11. In 1973, he was the party's candidate in a provincial by-election in the Toronto riding of St. George where he came in sixth and last place with 83 votes (0.4% of the popular vote).

In the 1974 federal election, he was the Western Guard's candidate for the House of Commons of Canada in the riding of Davenport and described himself during an all candidates meeting as "a racist and a fascist". As the Western Guard was not a registered federal political party, he was officially an independent candidate. Taylor received 102 votes (0.69% of the popular vote), placing fourth in a field of six candidates.

From 1970 to 1977, Taylor was once more involved with the Social Credit Association of Ontario as a result of a takeover of the party by Paul Fromm and the Western Guard. In 1972, the Social Credit Party of Canada declared membership in the Western Guard "incompatible" with membership in Social Credit had the provincial association put into trusteeship and Taylor, Fromm and their supporters were expelled though Taylor continued to lead a splinter group that claimed to be the Social Credit party until 1977.

== Canadian Human Rights Commission and imprisonment ==
In 1976, as a result of Don Andrews' conviction for hate crimes, he became leader of the Western Guard, renaming it the Western Guard Party. He also established ties to the Ku Klux Klan and attended the International Patriotic Conference held by David Duke that year. In the 1980s, Taylor was twice found in contempt of court for refusing to comply with a 1979 order by the Canadian Human Rights Tribunal to end his recorded "White Power" messages on the Western Guard Party's phone line. He was fined $5,000 and imprisoned from October 17, 1981, to March 19, 1982, and once more later in the decade for violating the Canadian Human Rights Act. In 1990, the Supreme Court of Canada upheld the ruling against Taylor, in the landmark case R v Taylor. However, he did not have to return to prison.

== Later life ==
Taylor was a fixture during the 1989 trial of accused Nazi war criminal Imre Finta and could be seen carrying lawyer Douglas Christie's books. He was also an associate of Ernst Zündel and Jim Keegstra.

In the last years of his life, Taylor was active in the Aryan Nations after he moved to Calgary following his release from prison. In 1993, using the pseudonym "His Excellency J. J. Wills", he co-wrote a book with Robert O'Driscoll titled The New World Order in North America which Bernie Farber described as "the antisemitic ravings of a very confused mind."

He appears in the 1991 documentary film Blood in the Face, directed by Kevin Rafferty, which looks at the American neo-fascist movement. The name of the film is taken from the Biblical name Adam which in the Hebrew means to "show blood in the face." Christian Identity advocates claim this is evidence that Adam was a white man.

He died in a Calgary boarding house in 1994.

== Electoral record ==
1963 Ontario general election: St. Andrew, Toronto
| Party | Candidate | Votes | Vote % |
|---|---|---|---|
| Progressive Conservative | Allan Grossman | 4,309 | 43.9 |
| Liberal | Donald Catalano | 3,476 | 35.4 |
| New Democratic | Ellen Adams | 1,638 | 16.7 |
| Independent | Sam Sherman | 194 | 2.0 |
| Independent | Dorothy Cureatz | 103 | 1.0 |
| Social Credit (National Order) | John Ross Taylor | 102 | 1.0 |
| | Total | 9,822 | |

1974 Canadian federal election: Davenport, Toronto
| Party | Candidate | Votes | % | ±% |
|---|---|---|---|---|
| Liberal | Charles Caccia | 12,294 | 59.6 | +15.9 |
| Progressive Conservative | Brownie Darubin | 4,542 | 22.0 | -8.0 |
| New Democratic | Mairi McElhill | 3,476 | 16.8 | -7.8 |
| Communist | Mike Phillips | 123 | 0.6 | -0.3 |
| Independent | John Ross Taylor | 102 | 0.5 | |
| Marxist–Leninist | Richard Daly | 95 | 0.5 | -0.3 |
| Total valid votes | | 20,632 | 100.0 | |
