= William Krehm =

Canadian author, journalist, political activist, and real estate developer (1913–2019)

- Born: November 23, 1913; Toronto, Canada
- Died: April 19, 2019 (aged 105); Toronto, Canada
- Other name: Wolfe Krehm
- Occupation: Correspondent
- Known for: Anti-fascism, journalism, political advocacy
- Relatives: Ida Krehm (sister)
- Military career
- Service years: 1937
- Unit: POUM Militia
- Conflicts: Spanish Civil War: May Days (POW)

William Krehm (November 23, 1913 – April 19, 2019), also known as Wolfe Krehm, was a Canadian author, journalist, political activist and real estate developer. A prominent figure in the early Canadian Trotskyist movement, he travelled to Spain during the Spanish Civil War, where he worked with the anti-Stalinist Workers' Party of Marxist Unification (POUM) as a propagandist, translator and journalist. Following the suppression of the POUM in 1937, he was imprisoned for three months and subsequently expelled from Spain.

Krehm later spent eight years in Latin America, where he worked as a journalist and became a correspondent for Time. He returned to Canada in 1948, worked as a music critic for The Globe and Mail and CBC Radio, and subsequently became a home builder and real estate developer. In 1963, he and his brother-in-law Ben Cowan founded what became O'Shanter Development Co.

After retiring from the real estate business, Krehm devoted much of his later life to economic and monetary issues. He co-founded the Committee on Monetary and Economic Reform (COMER) in the 1980s and remained one of its principal figures. In his late 90s and early 100s, he was a plaintiff in COMER's unsuccessful legal challenge concerning the role of the Bank of Canada. He died in Toronto in 2019 at the age of 105.

== Early life ==
Krehm was born in Toronto to Hyman and Sarah Krehm, Jews who had left the Russian Empire separately between 1905 and 1910, before meeting and marrying in Toronto's St. John's Ward, known as The Ward, a working class district that was home to successive waves of immigrants. Hyman Krehm and his brother, Harry, had been furriers in Russia and continued that trade in Canada. Sarah and Hyman Krehm operated West End Retail Furriers, a fur dealership, and raised their children in the apartment above the store. The business struggled, and Hyman also worked at other jobs. The site was commemorated by Heritage Toronto with a plaque in 2021 recognizing the Krehm family and the achievements of William and his sister Ida.

William Krehm was a talented violinist and his sister, Ida Krehm (1912–1998), a promising pianist, prompting their parents to send both of them to Chicago in 1929 to study music. While Ida remained in Chicago at the Chicago Musical College, ultimately marrying musician and industrialist Joseph Pick, and becoming a pianist and conductor of international renown, William Krehm moved to New York City where he worked selling hats. After the 1929 Stock Market Crash, he became interested in Marxism.

Returning to Toronto, he attended Parkdale Collegiate Institute and was a tutor to fellow student Gladys Cowan whom he would later marry. Earlier, while in grade 9, he and his brother Aubrey organized a protest against an antisemitic teacher. He graduated from high school in 1930 and studied mathematics at the University of Toronto for two years before dropping out for lack of funds. Other sources, however, describe him as a University of Toronto graduate.

== Trotskyism ==
Krehm had become a Trotskyist at the age of 16 while living in New York, recruited to the movement by Albert Glotzer. On returning to Canada, he joined the nascent Canadian Trotskyist movement in Toronto, which was a branch of the US-based Communist League of America. Krehm led a faction in opposition to Canadian Trotskyist leader Maurice Spector and dropped in and out of the organization, eventually moving to Montreal and becoming leader of the party branch there. In 1934, Krehm and his followers, along with B. J. Field and his followers in the United States, left the CLA to form the Organizing Committee for a Revolutionary Workers Party (later known as the League for a Revolutionary Workers Party, and colloquially as the "Fieldites"), and affiliated with the international organization known as the International Bureau of Revolutionary Socialist Parties or London Bureau. Krehm became leader of the Canadian group and editor of its newspaper Workers' Voice.

== Spanish Civil War ==
In July 1936, Krehm sailed to Europe via the RMS Empress of Britain. Krehm went to Europe as the League for a Revolutionary Workers Party's delegate to a conference of the International Revolutionary Marxist Centre being held in Brussels in October. He visited Barcelona for five days in September before returning to Belgium, and went back to Spain the following month, after the conference, becoming one of 1,600 Canadians who volunteered to fight in the Spanish Civil War. Krehm left in late 1936 to attend a conference of left-wing groups in Paris and then went to London where he met Charles Donnelly, spending Christmas with him. Donnelly urged Krehm to join the International Brigades with him. However, he decided to return to Spain on his own and joined the Partido Obrero de Unificación Marxista (POUM) as a propagandist, translator and journalist, and as such would occasionally visit the front lines, and was one of the last survivors of that conflict.

He met fellow POUM member Eric Arthur Blair, (better known by his pen name, George Orwell), and used to chat with him in the cafes of Barcelona. Krehm was in Barcelona during the May Days street battles when the Comintern-affiliated Unified Socialist Party of Catalonia attempted to eliminate the POUM. In June 1937, after the POUM was outlawed by the Spanish Republic at the instigation of the Communist Party, the house in which Krehm was staying was raided by Spanish secret police and he and his comrades were detained with Krehm under suspicion of being a spy He spent three months in jail and was released after a hunger strike, driven by police to the French border, and expelled from Spain in August 1937, arriving in Halifax at the end of November. Krehm returned to Toronto where he wrote a pamphlet, Spain: Revolution and Counter-Revolution, and toured Canada and the US giving speeches about his experiences in Spain.

== Anti-fascist activism in Canada ==
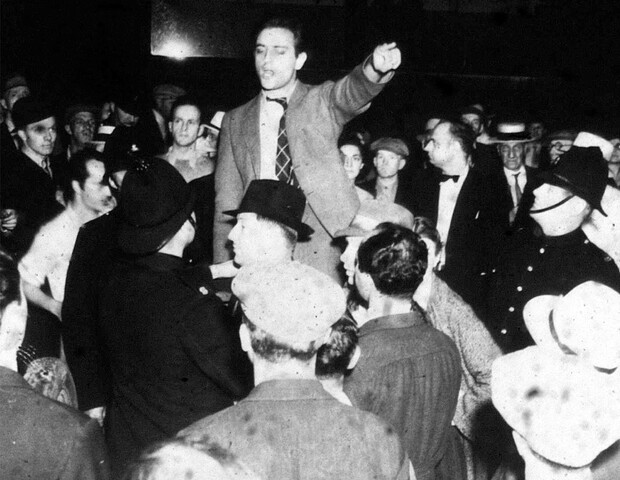
William Krehm leading an anti-fascist rally outside Massey Hall, 1938. (City of Toronto Archives)

Krehm resumed his leadership of the Canadian section of the League for a Revolutionary Workers Party which was, for a time, larger and more active than the official Trotskyist group it had split from. In response to separate fascist rallies being planned by the Canadian Union of Fascists and what became the National Unity Party of Canada, Krehm and the LRWP organized the Provisional Anti-Fascist Committee to organize counterdemonstrations. The committee consisted of the League for a Revolutionary Workers’ Party, the Toronto branch of the Industrial Workers of the World, Toronto Libertarian Group (an anarchist group founded by Emma Goldman while she was living in Toronto), and working-class Jewish organizations such as the Workmen’s Circle. In early June 1938, Krehm's committee organized a counterdemonstration against the Canadian Union of Fascists' rally at Princes' Hall on Bloor Street. The demonstrators were able to block access to the hall with 200 to 300 protesters throwing tomatoes at the 26 attendees of the fascist rally. Several days later, Krehm's group organized a protest against the first joint rally of the Canadian Nationalist Party and Adrien Arcand and his Christian National Socialist Party at Forester's Hall on June 9, 1938. Krehm's Provisional Anti-Fascist Committee rallied 200 people south of Forester's Hall. Police had a larger presence due to the violence at the previous rally and prevented the protesters from blocking the road, sidewalk, or entrance to the hall.

The CNP and Arcand's group held a final joint rally on July 4, 1938, at Massey Hall in Toronto in order to launch a new organization, the National Unity Party of Canada. The Co-operative Commonwealth Federation and Communist Party of Canada refused to organize an attempt to stop the rally. Instead, the CCF held its own rally at Queen's Park, which drew around 500 people, and the Communist Party, through its affiliate, the Canadian League for Peace and Democracy, organized a mass rally of 10,000 people at Maple Leaf Gardens at the same time as the fascist rally at Massey Hall. Krehm's Provisional Anti-Fascist Committee persisted and organized a rally of between 500 and 900 people a block away from Massey Hall with the intention of marching to the building. As Krehm began to speak, police on horseback and on foot surrounded the protesters while Krehm shouted "Down with fascism, down with the police, and down with the police commission!" The police, claiming that the "temper of the crowd was getting ugly", and decided to disperse the rally. Officers approached Krehm and ordered him to step down and call off the rally. He refused, and was charged with obstructing police. Three others were also arrested when they attempted to intercede on Krehm's behalf. Krehm and his colleague were found guilty and fined $25 each. In response, a solidarity rally was organized in the United States which organizers estimated to have attracted 4,000 protesters.

== Foreign correspondent in Latin America ==
Finding that the Trotskyist movement had dwindling support, and increasingly disillusioned by revolutionary politics following his experiences in Spain, Krehm moved to Mexico, arriving with only $270 in his pocket, in the hopes of working as a foreign correspondent. When World War II broke out he wanted to return to Canada to enlist in the military but couldn't when he found he was not allowed to cross the border into the United States.

While in Mexico City, he sought and was granted an interview with Leon Trotsky but the exiled Soviet revolutionary was assassinated on August 21, 1940, before the interview could take place. Krehm stood guard over his body at his funeral.

Krehm would remain in Latin America for eight years. During this period, Gladys left Canada to join him and they married and had a son, Adam, while the couple was living in Peru. After struggling for several years as a freelance journalist, Krehm was hired by Time Magazine in 1943 as the magazine's correspondent in Latin America. With the emergence of the Cold War, Krehm was fired by Time in 1947 after writing several articles and a book critical of American intervention in Latin America and the Caribbean.

== Return to Canada ==
Unemployed, Krehm returned to Canada in 1948 with his wife and worked as a music critic for The Globe and Mail and CBC Radio, appearing on CJBC Views The Shows in the mid-1950s.

As the Cold War intensified in the 1950s, Krehm found that his radical past imperiled his employability. His home was frequently visited by the RCMP Security Service and his appearances on CBC came to an end.

Finding it difficult to sustain enough employment to support his family, which had grown with the birth of a second son, Jonathan, Krehm decided to start his own business as a home builder and property developer in the mid-1950s. In 1963, he and his brother-in-law, Ben Cowan, founded what became O'Shanter Development Co. Benefiting from the post-war property development boom in the Toronto suburbs during the post-war housing boom, Krehm became wealthy and O'Shanter became one of Toronto's biggest landlords. In the 1970s and 80s, he campaigned against rent control after it was introduced by the provincial government.

Krehm retired from O'Shanter in the 1980s, turning the operation of the company over to his sons, who continue to own and operate it today.

== COMER ==
Krehm retired in the 1980s and devoted his time to studying and writing on economics, co-founding the Committee on Monetary and Economic Reform later in the 1980s.

In 2011, Krehm was the co-plaintiff in a suit by COMER against the Bank of Canada in an attempt to compel it to provide debt-free support for public projects undertaken by federal, provincial and city governments. The plaintiffs argued that by not doing so, the bank was violating the Bank of Canada Act. The lawsuit also alleged that the federal government had ceded its sovereign ability to conduct independent monetary policy to "secret" deliberations and private foreign bankers. The case was dismissed by the Federal Court of Appeal in 2016. In May 2017, the Supreme Court of Canada denied the plaintiffs' request for leave to appeal.

== Later life ==
Krehm continued playing violin into his 90s. He died, aged 105, in Toronto in 2019.

== Works by William Krehm ==
- SPAIN: Revolution and Counter-Revolution (1937?)
- Democracia y tiranias en el Caribe (1947)
- Growing Pains for Latin America (1948)
- Price in a mixed economy: Our record of disaster (1975)
- Babel's tower: The dynamics of economic breakdown (1977)
- How to Make Money in a Mismanaged Economy and Other Essays (1980)
- Democracies and tyrannies of the Caribbean (1984, originally published in Spanish in 1947)
- A power unto itself : the Bank of Canada : the threat to our nation's economy (1993)
