= Fascism in Canada =

Fascism in Canada (French: Fascisme au Canada) consists of a variety of movements and political parties in Canada during the 20th century. Largely a fringe ideology, Fascism has never commanded a large following in Canada, however it was most popular during the Great Depression.

During the 1930s, the Canadian Union of Fascists (CUF) was founded. Based first in Winnipeg, then in Toronto, it was led by Chuck Crate and modelled on Oswald Mosley's British Union of Fascists. Around the same time, in February 1934 in Quebec, the Parti national social chrétien (transl. National Social Christian Party) was founded by journalist and self-proclaimed "Canadian Führer" Adrien Arcand. The CUF split off of the Winnipeg-based Canadian Nationalist Party (CNP), led by William Whittaker. The CNP merged with Arcand's Parti national social chrétien du Canada in 1938, along with fascist groups based in Ontario and Quebec (many of whom were known as "swastika clubs"), to form the National Unity Party of Canada in July 1938.

At the outbreak of World War II, most openly fascist organizations and political parties were banned and most Canadian fascist leaders were interned under the Defence of Canada Regulations. Arcand would spend the war under guard at the Petawawa military base alongside other 'enemy organization' leaders, while other members of the movement would be similarly interned in areas of New Brunswick. In the post-war period, Fascism never recovered its former small influence.

== See also ==
- Neo-Nazism in Canada
