= Canadian League for Peace and Democracy =

1934–1940 mass organization in Canada

- Abbreviation: CLPD
- Formation: 1934 (as Canadian League Against War and Fascism)
- Dissolved: 1940 (banned)
- Type: Non-governmental organization
- Purpose: Anti-fascist front
- Headquarters: Toronto, Ontario, Canada
- Region served: Canada
- Chairman: A. A. MacLeod
- Parent organization: World Committee Against War and Fascism

The Canadian League for Peace and Democracy, founded in October 1934 as the Canadian League Against War and Fascism, was an anti-fascist mass organization chaired by A. A. MacLeod and allied with the Communist Party of Canada. It gained prominence as a leading organizer of opposition within Canada to Nazi Germany following Hitler's rise to power and as an opponent of fascist groups organizing within Canada in the years leading up to World War II. It was dissolved in 1940 following the implementation of the Defence of Canada Regulations.

== Background ==
Inclusive of various leftist and labour groups, the league signified the Communist Party's move to a popular front strategy against fascism and was affiliated with the World Committee Against War and Fascism. The founding conference had more than 500 delegates in attendance. The organization attempted to build support across a cross-section of people outside of the Communist Party and attracted affiliations by some trade union locals about a dozen Co-operative Commonwealth Federation clubs and several youth groups. For a time, prominent social democrats such as Tommy Douglas and Frank Underhill were vice-presidents of the league, and CCF MPs Douglas and William Irvine along with a Social Credit MP and several clergymen were also involved. Through pamphlets and public meetings, its goal was "educating the Canadian population on the evils of fascism and mobilizing Canadians to protest fascism abroad and at home."

== Activities ==
The League established the Canadian Committee to Aid Spanish Democracy, also chaired by MacLeod, and was involved in organizing the Mackenzie–Papineau Battalion and support for the Republicans in the Spanish Civil War, generally. The League produced the pamphlet Spain's Democracy Talks To Canada in 1936.

The League was active in denouncing fascist groups in Canada such as the Canadian Nationalist Party, the Canadian Union of Fascists, and the National Unity Party of Canada, opposed Quebec's Padlock Law, protested the persecution of Jews in Europe, and called for a boycott of Japanese goods after Japan's attack on China in 1937, and warning Canadians about Nazi Germany and fascist Italy. It was also involved in organizing support for Ethiopia when it was invaded by Italy.

In August 1937, the organization was renamed the Canadian League for Peace and Democracy. In early 1938, it co-sponsored, with the Communist Party, sending Dr. Norman Bethune's medical unit to China to provide battlefield medical services to the People's Liberation Army during the Second Sino-Japanese War.

On July 4, 1938, it organized a mass rally of at Maple Leaf Gardens in Toronto as a counterdemonstration against the founding rally of Adrien Arcand's fascist National Unity Party of Canada being held at Massey Hall at the same time. The CLPD's rally attracted 10,000 people compared to 2,500 who attended the fascist rally.

== Final years and dissolution ==
Though in 1938, CCF deputy leader M.J. Coldwell spoke at a League function, by the end of the year CCFers such as Douglas had left the organization due to the Communist Party's role and the appeal of the League declined.

MacLeod resigned as chairman on August 23, 1939, the day the announcement was made of the Molotov–Ribbentrop Pact, the non-aggression treaty between Josef Stalin's Soviet Union and Adolf Hitler's Nazi Germany which ended the Communist Party's anti-fascist activity until Nazi Germany invaded the Soviet Union in 1941. The league was banned in 1940, along with the Communist Party itself and other allied organizations, under the Defence of Canada Regulations.
