= League Against War and Fascism =

League Against War and Fascism may refer to:

- American League Against War and Fascism
- Canadian League Against War and Fascism
- World Committee Against War and Fascism
