= Canadian Nationalist Party =

The Canadian Nationalist Party may refer to:

- Canadian Nationalist Party (1933), a fascist party active from 1933 to 1938
- Canadian Nationalist Party (2017), a white nationalist party active from 2017 to 2022
- Nationalist Party of Canada, a white supremacist organization founded in 1977
