= Mexican Fascist Party =

Political party in Mexico (1922–1923)

Mexican Fascist Party Partido Fascista Mexicano
- Leader: Guillermo Pous; Manuel Calero
- Founder: Gustavo Sáenz de Sicilia
- Founded: 1922; 104 years ago
- Dissolved: 1923; 103 years ago
- Succeeded by: Confederación de la Clase Media
- Headquarters: Xalapa, Veracruz, Mexico
- Membership: 400 (early 1923 est.)
- Ideology: Fascism; Authoritarian conservatism
- Political position: Far-right
- Religion: Roman Catholicism
- Slogan: "Orden y Justicia" ("Order and Justice")

The Mexican Fascist Party (Partido Fascista Mexicano) was a very minor political party founded in Mexico City in December 1922 by Gustavo Sáenz de Sicilia. Officially based upon Italian Fascism, the party members drafted a manifesto entitled Manifiesto del Partido Fascista Mexicano a la Nación.

== History ==
The party was formed largely in opposition to the effects of the Mexican Revolution by urban and rural middle-class supporters who opposed socialism and agrarian reform who saw fascism as an alternative. The party's base of supporters were largely conservative, Catholic, and antirevolutionary.

The organization was established in Xalapa, Veracruz, approximately one month following the March on Rome, much to the displeasure of local politicians.

In an interview with Carleton Beals in February 1923, Sáenz de Sicilia claimed the party had amassed 100,000 members. This claim was exaggerated as membership for the party peaked at approximately 400 in early 1923.

Guillermo Pous, director of the Sindicato Nacional de Agricultores, was named leader of the party in April 1923. The party published a document entitled Principios fundamentales del Fascismo Nacional Mexicano dated April 3, 1923, that better defined the party's goals and principles. Manuel Calero was named the presidential candidate representing the party for the 1924 general election. However, members of the Mexican Fascist Party, including Pous, rapidly joined the National Political League, which supported Ángel Flores for president. The party rapidly became inactive and dissolved.

== Italian reception ==
An Italian ambassador in 1923 stated, "This party was not anything other than a bad imitation of ours and did not possess the causes of origin and the finalities of it. It, in fact, assumed the aspect of a political movement tending to gather in the whole country old conservative and Catholic forces dispersed by the revolution, and to form, in this way, a party clearly opposed to the actual government."
