= Ida Krehm =

Canadian-American pianist (1912–1998)

- Born: February 24, 1912; Toronto, Ontario, Canada
- Died: August 12, 1998 (aged 86); San José, Costa Rica
- Other name: Ida Pick
- Citizenship: Canadian; United States of America
- Education: Hambourg Conservatory
- Occupation: Pianist
- Spouse: Joseph Richard Pick (m. 1936; died 1955)
- Relatives: William Krehm (brother)

Ida Krehm (February 24, 1912 – August 12, 1998) was a Canadian-American pianist. She began playing the piano at the age of seven and studied at the Hamburg Conservatory. Krehm earned recognition as an orchestral soloist and recitalist with various symphony orchestras in the Americas and Europe. She also performed the role of a conductor-pianist and recorded the works of various composers. The Ida Krehm Memorial Scholarship was set up by her family at The Royal Conservatory of Music.

== Early life and education ==
On February 24, 1912, Krehm was born in Toronto, Canada. Her parents were modest Russian Jewish immigrants who had no background in music. Her parents, Sarah and Hyman Krehm, had emigrated separately from Russia to Canada between 1905 and 1910 and initially lived in Toronto's St. John's Ward, known as The Ward, a working class district that was home to successive waves of immigrants.

They later operated West End Retail Furriers, a fur dealership, and raised their children in an apartment above the store. The business struggled financially, and Hyman also worked at other jobs. Krehm had one younger brother, journalist William Krehm, who had been a promising violinist in his youth. She had early ambitions not centred around music and liked doing school work and doing watercolour and drawing. Artistry was discouraged by Krehm's parents and she spent more time doing music. When she turned seven years old, she began playing the piano and went to study under Norah Drewett de Kresz, Ernest Farmer and Viggo Kihl as well as theory with Healey Willan at the Hambourg Conservatory. Krehm also did heavy training in harmony following advice by Granville Bantock. She was regarded as a promising musician from childhood and studied at the Royal Conservatory of Music in Toronto before moving to Chicago in 1929 to study at the Chicago Musical College.

== Career ==
Upon first experiencing playing to a large audience, Krehm became further inclined to play music. From the ages of eleven to thirteen, she won each of the Canadian national competitions such as the Canadian National Exhibition three times (1923, 1924 and 1925) as well as the Ontario Musical Festival and the Welsh Eisteddfod in 1923 and 1924. Krehm made her first public concert appearance at a newspaper contest at Bloor Street United Church in 1924, and began teaching at age 13. She became a resident of the United States in 1929, moving to the Chicago to study under the Swiss conductor and pianist Rudolph Ganz at the Chicago Musical College.

Krehm won three national accolades over the course of three weeks in 1937. She earned the Schubert Memorial Award by making three appearances alongside the Philadelphia Orchestra, the cash prize of the National Federation of Music Clubs, and the Walter W. Naumburg Foundation Award on her debut in New York City at The Town Hall in December 1937. Krehm's professional debut in Canada came at the Hart House in the University of Toronto for the Women's Musical Club of Toronto on March 2, 1939.

She went on to earn more recognition as an orchestral soloist and a recitalist in the Americas with the Chicago Symphony Orchestra, the Cleveland Orchestra, the Detroit Symphony Orchestra, the Guatemala National Symphony Orchestra, the St. Louis Symphony Orchestra, the Toronto Symphony Orchestra, and in Europe with the London Philharmonic Orchestra and the Zurich Radio Orchestra. Krehm was made Bloch's selected soloist for his Scherzo fantasque with the Chicago Symphony Orchestra on December 2, 1950, and was the introducer of works by Jiri Antonin Benda, Norman Dello Joio, M.K. Čiurlionis, Rudolph Ganz, Carlos Surinach, Alexandre Tansman and Alexander Tcherepnin.

In 1962, Krehm made her debut as a pianist-conductor in Hilversum, the Netherlands and went on to repeat this role with London's English Chamber Orchestra and Melos Ensemble and the CBC Symphony Orchestra in Toronto. She also performed this role in Berlin, Trondheim in Norway and at the 1976 Oriveto Festival. Krehm commissioned the 1977 Concertino by Srul Irving Glick she wrote for her to play on the keyboard. She recorded the works of various composers such as Robert Schumann, Pyotr Ilyich Tchaikovsky, Alexander Scriabin among others.

== Personal life ==
She was married to Joseph Richard Pick from 1936 until his death from getting an overdose of radioactive iodine in 1955. On August 12, 1998, Krehm died from cardiac arrest in San José, Costa Rica. She was buried in the country and a memorial service was held for her at the St. George's Society of Toronto on August 30.

== Character and legacy ==
Wilson L. Taylor in 1938 described Krehm as having "a trim figure" and "a pleasant personality". Reed Hynds wrote of Krehm's playing technique: "She had a comprehensive technique which expressed itself in flying fingers under rigid control, a sense of total color which was capable of minute dynamic adjustments, and an intellectual grasp which kept every phrase subordinate to her conception of the work as a whole."

According to Betty Nygaard King and Eleanor Kodofsky in Krehm's entry in The Canadian Encyclopedia, the pianist's work was identified "by high competence and a questing intelligence". The Ida Krehm Memorial Scholarship was set up by her family at The Royal Conservatory of Music. She was profiled on CBC Radio in March 1999.
