= Edmund Burke Society =

Edmund Burke Society may refer to:

- The Edmund Burke Society (Toronto), a far-right organization in Toronto, Canada (1967-1972).
- Conservative debating societies on college campuses such as the University of Chicago Law School, the University of Virginia and the London School of Economics, named after Edmund Burke
