= Canadian Union of Fascists =

- Leader: Chuck Crate
- Founder: Howard Simpkin
- Founded: 28 June 1934
- Banned: 5 June 1940
- Split from: Canadian Nationalist Party
- Newspaper: Thunderbolt
- Membership: 8,000 (claimed)
- Ideology: Fascism
- Political position: Far-right
- International affiliation: British Union of Fascists

The Canadian Union of Fascists was a fascist political party based in the city of Toronto in the 1930s with its western Canadian office in Regina, Saskatchewan.

The party was founded in Winnipeg, Manitoba in the summer of 1934 as the British Empire Union of Fascists by Canadian supporters of Oswald Mosley's British Union of Fascists after BUF member Hubert Cox visited the city in June 1934, claiming to be Mosley's representative. The first leader was Howard Simpkin, a former lieutenant to Canadian Nationalist Party leader William Whittaker who led a group of people breaking away from the CNP, objecting to the party's racialism, declaring that "anti-semitism was a symptom of Germany not of Fascism", and advocated a more economic-oriented program instead built around the fascist economic policies of Mussolini's Italy such as corporatism. The new party attracted around 200 people to its inaugural meeting on June 28, 1934, to hear Cox and Simpkin address the crowd. It soon changed its name to the Canadian Union of Fascists (or Canadian Union) and within a year had branches in Transcona, Manitoba, Toronto and Woodstock, Ontario, Regina, Saskatchewan, and Vancouver. It was also known as the Canadian Fascist Party.

In Toronto a young high school student Charles "Chuck" Crate joined the party after contacting the British Union of Fascists and being put in touch with CUF. He became the Toronto branch director and soon began recruiting members at York Memorial Collegiate Institute and elsewhere in Toronto. Crate edited the party's newspaper, The Thunderbolt, in Toronto and soon displaced Simpkin as party leader.

The party had a hard time attracting supporters because most Canadians who supported fascism leaned towards the racist brand espoused by Adrien Arcand and others.

By 1936, The Globe was describing Crate in a front page headline as "Canada's No. 1 Fascist" leading a party that claimed 8,000 members, with 30 members in Toronto and many more "scattered" throughout Western Canada. The party's platform was described as consisting of the "abolition of provincial governments and private monopolies, with a closer co-operation with Great Britain and the Empire". Canada would be as "self-contained" as possible, and would work with the British Union of Fascists to make the British Empire "completely self-contained". Crate denied any connection between the CUF and Italian or German fascist groups though admitted being in correspondence with them. He admitted the CUF was affiliated with Oswald Mosley's British Union of Fascists. The party had its greatest number of members in Saskatchewan according to Crate, where Dr. R. Muir Johnstone was based as the party's Western Canadian organizer. The party planned to run candidates in the next Saskatchewan provincial election, though it did not end up doing so, and in federal elections. The CUF claimed it would solve unemployment and poverty by creating a corporate state with a "authoritative government" and provincial governments being abolished. Private ownership would be maintained, but would be "co-ordinated", and chain stores would be abolished in favour of independent stores. Monetary reform would "liberate the state from the bonds of international Jewish finance." Crate also claimed that under the "corporate state", "married women will be compelled to retire from industry. Competition between men and women in industry will be done away with." The party, while claiming not to oppose people on "racial" or "religious grounds", advocated a "more selective immigration policy".

In 1937, Crate's CUF formed an alliance with John Ross Taylor's National Christian Party. The NCP had been founded by Taylor in alliance with Adrien Arcand's Parti national social chrétien. However, Taylor broke with Arcand over religious differences and Taylor's National Christian Party formed an alliance with the CUF with Crate being cross-appointed as the NCF's secretary. By 1938, Taylor had dissolved the NCF into the CUF, becoming the CUF's secretary and organizer.

This disparity between the party and Arcand's group would continue throughout the party's existence. Before the government took action against Canadian fascist parties, the Canadian Union of Fascists and Arcand's group held simultaneous fascist congresses in Toronto in early June 1938. Taylor organized the CUF's rally and had intended to book Massey Hall but switched venue's to the smaller Prince's Hall on Bloor Street when it became clear the CUF would not be able to attract a large enough crowd to fill Massey Hall. Only 26 people attended the CUF rally, while 200 to 300 anti-fascists protested outside at a counterdemonstration organized by William Krehm's Provisional Anti-Fascist Committee. Meanwhile, Arcand's rally officially launching the National Unity Party of Canada drew a crowd of around 2,500 to Massey Hall on July 4, 1938. While the National Unity Party was a merger of Arcand's Parti national social chrétien and the Canadian National Party, the Canadian Union of Fascists did not join the new party.

The party, though it claimed not to be racist or antisemitic, did use antisemitic rhetoric with Thunderbolt publishing articles against "international Jewish finance" which it claimed "controlled Communism", as well as reprinting articles by Joseph Goebbels.

The CUF was banned on June 4, 1940, under the Defence of Canada Regulations and formally dissolved itself, telling its members to obey the law but to work for a negotiated peace. Crate escaped a treason charge but remained active in Winnipeg, publishing Thunderbolt from there until his arrest in 1942 for publishing subversive literature. He ended up in the Royal Canadian Navy at the end of the war.

== See also ==
- Fascism in Canada
- List of political parties in Canada
