= By-elections to the 28th Canadian Parliament =

Commons polling

By-elections to the 28th Canadian Parliament were held to fill vacancies in the House of Commons of Canada between the 1968 federal election and the 1972 federal election. The Liberal Party of Canada led a majority government for the entirety of the 29th Canadian Parliament, though their number did decrease from by-elections.

Fifteen seats became vacant during the life of the Parliament. Eleven of these vacancies were filled through by-elections, and four seats remained vacant when the 1972 federal election was called.

By-election	Date	Incumbent	Party	Winner	Party	Cause	Retained
Assiniboia	November 8, 1971	Albert B. Douglas	Liberal	Bill Knight	New Democratic	Death	No
Central Nova	May 31, 1971	Russell MacEwan	Progressive Conservative	Elmer M. MacKay	Progressive Conservative	Resignation	Yes
Brant	May 31, 1971	James Elisha Brown	Liberal	Derek Blackburn	New Democratic	Appointed a judge	No
Chambly	May 31, 1971	Bernard Pilon	Liberal	Yvon L'Heureux	Liberal	Death	Yes
Trois-Rivières	May 31, 1971	Joseph-Alfred Mongrain	Liberal	Claude Lajoie	Liberal	Death	Yes
Lisgar	November 6, 1970	George Muir	Progressive Conservative	Jack Murta	Progressive Conservative	Death	Yes
Frontenac	November 6, 1970	Bernard Dumont	Ralliement Créditiste	Léopold Corriveau	Liberal	Resignation	No
Labelle	November 6, 1970	Léo Cadieux	Liberal	Maurice Dupras	Liberal	Appointed Ambassador to France	Yes
Selkirk	April 13, 1970	Edward Schreyer	New Democratic	Doug Rowland	New Democratic	Resignation	Yes
Comox—Alberni	April 8, 1969	Richard J. J. Durante	Liberal	Thomas Speakman Barnett	New Democratic	Election declared void	No
Nanaimo—Cowichan—The Islands	February 10, 1969	Colin Cameron	New Democratic	Tommy C. Douglas	New Democratic	Death	Yes

== See also ==
- List of federal by-elections in Canada

== Sources ==
- Parliament of Canada–Elected in By-Elections
