= Gustavo Sáenz de Sicilia =

Mexican silent film director and producer (1885–1950)

Gustavo Sáenz de Sicilia Olivares
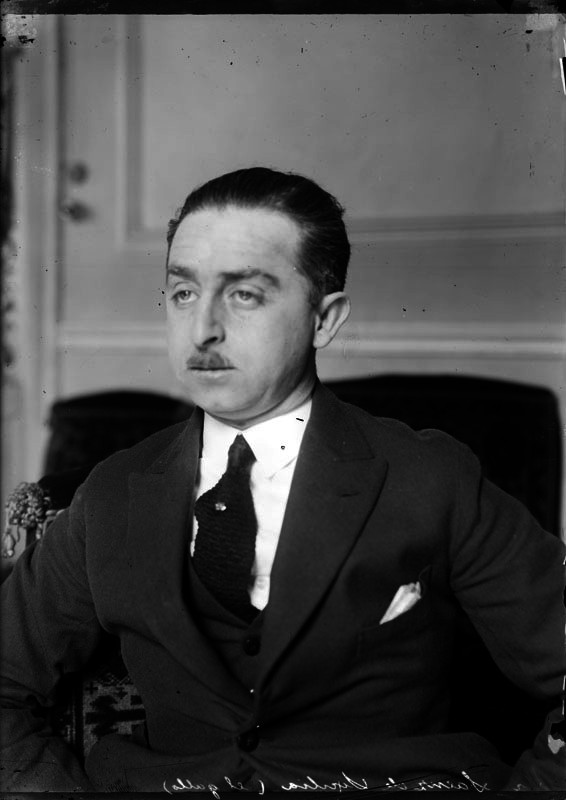
- Sáenz de Sicilia circa 1922
- Born: November 25, 1885; Mexico City, Mexico
- Died: January 15, 1950 (aged 64); Mexico City, Mexico
- Occupation: Film producer
- Years active: 1923-1937
- Known for: Founder of Mexican Fascist Party
- Notable work: Santa; Prisoner 13
- Spouse: Elisa Urruchua Carmona

Gustavo Sáenz de Sicilia Olivares (November 25, 1885 – January 15, 1950) was a Mexican silent film director, producer, journalist, civil engineer, and founder of Compañía Nacional Productora de Películas. Sáenz de Sicilia is regarded as an important figure during the silent era of Mexican cinema as well as a key influence for the Golden Age of Mexican cinema. Throughout his life, he wrote for Excélsior under the pen name Ingeniero Gallo.

A staunch anti-communist, Sáenz de Sicilia was also politically active. He founded the short lived Mexican Fascist Party as well as the far-right Confederation of the Middle Class (Spanish: Confederación de la Clase Media or CCM) organization in the 1920s and 1930s respectively.

== Early life ==
Gustavo Sáenz de Sicilia was born to Jesús Sáenz de Sicilia Aguilar and Maria Luisa Olivares Garces. His family were very wealthy aristocratics with close ties to the Porfiriato government.

He studied at the Heroic Military Academy. After graduating, Sáenz de Sicilia studied civil engineering abroad in many different countries.

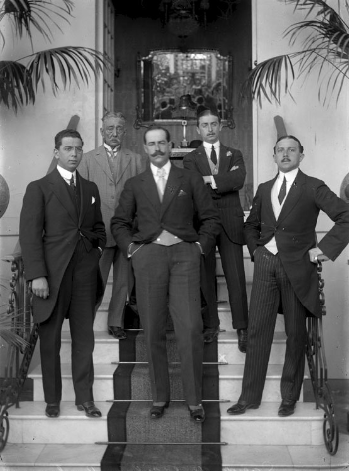
Sáenz de Sicilia (second from right) with Rafael Alducin (far left) and Alberto Braniff (center)

Sáenz de Sicilia fought during the Mexican Revolution in the 1910s on the side of the Huertistas. According to Valentín Campa, he took part in the assassination of Gustavo A. Madero while under the command of Victoriano Huerta.

Sáenz de Sicilia was an assistant to the Secretariat of Foreign Affairs during the Obregón presidency before being let go for "personal differences" in the early 1920s.

== Film career ==
Sáenz de Sicilia began his silent film career in 1922 co-directing Aguiluchos Mexicanos with Miguel Contreras Torres.

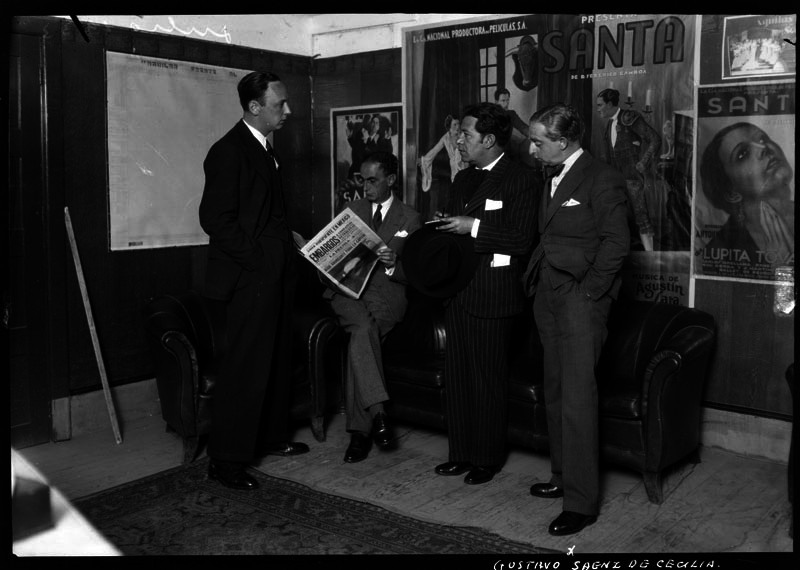
Sáenz de Sicilia (far right) in the office of Productora de Películas Nacionales in 1934.

Sáenz de Sicilia produced as well as made his directorial debut with Atavismo, released in 1923.

In late 1928, Sáenz de Sicilia, along with his brother Enrique, founded the film production company Compañía Productora de Películas Nacionales S.C.L. with the motive to revitalize the Mexican film industry. The first film the company produced was La boda de Rosario starring Carlos Rincón Gallardo, written and directed by Sáenz de Sicilia himself.

In 1930, he founded a film editorial entitled Filmográfico later named Cinema Reporter.

In 1932, the production company released Santa starring Lupita Tovar. The film was a massive success.

In February 1936, Sáenz de Sicilia filmed an anti-communist rally in Monterrey entitled Manifestación anticomunista de Monterrey. The film was barred from showing by the Regional Confederation of Mexican Workers. Following this incident, Sáenz de Sicilia retired from directing.

== Political activity ==
=== Mexican Fascist Party ===
Gustavo Sáenz de Sicilia founded the Mexican Fascist Party in December 1922, drafting the party's manifesto titled Manifiesto del Partido Fascista Mexicano a la Nación a month later. The party set out to empower the middle class and counteract Bolshevik and communist influence in Mexico. Sáenz de Sicilia announced in February 1923 that membership of the party had reached 100,000 members and discussed the possibility of the party reaching over a million members in six months time, a wildly exaggerated claim as membership of the party never exceed 400. In April, Sáenz de Sicilia had told Carleton Beals there were 150,000 members in the fascist party. In reality, the party never had a significant number of members and dissolved sometime in mid 1923.

=== Middle Class Confederation ===
On June 19, 1936, Sáenz de Sicilia, along with his brother Enrique, founded the Middle Class Confederation (Spanish: Confederación de la Clase Media or CCM). The group was characterized to be far-right, fascist, and vehemently anti-communist.

The primary objective of the group, according to Sáenz de Sicilia, was to constitute a social defense and unity among the middle class as he considered the middle class in Mexico to have lacked rights and social protection in Mexico. An objective of the CCM was to unite with the Nationalist Mexican Youth, the Nationalist Association of Small Agricultural Owners, the National Civic Action and the National Pro-Race Committee groups.

The group was heavily opposed to the government structure set forth by Lázaro Cárdenas as well as the nationwide labor strikes which were occurring during this period. The group worked closely with other right-wing organizations including the Revolutionary Mexicanist Action paramilitary.

The party was estimated to have between 30 and 40 members, a considerate number of them had been members of the Revolutionary Mexicanist Action. Most members resided in very upscale neighborhoods including Colonia Santa María la Ribera.

In August 1936, Sáenz de Sicilia was arrested along with eight others for displaying Revolutionary Mexicanist Action propaganda in Mexico City.

In 1937, the organization tried unsuccessfully to organize an Ibero-American anti-communist conference in Havana. This drew interest and support from representatives of the fascist governments of Germany, Italy and Spain.

The CCM became much more inactive sometime in 1939. This followed the government's crackdown on right-wing organizations after Saturnino Cedillo's rebellion in 1938. Members of the CCM helped establish the Revolutionary Party of National Unification, supporting Juan Andreu Almazán's presidential bid in 1940. The CCM supported Almazán's campaign in exchange for financial support, however, the money was never delivered.

The organization dissolved with little money and with insignificant political power at the beginning of the Camacho presidency.

== Personal life ==
Gustavo Sáenz de Sicilia was a descendant of a powerful Spanish 17th-century priest and farmer who was given plots of land by the Spanish crown near both Popocatépetl and Iztaccihuatl.

Sáenz de Sicilia died in Mexico City on January 15, 1950, of a cerebral hemorrhage.

== Selected filmography ==
Table featuring feature films by Gustavo Sáenz de Sicilia, does not include his documentaries.
Year	Title	Director	Writer	Producer	Notes	Ref.
1923	Atavismo	Yes	Yes	Yes		
1926	Un drama en la aristocracia	Yes	Yes	Yes		
1929	La boda de Rosario	Yes	Yes	Yes		
1932	Santa	No	No	Yes	Also credited as Production Management	
1932	Una vida por otra	No	Yes	No	Co-written along with John H. Auer and Carlos Noriega Hope	
1933	El prisionero trece	No	No	Yes		
1938	La cuna vacía	No	Yes	No	Co-written along with Miguel Zacarías	
1949	Rondalla	No	Yes	No	Based on Sáenz de Sicilia's Están Llorando los Trigales	
