= America y Oriente =

Political magazine in Argentina (1952–1956)

- Editor: Issa Nakhle
- Categories: Political magazine
- Founder: Issa Nakhleh
- Founded: 1952
- First issue: 20 November 1952
- Final issue: 1956
- Country: Argentina
- Based in: Buenos Aires
- Language: Spanish

America y Oriente was a short lived political journal that was published in Buenos Aires, Argentina. The journal was founded by Issa Nakhleh in 1952, and the first issue appeared on 20 November 1952. It was a publication of the Arab League in Argentina. The founder, Issa Nakhleh (1915–2003), was a Christian Palestinian (at times representing Muslim Congress) His purpose in establishing the journal was to improve and reinforce Arab–Latin American exchanges about mutual anti-imperialist agendas.
