= Chuck Crate =

Canadian fascist leader, artist, and lexicographer

Charles Brandle Crate (January 26, 1915 – March 7, 1992) was a Canadian fascist who was the leader of the Canadian Union of Fascists.

== Fascist politics ==
Crate became leader of the Canadian Union of Fascists while a student at York Memorial Collegiate Institute, in a working class suburb of Toronto. He had contacted the British Union of Fascists, who put him in touch with BUF supporters in Canada organised in the Winnipeg-based CUF. Crate became editor of the party's newspaper, Thunderbolt and soon became leader. By 1936, the CUF claimed a membership of 8,000 people and The Globe newspaper described the then 21-year-old Crate as "Canada's No. 1 Fascist".

The party was banned on June 4, 1940, under the Defence of Canada Regulations but Crate avoided internment by signing a declaration severing his connections with the CUF. However, by 1942, Crate had moved to Winnipeg and was editing The Thunderbolt there, blaming the conditions of the time on Jews, the Roman Catholic Church and the Masonic Order.

In response to a question in the Canadian House of Commons by MP Dorise Nielsen, Minister of Justice Louis St. Laurent told parliament on June 30, 1943, that Crate had signed a declaration at the beginning of World War II severing his connections of the Canadian Union of Fascists. He was arrested in Edmonton, Alberta on June 21, 1943, and charged with advocating the policies of an illegal organization, namely the Canadian Union of Fascists. Nielsen also expressed concerns that Crate had been given a permit to join the construction crew of the Alaska Highway, a crucial wartime project.
