= Defence of Canada Regulations =

1939 Canadian laws which limited citizens' personal and property rights during WWII

The Defence of Canada Regulations were a set of emergency measures implemented under the War Measures Act on 3 September 1939, a week before Canada's entry into World War II.

== Overview ==
The extreme security measures permitted by the regulations included the waiving of habeas corpus and the right to trial, internment, bans on certain political and cultural groups, restrictions of free speech including the banning of certain publications, and the confiscation of property.

Section 21 of the Regulations allowed the Minister of Justice to detain without charge anyone who might act "in any manner prejudicial to the public safety or the safety of the state."

The Regulations were used to intern opponents of World War II, particularly fascists (like Adrien Arcand) and Communists (including Jacob Penner, Bruce Magnuson and Tom McEwen) as well as opponents of conscription such as Quebec nationalist and Montreal mayor Camillien Houde. It was under the regulations that Japanese Canadians were interned and their property confiscated for the duration of the war. German Canadians were required to register with the state and some German and Italian Canadians were detained.

The Regulations were also used to ban the Communist Party of Canada in 1940 as well as several of its allied organizations such as the Young Communist League, the Canadian Labour Defence League, the Canadian League for Peace and Democracy, the Ukrainian Labour Farmer Temple Association, the Finnish Organization of Canada, the Russian Workers and Farmers Clubs, the Polish Peoples Association and the Croatian Cultural Association, the Hungarian Workers Clubs and the Canadian Ukrainian Youth Federation. Various fascist groups were also banned such as the National Unity Party and the Canadian Union of Fascists as well as numerous ethnic German associations linked with the Nazi Party. Non-communist labour leaders like Charles Millard were also interned. In 1942, the Canadian Youth Congress was banned.

A number of prominent Communist Party members were detained until 1942, the year after the Soviet Union joined the Allies. Fascist leaders such as Adrien Arcand and John Ross Taylor were detained for the duration of the war.
