= Canadian Nationalist Party (1933) =

- Leader: William Whittaker
- Founded: September 1933
- Dissolved: July 1938
- Merged into: National Unity Party of Canada
- Newspaper: Canadian Nationalist
- Ideology: Fascism (Canadian); Antisemitism
- Political position: Far-right

The Canadian Nationalist Party was a fascist, antisemitic party founded in Winnipeg, Manitoba, by William Whittaker, a British ex-soldier who had served with the British Army in India, and a dozen other European war veterans, in September 1933. The party initially claimed it was for equality of all citizens, but Whittaker was soon condemning Jews in his speeches at public rallies and in the party's newspaper, The Canadian Nationalist, and its other propaganda, leading to opponents confronting him at his rallies and being violently removed, often by police. The organization was modelled on Nazi stormtroopers and repeatedly marched through Winnipeg's streets wearing khaki shirts, light brown breeches, and riding boots. Whittaker's lieutenant, Harry Simkins, and other CNP members dissatisfied with Whittaker's leadership, left in 1934 to form the British Empire Union of Fascists (which soon became the Canadian Union of Fascists).

An Anti-Fascist League was formed to confront Whittaker and on June 5, 1934, a riot, referred to as the Battle at Old Market Square occurred when 500 anti-fascists confronted 100 or so fascists.

In response to the CNP's antisemitic propaganda, the Manitoba legislature passed The Manitoba Defamation Act, the first group libel law in Canada, which allowed a member of a racial or religious group that was being defamed to sue the author or publisher for a halt in the production of material. "The plaintiff did not have to prove that he was being affected personally; it was sufficient cause that his race or religion was being defamed." Introduced by Independent Labour Party MLA Marcus Hyman, the legislature passed the bill into law by a unanimous vote in 1934.

The CNP's Ontario chairman was Joseph C. Farr, a white Protestant immigrant from Northern Ireland who had been involved in Toronto's "Swastika Clubs", which had provoked the Christie Pits riot in 1934. As Whittaker's health declined in the late 1930s, Farr became increasingly prominent.

In October 1934, the Canadian Nationalist Party allied with Adrien Arcand's Parti national social chrétien du Canada to form the "National Union" and in July 1938, it merged with Arcand's party and several other fascist parties to form the National Unity Party of Canada.

Whittaker died on October 26, 1938, at the age of 63, his health having declined since suffering a stroke in March.

== See also ==
- Fascism in Canada
- List of political parties in Canada
