= National Unity Party of Canada =

Far-right political party in Canada

National Unity Party of Canada Parti de l'unité nationale du Canada
- Abbreviation: NUPC (English); PUNC (French)
- Leader: Adrien Arcand
- Founded: February 22, 1934 (as the PNSC); July 1938 (as the National Unity Party)
- Dissolved: July 27, 2016 (Note: Date of deregistration as a private enterprise with the Government of Quebec)
- Merger of: Several fascist groups, notably the PNSC
- Headquarters: 7337 Chemin Parkinson; Rawdon, Quebec; J0K 1S0
- Newspaper: The Canadian Nationalist (English); Le Combat National (French)
- Paramilitary wing: Blueshirts
- Membership: 100,000 (claimed in 1938); 1,500-1,800 (estimated in 1938)
- Ideology: Neo-Nazism; Neo-fascism; White nationalism; Before 1945: Nazism; Fascism (classical)
- Political position: Far-right
- Religion: Christianity
- Slogan: "Canada for Canadians"

The National Unity Party of Canada (NUPC) (Note: French: Parti de l'unité nationale du Canada, abbr. PUNC) was a Canadian far-right political party which based its ideology on Adolf Hitler's Nazism and Benito Mussolini's fascism. It was founded as the Parti national social chrétien du Canada (PNSC) (Note: Translated as the "National Social Christian Party of Canada", this English name was never used by the party. The concurrent English name was the "Christian National Socialist Party" and then briefly the "National Christian Party of Canada".) by Nazi sympathizer Adrien Arcand on February 22, 1934. The party's activities were originally limited to Quebec, but it later expanded to Ontario and Western Canada. Party membership swelled in the mid-to-late 1930s as the party absorbed smaller fascist groups across the country. Following the outbreak of World War II, the Canadian government banned the NUPC on May 30, 1940, under the Defence of Canada Regulations of the War Measures Act. Arcand and many of his followers were consequently arrested and interned for the duration of the war.

The ban on the NUPC was lifted following the war's end in 1945, and the party resumed its activities shortly afterwards. However, its public presence greatly diminished after the war and all but disappeared following Arcand's death in 1967. The 1949 federal election was the only election ever contested by the NUPC; Arcand ran in the Quebec riding of Richelieu—Verchères and placed second, receiving just over 29 percent of the vote.

== History ==
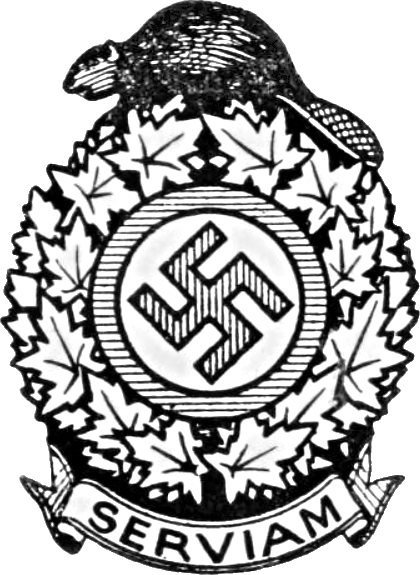
Logo, emblem and flag of the PNSC, based on those of the Nazi Party

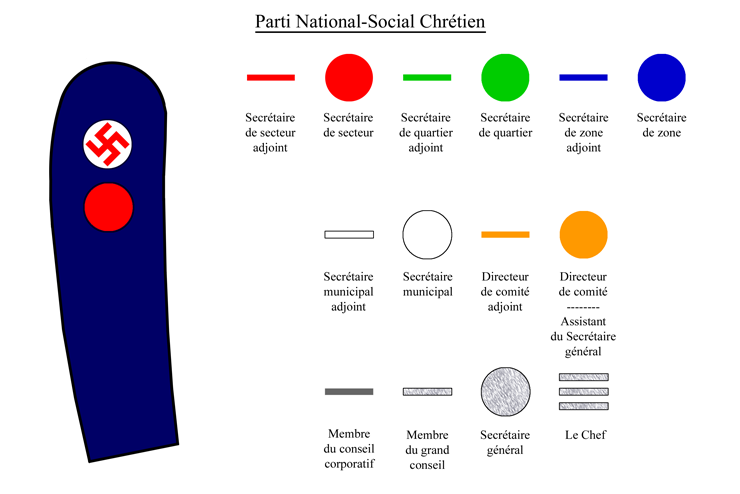
Rank insignia of the Blueshirts

Arcand founded the Parti national social chrétien du Canada (PNSC) on February 22, 1934. It was known as the "Christian National Socialist Party" in English. A fascist and antisemite, Arcand described Jews in Canada as "cockroaches and insects", decried liberal democracy as a "Jewish invention" and lauded Hitler as the "saviour of Christianity". Arcand looked toward Nazi Germany and Fascist Italy for ideological inspiration. His supporters referred to him as the "Canadian Führer", a reference to the title held by Hitler.

The Canadian Nationalist Party, a fascist group based in the Prairie provinces by the mid-1930s claimed to have a few thousand members, mainly concentrated in Quebec, British Columbia and Alberta, worked closely with the PNSC after 1934. The PNSC later expanded into Ontario and changed its English name to the "National Christian Party of Canada".

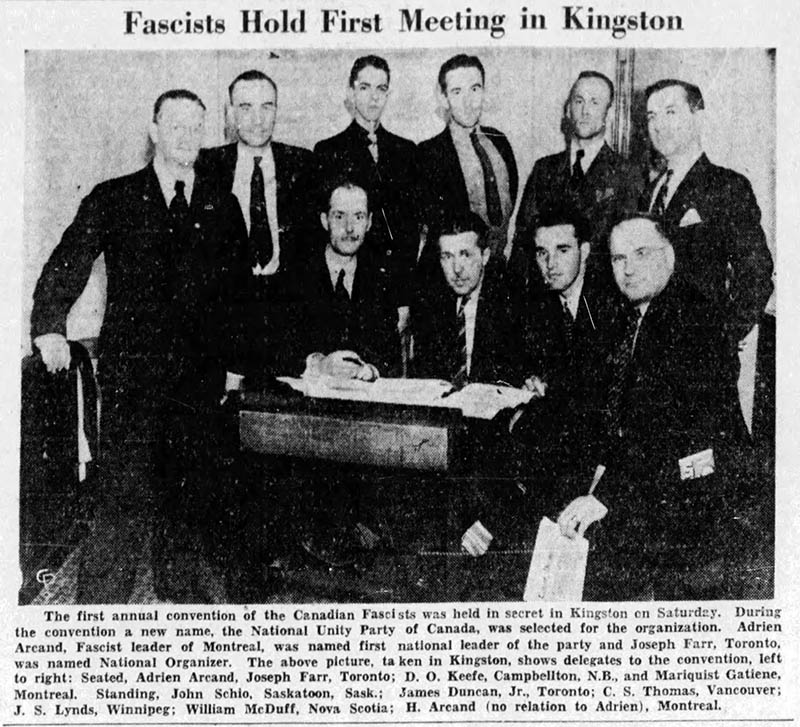
Excerpt from the July 5, 1938, issue of the Kingston Whig-Standard. Arcand is in the front row, seated farthest to the left.

On July 2, 1938, fascist groups from across Canada attended a conference hosted by the PNSC at Forester's Hall in Toronto, though the groups claimed to have met in Kingston, Ontario in defiance of a ban by Kingston City Council. Delegates then drove to Kingston and took pictures of themselves to release to the press "for no other purpose than to claim they had successfully met in that city in defiance of the city council". The attendees agreed to unite under a single organization and consequently established the National Unity Party of Canada (NUPC). Arcand announced that "a flaming torch [would] be the new party's emblem, 'Canada for Canadians' its slogan, the upraised arm its salute and 'King, Country and Christianity' its program." At a time of mounting English-French Canadian tension, Arcand hoped to unite the two groups and create a white nationalist movement under the leadership of the NUPC. Arcand was affirmed as the new party's leader and Joseph C. Farr, the Ontario chairman of the Canadian Nationalist Party, became the NUPC's secretary. At this point, CNP leader William Whittaker was in declining health, having suffered a stroke in March 1938. He would die by the end of the year.

Following the conference, Arcand and Farr held a rally at Massey Hall attended by around 2,500 people with the NUP newspaper, Le Combat National claiming that 850 people joined the NUP on the spot. Arcand was accompanied by 85 "Blueshirts", armed members of the NUPC's paramilitary force. The anti-fascist Canadian League for Peace and Democracy simultaneously held a counter-rally of 10,000 people at Maple Leaf Gardens in opposition to the NUPC. A smaller protest of up to 800 people was organized by William Krehm and the Provisional Anti-Fascist Committee resulting in several arrests. The NUPC described the anti-fascists as "the Jews and the organizations that they control", "Judeo-communist forces", and "the forces of Israel and Moscow", claiming that the protestors had planned to enter the meeting and break it up by force.

The outbreak of World War II prompted the Canadian government to ban the NUPC on May 30, 1940, under the Defence of Canada Regulations of the War Measures Act. Arcand and many of his followers were consequently arrested and interned for the duration of the war. The party resumed its activities after its ban was lifted following the end of the war in 1945.

Arcand contested the 1949 federal election in the Quebec riding of Richelieu—Verchères as a candidate for the NUPC. He placed second, receiving 5,590 votes (29.1 per cent of the total). He came in second again with 39 per cent of the vote when he ran as a "Nationalist" in Berthier—Maskinongé—Delanaudière in the 1953 federal election.

The NUPC's last known event was a banquet held in honour of Arcand on November 14, 1965, inside Montreal's Paul Sauvé Arena. About 800 to 850 attendees toasted the sickly Arcand, who had prepared a final speech praising his "loyal student" Gérard Lanctôt. By December 1966, Arcand had become bedridden by insomnia and edema; his condition worsened in April 1967 and he suffered from severe pain in his larynx. Arcand died shortly afterwards on August 1, 1967. His funeral was held at a church in Lanoraie and attended by hundreds of his supporters, many of whom gave Arcand a final Roman salute. Lanctôt subsequently inherited Arcand's position as leader of the NUPC, a position which he held until his death in 2003.

The NUPC was registered as a private enterprise with the Government of Quebec from March 13, 1978, to July 27, 2016.

== Election results ==
Election	Leader	Seats	Votes	%	Rank	Outcome
1949	Adrien Arcand	0 / 262	5,590	0.1%	12th	No seats

== See also ==
- Fascism in Canada
