= Adrien Arcand =

Canadian fascist (1899–1967)

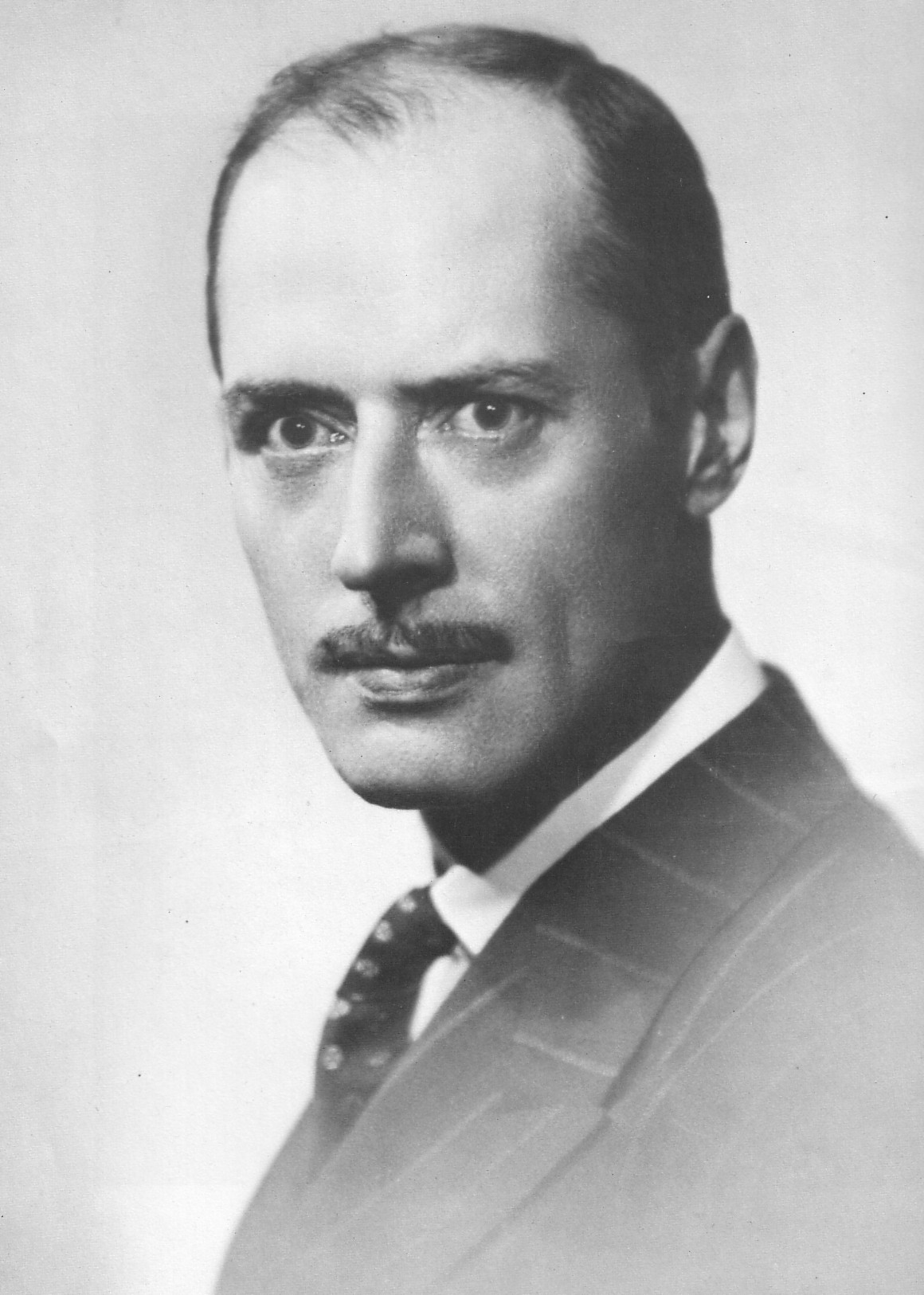
- Arcand in 1933
- Born: October 3, 1899; Montreal, Quebec, Canada
- Died: August 1, 1967 (aged 67); Montreal, Quebec, Canada
- Education: College de St. Jean d'Iberville; Collège Saint-Stanislas; Collège de Montréal; McGill University
- Political party: National Unity Party
- Movement: Canadian fascist movement
- Relatives: Denys Arcand (great-nephew)

Adrien Arcand (October 3, 1899 – August 1, 1967) was a Canadian fascist politician, writer, and journalist. He founded and led the far-right National Unity Party of Canada from 1934 until his death in 1967. During his political career, he proclaimed himself as the "Canadian Führer".

Arcand was detained by the federal government for the duration of World War II under the Defence of Canada Regulations.

== Early years ==
Arcand was the son of Narcisse-Joseph-Philias Arcand, who was a carpenter and trade union official, and Marie-Anne (Mathieu). He is also the great-uncle of the movie director, Denys Arcand. Arcand was born into a family of 12 children and grew up in a house on Laurier street in Montreal. Narcisse Arcand was active in the Labour Party that advocated free education, old age pensions, health insurance and universal suffrage. The appeal of the Labour Party in Quebec was resisted by the Catholic Church, which was powerful at the time in Quebec, as priests instructed their congregations not to vote for the Labour Party. Though the Labour Party stated it was open to all, the party's rules explicitly banned Asians from joining, and the party's policies advocated the "absolute prohibition of Chinese immigration" to Canada, as Asians were considered economic competitors of the Caucasian working class. Although the number of Chinese immigrants to Quebec was small—the 1901 census showed there were 1,648,898 people living in Quebec of whom only 1,037 were Chinese immigrants—their presence was sufficient to cause the formation of an "Anti-Yellow Peril League" many of whose members were also members of the Labour Party. Narcisse Arcand was very active in lobbying against Asian immigration, testifying in 1909 before the Royal Commission on Education, as long as Asian immigration continued, it would be impossible for the white working class to advance economically. From advocating a ban of Asian immigration to advocating a ban of all immigration was not a great difference, and soon Arcand was arguing for the cessation of all immigration. Arcand's son inherited his father's belief that immigration was a threat. However, Montreal at the time had a large English-speaking minority, and Adrien Arcand recalled later that he "was raised in an atmosphere not conducive to separatist and Anglophobic sentiments" as he knew many English-speakers as he was growing up and came to speak English fluently.

Though Narcisse Arcand was often at odds with the Catholic Church, all of his children were educated in Catholic schools (Quebec did not have a public education system until 1964 and all schools prior to 1964 were managed by churches). Adrien Arcand was educated at the College de St. Jean d'Iberville, Collège Saint-Stanislas and Collège de Montréal in Montreal. He received the standard 8-year collège classique education emphasizing French, Latin, Greek, religion, mathematics, classic literature, and French history. Arcand considered studying to be a priest, but changed his mind as "weakness" made a life of celibacy unappealing to him. The Collège de Montréal was managed by the Sulpician monks, who had been active in Quebec since the 17th century, and most of the Sulpicians at the college were from France. Many Quebecois thought of themselves at the time as the last remnant of the Catholic ancien-regime France that had been ended by the French Revolution, and Arcand's education at the Catholic schools emphasised royalist and Catholic values. The Sulpicians from France tended to be hostile to French republicanism and many had relocated to Quebec, a society dominated by the Catholic Church, because it was considerably closer to their idealized version of ancien-régime France than the French Third Republic was.

== Journalism and rise to prominence ==
By Arcand's own account, his education by the Sulpicians at the Collège de Montréal was "decisive" in shaping his opinions. In 1918, he studied science as a part-time student at McGill University, but the great "Spanish influenza" pandemic of 1918–1919 resulted in the closure of public places after the disease arrived during October 1918 including all theaters, cinemas, concert halls, libraries, schools, meeting halls and hockey arenas in Montreal. During the closures, Arcand wrote to help ease his boredom. Several articles he submitted to newspapers were published, beginning his interest in journalism. In 1919, he was hired by the newspaper La Patrie and in 1920 he began to write a weekly column dealing with labour issues. In 1921, he began work for the Montreal Star, reporting the news in English. After that he began work for La Presse, the largest newspaper in Quebec. A keen amateur violin player, Arcand worked as a music critic for La Presse. As Montreal was the largest and wealthiest city in Canada at the time, many famous musicians such as Ignacy Paderewski often played at concerts in Montreal, and Arcand was there to interview him.

In addition to Paderewski, Arcand's work as a reporter for La Presse allowed him to interview many famous people during the 1920s when they visited Montreal such as the Canadian prime minister William Lyon Mackenzie King, Anna Pavlova, Vincent d'Indy, Vladimir de Pachmann, Alfred Cortot, Feodor Chaliapin, Cécile Sorel, Jascha Heifetz, Isadora Duncan, Mario Chamlee, Queen Marie of Romania, Jacques Thibaud, Stanley Baldwin, Fritz Kreisler, Douglas Fairbanks, Maurice de Féraudy, Tom Mix, Mary Pickford, Efrem Zimbalist and Lord Birkenhead. In 1923, he joined a militia unit named the Châteauguay Regiment (whose traditions are continued by the 4th Battalion of the Royal 22nd Regiment). On April 14, 1925, he married Yvonne Giguère. During the late 1920s, he became active in organizing for Catholic trade unions and became president of the first union local at La Presse. His trade unionism caused him to be dismissed in 1929. Arcand later recalled that his dismissal came as "a surprise, cruel and hard, with the result that my wife and my young babies suffered the effects of painful, abject poverty". For a time, the water and electricity to his home was terminated due to his inability to pay the bills. Arcand's dismissal gave a lifelong grudge against his former employer, Pamphile Réal Du Tremblay, and caused him to found a new newspaper, Le Goglu, in August 1929. His sudden transition from the respectable lower middle-class to poverty radicalized him.

Arcand was assisted in founding Le Goglu by a printer, Joseph Ménard, who wanted to begin his own newspaper. In joual (Quebec French), goglu is slang for someone who is jovial and who loves to laugh, and Le Goglu belonged to a type of satirical newspaper that was popular in Quebec at the time. Le Goglu was an eight-page-long broadsheet full of cartoons that mocked various prominent people, for instance, showing Mackenzie King as a clueless ape staring vacantly into space. The newspaper was based in a lower class part of Montreal, described by Arcand as an area "where are found Chinese gambling dens, Negro shacks, Greeks, cutthroat Slavs, Bulgarian ruffians, Oriental grocers, nauseating Palestinian restaurants, European ex-convict scum, diamond importers from Chicago, and dives of every kind, where officers of the Canadian militia will get it on for 50 cents". The major target of Le Goglu's humour was what Arcand termed "the clique that is stifling the province", by which he mainly meant his former employer, du Tremblay, whom he was relentless in attacking as an exploitative boss and a hypocrite who failed to practice the Catholic social teachings in which he professed to believe. Le Goglu was a successful newspaper, and by 1929 for the Christmas special edition, Arcand could afford to print his paper in colour for 12 pages. The cartoons that mocked the ministers of the cabinet of Premier Louis-Alexandre Taschereau as corrupt resulted in several libel suits, which increased the paper's circulation.

The major advertisers for Le Goglu were at first the famous Bronfman family of Montreal who published advertisements promoting their brands of alcohol, but ceased their advertising after Le Goglu began publishing anti-Semitic statements. In August 1929, Arcand started publishing in Le Goglu a serialization of a novel he was writing, Popeline, chronicling the story of the eponymous heroine, an 18-year-old beauty "who had drunk long and deep from the cup of woe which gave her a heady feminine aura". Popeline was notable as one of the first novels written in the joual (local vernacular French), instead of Parisian French which had been the standard in Quebec until then. During November 1929, Arcand initiated his own political philosophy, the Ordre Patriotique des Goglus for the "general purification, on preserving our Latin character, our customs and our habits, on protecting our rights and our privileges". In December 1929, Arcand began a companion newspaper for Le Goglu, the Sunday weekly Le Miroir, which was more serious. In March 1930, Arcand initiated a third newspaper Le Chameau that soon failed during 1931 as it was unprofitable. He published and edited several newspapers during this period, most notably Le Goglu, Le Miroir, Le Chameau, Le Patriote, Le Fasciste Canadien and Le Combat National.

== Political life ==
Until 1963, there was not any public school system in Quebec but rather two religious school systems, one operated by the Catholic Church and the other by the Protestant churches. Since the late 19th century, as an uncomfortable arrangement, Jewish children had been educated by the Protestant school system. During late 1929, the Taschereau government agreed to establish a separate Jewish school system in Montreal, an agreement that caused an intense reaction by the Catholic Church, which was stoutly opposed to Jewish schools, generating so much popular opposition that by 1931 Taschereau abandoned the plan. Arcand used the pages of Le Goglu to attack the plans for Jewish schools, and in May 1930 he published his antisemitic editorial, "Why Semitism Is a Danger". This was followed up by several antisemitic editorials during the spring and summer of 1930 such as "How Does Semitism Advance?", "The Word of God and the Jews", and "Semitism: Persecuted and Persecutor". By the summer of 1930, Le Goglu had been transformed from a populist, humorous newspaper into a largely antisemitic journal. Arcand credited much of his antisemitism to be a result of reading the pamphlet The Jewish World Problem by Lord Sydenham of Combe.

Arcand shared the idea widely accepted in French-Canada that the Confederation of 1867 was a "pact" between two "nations" that agreed to work together for their common betterment. Arcand argued that Canada existed only for the "two founding nations" and to accept the claim by any other group to "nationhood" would by necessity reduce the living standards of the "two founding nations". In this manner, Arcand argued that "to recognize the Jewish race as an official entity would violate the Confederation pact, eliminate our rights, and force us to officially recognize as national entities all the other groups, such as Polish, Greek, Syrian, Russian, Serbian, German who may request it later". Arcand's antisemitism was motivated at least partly by the fact that the majority of Ashkenazim (Yiddish-speaking Jews) immigrants from Eastern Europe usually arrived in Montreal, where a great many chose to settle. Arcand saw the Jews as economic competitors, contrasting his idealized, rural French-Canadian Catholic small grocer who was honest and hard-working with the stereotype of the greedy and unscrupulous big city Jewish immigrant capitalist who only succeeded because of "his dishonesty, not his skill or ability".

Like many other French-Canadian intellectuals at the time, Arcand had considerable hatred for "godless" France, considered as having abandoned Roman Catholicism, leaving Quebec as the last remnant of the "true" France that ended in 1789. Arcand also profoundly disliked the egalitarianism of French republicanism, writing with disgust how Josephine Baker, the "richest and most famous Negress" in France, became a millionaire "after showing her derrière at the Folies Bérgères". For Arcand, it was unacceptable for someone like Baker to become rich at a time when Caucasians were suffering from the Great Depression, which for him represented a distorted social order.

In May 1930, Arcand met with the millionaire Conservative leader R. B. Bennett to ask him for his financial assistance in exchange for which Arcand would campaign against the Liberals in the coming election. French-Canadians tended to vote as a bloc for the Liberals at the time, and the fact that the Liberals usually won the majority of the seats in Quebec gave them an advantage in elections. The perception that the Conservatives, identified as the party of "imperialism" (i.e. advocacy for the British empire), were anti-French and anti-Catholic made it difficult for the Conservatives to win seats in Quebec since the late 19th century. The fact that the Liberal politician William Lyon Mackenzie King was a protege of Sir Wilfrid Laurier and had campaigned as an anti-conscription Liberal in the 1917 election gave him the reputation as a friend of Quebec despite the fact that he did not speak French. In a letter to Bennett dated 22 May 1930, Arcand asked for some $15,000 in exchange for which he would manage what he called a "smear campaign" against Mackenzie King, a request that Bennett agreed to.

Arcand received covert funds from the Conservative Party to operate his newspapers and campaign for Bennett in the 1930 federal election. In an editorial in Le Goglu, Arcand referred to Mackenzie King and Premier Taschereau "two notorious stinkers". In another editorial, Arcand referred to Mackenzie King as "the enemy of the people". The main theme of Arcand's attacks was that Mackenzie King was a man who did not care about the suffering caused by the Great Depression, and criticizing King's well-known "continentalism" (i.e. establishing a better relationship with the United States), Arcand described him as a friend of American billionaires. In the election of 28 July 1930, the Conservatives won a majority of 134 seats, 24 of which were in Quebec. Given that the Conservatives had much difficulty winning seats in French-Canada, the 24 seats won in Quebec were an impressive achievement and Arcand was quick to take the credit in his letters to Bennett, arguing that the Conservatives would not have won any seats in Quebec as they usually did without him.

Relations became increasingly bad afterwards as Bennett had little use for Arcand after the election. Despite demands from Arcand and his followers to get more money to compensate for their expenses, the subsidy they received from the Tories was sporadic and insufficient. In October 1932, Arcand first made contact with the German Nazi Party when its representative, Kurt Lüdecke, visited Montreal, and told Arcand that the two philosophies had much in common and should cooperate. In his report to Adolf Hitler about his visit, Lüdecke described Arcand as a "man of lively intelligence" whose philosophy was becoming increasingly popular and who was very close to Prime Minister Bennett. Arcand promised to schedule a meeting between Lüdecke and Bennett, and though he did send a letter to Bennett requesting that he meet Lüdecke, the proposed meeting never occurred.

Arcand was always a staunch federalist and an anglophile. He received secret funds from Lord Sydenham of Combe, former governor of Bombay and a prominent fascist sympathizer in the British Conservative Party after he translated into French Sydenham's pamphlet "The Jewish World Problem". He also maintained correspondence with Arnold Spencer Leese, chief of the Imperial Fascist League. Arcand was influenced most strongly by British fascism as he maintained an active correspondence with various British fascists such as Lord Sydenham, Henry Hamilton Beamish and Admiral Sir Barry Domvile. With the idea of forming a fascist leadership for the British empire, Arcand started a correspondence that continued until his death with Sir Oswald Mosley, the leader of the British Union of Fascists (BUF). Many of the articles that appeared in Le Fasciste Canadien were translations of articles from Action and Blackshirt, the two journals of the BUF.

In 1934, Arcand established the Parti National Social Chrétien (Christian National Social Party), which advocated anti-communism and the banishment of Canadian Jews to the Hudson Bay area. The latter idea was inspired by his friend, noted British Rhodesian fascist Henry Hamilton Beamish, who suggested sending Jews to Madagascar. In 1935 the desperate Bennett ministry again turned to Arcand, who was appointed at the urging of Senator Rainville to the post of Tory publicity director in Quebec. However, many of Arcand's friends were more sympathetic to the Reconstruction Party, so Le Patriote supported H. H. Stevens while its editor was campaigning for Bennett. Bennett secretly hired Arcand as his chief electoral organizer in Quebec for the 1935 federal election.

In November 1936, Arcand was returning from a rally when he got into a car accident. Arcand survived without any serious injuries, but a fellow fascist accompanying him, 25-year-old Émile Vallée, was killed. Arcand had been serving as a mentor to Vallée. A group of Canadian fascists in their uniforms attended his funeral.

In 1938, Arcand was chosen as the director of the fascist National Unity Party of Canada, resulting from the fusion of his Parti National Social Chrétien with the Prairie provinces' Canadian Nationalist Party led by William Whittaker and the CNP's Ontario wing, led by Joseph Farr, which had grown out of the Toronto Swastika Clubs of the early 1930s.

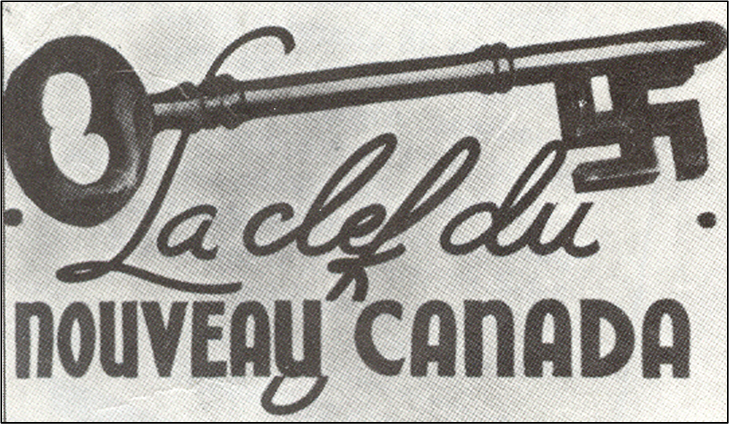
Postcard used by Arcand's devotees

Arcand's party statutes advocated the following oath to be taken at the beginning of every party meeting:

Moved by the unshakable faith in God, a profound love for Canada, ardent sentiments of patriotism and nationalism, a complete loyalty and devotion toward our Gracious Sovereign who forms the recognized principle of active authority, a complete respect for the British North America Act, for the maintenance of order, for national prosperity, for national unity, for national honour, for the progress and the happiness of a greater Canada, I pledge solemnly and explicitly to serve my party. I pledge myself to propagate the principles of its program. I pledge myself to follow its regulation. I pledge myself to obey my leaders. Hail the party! Hail our Leader!

Arcand was always opposed to Quebec nationalism. He wanted to build a powerful centralized Canadian Fascist state within the British Empire.

... Arcand insists that his organisation has no sympathy with the extreme French nationalist movement represented by the group which split from Premier Duplessis after he was returned to power because he would not go all the way they wished. "We were the first in Quebec to fight Separatism," Arcand declared, "and we are carrying on that fight very satisfactorily, swallowing many ex-members of that failing movement." Frankly, the National Social Christian Party was aiming for Dominion power, Arcand admitted, describing Dominion power as the real key to the vital problems of this country.

On May 30, 1940, he was arrested in Montreal for "plotting to overthrow the state" and interned for the duration of the war as a security threat. His party, then termed the National Unity Party, was banned. In the internment camp, he sat on a throne built by other prisoners and spoke of how he would rule Canada when Hitler conquered it. Arcand was released from custody on July 5, 1945.

Arcand would later argue that he was interned on the orders of the Canadian Jewish Congress.

== After the war ==
Arcand campaigned for the House of Commons of Canada on two occasions. Despite being shunned by mainstream Quebecers during the post-war years, he managed to come second with 29 percent of the vote when he campaigned as a National Unity candidate in the riding of Richelieu—Verchères in the 1949 federal election. He came second again with 39 percent of the vote when he campaigned as a "Nationalist" in Berthier—Maskinongé—Delanaudière in the 1953 election.

On 2 February 1952, the British fascist Peter Huxley-Blythe wrote to Arcand asking for permission to publish in German his anti-Semitic pamphlet "La Clé du mystère", writing: "I'm anxious to obtain two hundred (200) copies of your excellent work, The Key to the Mystery as soon as possible to fulfill an order I have received from Germany". Permission was granted, and on 27 February 1952 he wrote to Arcand for permission to print 300 more copies of La Clé du mystère for sale in Great Britain. In 1957, he campaigned for Progressive Conservative candidate and future Quebec cabinet minister Remi Paul.

Arcand never wavered in his endorsement of Adolf Hitler, and, during the 1960s, was a mentor to Ernst Zündel, who became a prominent Holocaust denier and neo-Nazi propagandist during the latter part of the 20th century. Arcand often corresponded with Issa Nakhleh, a Palestinian Christian who served as the chief of the Palestine Arab Delegation.

On November 14, 1965, he gave a speech before a crowd of 650 partisans from all over Canada at the Centre Paul-Sauvé in Montreal which was draped in the blue banners and insignia of the National Unity Party. As reported in La Presse and Le Devoir, he took the occasion to thank the newly elected Liberal Member of Parliament for Mount Royal, Pierre Trudeau, and former Conservative politician George Drew, for speaking in his defence when he was interned. However, Trudeau and Drew denied that they had ever defended Arcand or his opinions, and insisted that they had in fact been defending the principle of free speech even for fascists.

"Among the rare bits of support Arcand received was an astonishing one from a young law student in London. This young man was Pierre Elliott Trudeau. From the British capital on February 4, 1948, he wrote a rich and dense article of the type that would soon contribute to his renown in a new magazine called Cite Libre. In its issue of February 14, 1948, Notre Temps gave a prominent place to the item by this young contributor who protested against the use of the War Measures Act. Of course, he could not have been aware that he would apply this same law himself in October 1970."

Among those present at the rally were Jean Jodoin, a Progressive Conservative candidate in the 1965 federal election and Gilles Caouette, future Social Credit Party of Canada Member of Parliament.

== Views ==
In an interview with David Martin published in The Nation, Arcand said his party stood for "God, family, private property and personal initiative. ... We believe that the Jews are responsible for all the evils of the world today. Through the two Internationals that they control, the proletarian and the financial, they provoke economic crises and revolutions with a view to taking world power." He stated that once the National Unity Party won an election, it would ban all other political parties and claim liberalism was "an instrument of world Jewry". When asked whether he intended to kill the Jews off, he said he would "send them to Madagascar" and joked he was "The greatest Zionist in the world!"

== In popular culture ==
- Arcand is portrayed by Haley Joel Osment in Kevin Smith's 2016 comedy horror movie Yoga Hosers.

== Sources ==
- Betcherman, Lita-Rose (1975). The swastika and the maple leaf: Fascist movements in Canada in the thirties. Toronto: Fitzhenry & Whiteside. ISBN 9780889020221.
- Nadeau, Jean-Francois (2011). The Canadian Fuhrer: The Life of Adrien Arcand. James Lorimer & Company. ISBN 978-1-55277-904-0.
- Repka, William; Repka, Kathleen (1982). Dangerous Patriots: Canada's Unknown Prisoners of War. Vancouver: New Star Books. ISBN 0-919573-06-1.
- Robin, Martin (1992). Shades of Right: Nativist and Fascist Politics in Canada, 1920-1940. Toronto: University of Toronto Press. ISBN 0-8020-5962-7.
- Strömsdörfer, Hans (2009). "Arcand, Adrien". In Benz, Wolfgang (ed.). Handbuch des Antisemitismus: Judenfeindschaft in Geschichte und Gegenwart (in German). Vol. Band 2/1 Personen A-K). 1. Auflage. Berlin: De Gruyter. pp. 31–32. ISBN 978-3-598-24072-0.
- Théorêt, Hugues (January 2015). "Influence et rayonnement international d'Adrien Arcand". Globe Revue internationale d'études québécoises. 18 (1): 19–45. doi:10.7202/1037876ar.
- Rajotte, David (2018). "L'État canadien contre le Parti de l'unité nationale et Adrien Arcand". Bulletin d'histoire politique. 26 (3): 189–211. doi:10.7202/1046920ar.
- Delarosbil, Simon (2019). ""L'évolution des lexiques révisionniste et négationniste d'Adrien Arcand entre 1933 et 1966 : une analyse textométrique"". Laïus. La revue étudiante en lettres et en histoire de l'UQAR. 12: 65–83.
