= Law society =

Association of regulatory lawyers

A law society is an association of lawyers with a regulatory role that includes the right to supervise the training, qualifications, and conduct of lawyers. Where there is a distinction between barristers and solicitors, solicitors are regulated by the law societies and barristers by a separate bar council.

== History ==
Much has changed for law societies in recent years, with governments in Australia, New Zealand, England, Wales, and Scotland creating government sponsored regulators for lawyers (both barristers and solicitors), leaving to law societies the role of advocacy on behalf of their members.

=== Canada ===
In Canada, each province and territory has a law society (French: barreau) with statutory responsibility for regulation of the legal profession in the public interest. These law societies are members of the Federation of Law Societies of Canada, which seeks to increase coordination between its members and encourage the standardization of members' rules and procedures.

In Canada's common law jurisdictions, lawyers are both barristers and solicitors. Consequently, there is one law society per province or territory to regulate and represent the interests of legal professionals.

In Quebec, Canada's only civil law jurisdiction, the legal profession is split between legal advocates, governed by the Bar of Quebec, and civil law notaries, governed by the Chamber of Notaries of Quebec.

=== United Kingdom ===
The 1739/40 Society of Gentleman Practisers in the Courts of Law and Equity has been described as the first law society in the United Kingdom. However its relationship to the modern Law Society of England and Wales (founded 1825) is unclear.

=== United States ===
In the United States, unified bar associations are somewhat similar to law societies; however, there are differences between law societies and the general American phenomenon of bar associations. Usually a bar association is an association of lawyers; lawyers may or may not join as they wish. Regulation of American lawyers usually takes places through the courts, which decide who gets admitted as a lawyer, and also decide discipline cases. Law societies are often created by legislation and play (or played) significant direct roles in the training, licensing and disciplining of lawyers. The conflict or roles between being a regulator and a trade association is seen by many as giving rise to the recent move to government sponsored regulators.

Law societies also play a role as part of the justice system, and concern themselves with access to justice. As a result, they may offer paid and unpaid legal assistance to the public or specific target audiences, and have historically been involved in the development of legal aid plans.

== List of law societies ==
=== Britain and Ireland ===
- Law Society of England and Wales (c. 1825)
- Law Society of Scotland (c. 1949)
- Law Society of Ireland (c. 1852)
- Law Society of Northern Ireland (c. 1922)
- Isle of Man Law Society (c. 1859)
- Ecclesiastical Law Society, Church of England (1987)
- Society of Solicitor Advocates, Scotland (1994)
- Cambridge University Law Society (c. 1901)

=== Australia ===
Law Societies in Australia represent the interests of solicitors and are organised in each State and mainland territory. Australia has a split profession, and barristers' interests are represented by separately-organised Bar Councils in each State and territory. The Law Council of Australia is a peak body representing the interests of all legal practitioners at federal level.

- Law Society of New South Wales (informally 1842; formally 1884)
- Law Society of Tasmania (informally 1845; formally 1888)
- Law Institute of Victoria (1859)
- Queensland Law Society (informally 1873; formally 1883)
- Law Society of South Australia (1879)
- Law Society of Western Australia (1927)
- ACT Law Society (1933)
- Law Council of Australia (1933)
- Law Society of the Northern Territory (1968)

=== Canada ===
Each province and territory in Canada has a law society which governs the legal profession, with the exception of Quebec, which has two.

- Law Society of Alberta (1907)
- Law Society of British Columbia (1869)
- Law Society of Manitoba (1907)
- Law Society of New Brunswick (1846)
- Law Society of Newfoundland and Labrador (1834)
- Law Society of the Northwest Territories (1978)
- Nova Scotia Barristers' Society (1825) - succeeded Nova Scotia Bar c. 1749
- Law Society of Nunavut (1999)
- Law Society of Ontario (1797)
- Law Society of Prince Edward Island (1876)
- Bar of Quebec (1849) - succeeding the non-statutory body Community of Lawyers (Communauté des avocats) c. 1765
- Chamber of Notaries of Quebec (1870)
- Law Society of Saskatchewan (1907)
- Law Society of Yukon (1971)

=== India ===
- The Law Society (Aligarh Muslim University) (1894)

=== Other countries ===
- Fiji Law Society
- Law Society of Hong Kong (c. 1907)
- New Zealand Law Society (c. 1869)
- Law Society of Singapore (c. 1967)
- Law Society of Zimbabwe (c. 1981)

== See also ==
- Bar association
- Bar council
