= William Cox (Nova Scotia lawyer) =

Canadian lawyer (1921–2008)

A. William Cox QC

52nd President of the Canadian Bar Association
- In office 1980–1981
- Preceded by: Gordon Fripp Henderson
- Succeeded by: Paul D.K. Fraser

President, Federation of Law Societies of Canada
- In office 1975–1976

President, Nova Scotia Barristers' Society
- In office 1971–1972
- Preceded by: R. Roland McIntyre
- Succeeded by: A. Lloyd Caldwell

Personal details
- Born: May 13, 1921 Saint John, New Brunswick, Canada
- Died: October 8, 2008 (aged 87) Halifax, Nova Scotia, Canada
- Party: Progressive Conservative Party of Canada; Progressive Conservative Association of Nova Scotia
- Spouse: Margaret Macpherson
- Education: Acadia University (BA); New College, Oxford; Dalhousie University (LL.B)
- Profession: Lawyer

Military service
- Allegiance: Canadian Army; Canadian Militia
- Rank: Lieutenant Colonel
- Unit: Princess Louise Fusiliers
- Battles/wars: World War II: Holland

Arthur William (Bill) Cox, QC (May 13, 1921 – October 8, 2008) was a Canadian lawyer, practising in Halifax, Nova Scotia. He served overseas during World War II. On his return to Canada, he became an active member of the legal profession, serving as president of the Nova Scotia Barristers' Society (1971–1972), the Federation of Law Societies of Canada (1975–1976) and the Canadian Bar Association. He was also active politically, with both the Progressive Conservative Party of Canada and the Progressive Conservative Party of Nova Scotia.

== Early life and family ==
Cox was born in Saint John, New Brunswick. His parents were Arthur Earle and Anna Beatrice (McGinley) Cox. He was educated in public schools and went on to Acadia University in Wolfville, Nova Scotia, where he was active in the university community. He graduated with a Bachelor of Arts degree in 1942.

He married Margaret Macpherson, with whom he had four daughters.

== Military career ==
Cox participated in the Canadian Officer Training Corps while attending university. Upon graduation in 1942, he was commissioned into the Canadian Army and was posted to Britain. He was wounded in combat in Holland and transferred to a London hospital. Upon recovery, Cox became a battlefield instructor until the end of the war.

After World War II, Cox remained active with the Canadian Militia, serving with the Princess Louise Fusiliers. He was promoted to Lieutenant Colonel by age 34, and was appointed General Staff Officer (Training) at 4th Militia Group Headquarters, Halifax. He was one of the youngest senior officers in the Militia at that time.

== Legal career ==
After the war, Cox studied law at New College, Oxford. Upon his return to Canada, he enrolled in the Dalhousie Law School in Halifax, Nova Scotia, and graduated with a Bachelor of Laws degree in 1949.

Cox established his legal practice in Halifax after graduation, acquiring a reputation as a well-known trial lawyer. He was a partner with the firm of Cox Downie, where he practised from 1963 to 1991. As part of his practice, he served as the solicitor for the Union of Nova Scotia Municipalities for thirty-eight years.

The Government of Nova Scotia appointed him Queen's Counsel in 1965.

== Leadership in the legal profession ==
Cox played a leadership role in the legal profession, both in Nova Scotia and nationally. He was a bencher with the Nova Scotia Barristers' Society, the provincial body which regulates the legal profession and lawyers. He was president of the Society in 1971-1972. During his term as president, he chaired the Nova Scotia Committee on Implementation of Legal Aid. The Committee's work led to the introduction of the provincial system of Legal Aid in Nova Scotia, for individuals charged with criminal offences who cannot afford a lawyer.

Following his term as president of the Nova Scotia Barristers' Society, he became the Society's representative on the Federation of Law Societies of Canada, an umbrella body for all Canadian law societies. He eventually served as president of the Federation, in 1975-1976.

Cox was an active member of the Canadian Bar Association, serving as president of the Nova Scotia branch in 1972-1973, and then as national president in 1980-1981.

Cox was chair of the Law Foundation of Nova Scotia for ten years.

== Community Activities ==
Cox was on the executive committee of the board of governors of Acadia University, his alma mater. He also was a volunteer with the Red Cross, including a term as chairman of the combined Red Cross - Community Chest Appeal. He was a member of the Saraguay Club, the Royal United Services Institute in Halifax, as well as the North British Society. He was also active with the Nova Scotia Assessors School.

He belonged to St Matthew's United Church, and eventually served as an elder and chairman of stewards. Cox later transferred to St David's Presbyterian church.

== Political activities ==
Cox was a supporter of the Progressive Conservative Party, both federally and provincially. He was a past president of the Halifax City and County Progressive Conservative Association. For ten years, he was the Treasurer of the Progressive Conservative Association of Nova Scotia, coinciding with Robert Stanfield's term as premier of Nova Scotia. Later, he was the Vice-President of the Progressive Conservative Party of Canada.

== Later life ==
Cox retired from the practice of law in 1991. In his retirement, he became a columnist for the Halifax Chronicle-Herald, starting in 1997.

Cox died in Halifax in 2008, at the Camp Hill Veterans' Memorial Building, Queen Elizabeth II Health Sciences Centre.

== Honours and distinctions ==
- 1965: Queen's Counsel
- 1977: Fellow of the American College of Trial Lawyers
- 1981: Honorary Member of the American Bar Association
- 1982: Doctor of Laws, honoris causa, Dalhousie University
- 1996: First recipient of the Distinguished Service Award presented by the Nova Scotia Branch of the CBA
- 1997: Honorary Fellow in the Law for the Future Fund of the CBA
- 2002: Received the Queen Elizabeth II Golden Jubilee Medal
- Life Fellow of the Foundation for Legal Research and the CBA
