= LSNB =

LSNB may refer to:

- Law Society of New Brunswick
- Lone Star National Bank
