= Trinity Western University =

Private Christian university in British Columbia, Canada

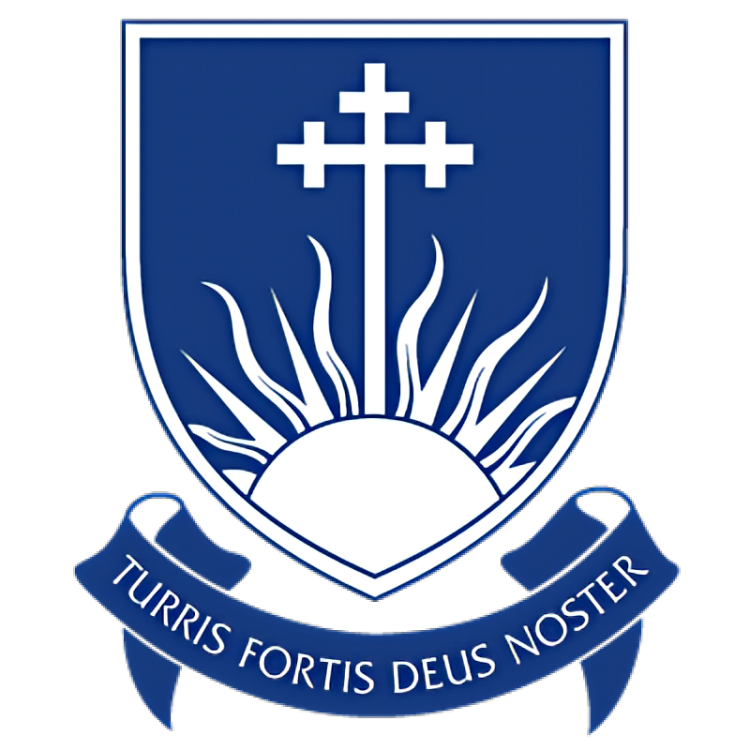
- Motto: Latin: Turris Fortis Deus Noster
- Motto in English: A Mighty Fortress Is Our God
- Type: Private
- Established: 1962; 64 years ago Trinity Junior College (1962–1972), Trinity Western College (1972–1985), Trinity Western University (1986–present)
- Religious affiliation: Evangelical Christian: Evangelical Free Church of Canada; Evangelical Free Church of America; Wesleyan Holiness Connection
- Academic affiliations: AUCC, ATS, CUP, CHEC, CCCU, RSC, BCEQA.
- Endowment: CAD $22.4 million (2019)
- President: Todd F. Martin
- Provost: Susan Wendel (interim)
- Students: 6,000
- Location: 3 campuses (Langley and Richmond, British Columbia, and Ottawa, Ontario)
- Campus: Suburban/Rural 157 acres (64 ha)
- Colours: Gold & blue
- Nickname: Spartans
- Sporting affiliations: U Sports, CWUAA
- Website: twu.ca
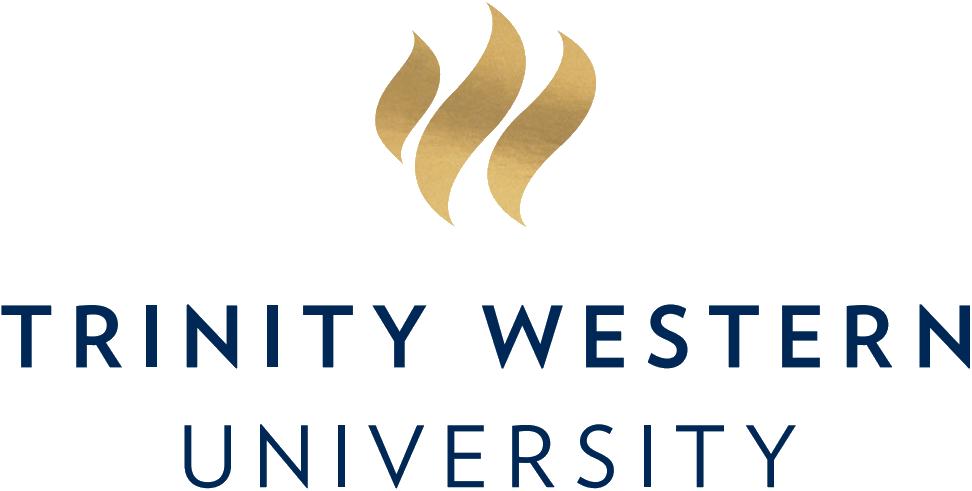

Trinity Western University (TWU) is a private Christian liberal arts college and research university with campuses in Langley and Richmond, British Columbia, Canada. TWU is a research institution offering undergraduate and graduate degrees in the humanities and sciences as well as in several professional schools. The school is a member of Universities Canada and the Council for Christian Colleges and Universities.

Founded in 1962, Trinity Western enrols over 6,000 students annually. As Canada's largest Christian university, TWU offers 48 undergraduate degree programs and 20 graduate degree programs. TWU has an average first-year class size of 25 students. There are over 30,000 TWU alumni around the world.

Trinity Western is a member of the Royal Society of Canada. Its varsity teams, known as the Trinity Western Spartans, are members of U Sports. The Spartans have won 14 U SPORTS National Championships and 34 Canada West Championships.

Dr. Todd F. Martin is TWU’s sixth president, inaugurated on April 24, 2025.

In April 2025, it was announced that Trinity Evangelical Divinity School, in Deerfield, Illinois, would join with Trinity Western University and cease operations at its Chicago-area campus.

== History ==
Trinity Western University traces its history back to 1957, when a committee was established by the Evangelical Free Church of America to study and consider the feasibility of a liberal arts college on North America's Pacific Coast. The committee decided on a location between Vancouver and Seattle, in rural British Columbia, in what is now the Township of Langley. Trinity Junior College began as a two-year college in 1962, and its name was changed to Trinity Western College 10 years later, following a significant period of growth in enrolment and program options. After 20 years as a transfer college, Trinity Western began awarding baccalaureate degrees in 1980. In 1985 the British Columbia provincial government, through the Trinity Western University Act, legislated the institution to its current position as a privately-funded Christian university and it became known as Trinity Western University. It is the fourth-oldest university in the province of British Columbia after the University of British Columbia, the University of Victoria, and Emily Carr University of Art and Design.

=== Insignia and symbols ===
Trinity Western's motto is Turris Fortis Deus Noster. The Latin motto is translated as "A Mighty Fortress is Our God". The inspiration for the motto came from a famous hymn of the same name written by Martin Luther.

The university's coat of arms was granted by the Royal College of Arms, and was presented to University pPresident R. Neil Snider in 1986 by the Lieutenant Governor of B.C. on behalf of Her Majesty Queen Elizabeth II. A torch symbol is also used prevalently at the university, as the coat of arms is reserved to authenticate the highest official University academic and legal documents.

Spartans is the nickname of the varsity teams that compete for Trinity Western University. The name, which comes from the Ancient Greek civilization of Sparta, originated when the university's first intercollegiate team the men's basketball team, began competing in 1964.

== Academic programs ==
Trinity Western University is an independent privately-supported institution and offers a liberal arts education. Since its founding in 1962, it has identified as a Christian institution although it has always been governed independently from any church or religious organization. It is currently administered by a 17-member Board of Governors to which the President reports.

Undergraduates fulfill general education requirements, choose among a wide variety of elective courses, and pursue departmental concentrations and interdisciplinary certificate programs. Students usually take classes through the university's semester system, with three semesters taking place each year. The fall semester lasts from September to December, and the spring semester from January to April. For students wishing to take classes over summer, the university offers several courses on campus as well as travel studies through its summer semester programming, which runs from May to August.

Graduate students take courses through the School of Graduate Studies. Master's degree programs are available in the humanities, education, linguistics, psychology, business, nursing, and theology.

Undergraduate tuition for the 2025–26 academic year is $779 CDN per credit hour.^{[14]} International students pay roughly the same fees as Canadian domestic students. 97% of students received scholarships and financial aid from TWU in 2019.

In 2021, TWU launched a new Executive MBA (EMBA) program with students from diverse industries and professions, and in 2022, TWU welcomed the first cohort into its first-ever PhD program, a Doctorate in Philosophy of Nursing.^{[}

=== Undergraduate ===
Undergraduate degrees awarded by Trinity Western University include the Bachelor of Arts, Bachelor of Fine Arts, Bachelor of Science, Bachelor of Science in Nursing, Bachelor of Business Administration, Bachelor of Education, and Bachelor of Human Kinetics. There is also a Bachelor of Applied Science in Engineering transfer program in collaboration with the University of British Columbia's engineering department. Honours programs are available in a number of majors.

Undergraduate courses in the humanities are traditionally either seminars or lectures held one- or two-times a week with an additional conversation-based seminar called a "discussion group". To graduate, all students must complete a liberal arts core curriculum known as the "University Core", comprising 18 classes of various subjects. Students have a high degree of latitude in creating a self-structured Core, which allows students to study subjects of interest outside their chosen major. Most of the Core classes at Trinity Western are led by a full-time professor (as opposed to a teaching assistant).

Within the 18 classes, students complete a two-semester English language requirement, along with courses from the fine arts, natural sciences, philosophy, history, sociology, and religious studies departments, two courses of interdisciplinary studies, and up to three physical education courses.

In addition to the Core, students are required to complete an academic major. Trinity Western University grants bachelor's degrees in 45 academic majors, and 56 minors, concentrations, or certificates, with over 1,200 courses from which to choose. Students may choose courses from any of the university's faculties or schools:

- Faculty of Humanities and Social Sciences
- Faculty of Natural and Applied Sciences
- School of the Arts, Media + Culture
- School of Business
- School of Human Kinetics
- School of Education
- School of Nursing
- Catholic Pacific College, Trinity Western's constituent Catholic college

Whereas most courses are offered on Trinity Western's main campus in Langley, students may study in Richmond, British Columbia; or online. Furthermore, many take part in travel studies and exchange programs at partner institutions or universities across the globe. Students are also free to design their own courses with the support of a faculty member or member of the administration.

=== Graduate ===
Trinity Western offers graduate programs through its School of Graduate Studies, either at the Langley or Richmond campus, including:

- Master of Arts in Biblical Studies
- Master of Business Administration
- Master of Science in Nursing
- Doctor of Philosophy in Nursing
- Master of Arts in Counselling Psychology
- Master of Arts in Educational Leadership
- Master of Arts Linguistics
- Master of Arts Educational Studies - Special Education
- Master of Arts Interdisciplinary Humanities
- Master of Arts in Leadership
- Master of Arts in Leadership - Business Stream in Mandarin

While the MBA program offers specializations in International Business and Managing a Growing Enterprises, it is also one of only two MBA programs in Canada to offer a non-profit specialization.

The MA Counselling Psychology Program is currently one of only six programs in Canada that is fully accredited by CACEP, a division of the CCPA.

Trinity Western also hosts ACTS Seminaries, a group of seminaries founded when several Christian denominations partnered to establish an institution that would train men and women in the study of theology and for positions as ministers. The following Masters programs are offered through ACTS Seminaries:

- Master of Theological Studies
- Master of Divinity
- Master of Theology
- Master of Arts in Marriage and Family Therapy
- Master of Arts in Christian Studies
- Master of Arts in Linguistics and Translation
- Doctor of Ministry

=== Cancelled Faculty of Law ===
In July 2012, the university submitted a proposal to offer a Juris Doctor program. The proposal was put forth to the provincial Ministry of Advanced Education and the Federation of Law Societies of Canada, and was approved in December 2013.

On December 12, 2014, due to the ongoing lawsuits surrounding law societies voting to not automatically accredit TWU law students upon graduation, B.C. Advanced Education Minister Amrik Virk revoked the province's approval of the proposed law school at Trinity Western University. In his letter to the school's administration, he expressed the importance of the legal process and encouraged TWU to re-apply once the court cases have been settled.

== Student life ==
In 2011, Trinity Western received an A level rating in The Globe and Mail's "Overall Student Satisfaction" category and an A+ rating for its "Sense of Community on Campus". Campus housing is provided to students in all years of study, and all students in their first and second year are required to live on campus in residential halls unless living with family. Third and fourth year students have the option of living off-campus. Trinity Western offers its students nearly 100 organizations, teams, and sports.

The university was founded by a committee commissioned by the Evangelical Free Church of America, a denomination in the Radical Pietistic tradition, to establish a Christian liberal arts college. Accordingly, the committee's mission has shaped the campus and the university. Trinity Western University has maintained extremely close ties with the broader Christian church, and historically has had close relationships with the Evangelical and Mainline Protestant denominations, as well as with the Mennonite tradition recently. This has also resulted in the university having a significant American influence when compared with other Canadian universities. More than one out of every six students is American.

The university previously mandated that all students abide by a code of conduct called the Community Covenant, which was described as "a solemn pledge in which members place themselves under obligations on the part of the institution to its members, the members to the institution, and the members to one another." As of August 2018, students are no longer required to sign the covenant.

The covenant bans sexual relationships outside of a marriage between a woman and a man, as well as behaviour such as hazing, verbal and physical harassment, dishonesty including plagiarism, theft or destruction of another's property, the use of illegal drugs, consuming alcohol on campus, or consuming pornography.

A 2015 ruling in the Ontario Superior Court of Justice held that "discrimination inherent in the Community Covenant extends not only to [LGBTQ] persons, but also to women generally; to those persons of any gender who might prefer, for their own purposes, to live in a common law relationship rather than engage in the institution of marriage; and to those persons who have other religious beliefs... Despite some efforts by TWU to contend that the Community Covenant does not operate in a discriminatory fashion, it is self-evident that it does." The court ruling noted that "failure to adhere to the conduct imposed by the Community Covenant, carries with it serious consequences." The covenant mandated "at a minimum, suspension" for "sexual intimacy involving persons of the same sex." The school's board of governors voted on August 9, 2018, to make the Community Covenant optional for current and incoming students, effective at the beginning of the 2018–19 school year. TWU's president at the time, Robert Kuhn (2014–19), said in a statement that the change was so that the university could be "inclusive of all students wishing to learn from a Christian viewpoint and underlying philosophy."

Professors of the university sign a statement of faith annually. This policy has caused some controversy within academic circles, and was most recently covered in Maclean's. As in line with the students, a mixture of Christian traditions are represented. Orthodox and Hebrew professors are also on staff.

Approximately 80% of undergraduates enrolled self-identify as Christian. There are many Christian clubs, organizations, and ministries on campus. There is no compulsory participation in any religious liturgies. Students and clubs of other religious denominations are welcomed and supported. Nearly every resident hall has a Chaplain in residence. In the morning on every weekday there is Chapel, at which attendance is voluntary, and communion is offered on one Friday each month. Within the university Core, students are required four terms of Religious Studies. One term is allotted to a Survey of the Old Testament, and one to a Survey of the New Testament. Another term must be a class in Religious and Cultural studies.

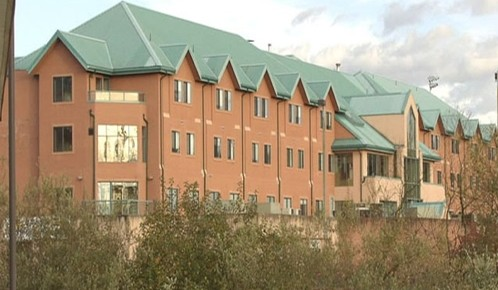
DeVries Centre

Catholic Pacific College, formerly Redeemer Pacific College, is the university's constituent Catholic college. CPC's Glover Road Campus is adjacent to TWU. CPC is administered separately of the university, offers classes in Catholic studies and a liberal arts curriculum is taught by a Catholic faculty. Mass is also offered four times weekly.

=== Student groups ===
Trinity Western's nearly 100 student organizations and clubs cover a wide range of interests. In 2011, the university hosted 11 academic groups, four cultural groups, five "issue-oriented" groups, eight performing groups, six pre-professional groups, three publications, and 13 recreational groups. Greek life is not sponsored by the university.

Each year, the Foreign Affairs Society hosts a Model United Nations conference for high school students. The Trinity Western University Students Association is the elected government of the student body, and works as an aid and mediator between individual students and university administration, in addition to sponsoring several events throughout the academic year.

Members of the university's chamber choirs are often invited to guest perform with the Vancouver Symphony Orchestra, performances which have been broadcast on a number of occasions on CBC Radio; as well, Trinity Western's choirs have performed frequently with the CBC Radio Orchestra, the Vancouver Chamber Choir, and at venues including Carnegie Hall in New York and frequent performances at the Orpheum, Vancouver, and the Chan Shun Concert Hall.

=== Student media ===
The university hosts three student publications. Mars' Hill is the official student newspaper of Trinity Western University. It is funded by the TWU Student Association. The paper started as an underground newspaper in 1988, led by Bruce Beck, but was shut down by administration after only two issues. In 1995, it replaced the previous official student newspaper, The Today. Mars' Hill is published twelve times during the academic school year (September to May), coming out approximately every two weeks. About 2,000 copies are printed for each edition. Mars' Hill has won the Associated Collegiate Press National Pacemaker Award, considered the Pulitzer Prize of student journalism, for best non-daily newspaper in 2008 and 2010. It is a member of the Associated Collegiate Press and Canadian University Press.

Other student media on campus include [ s p a c e s ], an annual literary journal, is edited and published by students each year, as well as Pillar, the university's yearbook.

=== Athletics ===
Since its founding in 1962 Trinity Western has provided athletics for both women and men. Today, the university supports athletics at the varsity, club, and intramural levels. Its colours are gold and blue.

The university sponsors 11 men's and women's varsity sports. Teams compete in Canadian Interuniversity Sport, the top university athletics league in Canada, with teams competing in the Canada West Universities Athletic Association at the regional level. Varsity teams competing in U Sports include men's and women's basketball, soccer, volleyball, track and field, cross country, hockey, and rugby. The basketball, volleyball, and hockey teams play their home games and matches at the Langley Events Centre. Trinity Western teams have won nine U Sports national championships.

=== International Programs ===
Trinity Western's international programs offer students the ability to study all over the world for part of the summer, a semester, or a full year.

The School of Kinesiology has sponsored summer travel studies programs at the 2008 and 2012 Olympic Games in Beijing and in London, respectively. The School of Art, Media + Culture sponsors a summer program in Paris and London, and the School of Business sponsors a summer program in Ottawa and Quebec City. Various other summer programs are offered, such as coral reef biology in Hawaii, Biblical studies in Israel and the West Bank and Johannine literature in Turkey.

Additionally, in conjunction with the CCCU, the university offers 12 semester-long programs through the CCCU's BestSemester initiative. Sponsored programs include African studies in Uganda, filmmaking and film studies in Los Angeles, India studies in Tamil Nadu, Latin American studies in San Jose, Costa Rica, and American studies in Washington, D.C.

Trinity Western's research and exchange partnership with the University of Oxford enables qualifying students to study as a visiting student at Oxford for either a semester or a year. Exchange programs at Spain's University of Salamanca and China's Xiamen University are also available to students. Students may also make their own arrangements with the help of a faculty member to study at other universities in Canada or abroad as visiting students.

=== Laurentian Leadership Centre ===
The Laurentian Leadership Centre certificate program housed in Ottawa's Booth House, a National Historic Site of Canada, offers the opportunity for third- and fourth-year students to complete a fully credited semester of study while interning at Parliament, or a political group, business, media firm, or NGO in the national capital. Internship placements regularly include the Prime Minister's Office; the Ministry of Foreign Affairs; the Ministry of Finance; and the Conservative, Liberal, and New Democratic parties; as well as, the Canadian Council of Chief Executives; Royal Bank's Capital Markets division; CIDA; World Vision; and CPAC. The program is also available to visiting students of other universities.

=== OMADA Teambuilding ===
OMADA Teambuilding is a leadership and team building program housed in the School of Human Kinetics. The program uses experiential education and hands on learning for both TWU students and outside organizations. Started at the university in 1998, the Challenge Course was renamed OMADA Teambuilding in 2009 to better represent the diversity of the programs that were being offered.

== Campus ==
The main campus is located in the rural Township of Langley, British Columbia, occupying 157 acres (0.64 km^{2}) on the edge of historic Fort Langley. Fort Langley, a former fur-trade post of the Hudson's Bay Company, was selected by Governor Sir James Douglas as the provisional capital of the newly established Colony of British Columbia in 1858. There is a residence hall on campus named in honour of Douglas. The campus is situated about 45 minutes southeast from Vancouver and about 2 hours north from Seattle.

Campus buildings vary in age and style from Hanson Chapel, completed in 1962 (the first building completed on campus), to the Robert G. Kuhn Centre, completed in 2022. Today the campus consists of 36 buildings and residence halls that house the university's various departments and students.

McMillan Lake

The architecture on campus is inspired by British Columbia, Rural B.C., and the Pacific Northwest. Modern red brick covers Alloway Library, Larsen Atrium, and Stanley Nelson Student Centre at the main part of campus. Other significant buildings on campus include Robert N. Thompson Building which houses the Political Science, History, English, and Geography departments. The newly built and yet to be named Music Building is home to the School of Art, Media + Culture. The Faculty of Natural and Applied Sciences are housed in the Neufeld Science Centre, which experienced a major renovation in 2011, and the Vernon Stromback Centre at the east end of campus. In total there are 33 buildings on the university campus.

During President Raymond's tenure, the university built the Music Building in 2010, and in 2011 Fraser Hall and the Neufeld Science Centre received major renovations in 2011. In 2012 the Vernon Strombeck Centre received a significant interior and exterior renovation, and in 2013 the prominent Robert N. Thompson building was re-modeled... In September 2017, Trinity Western opened the first new dormitory in twenty-five years, as a result of rising enrolment.

Cafeteria meals are now served in an all-you-care-to-eat style, and three smaller venues around campus offer additional food services.

=== Academic facilities ===
The Norma Marion Alloway Library is the main library for undergraduate students, holding a circulation of over 300,000 books, 12,000 periodical subscriptions, and computer access to thousands more titles. The university archives house several special collections: the Mel Smith Archives, the Robert N. Thompson Archives, and the Lyle Wicks Papers, which chronicle Canada's political history through the works and personal documents of these three political figures. The library also has a Korean collection.

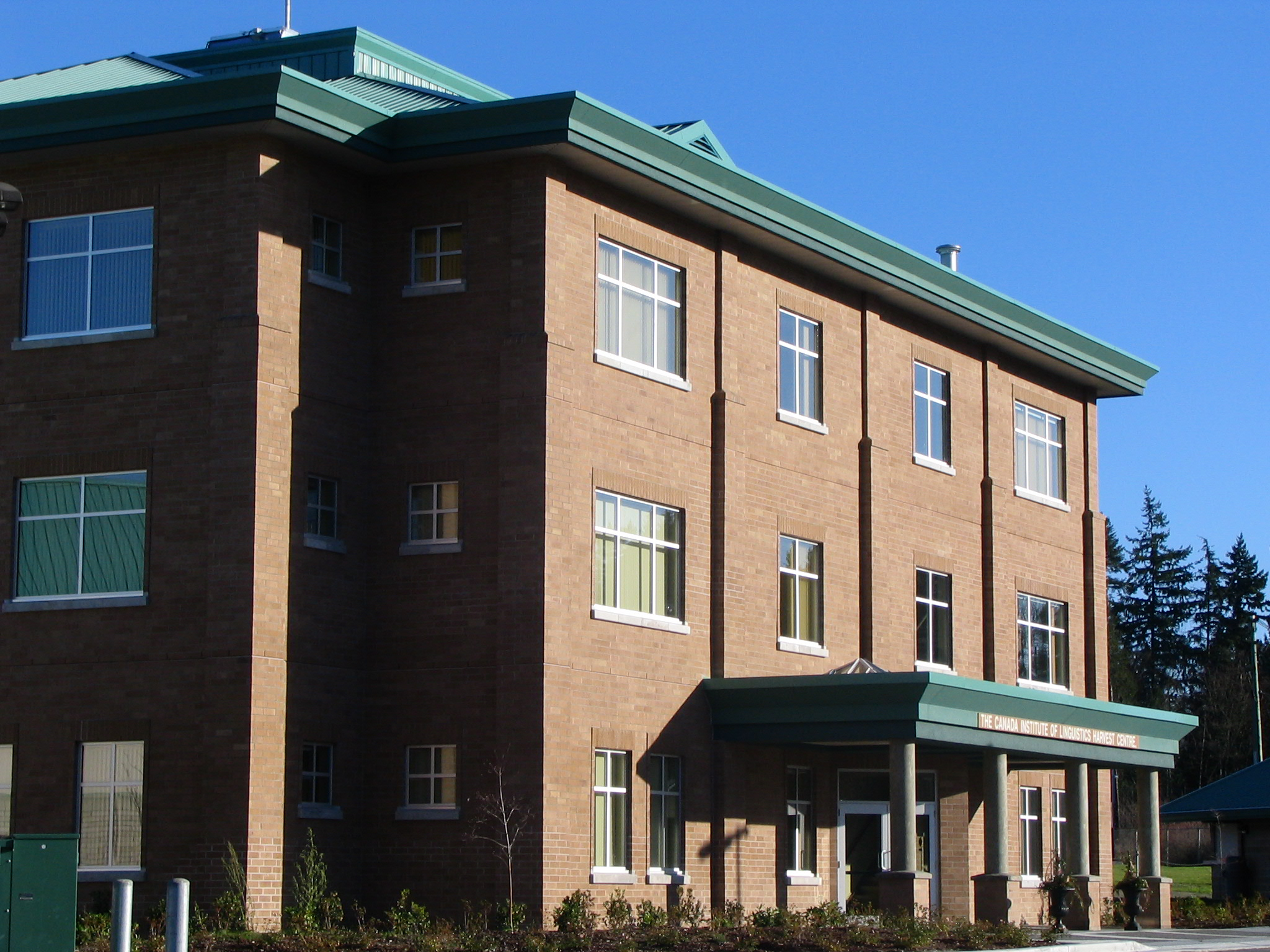
The Canada Institute of Linguistics

=== Athletic facilities ===
Rogers Field is located on the northeast edge of campus, and is the home pitch to the women's and men's varsity soccer teams. In 2008 Rogers Field was the host venue as the Spartans women's soccer team won the CIS Championship. It also hosted the men's CIS Championship in 2009.

David E. Enarson Gymnasium has been the university's indoor sports venue since it was built in 1969. In 2009, the newly built Langley Events Centre replaced Enarson as the home of Spartans basketball and volleyball, and replaced George Preston Arena as the home of Spartans hockey. The LEC was the host venue when the Spartans' men's volleyball team won the CIS Championship in 2011. Today, Enarson Gymnasium houses the university's athletic offices and strength and conditioning room, hosts physical education classes and intramurals, and occasionally varsity sports events. It is also the new home court for the Vancouver Dragons of the Minor League Basketball Association.

Tennis courts, an indoor rock wall, and practice fields are also located on campus. Though the university does not sponsor rowing teams, there are rowing facilities on the Fraser River. The cross country and track and field teams train at the Township of Langley's McLeod Athletic Park, the host park of the B.C. high school championships and the 2010 British Columbia Games. The Redwoods and Belmont golf courses are both located minutes from campus.

=== Satellite campuses ===
Ottawa - Booth House

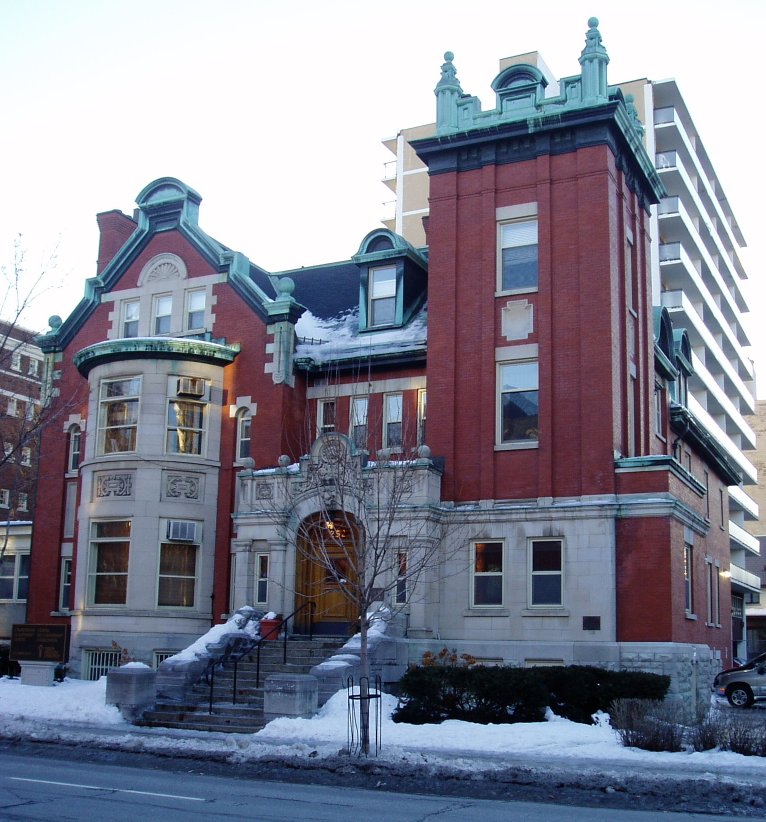
The Laurentian Leadership Centre, in Ottawa

The home of the Laurentian Leadership Centre in Ottawa is the Booth House, an historic mansion in Downtown Ottawa and a National Historic Site of Canada. Built in 1901 as the home of lumber and railway baron John R. Booth, Trinity Western purchased the building in 2000. Located on Metcalfe Street near Somerset, the campus is within minutes of the Parliament of Canada and many important governmental departments and embassies.

The Laurentian Leadership Centre program, an extension of Trinity Western University, offers third and fourth year students, and recent graduates, an opportunity to experience a fully credited semester of study as well as a Parliamentary, communications, business or NGO internship in Canada's national capital, Ottawa, Ontario. Although the program is open to students of any major, it is primarily designed for those who plan a career in political science, business, communications, history or international studies. The program is also open to visiting students from other universities.

The LLC is located a few blocks away from Parliament Hill, Ottawa. The 20 students accepted to the program each semester take three academic courses in: Canadian Governmental Leadership, Ethics & Public Affairs, and Law & Public Policy. Courses are taught both by TWU professors as well as national and international leaders and guest speakers.

The internship program is the distinguishing feature of the Laurentian Leadership Centre. The LLC director places each student in an internship relevant to his or her academic or career interest. Internships fall into a number of categories: government, corporate, media, communications, and non-governmental. Previous internships have included: the Prime Minister's Office (which hosts one intern each semester), foreign embassies, offices of Members of Parliament and Senators, the Ministry of Foreign Affairs, Mitel, World Vision, Make Poverty History, the National Arts Centre, RBC Capital Markets, the Ottawa Citizen newspaper, and a variety of others. Often these internships lead to full-time employment. Currently, there are several LLC graduates with positions in the PMO as well as in multiple ministries, political parties across Canada, and businesses from finance to high tech.

While participating in the program, students reside in an historic mansion on Metcalfe Street, the famous Booth House, which is designated as a National Historic Site of Canada.

Richmond

In addition to its main campus in Langley, BC, and branch campus in Ottawa, ON, Trinity Western University operates two in locations in Richmond, BC: Minoru (305-5900 Minoru Blvd) and Lansdowne (102-5300 Number 3 Road).

In his 2008 state of the university address, President Jonathan Raymond announced the grant of a rent-free 40,000-square-foot (3,700 m^{2}) space to be used toward university education in Richmond, British Columbia. Opened in 2012, the university's Richmond campus Minoru location extended educational opportunities to students in the city.

Lansdowne in Richmond is Trinity Western University’s newest location. Since opening in the spring of 2020, the Lansdowne location has served a global student body through a mix of online and in-person classes, specializing in the areas of leadership and business.

Every year, roughly 1,000 students choose to pursue their studies at one or both TWU Richmond sites.

== Controversies and court cases ==
In November 2016 The Province reported on the school's acceptance or lack thereof of LGBTQ students. According to the story, gay students were subjected to a culture of shame.

=== Teaching certification program accreditation lawsuit ===
In 1995, Trinity Western launched a teaching certification program, but the British Columbia College of Teachers denied accreditation of the university's program, arguing that the "Responsibilities of Membership" agreement students must sign (replaced in 2009 with the Community Covenant) is discriminatory and that those graduating from Trinity Western's program will discriminate against gay students. The lower courts in British Columbia and, later, the Supreme Court of Canada, ruled in favour of Trinity Western University, stating that there was no basis for the BCCT's decision, and, moreover, that "the concern that graduates of TWU will act in a detrimental fashion in the classroom is not supported by any evidence".

The final analysis of the case, as reported by the Factum of the Intervener, the B.C. Civil Liberties Association, was that "In the circumstances of this case the Council of the B.C. College of Teachers failed to conduct such an enquiry and erroneously concluded that equality of rights on the basis of sexual orientation trump freedom of religion and association. They do not."

=== Faculty of Law accreditation lawsuits ===
Automatic accreditation of graduates from TWU's proposed faculty of law were approved by most of the provincial law societies across Canada in 2014, except the Law Society of Upper Canada (now the Law Society of Ontario) and the Nova Scotia Barristers' Society.

==== Law Society of British Columbia accreditation reversal ====
On June 11, 2014, 3,210 of the Law Society of British Columbia's 13,000 members voted in support of a resolution to reverse its decision to grant the faculty accreditation and requested that the province revoke its accreditation of the law program because of the view that it discriminates against unmarried couples and homosexual individuals. 968 members voted against with 8,822 not registering a vote. On September 26, 2014, the governing members of the Law Society decided to hold a binding referendum of their membership to determine whether to revoke Trinity Western's accreditation. Just over 8,000 BC lawyers voted in the referendum, with 74% voting in favour of a resolution declaring that the proposed law school at TWU would not be an approved Faculty of Law for the Law Society's admission program. Voter turnout was just under 60%.

==== Nova Scotia: Trinity Western University v Nova Scotia Barristers' Society ====
The case was brought before the Nova Scotia Supreme Court from December 16–19, 2014. Trinity Western argued that denying automatic accreditation to TWU law graduates is an infringement on the students' right to freedom of religion.

The Court ruled in favour of TWU on January 28, 2015, accepting the argument that, as a private religious university, the school had the right to uphold its own code of conduct "even if the effect of that code is to exclude... or offend others" and attempting to force TWU to change its community covenant was an infringement on religious freedom. The ruling further noted that the Nova Scotia Barristers' Society already requires all lawyers to follow its Code of Professional Conduct, which forbids all discrimination, so the Community Covenant would not affect TWU graduates in their practice of law.

The NSBS appealed to the Nova Scotia Court of Appeal. The Court of Appeal heard the appeal in April 2016, and upheld the Nova Scotia Supreme Court's ruling on July 26, 2016.

==== Ontario: Trinity Western University v The Law Society of Upper Canada ====
The case was brought before the Divisional Court of the Ontario Superior Court of Justice from June 1–4, 2015. Trinity Western argued that their proposed law school's graduates should not be refused automatic accreditation in Ontario by the Law Society of Upper Canada based on the Community Covenant Agreement, claiming that the decision would violate TWU students' rights to freedom of religion, freedom of expression, and freedom of association.

The Court ruled in favour of the LSUC on July 2, 2015, stating that its refusal to automatically accredit TWU graduates was a reasonable balancing of the Charter rights to equality and freedom of religion, and that the refusal of automatic accreditation was not a violation of TWU students' rights to freedom of expression or freedom of association. The ruling further noted that TWU graduates are free to apply independently to the LSUC for accreditation following their graduation.

TWU filed a motion to appeal with the Court of Appeal for Ontario in September 2015, and the Court of Appeal upheld the ruling in favour of LSUC on June 29, 2016.

==== British Columbia: Trinity Western University v Law Society of British Columbia ====
The case was brought before the Supreme Court of British Columbia from August 24–26, 2015. The Law Society of British Columbia had argued that TWU forcing students to sign the "Community Covenant" creates an unwelcome atmosphere for LGBTQ students and, given the high levels of competition for law school seats in Canada, would effectively create a two-tier system in which LGBTQ individuals would not have equal access to limited law school spaces.

The Court ruled in favour of TWU on December 10, 2015, overturning the LSBC's decision against accrediting the TWU law school and stating the LSBC did not "attempt to resolve the collision of the competing Charter interests [of equality before the law and freedom of religion]."

The LSBC filed an appeal of the decision with the British Columbia Court of Appeal on January 5, 2016, which was heard June 1–3, 2016. On November 1, 2016, the Court of Appeal upheld the previous decision, stating that LSBC's refusal of accreditation was unreasonable.

==== Supreme Court of Canada decisions ====
Both the Ontario and B.C. rulings were appealed to the Supreme Court of Canada, the cases appeared on November 30 and December 1, 2017, respectively. On June 15, 2018, the Supreme Court, across four sets of reasons, ruled in favour of the law societies in 7-2 for both Trinity Western University v Law Society of Upper Canada and Law Society of British Columbia v Trinity Western University.

The majority decisions said that TWU's Community Covenant would deter LGBT students from attending the proposed law school and that equal access to legal education, diversity in the legal profession and preventing harm to LGBT students was in the public interest.
