= Bachelor of Civil Law =

Degree in law

Bachelor of Civil Law (abbreviated BCL or B.C.L.; Latin: Baccalaureus Civilis Legis) is any of several degrees in law conferred by English-language universities. The BCL originated as a postgraduate degree in the universities of Oxford and Cambridge; at Oxford, the BCL continues to be the primary postgraduate taught course in law. It is also taught as an undergraduate degree in other countries. The reference to civil law was not originally in contradistinction to common law, but to canon law, although common law was not taught in the civil law faculties in either university until at least the second half of the 18th century. However, some universities in English-speaking countries use the degree in the former sense.

== Postgraduate degrees ==
=== The modern BCL: Oxford ===
At Oxford, the Bachelor of Civil Law degree is a taught postgraduate degree in English law, occupying a similar position as the Master of Laws (M.L. or LL.M.; Latin: Magister Legum or Legum Magister) programmes of other British universities, but specifically for Common Law degree holders. Students with Civil Law degrees following the same programme are awarded the degree of Magister Juris (commonly MJur). Oxford claims that the BCL is "the most highly regarded taught masters-level qualification in the Common Law world". The course differs from many LLM programmes insofar as it provides not only seminar and lecture-format teaching, but also the intensive small-group tutorials that characterize Oxbridge's undergraduate tutorial system. The principal mode of assessment for the BCL and MJur is end-of-year examinations held in Oxford's Examination Schools, after the end of Trinity term. The degree is either an overall "pass" or an overall "distinction", the latter requiring more than 70 marks in two or more of the four courses, and not fewer than 60 in any of the courses. The Vinerian Scholarship is awarded to the student deemed to have the best overall performance on the BCL; examples of past Vinerian Scholars include the Law Lords Lord Hoffmann, Lord Edmund-Davies and Lord Saville of Newdigate.

Historically, the BCL was established as the lower degree in Oxford's Faculty of Civil Law, the higher degree being the Doctor of Civil Law. The Faculty of Civil Law was so named to distinguish it from the faculty of Canon Law which was abolished in both universities by King Henry VIII in 1535. In the 16th century, it generally took three years to study for the BCL if the student had previously obtained a Master of Arts degree at Oxford (and one additional year if his degree was from Cambridge). It was, however, possible to enter the Faculty of Law directly after matriculation as a 'Student in Civil Law', without even a Bachelor of Arts (BA) first. In this case, it took four to six years to take the BCL.

From the 1850s until the end of that century, the BCL could only be taken by those who had an Oxford BA. At the end of the 19th century the course was restructured: while it was still possible for Oxford BAs to complete it in one year, graduates from other universities were also admitted to the BCL, though as a two-year taught degree course. This dual structure was still in place in the 1960s, but at least since 1991, the BCL has been a one-year course for graduates both from Oxford and elsewhere. In 1991, the MJur was introduced alongside the BCL, as a degree in European and Comparative Law. Around 2000, this was reshaped into a degree with the same structure and papers as the BCL, but for graduates from non-Common Law backgrounds.

The syllabus for the BCL consisted entirely of Roman Civil Law until the establishment of the Vinerian Professorship of English Law in 1758. Undergraduate examinations in law were not established until 1850, with the separate BA undergraduate 'Honour School of Jurisprudence' being established in 1872. Before 1960, there were seven papers, of which six were compulsory: 'Jurisprudence', 'Roman Law of Ownership and Possession', 'Roman Law of Condictiones', 'Common Law' (comprising the general principles of contract, torts, and the criminal law), 'Equity', and 'Conflict of Laws'. The optional paper was to be chosen from either the 'Law of Evidence', the 'Law of Negotiable Instruments', specified topics in Public International Law, or the 'Roman-Dutch Law of Testamentary and Intestate Succession'. In 1960, the syllabus was changed to six papers, of which four were compulsory: 'Common Law' (as above), 'Roman Law of Ownership and Possession', 'Equity', and 'Conflict of Laws'. The two optional papers were to be chosen from either the 'Development of Modern Jurisprudence', 'Roman Law of Condictiones', 'Law of Evidence', 'Criminal Law and Penology', 'Public International Law', 'Roman Dutch Law', 'Legal History: the Legislation of Edward I', 'Administrative Law', or 'Comparative Law of Matrimonial Causes'. For non-Oxford graduates, there was a preliminary examination after the first year. Presently, four papers can be chosen from a wide range of options.

The academic dress for both BCL and MJur graduates consists of the lay faculties' masters' gown with a hood of steel blue silk, half lined and bound with white rabbit fur.

=== The historical BCL: Elsewhere ===
The Faculty of Civil Law in Cambridge was renamed the Faculty of Laws after the teaching of English Common Law was introduced in the 19th century. The initial postgraduate degree in the faculty became the Bachelor of Laws degree (LLB, or LL.B.; Latin: Legum Baccalaureus), before being retitled LLM in the 20th century in order to clarify its status as a postgraduate degree. The BCL degree in Durham University is now also titled LLM. Within the UK, only the law faculty at Oxford has retained the older nomenclature.

Before it was renamed in 1969 as the LLB, the bachelor's degree in Common Law conferred by Canada's University of New Brunswick was known as the Bachelor of Civil Law.

Until replaced by the Juris Doctor (JD, or J.D.) in 1967, the Bachelor of Civil Law was the degree granted by the first law school in the United States, the William & Mary School of Law founded in 1779.

== Undergraduate degrees ==
=== Ireland ===
The BCL degree is also a standard law degree in Ireland. It is awarded by constituent universities of the National University of Ireland, such as University College Cork, University College Dublin, the National University of Ireland, Galway and the National University of Ireland, Maynooth. The BCL degree is also offered by Dublin City University. Other Irish universities, including the University of Limerick and the Trinity College Dublin, award the LLB degree. The LLB is offered at postgraduate level by University College Cork, NUI, Galway, and the University of Limerick also.

== Degrees specifically in civil law ==
=== Canada (BCL/LLB/LLL) ===
The legal system in Canada principally adopts the English Common Law legal tradition in all provinces and territories, excluding Quebec. For historical reasons, Quebec has a hybrid legal system born of its French heritage in civil law. As a result, universities in Quebec (and others wishing to offer degrees suitable for practitioners in Quebec) must provide training in Civil Law.

At McGill University, the bachelor's degree in Quebec Civil Law is called the BCL, to distinguish it from the first degree in Common Law (i.e., the JD, formerly the LLB) offered by that same university. Graduates earn both degrees concurrently; both are awarded after three to four years of study.

The University of Ottawa, although located in Ontario, also offers a baccalaureate degree in Quebec Civil Law, which it styles the Licentiate of Laws (LLL or LL.L.; Latin: Legum Licentiatus), to distinguish it from the first degree in Common Law (i.e., the LLB, now renamed JD) offered by that same university.

The other universities in Quebec that offer a baccalaureate degree in Quebec Civil Law (Université de Montréal, Université du Québec à Montréal, Université Laval and Université de Sherbrooke) call it an 'LL.B.' (French: baccalauréat en droit) though, in the past, the degree at Université de Montréal and Université Laval was styled as 'LL.L.'.

These bachelor's degrees in Quebec Civil Law are first-entry degree programmes which, like other first-entry university programmes in any discipline in Quebec, require a college diploma for entry or two years of prior university education. Except in the cases of both Ottawa and McGill, they are three years in length. The Common Law LLB and Quebec Civil Law LLL are combined in programmes offered by both the University of Ottawa, and McGill University. McGill offers a "transystemic program" of 105 credits. Students can choose to complete the curriculum in 3, 3.5, or 4 years. Admission to the McGill programme can be a first-entry programme, in the case of Quebec students (30 students every year are admitted straight out of college while others still need an undergraduate degree even if they are from the Province of Québec), though it is a second-entry programme in the case of students from other provinces (as three to four years of university studies is required, effectively at least two extra years of study more than for a college diploma).

While the baccalaureate degree in Quebec Civil Law is the terminal professional degree for entry into the bar admission programme of the Barreau du Québec, a candidate for entry into the training programme of the Chambre des notaires du Québec must, after that baccalaureate degree, go on to obtain a Diploma of Notarial Law through graduate study (Diplôme de deuxième cycle en droit notarial) from Université de Montréal, Université Laval, Université d'Ottawa, or Université de Sherbrooke: requiring two semesters of full-time study. At Université de Montréal, by completing two additional graduate-level law classes and doing a directed studies paper, the student may also earn an LLM in Notarial Law, in addition to the Diploma.

=== Louisiana (United States) ===
The Louisiana Civil Code requires legal practitioners in the state to have education in both Civil Law, and Common Law, and necessarily sets it apart from other jurisdictions in the U.S.

The Paul M. Hebert Law Center on the campus of Louisiana State University in the U.S. confers on the graduates of its law program a combined Juris Doctor / Diploma of Civil Law (styled D.C.L. or DCL) in view of the Louisiana Civil Law components of the program. The DCL (which was awarded as a BCL for those classes graduating in the 2003–06 academic years) reflects the 15 added credit hours of legal study in Civil Law, and comparative international law, in addition to that which is required for achieving the standard JD. The additional course hours, which are roughly equal to one additional semester of study, are generally achieved through a combination of taking summer course offerings, on campus or abroad, as well as via one or more other available routes offered by the Law Center.

== See also ==
- Civil law (legal system)
- Common law (legal system)
- Degrees of the University of Oxford
- Law Degree
