= King's Counsel Selection Panel =

Independent body that appoints King's Counsel in England and Wales

The King's Counsel Selection Panel is an independent and self-funding body responsible for awarding appointments as a King's Counsel within England and Wales.

== Background ==
In 2003, appointments to Queen's Counsel (QC) were suspended and expected to stop altogether as part of major reforms to the UK legal system. Whilst response to other elements of the proposed reform was generally positive, many from within the legal profession were critical of the proposal. Critics argued that the QC system was effective in combatting discrimination and that it provided a way for clients to differentiate between lawyers.

In 2004, the government opted to retain the title of QC, although it was accepted that major reforms were needed in order to increase the openness of the system and disassociate the appointment of QCs from the branches of government.

In 2005, the Queen's Counsel Selection Panel was set up to manage the appointment of Silks in the new system.

== Structure ==
The panel consists of at least nine members. At all times the panel must contain at least one senior barrister, senior solicitor, retired senior judge and lay members without legal qualifications. The chair of the panel is always a lay member.

All appointments to silk are the de facto responsibility of the panel, which passes a list of appointees to the Lord Chancellor who then officially advises the Monarch. The Lord Chancellor, who is a member of the Government, does not have any veto or influence over the system and must act on the advice of the panel.

Once the monarch formally approves the candidates, letters patent are drawn up and appointees are entitled to refer to themselves with the post-nominal KC and enjoy the professional advantages of the post.

Selection panel members
	2021	2025
Chair	Sir Alex Allan	Monisha Shah
Members	Rachel Langdale KC	John Montague
Members	Sara Nathan OBE	Sir Martin Moore-Bick
Members	Dame Anne Rafferty DBE	
Members	Dr Maggie Semple OBE	Jane Russell KC
Members	His Honour Phillip Sycamore CBE	Sultana Tafadar KC
Members	Andrew Walker KC	
Lay members	Christina Blacklaws	Amanda Amroliwala CBE
Lay members	Dr Douglas Board	Nicolina Andall
Lay members	Rosemary Rollason	Paul Grant
Lay members	Monisha Shah	Jonathan Heawood
Lay members		Diana Luchford

== Competitions ==
The panel runs an annual "competition" to appoint new King's Counsels. Applications are accepted from senior members of the legal profession who have higher rights of audience, no particular level of experience is required, but the highly competitive nature of the process ensures that applicants with few years' experience are not likely to succeed.

Applicants are expected to submit evidence of exceptional capability as advocates in the Higher Courts. They are required to name references (judges, colleagues and clients) who will attest to their competencies and attend an interview with two panel members. Applicants are judged based on the evidence submitted including their references, interview performance, ability and results attained in complex and important cases and key competencies.

As the panel is self-funding, applicants are required to pay the cost of their applications. For the 2026 competition, the non-refundable fee for all applicants is £2,275 (plus VAT) and another £4,000 (plus VAT). Applicants entitled to pay the concessionary fee for low incomes must pay £1,137.5 (plus VAT) and another £2,000 (plus VAT). In addition, applicants are charged £264 for the Letters Patent.

KC appointment statistics
	2007–08	2008–09	2009–10	2010–11	2011–12	2012–13	2013–14	2014–15	2015–16
Applicants	333	247	275	251	214	183	225	223	237
Appointments	98	104	129	120	88	84	100	93	107
%	29%	42%	47%	48%	41%	46%	44%	42%	45%
Female	20	16	20	27	23	14	18	25	25
%	20%	15%	16%	23%	26%	17%	18%	27%	23%
Ethnic minority	4	4	17	12	6	3	13	10	9
%	4%	4%	13%	10%	7%	4%	13%	11%	8%
Employed	0	2	0	1	1	0	2	0	0
Solicitor	1	3	1	2	0	1	5	5	3

== See also ==
- Bar Council
- Law Society
- Judicial Appointments Commission
