= ACTLA =

ACTLA may refer to:

- Alberta Civil Trial Lawyers Association
- Australian Capital Territory Legislative Assembly
