= Yassin Choukri =

Canadian former lawyer

Yassin Choukri (born c. 1968) is a former Canadian lawyer and former deputy attorney-general of the Canadian province of New Brunswick.

He was disbarred after the Law Society of New Brunswick ruled he had misappropriated more than $720,000 from 10 former clients.

He received a B.Sc. degree from the University of Moncton in 1988 and a law degree (LL.B.) in 1991. He was called to the bar in 1992.

A Fredericton man with the same name is listed in a database of high-stake poker players.
