= LSN =

LSN may refer to:

- Large-scale NAT in computer networking
- Law Society of Nunavut
- Learning and Skills Network, a former UK organisation
- Lenguaje de Signos Nicaragüense, Nicaraguan Sign Language
- Livingston North railway station, Scotland; National Rail station code
- Log sequence number in a transaction log
- London News Network (also known as "London Sports Network/LSN"), defunct UK television production company
- Los Banos Municipal Airport, California, US, IATA code
