= LSY =

LSY or lsy may refer to:

- Law Society of Yukon, the regulatory body for lawyers in the Yukon
- Lismore Airport (IATA: LSY), a regional airport located in the Northern Rivers region of New South Wales, Australia
- Lower Sydenham railway station (National Rail station code: LSY), a railway station in London, England
- Mauritian Sign Language (ISO 639-3: lsy), the indigenous deaf sign language of Mauritius
