= Royal Commission on the Inns of Court =

The Royal Commission on the Inns of Court carried out an investigation into the Inns of Court and associated Inns of Chancery between 1854 and 1855. The inns were medieval guild-like institutions that provided accommodation for lawyers and had developed gradually into centres for legal education. All barristers in the country had to be a member of one of the inns. It included many of the leading lawyers and jurists of the time. The commission found many of the inns, particularly the Inns of Chancery, were ineffective at educating students and recommended the creation of a single university of law. Steps were taken to accomplish this and a parliamentary bill was prepared but it was never achieved. The commission did, however, have an influence on legal education for decades and was a factor in the establishment of modern law schools at the universities of Cambridge, Oxford and London.

== Background ==
The Inns of Court were medieval institutions, similar to guilds, which served originally as accommodation and training to apprentices in law. They remain the only institutions able to call barristers to the bar (allow them to practice law in the courts). The system became more flexible in the 17th century with a relaxation of the residence requirements – students were only required to attend the inns for a certain number of dinners a year. Law began to be taught in the universities in the 18th-century but the inns retained a key role in assessing candidates for admission to the bar. There were (and remain) four Inns of Court. At the time of the royal commission none of the inns were corporate bodies but were regarded as voluntary societies, funded by the subscriptions of their members. A House of Commons committee had looked into the inns during an 1846 report on the state of legal education.

The Inns of Chancery were related institutions that were also established in the medieval era. They may have originally served as accommodation for the clerks of chancery who were responsible for writing legal writs but developed into preparatory inns for students who would go on to study law in the main four Inns of Court – each Inn of Chancery had an association with an Inn of Court. The Inns of Chancery flourished in the 15th century with the ten inns having a minimum of a hundred students each. In the 17th century the Inns of Chancery changed role and became associated largely with the training of solicitors as the legal profession began to separate into two distinct branches. The Inns of Chancery had effectively ceased to be places of education by the 18th century. The inns declined in the early 19th century as the result of the founding of alternative organisations for solicitors such as the Society of Gentleman Practisers in the Courts of Law and Equity and the Law Society of England and Wales. By the time of the royal commission there were just seven surviving Inns of Chancery. They have been described as survivals of the past by means of inertia and tradition.

== Report ==
The Royal Commission on the Inns of Court was established in 1854. Its remit included both the Inns of Court and the Inns of Chancery and its stated terms were to: "inquire into the arrangements of the Inns of Court, for promoting the study of Law and Jurisprudence, the revenues properly applicable to that purpose, and the means most likely to secure a systematic and sound education of students of Law, and provide satisfactory tests of fitness for admission to the Bar". The eleven commissioners appointed to the commissioner were: Sir William Page Wood, Sir John Taylor Coleridge, Joseph Napier, Sir Alexander Cockburn, Sir Richard Bethell, Sir Thomas Erskine Perry, John Shaw-Lefevre, Henry Singer Keating, Thomas Greenwood, James Stewart and Germain Lavie. Stewart seems to have had little involvement, not attending any meetings or signing the report when it was issued on 10 August 1855. The secretary was Julius Talbot Airey who received a 150 guinea allowance for his services.

The report noted that although "the present system of practical study in a barristers' chambers must be admitted to be very efficient in fitting the student for the active duties of his profession; it affords, however, no facilities for the study of the scientific branches of legal knowledge" and noted that in particular the Inns of Chancery were no longer effective in advancing the education of lawyers. Henry James Sumner Maine lobbied the commission to recommend examinations for barristers and implement measures to provide a broader understanding of the law amongst legal professionals. The royal commission recommended that the inns be incorporated as a single public body to function as a university of law (though they would be allowed to retain their current individual possessions).

=== Inns of Chancery ===
The commission held investigations into the condition of each of the Inns of Chancery then in existence. Nigel Cawthorne writing in 2016 noted that the commission failed to thoroughly investigate the inns and that they remained shrouded in mystery.

==== Lyon's Inn ====
The commission found that Lyon's Inn was established in the early 15th century. It reported that the inn had only two members (referred to as "ancients") and no students or library. The only recent transactions recorded were the collection of rents from its chambers, the rental of its hall to a debating society and the payment of a fee to the Inner Temple to provide a reader. No reader had come to the inn since 1832 allegedly because the ancients of the time were disgusted that he had "burlesqued the things so greatly".

==== New Inn ====
The commission found that the inn had ceased to train lawyers in 1642 and had not held a lecture since 1846. The inn sent a representative to the commission but he professed to have no knowledge of the function or constitution of the Inn and could not locate any ancient documents. The duties of the ancients were limited to collecting the rents of the chambers, some £1,800–1,900 per year. The inn had let its premises to the Middle Temple for 300 years in 1774, for an annual payment of £4.

==== Clement's Inn ====
The representative sent to the commission claimed to have seen papers dating Clement's Inn inn back to 1677 and that it may have once been a monastery. However many of the records were lost in a fire and many of those remaining were unreadable. The inn maintained a connection with the Inner Temple who sent a reader once a term until the 1830s. When queried as to why they had ceased sending a reader the Inner Temple claimed to have no knowledge of the arrangement. The commission recorded that Clement's Inn had no students and no library. It also had no chapel, though it maintained three pews at St Clement Danes as well as a vault in which the ancients were entitled to a burial.

==== Staple Inn ====
The commission heard evidence from the author of a book on Staple Inn in which he described reading manuscripts dating it to the reign of Henry V. Under questioning however he claimed the manuscripts were lost in a fire 70 years before and he had only attended the inn for the last sixty years. The author could not recall any students or readers attending the inn. The inn itself disclaimed all involvement with the legal profession, but stated that a reader used to be sent from Gray's Inn; though there was no record of what he read about or how he was paid. The commission heard that it was customary for the members of the inn to receive an invite to breakfast whenever a serjeant or senior barrister was called from Gray's. Unusually the tenure of chambers at Staple Inn was held for life, with tenants free to pass on the tenancy during their lifetimes (the new tenant would also hold the tenancy for life); only if the currently named tenant died would the chamber revert to the inn. The Prudential Insurance Company acquired the premises after its dissolution and maintained its structure, it is the last complete Inn of Chancery building to survive. Its Hall is let to the Institute of Actuaries.

==== Barnard's Inn ====
Barnard's Inn was represented at the commission by its secretary (who was also the treasurer). The inn claimed to date to the mid-13th century and consisted of a principal, nine ancients and five companions. All were entitled to the right to dine in hall and the ancients and principals were entitled to receive a share of the chamber fees. The inn used to receive a reader from Gray's Inn but this had ceased in the 17th century and there was no record of how much he was paid or what was read. The inn had no library, having sold all its books as being of no use. It refused entry to solicitors and successfully defended this policy in a court case of 1827. Its buildings were eventually acquired by the Worshipful Company of Mercers as a local preparatory school, Mercers' School from 1894. This closed in 1959 and only the Hall survives; it was used for various commercial activities until 1991 when it became the lecture theatre and administrative offices of Gresham College.

==== Other inns ====
Clifford's Inn, Symond's Inn (which is not included in many lists as an inn of chancery) and Furnival's Inn were not represented at the commission, being considered to be merely residential chambers and no longer exclusive to legal professionals. The original gatehouse of Clifford's Inn survives off Fleet Street and the old curtilage is still a modern residential building of that name; when the 'ancients' attempted to dissolve it and share the capital proceeds of the estate privately the High Court ruled that as the original intention of the institution was legal education then the capital be held as an endowment for pupilage bursaries at Inner Temple. A notable resident at Furnival's from 1834 to 1837 was the author Charles Dickens.

== Impact ==
The proposed merger of the inns into a university of law was approved by the senior management of Lincoln's Inn in 1863 and parliament drafted a bill in 1874 to make arrangements for the merger, however opposition from the inns prevented this from proceeding. The commission's recommendations with regards to the inns were considered radical and were not implemented. The Inns of Chancery proved to have outlived their usefulness and were wound up or absorbed into the larger Inns of Court – the last inn, St Clement's, was closed in 1903. For a long time the report of the Royal Commission contained the only public record of the private accounts of the inns of court; they remained secret until at least 1966.

Despite some setbacks the commission influenced improvements in legal education in the following years. In 1869 the four Inns of Court collaborated to produce regulations for a shared system of examinations. The commission also influenced the way law was taught at the University of Cambridge. The commission marked the start of a series of reforms in the field of legal education and led, around fifty years later, to the establishment of modern law schools at the universities of Cambridge, Oxford and London.
