= Catholic Pacific College =

Coordinates: 49.142850°N 122.602382°W

- Motto: Omnia proba, quod bonum est tene.
- Motto in English: Sift everything, hold on to what is good.
- Type: Private
- Established: September 1999
- Religious affiliation: Roman Catholic
- Academic staff: 6
- Administrative staff: 3
- Location: Langley, British Columbia, Canada
- Website: www.catholicpacific.ca

Catholic Pacific College (formerly Redeemer Pacific College) is a private Catholic post-secondary institution in Langley, British Columbia, which is located on the west coast of Canada. It is endorsed by the Cardinal Newman Society in The Newman Guide to Choosing a Catholic College. It was founded in 1999 as Redeemer Pacific College, and changed its name to Catholic Pacific College in 2015.

CPC is a registered charity with the Canada Revenue Agency.

== Partnership ==
CPC's Campus is located adjacent to Trinity Western University, a private Evangelical university, and offers courses cross-listed with TWU. Students receive a foundation in Catholic liberal arts as they work toward a degree in any of the undergraduate majors offered by TWU.

== History ==
Founded as Redeemer Pacific College in 1999, the college acquired the property at 7720 Glover Road on August 9, 1999, with the support of Archbishop Adam Exner, OMI, and opened that fall on September 6, 1999. The college achieved an affiliation with the Franciscan University of Steubenville and received a position on the Cardinal Newman Society's listing of approved authentically-Catholic colleges.
