= Society of Gentleman Practisers in the Courts of Law and Equity =

The Society of Gentleman Practisers in the Courts of Law and Equity was an 18th-century professional society for attorneys and solicitors in England and Wales. It was founded in 1739 or 1740 to improve the social standing of the professions and to implement professional standards. It was the first law society to be established in the United Kingdom, though its relationship to the modern-day Law Society of England and Wales is not certain.

== Background and founding ==
The Society of Gentleman Practisers in the Courts of Law and Equity was founded in either 1739 or 1740 by 28 elite London-based attorneys and solicitors. At this time (prior to the Judicature Acts of 1873–75) an attorney was a lawyer who practised in the common law courts of England and Wales, whilst a solicitor practised in the courts of equity/chancery. Up until the 18th century the attorneys had held themselves superior to the solicitors, but around the time of the formation of the society the two professions held equal standing. The society seems to have been partly founded in response to the public's distrust of the professions, partly as an attempt to improve the social standing of its members and partly as a reaction to the Attorneys and Solicitors Act 1728. This act attempted to regulate the solicitors and attorneys (as well as ecclesiastical court proctors) by instituting a compulsory five-year articleship, which the society supported.

The two professions represented by the society ranked below the barristers, who practised in the higher courts. Though the barristers had their ancient Inns of Court, they were somewhat late in setting up organisations dedicated to maintaining professional standards – only reforming education following the 1854 Royal Commission.

== Role ==
The society was a voluntary association and was the first professional law society in the United Kingdom. It flourished in the century of its founding, and was occasionally consulted by members of parliament when drafting new bills. In 1770 a branch of the society was established in Bristol, which was then considered England's second city.

As part of its drive to maintain standards the society attempted to expose "unworthy" attorneys, though it often lacked the necessary resources to do so. It attempted to standardise the training and qualifications of solicitors and attorneys and to close the social gap between them and the barristers. The society also sought to raise the fee payable to solicitors and attorneys. This had been fixed by custom since the 17th century and its real value had been reduced by inflation.

== Law society ==
The society was informally known as "the law society"; however, its relationship to the modern-day Law Society of England and Wales is unclear. A Law Journal article of 1924 and Professor Andrew Boon, writing in 2014, state that the society developed into the Society of Attorneys, Solicitors, Proctors and others not being Barristers, practising in the Courts of Law and Equity in the United Kingdom, which itself developed into the Law Society of England and Wales. However, Philip Ross Courtney Elliott, writing in 1972, states that this is by no means certain.
