= Law Society of Saskatchewan =

- Formation: 1907
- Type: Law Society
- Legal status: active
- Purpose: Public regulator of the legal profession
- Headquarters: Regina, Saskatchewan
- Region served: Saskatchewan, Canada
- Official language: English
- Executive Director: Tim Brown
- Affiliations: Federation of Law Societies of Canada
- Website: www.lawsociety.sk.ca

The Law Society of Saskatchewan is the governing body for lawyers in the province of Saskatchewan, Canada.

== History ==
The Law Society of Saskatchewan was established in 1907 under the Legal Professions Act, following the establishment of the Province of Saskatchewan in 1905. Prior to 1907, lawyers in the province were governed by the 1885 Legal Profession Ordinance of the North-West Territories, of which the successor provinces of Alberta and Saskatchewan had been a part.

On the occasion of its centenary, the Law Society published A Century of Integrity: The Law Society of Saskatchewan 1907 to 2007, by lawyer Iain Mentiplay, Q.C. Mentiplay had been the secretary-treasurer of the Law Society from 1979 to 1991, and then senior counsel and complaints officer from 1992 until his retirement in 1999.

== See also ==
- Law Society of Yukon
