= Federation of Law Societies of Canada =

Association of provincial and territorial regulators

- Fédération des ordres professionnels de juristes du Canada
- Abbreviation: FLSC
- Predecessor: Conference of Governing Bodies of the Legal Profession in Canada
- Formation: 1972; 54 years ago
- Members: 14 law societies
- President: Louis-Martin Beaumont
- CEO: Jonathan G. Herman
- Main organ: Council of the Federation of Law Societies of Canada
- Subsidiaries: CanLII
- Website: flsc.ca

The Federation of Law Societies of Canada (French: Fédération des ordres professionnels de juristes du Canada) is the national association of the 14 Canadian regulators of the legal profession. The 14 law societies are mandated by the provinces and territories to regulate the legal profession in the public interest.

== History ==
The Conference of Governing Bodies of the Legal Profession in Canada, formed in 1926, was the precursor of the Federation. The Federation was incorporated in 1972.

== Initiatives ==
The Federation works with law societies to develop and harmonize rules of conduct and standards for the profession, and undertakes initiatives at the national level. That includes the sharing of information on important issues and trends. The Federation also intervenes before the courts on behalf of Canada's law societies when issues involve the regulation of the legal profession, the rule of law, or core democratic values. It is also the international voice of Canada's law societies on regulatory issues.

In 2002, the Federation formulated the National Mobility Agreement which facilitated the practice of law across provincial jurisdictions.

The Federation's Task Force on the Common Law Degree released its final report in 2009. The report recommended that law societies for Canada's common law jurisdictions (all provinces and territories except Quebec) adopt a national minimum requirement for those seeking to enter bar admission programs. It proposed that law schools teach certain minimum competencies, a stand-alone ethics course, and possess certain institutional minimums.

== CanLII ==
The right of access to the law has been asserted through the Montreal Declaration. The Declaration was first promulgated in 2002 through the Legal Information Institutes of the world. In Canada, the National Virtual Law Library Group had presented a proposal for a free data base to the Federation of Law Societies of Canada in August 2000. Out of this initiative CanLII was created. CanLII is a non-profit organization that provides free access to legal information. It is funded by the Federation. The Board of Directors of CanLII reports to the Federation. CanLII's role is to address the interests of the provincial and territorial law societies as well as the needs of the legal profession and the general public for free access to law.

== Member organizations ==
The Federation is made up of 14 member organizations with one law society from each province and territory. The exception is Quebec which has two law societies, one for lawyers and one for notaries.

Jurisdiction	Society	Founded
Alberta	Law Society of Alberta	1907
British Columbia	Law Society of British Columbia	1869
Manitoba	Law Society of Manitoba	1877
New Brunswick	Law Society of New Brunswick / Barreau du Nouveau-Brunswick	1846
Newfoundland and Labrador	Law Society of Newfoundland and Labrador	1834
Northwest Territories	Law Society of the Northwest Territories	1978
Nova Scotia	Nova Scotia Barristers' Society	1825
Nunavut	Law Society of Nunavut	1999
Ontario	Law Society of Ontario	1797
Prince Edward Island	Law Society of Prince Edward Island	1876
Quebec	Barreau du Québec	1849
Quebec	Chambre des notaires du Québec	1870
Saskatchewan	Law Society of Saskatchewan	1907
Yukon	Law Society of Yukon	1971
