= Lone Star National Bank =

Bank based in Texas, US

- Industry: Financial services
- Founded: 1983; 43 years ago
- Headquarters: McAllen, Texas, United States
- Number of locations: 33 branches
- Area served: Texas
- Key people: S. David Deanda, Jr. (President and Chief Operating Officer)
- Products: Banking
- Services: Personal and savings accounts, certificates of deposit (CDs), personal and mortgage loans
- Number of employees: 1,680 (2017)
- Website: www.lonestarnationalbank.com

Lone Star National Bank is an American community bank with 33 locations in South Texas, United States, including the Rio Grande Valley and San Antonio, Texas.

LSNB operates with over 1680 staff in 33 locations in the Rio Grande Valley and San Antonio. As of 2016, the Texas Department of Banking placed Lone Star National Bank at 39 out of 100 according to asset size.

In 2015 the bank received a penalty for violating anti–money laundering regulations after some of the bank’s customers were identified as politically exposed persons without them having enhanced due diligence checks and at least one customer was convicted of money laundering.

== History ==
Lone Star National Bank opened its first location in January 1983 in Pharr, Hidalgo County with ten employees providing retail banking and commercial banking for small businesses. The bank subsequently opened more locations in the Rio Grande Valley, starting with a banking center in McAllen, Texas in 1994. In August 2000, it opened its first banking center outside of Hidalgo County in Rio Grande City, Texas. This was followed by a location opening in Brownsville, Texas in 2001. The bank's first office outside of the Rio Grande Valley was opened in Bexar County in San Antonio in early 2010 with three more centers added; one in 2011 and two in 2013.

=== Legal issues ===
The Office of the Comptroller of the Currency (OCC) on April 4, 2015, issued a consent decree for a $1 million civil penalty against Lone Star National Bank for violating the Bank Secrecy Act (BSA). The OCC identified BSA and anti–money laundering (AML) deficiencies with Lone Star National Bank's internal controls, independent audit, suspicious activity reporting, and foreign correspondent banking program. The Bank was already under a consent order from 2012 (2012-160) which required Lone Star National Bank to undertake remedial actions with respect to its BSA/AML program.

An additional consent order (2015-029) was issued on March 31, 2015, in regards to serious deficiencies in Lone Star National Bank's lending practices. This consent order designates Lone Star National Bank as being in "troubled condition."

Lone Star National Bank is one of several banks that federal prosecutors have alleged were used by corrupt Mexican politicians and business owners to launder drug cartel money in South Texas.

In a 2013 plea hearing of a Mexican businessman who admitted to laundering money, Assistant U.S. Attorney Julie Hampton said some of the bank’s customers “have been identified as politically exposed persons, and there is nothing indicating that Lone Star National Bank conducted additional customer due diligence regarding the tracking of those millions of dollars.”

== Services ==
Lone Star National Bank offers personal and savings accounts, certificates of deposit (CDs), personal and mortgage loans, VISA debit and credit cards and a free app for mobile banking, available on iOS and Android devices. The bank offers alerts for identity theft and fraud, aimed at customers over the age of 50, and youth banking services. The bank also provides investment services for retail customers, financial planning, mutual funds, education planning, 401(k)/profit sharing plans and estate planning.

Small businesses are offered the same amenities as individuals, along with merchant services, cash management, remote deposits, a business partner program, and check ordering. The bank also has an international division for foreign customers.

The bank also provides insurance for both retail and commercial customers, including homeowners insurance, automobile insurance, health insurance, and life insurance.

== Charity work ==
Each December, Lone Star National Bank hosts an annual toy drive for children in the Rio Grande Valley and San Antonio. The bank's multiple locations decorate Christmas boxes to generate interest and curiosity for the drive. The bank invites all residents of the Rio Grande Valley to visit its locations to drop off unwrapped toys of various types. Toys are donated to the Children's Advocacy Center in Hidalgo County Estrella's House, CASA of Hidalgo County, Monica's and Maggie's House, Sunny Glen Children's Home, Casa de la Divina Misericordia and The Children's Shelter in San Antonio.

Every February, Lone Star National Bank partners with Doctors Hospital at Renaissance to organize the Renaissance Cancer Foundation Gala. Proceeds from the event were donated to the Renaissance Cancer Foundation, which aims to assist both insured and uninsured cancer patients in the Rio Grande Valley. in 2014, more than $200,000 was raised at the event.

Twice a year, the bank offers commercial and retail customers free shredding of financial documents at the bank's corporate office in Brownsville. The event is aimed at reducing identity theft from discarded financial and personal information.
