= Law Society of Nunavut =

- ᒪᓕᒐᓕᕆᔨᒃᑯᑦ ᑲᑐᔾᔨᖃᑎᒌᒃᑯᓐᓄᑦ ᓄᓇᕗᒻᒥ; Nunavumi Maligaliuqtit; Barreau du Nunavut
- Abbreviation: LSN
- Formation: 1999
- Type: Law society
- Legal status: active
- Headquarters: Iqaluit, Nunavut, Canada
- Region served: Nunavut, Canada
- Official language: English, French, Inuktitut
- President: Alison Crowe
- CEO: Nalini Vaddapalli
- Affiliations: Federation of Law Societies of Canada
- Website: lawsociety.nu.ca

The Law Society of Nunavut (Inuktitut: ᒪᓕᒐᓕᕆᔨᒃᑯᑦ ᑲᑐᔾᔨᖃᑎᒌᒃᑯᓐᓄᑦ ᓄᓇᕗᒻᒥ; Inuinnaqtun: Nunavumi Maligaliuqtit; French: Barreau du Nunavut) is the law society responsible for licensing and self-regulation of the legal profession in the Canadian territory of Nunavut.

== Overview ==
The society was established in 1999 when Nunavut was created from portions of the Northwest Territories, most LSN members were formerly members of the Law Society of the Northwest Territories. It is based in the territorial capital of Iqaluit.

LSN operates in English and French, with an additional legal aid hotline offering services in Inuktitut.

== Governance ==
The Society has governing executive headed by a President and 4 other officers. The administrative unit has 3 members headed by a chief executive officer.

== See also ==
- Law Society of Manitoba
