= Alberta Civil Trial Lawyers Association =

Canadian provincial non-profit

- Abbreviation: ACTLA
- Founded: 1986
- Type: Lawyers Association
- Legal status: Active
- Purpose: Advocate and public voice, educator and network
- Headquarters: Edmonton, Alberta
- Region served: Canada
- Official language: English; French
- Website: https://www.actla.com/

The Alberta Civil Trial Lawyers Association (ACTLA) is a non-profit society established in 1986 under the laws of the Province of Alberta, Canada. Its members are principally civil trial lawyers who are members of the Law Society of Alberta.

ACTLA is dedicated to advancing the science of jurisprudence, training in all fields and phases of advocacy, upholding the honour and dignity of the profession of law, encouraging brotherhood and sisterhood among the members of the Alberta Bar, upholding and improving the adversarial system and trial by jury, and promoting the administration of justice and the public good.

== See also ==
- Law Society of Alberta
- Canadian Bar Association
