= Law Society of Alberta =

Self-regulating body for lawyers in Alberta, Canada

- Abbreviation: LSA
- Formation: 1907
- Purpose: advocate and public voice, educator and network
- Headquarters: 700-333 11 Avenue SW, Calgary
- Location(s): Edmonton and Calgary
- Region served: Alberta
- Official language: English; French
- Executive Director: Elizabeth Osler
- Website: www.lawsocietyalberta.com

The Law Society of Alberta (LSA) is the self-regulating body for lawyers in Alberta, Canada, established in 1907 which derives its authority from the Legal Profession Act of the Government of Alberta.

Its main office is located in Calgary. As of 2023, there were 11,000 legal practitioners in Alberta regulated by the LSA.

The mandate, composition and role of the board that governs the LSA—The Benchers—was established under the Legal Professions Act. There are 24 Benchers elected by their peers.

== Purpose ==
The Law Society is created and governed by Alberta's Legal Profession Act. As a law society, the LSA is much more than a professional association and every lawyer who practises in Alberta must belong to it. The society's mandate is to regulate the legal profession in the public interest.

The society is primarily concerned with the admission and discipline of lawyer members, making sure trust accounts are properly managed, educating the public, and preventing the unauthorized practice of law.

== Governance structure ==
The Law Society is governed by members of the profession elected by its membership to serve as benchers. In addition to elected Benchers, there are four lay benchers (non-lawyers) appointed by the Minister of Justice. There are 24 benchers in total (including the four lay benchers), each expected to serve three-year terms.

Benchers have the authority under the Law to "establish a code of ethical standards for members and students-at-law".

The society passed The Rules of the Law Society of Alberta to govern the society, to exercise the society's powers and duties, and for the management and conducts of its business and affairs.

The society is a member of the Federation of Law Societies of Canada.

== Admission ==
To practise law in the Province of Alberta, a person must be admitted to the bar and a member of the society. The society sets its own educational admission requirements. These include a Bachelor of Laws degree (which in turn requires preliminary university study), completion of a twelve-month period of apprenticeship with an experienced practitioner called articling, and completion of bar admission exams. Bar admission exams in Alberta are more akin to assignments that test practical application of the law instead of pure legal knowledge. In addition to these academic requirements, the Legal Profession Act requires that a candidate be of "good character and reputation".

The Alberta Bar is one of the few that still admits its members one at a time in a very personalized ceremony. Once admitted, lawyers in Alberta, as in other common-law Canadian provinces but unlike England, are both barristers and solicitors. Members of the society (and judges of the Court of Queen's Bench of Alberta and the Court of Appeal of Alberta) are also notaries public pursuant to section 3 of the Notaries Public Act, but unlike those who become notaries public through an appointment, members of the society do not have an appointment expiration date.

== Self-regulation and LSA Rules ==
The society has passed The Rules of the Law Society of Alberta to govern the society, to exercise the society's powers and duties, and for the management and conducts of its business and affairs.

=== Rules enforcement ===
The Law Society has supervisory and disciplinary functions over its members. This responsibility includes the task of enforcing the rules of the Law Society, and to discipline offending lawyers. To aid in this task, the society has passed the Code of Professional Conduct, which is in essence a written code of ethics to which all lawyers must abide. The ultimate sanction the society could impose is disbarment. A lawyer that has been disbarred is no longer legally able to practise law in Alberta. Lawyers can also be fined or suspended.

== Continuing Professional Development (CPD) requirement ==
Rules 67.1 defines Continuing Professional Development (CPD). Rules 67.2 and 67.3—suspended until May 2023—referred to individual LSA members self-guided plans. Rule 67.4, which was adopted by the Benchers in December 2020 allowed them to prescribe the form, manner, and time frame of CPD requirements. Non-adherence to this within a timeframe of 18 months, was enforceable by a penalty of suspension.

=== Response to TRC's Call to Action 27 ===
As of 2023, the LSA has only one mandatory continuing professional development (CPD) requirement—compared to other Canadian law societies which have much more—a one-time, four-hour, free online training course called The Path – Your Journey Through Indigenous Canada, developed by the Indigenous consulting firm NVision Insight Group, to respond the Truth and Reconciliation Commission's (TRC) Call to Action #27. In October 2020, the LSA Benchers—24 law society board members elected by their peers—approved a motion to mandate the Indigenous cultural competency education training course The Path intended for all active lawyers in Alberta as part of their ongoing CPD. Call to Action #27 "specifically called for law societies to ensure that lawyers receive Indigenous cultural competence training." Benchers said that the mandated education was also consistent with the LSA's "Strategic Plan goals of Lawyer Competence & Wellness and Equity, Diversity & Inclusion".

Action #27 requests that "the Federation of Law Societies of Canada [...] ensure that lawyers receive appropriate cultural competency training, which includes the history and legacy of residential schools, the United Nations Declaration on the Rights of Indigenous Peoples, Treaties and Aboriginal rights, Indigenous law, and Aboriginal-Crown relations." Skills training includes areas such as conflict resolution, human rights, intercultural competency, and anti-racism.

By 2023, the Canadian Bar Association, the Federation of Law Societies of Canada, most provincial law societies, and many Faculties of Law had "made commitments to respond to the Calls to Action" and were working towards reconciliation. This included the introduction of "mandatory Indigenous cultural competency training".

For most LSA lawyers, the date for completion of The Path training was October 2022—which represented an 18-month timeframe. By February 2023, an"overwhelming majority of Alberta's lawyers" had completed the online course.

Since completion of the module is required, all legal practitioners in Alberta who do not complete it, risk suspension.

One of the goals of The Path training is to "demystify" some legal issues and their practical implications related to the Canadian Constitution, the Indian Act, treaties—both historical and modern—, the 1969 White Paper, major Supreme Court rulings on Aboriginal Title, the Duty to Consult, and Accommodate, as well as the United Nations Declaration on the Rights of Indigenous People. This section also describes how the 2003 R v Powley affects Métis Hunting Rights. The first module clarifies terms such as "Indian," "Native," "Aboriginal," "Indigenous," "First Nation," "Eskimo," "Inuit," and "Métis." The second module looks at indigenous people in North America in the period from pre-contact to the mid-nineteenth century and includes regional differences, scientific theories and traditional stories. The module also clarifies the "nature and basis" for Inuit land claims and the establishment of Nunavut, Nunavik, Nunatsiavut and the Inuvialuit regions since the late 20th century. The third module covers the Indian Act and the way in which it established the colonial relationship. It examines Canadian Indian residential school system, Inuit relocations, the Sixties Scoop, and the Oka Crisis. The fifth and final module offers "suggestions on how to work and communicate with Indigenous colleagues and partners" and how to strengthen "relationships with Indigenous peoples".

According to Osgoode Hall Law School's Trevor Farrow, by 2023, the CPD cultural awareness requirement in Canadian law societies is "increasingly common".

=== Controversy surrounding Rule 67.4 ===
A vote was held on 6 February 2023 on the controversial resolution to repeal Rule 67.4. It was "defeated by a vote of 2,609 to 864, of the 3,473 votes cast".

The vote was the result of petition signed by 51 of the 11,000 active lawyers in Alberta who requested the repeal of Rule 67.4, which allows the Bench—the LSA's governing board—to mandate continuing professional development training.

In her 2 February response to the call for the repeal of Rule 67.4, Hadley Friedland, a University of Alberta associate law professor, said that mandated CPD requirements are common practice both at the LSA and other Canadian law societies. As well, in Green v. Law Society of Manitoba, the Supreme Court of Canada (SCC) found it was reasonable for a law society to mandate CPD, as was the disciplinary action for failing to complete CPD was automatic suspension. The SCC found that law societies have a "broad public interest mandate" and that their governing boards have the authority to fulfill this mandate through their rule-making power.

Friedland said that the controversy may be a culture war—over the LSA's obligations in terms of public interest—with one group "pushing a special resolution to eradicate mandatory CPD requirements, which is limited to learning about Indigenous legal history and traditions"—as it was described on Twitter—or a "vocal minority" who are using any means to spread their views.

Alberta corporate and real estate lawyer, Roger Song—who along with a colleague, Benjamin Ferland, had submitted a letter to the LSA challenging Rule 67.4—also initiated a petition to repeal Rule 67.4, which garnered 51 signatures. Since then, there has been "widespread discussion in the legal community" on whether or not Rule 67.4 should be repealed. Even though most Alberta's lawyers completed the training course, the topic is controversial, according to a 4 February 2023 National Post article.

Defence lawyer, Daniel Song, said that there were really two debates. The first was whether the LSA should be able to mandate education in the name of professional development courses as described in Rule 67.4; and the second was whether the legal system has a "history of systemic discrimination".

Concerns have been raised by a JCCF lawyer, Song, and others that the mandated CPD courses amounted to indoctrination, with Song comparing it to forced education policies imposed by the Chinese government that he experienced before immigrating to Canada. Farrow said that while he understands their concerns, the mandated CPD requirement responds to a "larger social project" focusing on an area where we have been "woefully undereducated". Song and his colleague in a St. Albert law firm, Benjamin Ferland, raised concerns in their July 2022 letter to the LSA that the rule was an unacceptable form of "cultural, political or ideological education". They clarified that, while they opposed the rule, their reason for opposing it was not based on a "belief that understanding Indigenous culture is unimportant."

In early February 2023, the LSA benchers released an open letter to their membership calling on them to oppose the repeal of Rule 67.4. with a vote scheduled for 6 February.

The response in support of keeping Rule 67.4 and using The Path was robust, which included an open letter signed by 400 lawyers. Others, who signed the petition, included non-active LSA members, "law professors, students and organizations".

Indigenous lawyer and director of the University of Alberta-based Wahkohtowin Law and Governance Lodge, Koren Lightning-Earle—who helped found the LSA's Indigenous advisory committee—told the Toronto Star that she was "discouraged" and "disappointed", but not "surprised" when she learned about the petition opposing Rule 67.4. She said that content in The Path on colonialism and Indigenous people in Canada was similar to the curriculum in primary schools that only began to be introduced in the 2010s. She said that, "People don't want to believe that these horrible things happened because then they think they have to feel guilty about it...Reconciliation isn't about feeling guilty. But it is about acknowledging and learning about what happened and paying respect to those that it happened to."

One of the lawyers who opposes Rule 67.4, Glenn Blackett—a Calgary-based lawyer who is part of the Justice Centre for Constitutional Freedoms (JCCF) lawyer network, published his reasons for his opposition in an article entitled, "Wokeness captures Alberta's Law Society", in which he said that The Path was "a form of "wokeness", He defines "wokeness" as a "radical activist and authoritarian movement[...]that has "captured" educational, charitable, media, governmental, financial institutions, and even the church in Canada. Blackett says the use of Rule 67.4. by the LSA is similar to the infiltration of wokeness into institutional professional regulators, threatening the professional licenses of Jordan Peterson and Christopher Milburn, a JCCF client. Blackett denies that there is any systemic racism in Canada's legal system. He says that indigenous Canadians are not essentially "different from other Canadians of any race" and they only need "civility, humility and caring" as does any person. He is critical of The Path online course, which he described as a form of wokeness driven by mid-20th century postmodern or French ideology advocating moral and metaphysical relativism. He cautions that the wokeness in the course content threatens freedom of speech and conscience guaranteed by the Canadian Charter of Rights and Freedoms. Blackett calls for Canada's legal system to return to 17th and 18th century Enlightenment principles which provide the animating spirit of liberalism. He says that both "wokism" and The Path, in general, are more likely to have the opposite effect of reconciliation. Their criticism of "Canadian history, people and [...] liberalism", for example is "insidious", "divisive", "wildly and irresponsibly" "accusatory". He says that the "woke" behind course reject a "shared humanity", lack humility, and are not conciliatory and that The Path course uses "subtle attacks"—microaggressions—criticizing specific words in the national anthem, for example. According to Blackett, The Path—and "wokeness" in general—deny the "concrete and identifiable causes" for "disparities like higher criminal offence rates, malnutrition and substance abuse, and lack of economic opportunity" experienced by the indigenous community. He said that the use of the woke lens disempowers indigenous Canadians, for example, by citing "systemic discrimination", "inter-generational trauma", and "colonialism"—which he described as "ethereal boogeymen" as the deep-rooted causes of these disparities between indigenous and non-indigenous Canadians. Blackett questions the agency of an indigenous community and even less so an indigenous individual to "change" these "ethereal boogeymen". This dis-empowering lens used by the woke in The Path, contributes to making indigenous people believe they are powerless. He compares this to the empowering knowledge where indigenous people and communities learn the "concrete and identifiable causes" for "disparities" so they can then take the "pragmatic steps" needed to "improve these things".

Friedland said that, they are compelling arguments to counter the petitioners rejection of the LSA's Rule 67.4 as related to the TRC's Call for Action 27, including reports by the TRC, the Inquiry on Missing and Murdered Indigenous Women National Inquiry report, the Office of the Independent Special Interlocutor for Missing Children and Unmarked Graves and Burial Sites, and the "plethora of reports on Indigenous people and the justice system.

Daniel Song—who is not related to Roger Song—said that the claim made by petitioners in their public statements that the cultural competency course is an "insipid offshoot" of "wokeness", are "embarrassingly irresponsible and inexcusably ignorant". Song said that it is a fact that there is "systemic discrimination against Indigenous people in Canada" as 30% of the incarcerated population are indigenous while only 5% of Canada's population are indigenous.

An Indigenous defence lawyer, Krysia Przepiorka, who took the course, said it was a "great response" to the TRC's Call to Action. She said that a lot of effort went into its production and it was "accurate", "fitting", "not 'sugar-coated'", and a "step in the right direction". She was disappointed in the opposition to The Path.

The consulting company that developed The Path course said it was an "online course on the history and contemporary realities of First Nations, Inuit and Métis in Canada."

== See also ==
- Canadian Bar Association
- Alberta Civil Trial Lawyers Association
