= Nova Scotia Barristers' Society =

Canadian provincial law society

- Formation: 1825
- Type: Law Society
- Legal status: active
- Purpose: Public regulator of the legal profession
- Headquarters: Halifax, Nova Scotia
- Region served: Nova Scotia, Canada
- Official language: English; French
- TEP and President: R. Daren Baxter
- Affiliations: Federation of Law Societies of Canada
- Website: www.nsbs.org

The Nova Scotia Barristers' Society is the statutory body charged with the regulation of the legal profession in the Canadian province of Nova Scotia.

The Barristers' Society is a member of the Federation of Law Societies of Canada, an association of the fourteen provincial and territorial bodies governing the legal profession across Canada.

== History ==
The Society traces its roots to the Nova Scotia Bar which was established in December 1749, after the City of Halifax was founded.

In 1797, a legal library was created when the Honourable Chief Justice Thomas A. L. Strange donated his personal collection to the province for the use of his fellow lawyers.

In March 1811, the Province enacted its first legal profession act, called "an Act for the better regulation of attorneys, solicitors and proctors, practising in the Courts of Law and Equity in this Province". Drafted by Attorney-General Richard John Uniacke, the Act provided that all of Nova Scotia’s lawyers would henceforth be barristers, rather than simply attorneys. It was the second legal profession act in British North America.

The Act was subject to seven-year periodic renewals and was renewed in 1818, however, it expired in March 1825 without being renewed. Within days, the Society of Nova Scotia Barristers was formed. In 1858, the society incorporated and was renamed the Nova Scotia Barristers’ Society. In 1899, it became compulsory for all practising lawyers to be members of the Society due to the passage of the Barristers and Solicitors Act.

The Legislature of Nova Scotia has enacted the Legal Profession Act, which gives lawyers in Nova Scotia the powers of self-regulation, through the Barristers' Society. In exercising its powers under the Act, the Barristers' Society is required "... to uphold and protect the public interest in the practice of law".

== Role ==
The Barristers' Society has four main functions:

1. regulate standards necessary for admission to the privilege of practising law in the Province;
2. establish standards for the professional responsibility and competence of lawyers in the Province;
3. regulate the practice of law in the Province; and
4. seek to improve the administration of justice in the Province by regular consultations with members of the public who have a particular interest in the purpose of the Society.

In addition to setting the requirements for call to the Bar and guidelines for law practice in the Province, the Society investigates and adjudicates potential professional misconduct amongst members. An appeal lies to the Nova Scotia Court of Appeal from the decision of the Society, on any question of law raised in disciplinary proceedings.

== See also ==
- Law Society of Newfoundland and Labrador
