= Law Society of New Brunswick =

- Barreau du Nouveau-Brunswick
- Formation: 1846; 180 years ago
- Type: Law Society
- Legal status: active
- Purpose: Public regulator of the legal profession
- Headquarters: Fredericton, New Brunswick
- Region served: New Brunswick, Canada
- Official language: English, French
- President: James L. Mockler, K.C.
- Affiliations: Federation of Law Societies of Canada
- Staff: 20
- Website: lawsociety-barreau.nb.ca/en/

The Law Society of New Brunswick (French: Barreau du Nouveau-Brunswick) is the statutory body charged with the regulation of the legal profession in the Canadian province of New Brunswick.

The Law Society is a member of the Federation of Law Societies of Canada, an association of the fourteen provincial and territorial bodies governing the legal profession across Canada.

== History ==
In 1846, the Law Society was incorporated as the "Barristers' Society" for the "purpose of securing in the Province a learned and honourable legal profession, for establishing order and good conduct among its members and for promoting knowledgeable development and reform of the law".

== Role ==
The objects and duties of the Society are:

1. to uphold and protect the public interest in the administration of justice;
2. to preserve and protect the rights and freedoms of all persons;
3. to ensure independence, integrity and honor of its members;
4. to establish standards of education, professional responsibility and competence of its members and applicants to membership;
5. to regulate the legal profession.

== See also ==
- Law Society of Alberta
