= Law Society of Yukon =

Regulatory body for lawyers in the Yukon

- Abbreviation: LSY
- Formation: 1971
- Type: Law society
- Legal status: active
- Headquarters: Whitehorse, Yukon, Canada
- Region served: Yukon, Canada
- Official language: English; French; Inuktitut
- Affiliations: Federation of Law Societies of Canada
- Website: www.lawsocietyyukon.com

Law Society of Yukon is the regulatory body for lawyers in the Yukon.

Founded in 1971 as Yukon Bar Association following the emergence of reforms that lead to the establishment of elected government and legislative council, it was renamed as the Law Society in 1985.

== Past Society Members ==
The body's first president was Erik Nielsen, who later became a federal MP and cabinet minister including time as Deputy Prime Minister of Canada.
