= Bar of Quebec =

Bar association of Quebec, Canada

- Barreau du Québec
- Founded: May 30, 1849
- Type: Law society
- Legal status: Active
- Purpose: Oversee professional legal practice Support member practitioners Foster collegial relationships within the membership Promote the rule of law
- Headquarters: Maison du Barreau; Montreal, Quebec
- Region served: Quebec
- Members: 22,500
- Official language: French
- Bâtonnier: Marcel-Olivier Nadeau
- Website: barreau.qc.ca

The Bar of Quebec (French: Barreau du Québec) is the regulatory body for the practice of advocates in the Canadian province of Quebec and one of two legal regulatory bodies in the province. It was founded on May 30, 1849, as the Bar of Lower Canada (French: Barreau du Bas-Canada).

== History ==
The beginnings of the Quebec Bar go back to 1693 when, as a Royal Province of the French colonial empire, Canadien advocates first tried to obtain official recognition and were refused by Governor Louis de Buade de Frontenac, who upheld the 1678 edict by the Sovereign Council denying recognition of the legal profession in New France. At that time, legal advocacy was carried out largely at the local level by an elected syndic, who would normally have had some education if not in the legal profession specifically, the Provost of Quebec (equivalent to an attorney general) being the only person required to have obtained formal legal education and training during that period in Canada.

French Canadian advocates would not be recognized for nearly a century, by which time (after the Battle of the Plains of Abraham) they had become British colonial subjects. In 1765, Governor James Murray of the new British Province of Quebec authorized the creation of the "Community of Lawyers" (Communauté des avocats), which granted commissions to its members allowing them to practise law as advocates, notaries and land surveyors. The precursor to the present-day Bar of Quebec, the Community of Lawyers, adopted the first-ever code of ethics and conduct.

The Bar of Quebec became an independent corporation in 1849 through the Act to incorporate the Bar of Lower Canada (11-12 Vict. [1849], c.46.) and was granted sole responsibility for admission to the study and practice of law. The Act authorizing the incorporation of the Bar of Quebec was influential elsewhere and inspired the formation of similar corporations, such as the State Bar of California.

== Admission ==
Admission to the Bar of Quebec is a prerequisite for practising law in Quebec.

Quebec applicants must be graduates of the law faculty of one of six universities: the Université de Montréal, the Université du Québec à Montréal, McGill University, Laval University, the University of Ottawa, or the Université de Sherbrooke. In addition, applicants must attend a four- or eight-month course at the École du Barreau (Bar School), and complete a six-month apprenticeship. Finally, applicants must pass a character and fitness examination before the Comité de vérification du Barreau du Québec (Verification Committee of the Bar of Quebec). Practising attorneys must complete 30 hours of continuing legal education every two years.

Lawyers from other Canadian provinces and foreign lawyers can be temporarily admitted (for not more than twelve months) by submitting an "Application for a Special Authorization for a Person Practising Outside Québec." They can also obtain semi-permanent or permanent full admission on application. Full admission for lawyers from elsewhere in Canada requires, among other things, that the applicant demonstrate adequate proficiency in French and successfully complete examinations on civil law and legislation. Foreign applicants may be admitted only by obtaining an undergraduate degree from a Quebec law school or by approval of the Bar of Quebec's Equivalences Committee, which may impose applicant-specific conditions for admission.

== See also ==
- Bar of Montreal
- Chamber of Notaries of Quebec
- Quebec law
