= Law Society of Newfoundland and Labrador =

Legal body in Newfoundland and Labrador

- Formation: 1834
- Founded: St. John's, Newfoundland Colony
- Type: Law Society
- Legal status: active
- Purpose: Public regulator of the legal profession
- Headquarters: St. John's, Newfoundland and Labrador
- Region served: Newfoundland and Labrador
- Official language: English; French
- President: Ian S. Patey
- Affiliations: Federation of Law Societies of Canada
- Website: lsnl.ca

The Law Society of Newfoundland Labrador founded in 1834 (as Newfoundland Law Society and current name in 1999) is the statutory body charged with the regulation of the legal profession in the Canadian province of Newfoundland and Labrador.
