= Chambre des notaires du Québec =

Law society in Quebec, Canada

The Chambre des notaires du Québec, or Chambre of Notaries of Quebec, is the regulatory body for the practice of notaries in the province of Quebec and one of two legal regulatory bodies in the province.

Founded in 1870 as the Provincial Chamber of Notaries after the merger of three regional notary bodies (Quebec, Trois-Riveries, and Montreal), it traces back to the regulation of notaries by the French since 1663.

== See also ==
- Bar of Quebec
- Bar of Montreal
