= Order of precedence in Manitoba =

Relative preeminence of officials for ceremonial purposes

The Manitoba order of precedence is a nominal and symbolic hierarchy of important positions within the province of Manitoba. It has no legal standing but is used to dictate ceremonial protocol at events of a provincial nature.

- The King in Right of Manitoba (His Majesty Charles III)
- Lieutenant Governor of Manitoba (Anita Neville, PC OM)
- President of the Executive Council, otherwise known as the Premier of Manitoba (Wab Kinew, MLA)
- Chief Justice of Manitoba (Marianne Rivoalen)
- Former Lieutenant Governors of Manitoba in order of seniority of taking office
  1. Pearl McGonigal, CM OM (1981–1986)
  2. Yvon Dumont, OM (1993–1999)
  3. Philip S. Lee, CM OM (2009–2015)
  4. Janice Filmon, CM OM (2015–2022)
  5. Anita Neville, PC OM (2022–present)
- Former Presidents of the Executive Council of Manitoba in order of seniority in taking office
  1. Edward Schreyer, PC CC CMM OM CD (1969–1977)
  2. Gary Filmon, PC OC OM (1988–1999)
  3. Gary Doer, OM (1999–2009)
  4. Greg Selinger, OM (2009–2016)
  5. Brian Pallister, (2016–2021)
  6. Kelvin Goertzen, (2021)
  7. Heather Stefanson, (2021–2023)
  8. Wab Kinew, (2023–present)
- Members of the King's Privy Council for Canada residing in Manitoba by order of seniority of taking the Oath of Office
  1. Otto Lang, PC OC KC (1968)
  2. Lloyd Axworthy, PC OC OM (1980)
  3. Jack Murta, PC (1984)
  4. Jon Gerrard, PC MLA (1993)
  5. Rey Pagtakhan, PC (2001)
  6. Raymond Simard, PC (2004)
  7. Vic Toews, PC KC (2006)
  8. Steven Fletcher, PC MP (2008)
  9. Shelly Glover, PC MP (2013)
  10. Candice Bergen, PC MP (2013)
  11. MaryAnn Mihychuk, PC MP (2015)
  12. Dan Vandal, PC MP (2019)
  13. Terry Duguid, PC MP (2025)
  14. Rebecca Chartrand, PC MP (2025)
- Members of the Executive Council of Manitoba in relative order of seniority of appointment
  1. Uzoma Asagwara, MLA (2023)
  2. Ron Kostyshyn, MLA (2023)
  3. Matt Wiebe, MLA (2023)
  4. Nahanni Fontaine, MLA (2023)
  5. Bernadette Smith, MLA (2023)
  6. Ian Bushie, MLA (2023)
  7. Malaya Marcelino, MLA (2023)
  8. Jamie Moses, MLA (2023)
  9. Lisa Naylor, MLA (2023)
  10. Adrien Sala, MLA (2023)
  11. Renée Cable, MLA (2023)
  12. Tracy Schmidt, MLA (2023)
  13. Glen Simard, MLA (2023)
  14. Mintu Sandhu, MLA (2024)
  15. Nellie Kennedy, MLA (2024)
  16. Mike Moroz, MLA (2024)
  17. Mike Moyes, MLA (2025)
  18. Carla Compton, MLA (2026)
  19. David Pankratz, MLA (2026)
- Chief Justice of the Court of King's Bench of Manitoba (Glenn Joyal)
- Speaker of the Legislative Assembly of Manitoba (Tom Lindsey, MLA)
- Puisne Judges of the Court of Appeal and of the Court of King's Bench in relative order of seniority of appointment
  1. Robert Carr (1983; supernumerary since 2006)
  2. Michel Monnin (1984)
  3. Kenneth R. Hanssen (1984; supernumerary since 2008)
  4. Kris Stefanson (1988; supernumerary since 2008)
  5. Rodney Mykle (1989; supernumerary since 2007)
  6. Gerry Mercier, KC (1989; supernumerary since 2009)
  7. Robyn Diamond (1989; supernumerary since 2011)
  8. Jeffrey Oliphant (1990; supernumerary since 2008)
  9. Albert Clearwater (1992; supernumerary since 2007)
  10. Alan MacInnes (1992; supernumerary since 2010)
  11. Holly C. Beard (1992)
  12. Perry Schulman, KC (1993; supernumerary since 2008)
  13. Barbara Hamilton, KC (1995)
  14. Freda Steel (1995)
  15. Brenda Keyser (1995)
  16. John A. Menzies (1996)
  17. Marc M. Monnin (1997)
  18. Deborah McCawley, KC (1997)
  19. Donald Little, KC (1998)
  20. Morris Kaufman (1998; supernumerary since 2010)
  21. Laurie Allen, KC (1998)
  22. Douglas Yard, KC (1998)
  23. Donald Bryk, KC (1999)
  24. Frank Aquila (2000)
  25. Robert B. Doyle (2000)
  26. Murray Sinclair (2001)
  27. Joan McKelvey (2001)
  28. Martin Freedman, KC (2002)
  29. Colleen Suche, KC (2002)
  30. Marilyn Goldberg, KC (2002)
  31. Shawn Greenberg (2003)
  32. Karen Simonsen (2004)
  33. Marianne Rivoalen (2005)
  34. Lori Spivak (2005)
  35. Lori Douglas (2005)
  36. A. Catherine Everett (2006)
  37. Michael Thomson (2007)
  38. Douglas Abra, KC (2007)
  39. Brian Midwinter, KC (2008)
  40. Robert G. Cummings (2008)
  41. Joan MacPhail, KC (2009)
  42. Chris W. Martin (2009)
  43. William Johnston (2009)
  44. William J. Burnett, KC (2009)
  45. Robert A. Dewar, KC (2009)
  46. Rick Saull (2010)
  47. Gerald L. Chartier (2010)
  48. Diana M. Cameron (2011)
  49. Shane Perlmutter (2011)
  50. Herbert Rempel (2011)
- Leader of the Opposition in the Legislative Assembly (Konrad Narth, MLA)
- Archbishop of St. Boniface (Albert LeGatt)
- Bishop of Rupert's Land (Naboth Manzongo)
- Archbishop of Winnipeg (Murray Chatlain)
- Metropolitan of the Ukrainian Orthodox Church
- Metropolitan of the Ukrainian Catholic Church (Lawrence Daniel Huculak, OSBM)
- Chairman of the Manitoba Conference of the United Church of Canada (Barb Jardine)
- Chairman of the Manitoba Conference of the Presbyterian Church in Canada
- Chairman or other representative persons of the following denominations as indicated below and whose person will be signified to the Clerk of the Executive Council from time to time:
  1. Lutheran Church
  2. Jewish Rabbi
  3. The Mennonite faith
  4. The Baptist Church
  5. The Salvation Army
  6. The Pastors Evangelical Fellowship
- Members of the House of Commons residing in Manitoba by order of seniority in taking office
  1. James Bezan, MP (2004)
  2. Kevin Lamoureux, MP (2010)
  3. Ted Falk, MP (2013)
  4. Terry Duguid, MP (2019)
  5. Leah Gazan, MP (2019)
  6. Raquel Dancho, MP (2019)
  7. Dan Mazier, MP (2019)
  8. Branden Leslie, MP (2023)
  9. Ben Carr, MP (2023)
  10. Rebecca Chartrand, MP (2025)
  11. Doug Eyolfson, MP (2025)
  12. Grant Jackson, MP (2025)
  13. Ginette Lavack, MP (2025)
  14. Colin Reynolds, MP (2025)
- Members of the Legislative Assembly
  - See Current members of the Legislative Assembly of Manitoba
- County Court Judges in relative order of seniority of appointment
- Magistrates in relative order of seniority of appointment
- Members of the local consular corps in relative order of seniority of appointment
- Mayors, Reeves and local government administrators in relative order of date of taking office
