= Richard J. Scott =

Canadian jurist (1938–2024)

Richard J. Scott OC OM KC

Chief Justice of Manitoba
- In office July 31, 1990 – March 1, 2013
- Preceded by: Alfred Monnin
- Succeeded by: Richard J. F. Chartier

Personal details
- Born: Richard Jamieson Scott; March 20, 1938
- Died: November 21, 2024 (aged 86)
- Spouse: Mary (m. c. 1961)
- Education: University of Manitoba
- Profession: Lawyer

Richard Jamieson Scott OC OM KC (March 20, 1938 – November 22, 2024) was a Canadian jurist who served as Chief Justice of Manitoba. In that capacity, he presided over the Manitoba Court of Appeal from 1990 to 2013. Among his most notable decisions are those in the cases Rebenchuk v Rebenchuk (2007), Manitoba Métis Federation Inc v Canada (Attorney General) et al. (2010), O'Brien v Tyrone Enterprises Ltd (2012), and, while he was on the Court of Queen's Bench of Manitoba, R v Lavallee.

== Early life and career ==
Scott was born on March 20, 1938, and raised in St. Vital, Manitoba, in what has since become a neighbourhood of Winnipeg. He had wanted to become a test pilot, but as his eyesight was not good enough, he turned to law. He attended the University of Manitoba, graduating with a Bachelor of Arts degree in 1959 and a Bachelor of Laws degree and a Governor General's Academic Gold Medal in 1963. He married his wife Mary c. 1961 with whom he went on to have three daughters.

Scott had started working for Thompson, Dilts, Jones, Hall, Dewar & Ritchie in 1961 and became an associate following his call to the bar in May 1963. He later became a partner in the firm (which adopted their current name, Thompson Dorfman Sweatman, in 1973) and was appointed as Queen's Counsel in 1976. He was the chairperson of the civil litigation subsections of the Canadian Bar Association and the Manitoba Bar Association from 1975 to 1978, he sat on the board Legal Aid Manitoba from 1976 to 1982, and he was a bencher of the Law Society of Manitoba from 1980 to 1984, serving as its president from 1983 to 1984.

== Court of Queen's Bench ==
Scott stayed with Thompson Dorfman Sweatman until 1985 when he was appointed to the Court of Queen's Bench of Manitoba. He appointed to the bench on June 28, 1985, and was promoted to be the Associate Chief Justice of the court three months later on October 4.

In 1990, he served as the trial judge in R v Lavallee, a case which was ultimately heard by the Supreme Court of Canada and which granted legal recognition to battered woman syndrome as a defence. The decision has been described by legal scholar Richard F. Devlin as "monumental".

== Chief Justiceship ==
On July 31, 1990, Scott was appointed to the Manitoba Court of Appeal as the tenth Chief Justice of Manitoba, succeeding Alfred Monnin.

=== O'Brien v Tyrone Enterprises ===
Among Scott's most notable decisions while sitting on the Court of Appeal was in O'Brien v Tyrone Enterprises (2012). In the personal injury case, the plaintiff's lawyers were representing her for a contingency fee and were "not prepared to front the costs of the medical and actuarial witnesses who would be required when the issues of damages were addressed unless the defendant was found to be liable." As the plaintiff's only income was the $7,000–7,400 per year which she received from her disability pension through the Canada Pension Plan, the plaintiff could not cover these costs herself and therefore applied for severance of the civil trial on liability and damages.

Such applications are rarely granted in Manitoba, in accordance with Justice Guy Joseph Kroft's decision in Investors Syndicate v Pro-Fund Distributors Ltd which held that it is the "normal preference of the court ... to hear and determine all issues at one time and to discourage the piecemeal trial of actions." However, Kroft acknowledged that severance may be granted in "appropriate circumstances" and provided a series of considerations that should be weighed by judges. Taking this into consideration, the motions judge, Justice Albert L. Clearwater, overturned the decision of the master and allowed the application, holding that "this is an 'access to justice' issue. Litigants in the economic position of this plaintiff, absent any evidence or suggestion that their claim is frivolous or vexatious or otherwise without merit, have little or no ability to fund the cost of litigation in today's economy."

Scott dismissed an appeal of the severance, citing the "modernization" of the Court of Queen's Bench Rules that took place since Investors Syndicate (including the amendment of rule 1.04(1), under the heading "General principles", to read "These rules shall be liberally construed to secure the just, most expeditious and least expensive determination of every civil proceeding on its merits") and the "trend, or evolution, in [the jurisprudence of other] provinces towards a more liberal approach to severance" with which he agreed. He wrote:

As we have seen, courts in other jurisdictions have moved decisively away from the view that consideration of financial hardship on a severance application is an error. In those instances where evidence of financial hardship has not resulted in severance being granted, it is often the case that either the plaintiff's impecuniosity was the only factor in its favour, or it failed to demonstrate that it would be beneficial to sever. Here the motions court judge, in the exercise of his discretion, while recognizing the criteria set forth in Investors Syndicate, gave, in the particular circumstances before him, significant weight to considerations of the plaintiff's impecuniosity and the resulting access to justice issue. In doing so, he did not err.

== Post-judicial career ==
Scott retired from the Court of Appeal on March 1, 2013, less than three weeks before he reached the mandatory retirement age of 75 years. Following his retirement from the bench, he joined Hill Sokalski Walsh Olson as counsel on February 2, 2015, where he conducts an arbitration and mediation practice.

In July 2017, he was appointed to the Supreme Court Advisory Board by Prime Minister Justin Trudeau. The board's mandate is to provide an independent, merit-based recommendation to fill the vacancy created by the upcoming retirement of Chief Justice Beverley McLachlin.

Scott died on November 21, 2024, at the age of 86.
