= Justice Centre for Constitutional Freedoms =

Canadian legal advocacy organization

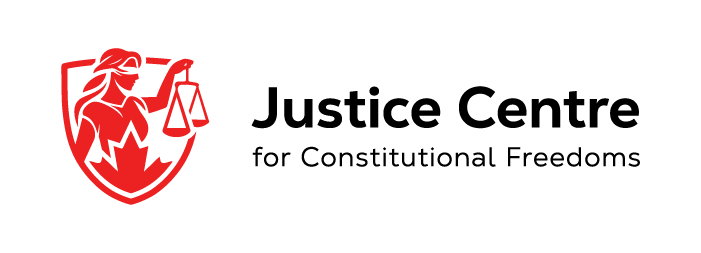
- Abbreviation: Justice Centre
- Formation: 2010
- Founder: John Carpay
- Registration no.: 817174865-RR0001
- Legal status: Charitable organization
- Purpose: Legal advocacy
- Headquarters: Calgary, Alberta, Canada
- President: John Carpay
- Website: jccf.ca

The Justice Centre for Constitutional Freedoms (JCCF) is a Canadian legal advocacy organization specializing in a libertarian, socially conservative approach to the Canadian Charter of Rights and Freedoms.

The centre has been involved in cases including Allen v Alberta, Wilson v University of Calgary, Yaniv v. Various Waxing Salons, and the revocation of vanity licence plates. They have also intervened on behalf of Trinity Western University in their fight to retain anti-homosexual college rules, and the Alberta news outlet Rebel News. In 2021, their founder John Carpay took a seven week leave of absence after hiring a private investigator to surveil Manitoba Chief Justice Glenn Joyal, who was presiding over a case the centre had brought.

JCCF was one of the lead backers of the Freedom Convoy in early 2022, providing its legal support.

== Organization ==
Based in Calgary, Alberta, the libertarian legal organization was founded in 2010 by John Carpay, a former Alberta provincial director of the Canadian Taxpayers Federation and a former candidate of the federal Reform Party and provincial Wildrose Party who later joined the United Conservative Party.

After getting a boost in funding from its opposition to COVID-19 pandemic public health measures, the organisation saw a revenue slow down towards the end of 2022, causing it to reduce staff numbers.

The organisation received approximately $6.5 million of funding in 2021.

In response to internal concerns that the organization was not in compliance with provincial law society rules, at the end of December 2022, the organization was planning to launch a separate legal entity to perform its legal activities. The organization was seeking to hire low profile litigators and to operate in a low profile manner to ensure that financial donations continued to flow toward the JCCF.

== Major court cases ==
The Justice Centre has argued cases in every province, including before the Court of Queen's Bench of Alberta, Court of Queen's Bench of Manitoba, and Ontario Superior Court of Justice.

=== Allen v Alberta ===
Allen v Alberta was a legal challenge to the Government of Alberta's monopoly on health insurance within the province (as it applies to seeking out-of-province treatment) by Darcy Allen, who had elected to pay $77,000 to undergo surgery for his chronic back pain in Montana rather than wait for treatment in Alberta. The case closely mirrored the 2005 case of Chaoulli v Quebec (AG) where the Supreme Court of Canada ruled that a government monopoly on health insurance, when combined with extremely long wait lists before care could be provided, was a violation of the individual's right to life, liberty, and security of the person, all of which are guaranteed under section 7 of the Canadian Charter of Rights and Freedoms.

The Court of Queen's Bench ruled against Allen on 31 March 2014.

=== Wilson v University of Calgary ===
A campus anti-abortion club caused controversy at the University of Calgary when they erected a graphic display as part of a "Genocide Awareness Project," which illustrated results of an abortion along with historical atrocities such as the Holocaust and the Rwandan genocide. This case was the ninth time in which the group had put on the display. University security staff requested that the students turn the graphic portions of their display inward, away from passers-by. When the eight students running the display refused to comply, the university initiated non-academic misconduct proceedings against them. The school's Vice-Provost ruled that the actions constituted misconduct and penalized the students with a formal written warning.

This penalty was appealed to the University of Calgary's Board of Governors, which refused to hear the appeal and upheld the penalty. The students then requested that the Court of Queen's Bench order the Board of Governors to allow an appeal. The court ruled in April 2014 that the Board of Governors' decision not to hear the appeal of the students "[lacked] justification, transparency and intelligibility" and ordered the board to hear the students' appeal.

=== 2019 licence plate challenges ===
In 2019, the Justice Centre represented three individuals in cases related to licence plates that were revoked due to complaints — two in Manitoba, one in Nova Scotia. John Carpay stated that without such action, "we move closer to a society where people have a legal right not to feel offended which means that there's less freedom of expression." The Canadian Civil Liberties Association expressed support for the plaintiffs in these cases.

The Manitoba plates were "ASIMIL8", issued to a Star Trek fan, and "NDN CAR", issued to a First Nations man in reference to the song NDN Kar by Keith Secola. In October 2019, the Court of Queen's Bench of Manitoba upheld the decision of Manitoba Public Insurance to take back the "ASIMIL8" because of the association of that word with the forced assimilation of Indigenous people. An agreement was reached between the owner and Manitoba Public Insurance to return the "NDN CAR" plate to its owner.

The Nova Scotia plate was "GRABHER", which caused controversy as the surname of the car's driver, Lorne Grabher, is similar to the phrase "grab her". A decision of the Nova Scotia Supreme Court upheld the province's decision to revoke the plate.

=== Yaniv v. Various Waxing Salons ===
In 2019, the Justice Centre represented five estheticians in Yaniv v. Various Waxing Salons before the British Columbia Human Rights Tribunal. The complainant, Jessica Yaniv, a trans woman, filed discrimination complaints against 13 waxing salons alleging that they refused to provide Brazilian waxes to her because she is transgender. In response to the complaints, several of the estheticians said that they lacked the required training to wax male genitalia, or that they were not comfortable doing so for religious or personal reasons. The Tribunal ruled against Yaniv and ordered her to pay $6,000 in restitution split equally among three of the service providers. The ruling was critical of Yaniv, stating that she "targeted small businesses, manufactured the conditions for a human rights complaint, and then leveraged that complaint to pursue a financial settlement from parties who were unsophisticated and unlikely to mount a proper defence", and admonished her for using human rights law as a "weapon" to "penalize" marginalized women with a racial animus and for filing in such a volume for financial gain. On 7 January 2020, the Justice Centre announced it was representing another salon in an additional complaint filed by Yaniv in early October 2019. In September 2020 it was announced that Yaniv had withdrawn her complaints against these salons.

=== Trinity Western University ===
In 2012 the private evangelical school Trinity Western University (TWU) completed a proposal to establish its own law school. Several groups objected to the establishment of this law school because of TWU's Community Covenant Agreement, a code of conduct, which is mandatory for all students to agree to. Unlike codes of conduct at many universities throughout Canada, however, TWU's Community Covenant Agreement requires explicit acceptance of an evangelical ethical framework including bans on gossip, vulgar language, pornography, and sexual conduct "that violates the sacredness of marriage between a man and a woman".

As a result of opposition to the Community Covenant Agreement the memberships of the Law Society of Upper Canada (now the Law Society of Ontario), the Law Society of British Columbia, and the Nova Scotia Barristers' Society voted to not accredit the law school.

Both the Ontario and BC rulings were appealed to the Supreme Court of Canada, with the Justice Centre intervening in both cases. On 15 June 2018 the Supreme Court ruled in favour of the law societies in 7–2 decisions for both Trinity Western University v Law Society of Upper Canada and Law Society of British Columbia v Trinity Western University. The majority decisions said that TWU's Community Covenant would deter LGBT students from attending the proposed law school and that equal access to legal education, diversity in the legal profession and preventing harm to LGBT students were in the public interest.

=== Candice Servatius Charter Rights case ===
JCCF represented Candice Servatius, the mother of a primary school student in Port Alberni, British Columbia on Vancouver Island's west coast on the traditional territory of the Nuu-chah-nulth people in Servatius v. Alberni School District No. 70. In the lawsuit, which was launched in 2016, the plaintiff—an evangelical Protestant— claimed that a smudging ceremony performed by a Nuu-chah-nulth elder and a hoop dancer performance at the school violated the Charter rights of her children. Over 30% of students in School District No. 70 are indigenous. In his 2020 decision, BC Supreme Court Justice Douglas Thompson ruled that there was no Charter violation as both performances were educational, not religious. However, he also ordered that both the School District and the appellant should pay their own costs, as the case was of "general public interest". Justice Thompson said that because the plaintiff had limited means, her costs were waived. He added that schools had to ensure that parents knew participation at these events were optional. Both the appellant and the School District appealed the Supreme Court decision—the latter on the issue of costs. Jay Cameron, representing the mother, said that the decision was a disappointment for "citizens from any religion or cultural background, each of whom has a constitutional right to be free from state-compelled spirituality".

On 12 December 2022, a panel of judges of the Court of Appeal for British Columbia agreed with Justice Thompson that there were no infringements on Charter rights. Justice Susan Griffin, writing on behalf of the appeal court panel judges, said that the province of British Columbia had adopted the United Nations Declaration on the Rights of Indigenous Peoples (UNDRIP) in 2019, which included the incorporation of "Indigenous culture and perspectives into the public school curriculum." The appeal court had learned that JCCF—described as a "special interest group" and "Christian activist organization"—had "secretly" funded her case. The lack of transparency had influenced the 2020 Supreme Court decision to waive the appellants costs. The appeals court ruled that she was responsible for the costs for both the supreme court and appeal court hearings for the School District and her own legal costs associated with "wasting judicial resources on minor complaints that would not usually justify a lawsuit". JCCF said they would not pay the court costs for the mother, but they would organize a fund raiser to assist her.

== Activities ==
=== Campus Freedom Index ===
The JCCF created the Campus Freedom Index and each year, the Centre rates about 52 Canadian universities using letter grades on their "policies and actions to protect freedom of speech". In 2014, the JCCF's 2014 gave the F rating to 13 Canadian universities and unions, according to The Chronicle Herald. Of the 13, three had "actively censored controversial or unpopular speech on campus", according to JCCF—ten were cited for "not indicating they would deviate from past practice".

According to a 5 November 2012, National Post opinion piece by Carpay and Michael Kennedy, Canadian universities and students' unions get a failing grade in the JCCF's Campus Freedom Index on adherence to principles of freedom of speech.

Officials at Ryerson University received a low score in JCCF's 2012 Campus Freedom Index. In response the university said that the Index does not take into account legal anti-hate speech provisions under federal and provincial laws.

In a 2014 response to the annual Index, the Cape Breton University Students' Union president, Brandon Ellis, said that they no longer return the JCCF calls. Ellis said that the formulaire that JCCF's sends to universities and unions every year are "very politically motivated". The Students' Union had filled them in in previous years". In 2014, Ellis said, "I just didn't want our students union to have any part of it."

In 2014, Dalhousie University—which is considered to be the 15th highest rating research universities in Canada— received an F rating on Campus Freedom Index, instead of a previous D rating, "because of its support for a group's move to have the university divest itself of investment in fossil fuels."

Cape Breton University's (CBU) 2014 F rating on the Index, protested the 2006 CAN$2,100 fine imposed by CBU on David George Mullan—an ordained Baptist minister, who taught History and Religious Studies at CBU from 1989 to 2016, for discriminating against the GLBTQ community as defined under CBU's Discrimination and Harassment Policy for discriminating against the GLBTQ community, which is also covered in Section 5 of the Nova Scotia Human Rights Act and adopted by CBU. On 15 February 2006, Mullan had posted on his UCB academic the contents of the email of a student—who was then a coordinator of the CBU's diversity centre—changing the spelling from to the "Perversity" Centre. The website post included the diversity coordinator's personal contact information and place of work. Mullen also published a photo of himself holding an automatic weapon with the inscription, Nemo me impune lacessit—"No one provokes me with impunity. In 2004, Mullan had posted a series of letters that he had written to the Bishop of the Anglican Church of Canada, criticizing the changing stance on homosexuality in the Anglican church. The Anglican church had been split apart, following the 2003 appointment of the first openly gay American Anglican bishop, Gene Robinson. Mullan was involved in another 2006 incident when a CBU communications professor, Celeste Sulliman, sought a peace bond against him—he had published her name and her department on a list he posted on his "Bear Blog", on a "death watch" list, according to a CBC News report. Sulliman's students had disrupting CBU classes on International Women's Day, in March 2006. The CBU's 2014 low Campus Freedom Index cited this 2006 fine as the reason for the F rating.

Writer Lindsay Shepherd, former Teaching Assistant at Wilfrid Laurier University joined the Justice Centre in 2019 to promote free speech on campuses.

=== Challenge to constitutionality of COVID-19 public health restrictions ===
Carpay filed a lawsuit in May 2020, challenging the constitutionality of Bill 2 introduced during the premiership of Jason Kenney, which was put in place to respond to the COVID-19 pandemic in Alberta. Carpay has been a member of Alberta's governing United Conservative Party (UCP), and a supporter of Premier Kenney.

In December 2020, John Carpay and JCCF lawyer James Kitchen launched a lawsuit against the government of the province of Alberta alleging that the 24 November 2020 public health restrictions "interfere with Albertans' charter rights". Kitchen is representing James Coates, the pastor of the GraceLife Church near Edmonton, Alberta. Since his arrest on 17 February 2021, by the RCMP, Coates has remained in prison for refusing to comply with Alberta Health Services Public Health Act legislation introduced in 2020 in response to COVID-19. Coates refused to cap attendance capacity at 15% and did not comply with requirements for masking and physical distancing of congregants in his GraceLife Church. COVID-19 deniers have protested in support of Coates.

During the COVID-19 pandemic, the JCCF was able to expand its assets from $133,271 to about $1.7 million in 2020, through fundraising off the anti-public health lawsuits it pursued.

In January 2022, the JCCF represented students in a lawsuit against Seneca College's vaccine mandate instituted in 2021. After losing the case, the JCCF was ordered to pay slightly over $150,000 in legal costs to the college because of its substantial assets and their client's inability to pay legal costs.

=== Surveillance of members of the judiciary ===
In July 2021, the JCCF founder John Carpay retained a private investigator to follow Manitoba Chief Justice Glenn Joyal in an effort to catch him breaking COVID-19 rules. The JCCF sought to humiliate him while he presided over a JCCF constitutional challenge of The Public Health Act (Manitoba). Justice Joyal had been followed by a vehicle on July 8 after leaving a court building, and noted that the private investigator followed him to his private residence and had a teenage boy ring his doorbell to seek to confirm that he lived there. The Winnipeg Police Service and the Government of Manitoba's internal security and intelligence unit investigated the incident, and according to the National Post Justice Joyal stated that the investigator was hired, "for the clear purpose of gathering what was hoped would be potentially embarrassing information in relation to my compliance with COVID public health restrictions ... I am deeply concerned and troubled". Soon afterwards Carpay was subject to misconduct complaints to various bar associations, and was "indefinitely suspected" before returning to work seven weeks later. The CBC next reported that the JCCF board said, "that an interim president would be appointed, and that there would be a review of operations and decision-making at the organization."

Carpay was arrested for his role in the surveillance of the chief justice on 30 December 2022 and released the subsequent day. Carpay has been charged with "intimidation of a justice system participant and attempting to obstruct justice." A second JCCF employee was arrested on 11 January 2023 and then charged with both attempt to obstruct justice and intimidation of a justice system participant.
