= Judge Goldberg =

Judge Goldberg may refer to:

- Alan Goldberg (judge) (1940–2016), judge of the Federal Court of Australia
- Allen S. Goldberg (fl. 1960s–2010s), judge of the Circuit Court of Cook County, Illinois
- Irving Loeb Goldberg (1906–1995), judge of the United States Court of Appeals for the Fifth Circuit
- Marilyn Goldberg (fl. 1970s–2000s), judge of the Family Division of the Manitoba Court of Queen's Bench
- Mitchell S. Goldberg (born 1959), judge of the United States District Court for the Eastern District of Pennsylvania
- Patricia Pérez Goldberg (born 1974), Chilean judge of the Inter-American Court of Human Rights
- Richard W. Goldberg (1927–2023), judge of the United States Court of International Trade
- Stanley Goldberg (born 1939), special trial judge of the United States Tax Court

== See also ==
- Justice Goldberg (disambiguation)
