= Catherine Everett =

Catherine Everett may refer to:

- A. Catherine Everett, Canadian judge
- Catherine Everett (painter) (born 1957), Canadian abstract painter
