= Alfred Monnin =

Alfred Maurice Monnin OC OM QC (March 6, 1920 – November 29, 2013) was a judge in Manitoba, Canada.

He was appointed to the Manitoba Court of Queen's Bench in 1957 and to the Manitoba Court of Appeal in 1962. In 1983 he was appointed Chief Justice of Manitoba. He retired from the Bench in 1990.

Born in Winnipeg, Manitoba to parents Alphonse-Louis Monnin and Adèle Sperisen, he received a Bachelor of Arts in 1939 from Collège universitaire de Saint-Boniface. After serving in World War II in the Canadian Corps, he received a Bachelor of Law in 1946.

In 1998, he oversaw a commission of inquiry into a vote-splitting scandal in the 1995 provincial election. He had previously served as Chief Justice of Manitoba.

The Monnin Inquiry was called after accusations that local organizers from the Progressive Conservative Party organized and funded candidates of another party, Independent Native Voice, to split the left-of-centre vote with the New Democratic Party in three constituencies. Monnin found that the PC organizers were guilty of inducing at least one INV candidate, Darryl Sutherland, to enter the campaign. Senior PC organizer Taras Sokolyk was personally implicated in the scandal.

Monnin described the actions of the Conservative organizers as an "unconscionable debasement of a citizen's right to vote" and claimed "in all my years on the Bench I have never encountered as many liars in one proceeding as I did during this inquiry."

He has received an honorary Doctor of Laws, University of Winnipeg (May 28, 1972), Doctor of the University, honoris causa, University of Ottawa (October 1972), Doctor of the University, honoris causa, Université Laval (June 1, 1974) and an Honorary Doctor of Laws, University of Manitoba (1979).

In 1990, he was awarded the Order of Canada for having "distinguished himself on the bench for more than 30 years, during which he contributed greatly to the province's legal system."

In 2000, he was awarded the Order of Manitoba. He has also been appointed a member of L'Ordre des francophones d'Amérique (1979), and an Officer of the French Legion of Honour. He is also a recipient of the Prix Riel, a distinction awarded to Franco-Manitobans who have contributed in a meaningful way to the representation and expansion of francophone culture in Manitoba.

Two of his sons, Michel and Marc Monnin, currently serve on the Manitoba Court of Appeal. His daughter-in-law, Laurie Allen, currently serves on the bench in Manitoba and another daughter-in-law, Donna Miller Q.C., is currently the Deputy Minister of Justice (Manitoba).
