= Bitter Honey =

Bitter Honey may refer to:

== Books ==
- Bitter Honey, by Francis Pollock 1935
- Bitter Honey, romantic novel by Helen Brooks (Rita Bradshaw) 1993
- Bitter Honey (Grenki med), a novel by Andrej E. Skubic 1999
- Bitter Honey, novel by Martin Joseph Freeman

== Film ==
- Bitter Honey, a 200 Nigerian film starring Hanks Anuku
- Bitter Honey (2014 film), a documentary film that chronicles the lives of three polygamous families

== Music ==
- Bitter Honey (Eef Barzelay album)

=== Songs ===
- "Miel amarga" (English: "Bitter Honey"), a ranchera song by Mexican recording artist Irma Serrano, 1966
- "Bitter Honey", song by Paul Williams
- "Bitter Honey", single by Ali Tennant, 1998
- "Bitter Honey", by Angelou from While You Were Sleeping, 2009
