= Martin Freeman (disambiguation) =

Martin Freeman (born 1971) is an English actor.

Martin Freeman may also refer to:

- Martin Freeman (sailor) (1814–1894), American Civil War sailor and Medal of Honor recipient
- Martin Henry Freeman (1826–1889), American-Liberian academic administrator
- A. Martin Freeman (1878–1959), British scholar of Irish texts and music
- Martin Joseph Freeman (1899–1969), American scholar of English literature and novelist

== See also ==
- Martin Freedman, judge
- Martin Friedman (disambiguation)
