= Wild Honey =

Wild Honey or Wildhoney may refer to:

== Film and theatre ==
- Wild Honey (play), a 1984 play by Michael Frayn
- Wild Honey (1918 film), a silent film Western
- Wild Honey (1922 film), a silent film
- Wild Honey, a 1942 Barney Bear cartoon

== Music ==
- Wildhoney (band), an American band
- Wild Honey, a late-1970s American girl group featuring Freddi Poole
- Wild Honey, a 1970s American band formed by Ron Townson

=== Albums ===
- Wild Honey (album), an album by the Beach Boys
- Wildhoney (album), an album by Tiamat
- Birrkuta – Wild Honey, an album by Yothu Yindi

=== Songs ===
- "Wild Honey" (The Beach Boys song)
- "Wild Honey" (U2 song)
- "Wild Honey", a song by Dr. John from City Lights
  - "Wild Honey", a 2013 cover by Hugh Laurie from Didn't It Rain
- "Wild Honey", a 1980 song by Van Morrison from Common One

== Literature ==
- Wild Honey, 1964 collection of poetry by Alistair Te Ariki Campbell
- Wild Honey, 1982 novel by Fern Michaels
- 'Wild Honey from Various Thyme, 1908 collection of poetry by Michael Field
- Wild Honey, a 2006 young adult novel in the series The Phantom Stallion by Terri Farley

== See also ==
- Bitter Honey (disambiguation)
- Honey (disambiguation)
- Wild at Honey, an album by Guitar Vader
- "Wild Honey Pie", by the Beatles
