= Sylvia Guertin-Riley =

Sylvia Guertin-Riley QC was appointed a judge of the Family Division of the Manitoba Court of Queen's Bench, Manitoba, Canada on July 27, 1995. Unlike most of her colleagues, she filled a newly created position, instead of replacing another judge.

Guertin-Riley graduated in law from the University of Manitoba Law School in 1980, and was called to the Manitoba Bar in 1981. She then joined the firm of Schwartz, McJannet & Co. and became a partner in 1987. From 1988 until her appointment to the bench, she was a partner with the firm of Riley, Orle, Guertin, Born. She practised mainly civil litigation, family law and labour law.

On September 16, 2006, Guertin-Riley elected to become a supernumerary judge and retired in September 2011.
