= St. Paul's High School (Winnipeg) =

Private school in Manitoba

Saint Paul's High School
- School coat of arms

Location
- 2200 Grant Avenue; Winnipeg, Manitoba, R3P 0P8; Canada; 49°51′24″N 97°13′36″W

Information
- Type: Private Roman Catholic (Jesuit) Non-profit All-male Secondary (grades 9–12) education institution
- Motto: Sicut Miles Christi (" As a Soldier of Christ")
- Religious affiliation: Roman Catholic (Jesuit)
- Established: 1926; 100 years ago
- School district: Manitoba Catholic Schools
- President: Bob Lewin
- Principal: Jeff Laping
- Faculty: 46
- Enrollment: 619
- Student to teacher ratio: 14:1
- Colors: Maroon and White
- Mascot: Captain Cru
- Website: www.stpauls.mb.ca

St. Paul's High School is a Jesuit Roman Catholic all-boys university preparatory high school in Winnipeg, Manitoba. The school has more than 600 students and has an active alumni community numbering more than 12,000.

== History ==
St. Paul's High School was founded in 1926 in a location on Selkirk Avenue. In 1931, the school moved to a larger campus on Ellice Avenue, allowing for dormitory and field space. The college section moved to the University of Manitoba Fort Garry campus in 1958, where it remains to this day. The high school subsequently moved to its current location at 2200 Grant Avenue in 1964.

During the early 1980s, the Jesuit residence was converted into the Monaghan Wing to create additional classroom and teacher preparation space; at the same time, the science laboratories were improved. At the turn of the century, the school responded to the need for more diverse education, and so the Jesuit Legacy Campaign led to the Angus Reid Centre, which includes new classrooms, art, and band rooms, a multimedia lab, a new cafeteria and Crusader locker rooms. By 2007, the burgeoning number of extramural sports teams, fueled by the almost doubled school population from the 1970s, led to the June 2013 opening of the Paul Albrechtsen Multiplex, which holds a state-of-the-art fitness facility, regulation-size basketball court, athletic therapy centre, and a beach volleyball court.

Today, the school has a 14-acre campus, 33,000 square feet of classroom space, and a 1,800-square-foot music and art room.

== Academics ==
St. Paul's High School exceeds the requirements of the Manitoba Provincial High School curriculum. Course offerings include over 60 elective courses. The school also offers Advanced Placement courses and examinations in subjects such as mathematics, language arts, French, and physics.

== Notable alumni ==
- Reg Alcock '66, federal cabinet minister under Paul Martin
- Donovan Alexander '03, Edmonton Eskimos defensive back
- Paul Baxter, NHL and WHA defenceman, NHL assistant coach
- Greg Bryk, actor (A History of Violence, Saw V, Men With Brooms)
- Mark Chipman '78, founder and chairman of True North Sports & Entertainment, Governor of Winnipeg Jets
- Gary Doer '66, former premier of Manitoba and former ambassador to the U.S.
- Chris Driedger '12, professional hockey player for the Manitoba Moose
- John Ferguson Jr., ex-general manager of the Toronto Maple Leafs, MHSAA Darts semi-finalist (1986)
- George R. D. Goulet, best-selling Métis author
- Glenn Joyal '78, chief justice of the Court of King's Bench of Manitoba
- Mark Kingwell, political philosopher, University of Toronto
- Angus Reid, founder of the Angus Reid Group, now known as Ipsos-Reid
- Paul Soubry '80, CEO of NFI Group
- Michael St. Croix '11, former professional hockey player
- Duvie Westcott, former professional hockey player
- Daniel Woolf '76, principal of Queen's University
