= William Egerton Perdue =

The Honourable William Egerton Perdue

Chief Justice of Manitoba
- In office 1918–1929
- Preceded by: Hector Mansfield Howell
- Succeeded by: James Emile Pierre Prendergast

William Egerton Perdue (20 June 1850 – 17 January 1933) was a Canadian lawyer and judge. He was Chief Justice of Manitoba from 1918 to 1929.
