= Hell's Island (1930 film) =

1930 film

- Directed by: Edward Sloman
- Written by: Tom Buckingham; Jo Swerling
- Produced by: Harry Cohn
- Starring: Jack Holt; Ralph Graves; Dorothy Sebastian
- Cinematography: Ted Tetzlaff
- Edited by: Leonard Wheeler
- Production company: Columbia Pictures
- Distributed by: Columbia Pictures
- Release date: July 16, 1930
- Running time: 77 minutes
- Country: United States
- Language: English

Hell's Island is a 1930 American pre-Code drama film directed by Edward Sloman and starring Jack Holt, Ralph Graves and Dorothy Sebastian.

== Plot ==
Two Americans are serving in the French Foreign Legion in North Africa. One of whom is sentenced to serve nine years on Devil's Island.

== Cast ==
- Jack Holt as Mac
- Ralph Graves as Griff
- Dorothy Sebastian as Marie
- Richard Cramer as Sgt. Klotz
- Harry Allen as Bert, the Cockney
- Lionel Belmore as Monsieur Dupont
- Otto Lang as German Legionnaire
- Carl Stockdale as Colonel

== Production ==
The final scenes of Hell's Island were shot on location in Yuma, Arizona.

== Bibliography ==
- Munden, Kenneth White. The American Film Institute Catalog of Motion Pictures Produced in the United States, Part 1. University of California Press, 1997.
