= Colleen Suche =

P. Colleen Suche, KC was appointed a judge of the Manitoba Court of King's Bench on July 17, 2002. She replaced Madam Justice Barbara Hamilton, upon her appointment to the Manitoba Court of Appeal. In 2005, Madam Justice Suche also became a deputy judge of the Nunavut Court of Justice.

Madam Justice Suche received a Bachelor of Laws from the University of Manitoba in 1979 and was admitted to the Bar of Manitoba the following year. Throughout her legal career, practiced a wide range of litigation and served as an arbitrator in labour disputes, an adjudicator under the Canada Labour Code and the Human Rights Code of Manitoba. She was designated King's Counsel in 1990.

Throughout her years in practice, Madam Justice Suche was very active in many community and professional organizations. This included bencher and President of the Law Society of Manitoba, director of the Federation of Law Societies of Canada, The Law Foundation of Manitoba, United Way of Winnipeg, and member of the Research Ethics Committee of the National Research Council of Canada.

Since her appointment to the court, she has served as a director of the Canadian Superior Courts Judges' Association, where she chaired its access to justice committee. She also served as a member of the National Action Committee on Access to Civil and Family Justice, and since 2016 has been a director of the Canadian Institute for the Administration of Justice. While on study leave in 2009, she helped establish the Legal Help Centre of Winnipeg, a free community legal clinic, and remains an advisor on its board of directors.

Madam Justice Suche is a recipient of the University of Winnipeg Distinguished Alumni Award and the Manitoba Bar Association's Isabel Ross MacLean Hunt Award.

In April 2020, Canadian Judicial Council, Canada's court-oversight body, found that Madam Justice Suche was wrong to join her Liberal cabinet-minister husband, Jim Carr, in weighing in on Ottawa's selection of Supreme Court judges.
