= Martin Friedman =

Martin Friedman may refer to:

- Marty Friedman (born 1962), American guitarist
- Marty Friedman (basketball) (1889–1986), American basketball player and coach
- Martin Friedman (museum director) (1925/26–2016), American museum curator

== See also ==
- Martin Freedman, Canadian judge
- Martin Freeman (disambiguation)
