= Prix Riel =

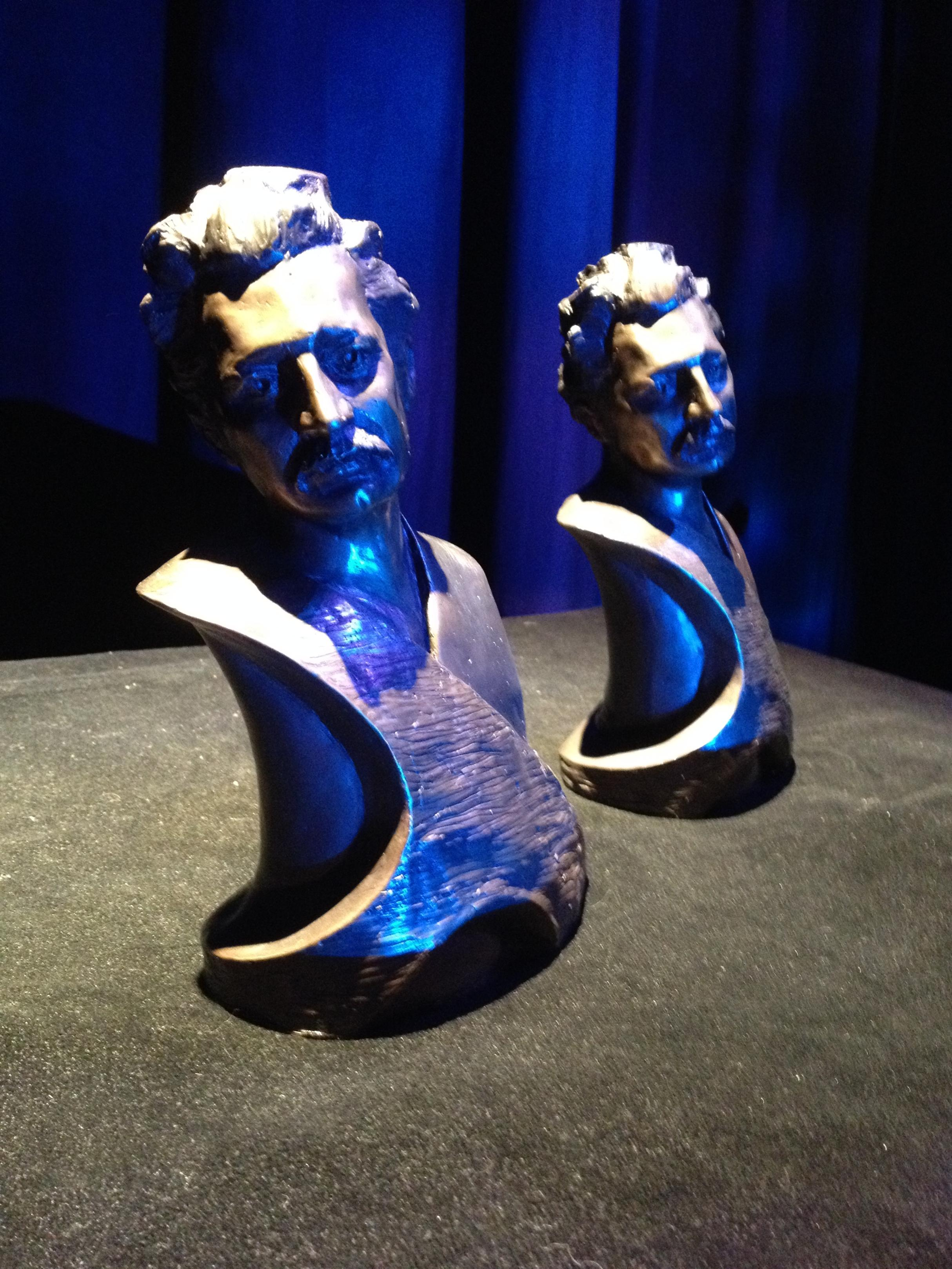
The Prix Riel Statuette

The Prix Riel, created in 1983, recognizes francophones in the Canadian province of Manitoba who, through volunteerism, have made significant contributions to the collective development of the Franco-Manitoban community....

According to the website of the prize's founder, the Société Franco-manitobaine, The prize is awarded to francophones who share the entrepreneurial energy of Louis Riel : these people are dynamic, sincere, and proud of their francophone identity.

== Prize categories ==
The Prix Riel can be awarded for contributions in the following categories:

- Francophone education
- Arts and culture
- Economic development
- Heritage
- Communications
- Law and politics
- Community development
- Sports and leisure
- Health and social sciences

== Notable recipients ==
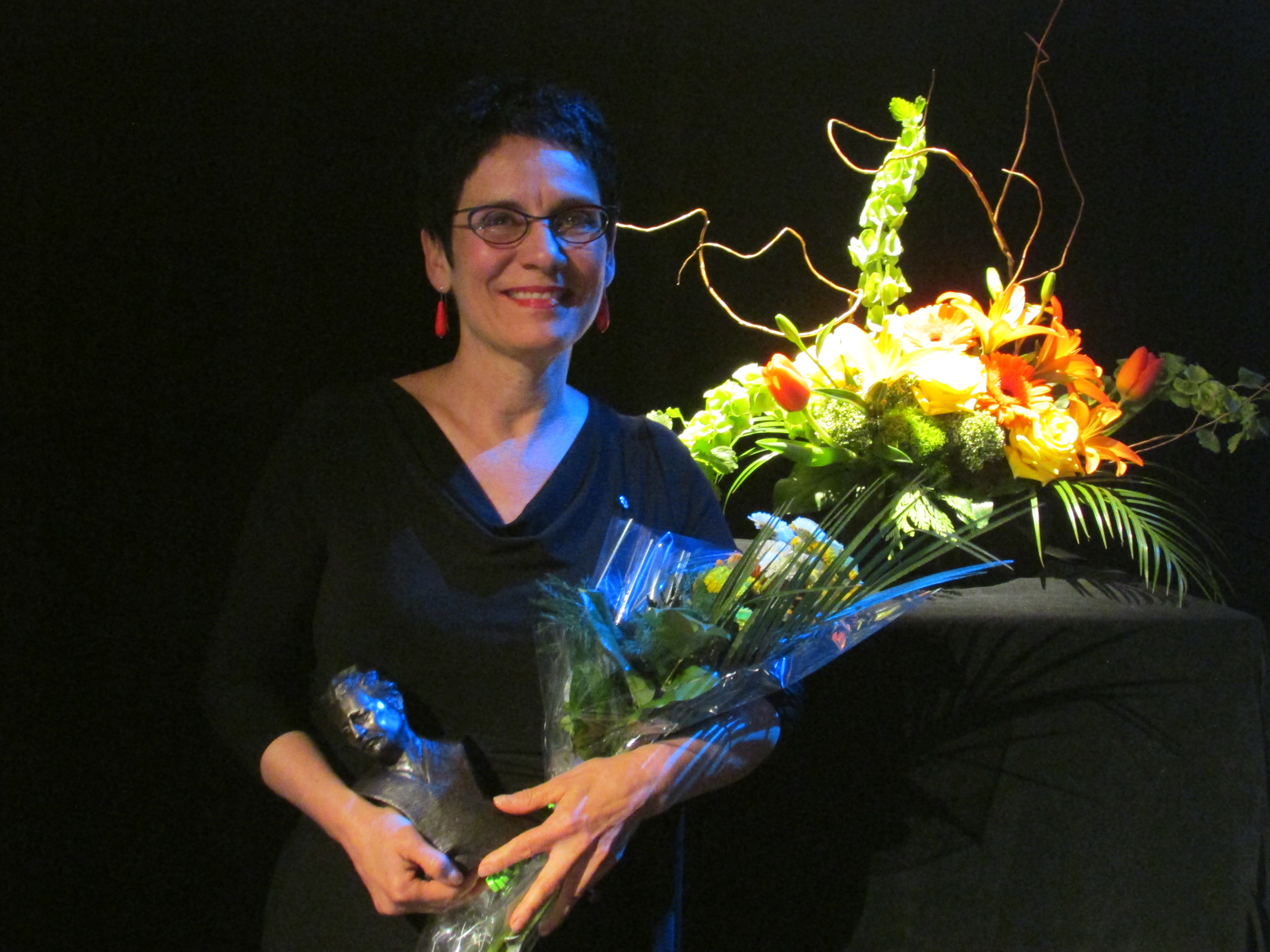
Raymonde Gagné receives the Prix Riel at the 2015 awards gala

- Retired Canadian Senator Maria Chaput in 1998 in the Community development category. (This award was received before being named to the Canadian Senate).
- Internationally renowned architect Étienne Gaboury, CM, OM, in 2000 in the Community development category.
- Politician and former Member of the Legislative Assembly of Manitoba Albert Vielfaure in 2001 in the Community development category.
- Louis Paquin and Charles Lavack of Les Productions Rivard in 2005 in the Communications category.
- Author and educator Annette Saint-Pierre, CM, in 2007 in the Heritage category.
- Former Chief Justice of Manitoba Alfred Monnin, OC, OM, QC in 2010 in the Community development category
- Canadian Senator Raymonde Gagné, CM, OM, in 2015 in the Community development category
