= Samuel Freedman =

Canadian judge (1908–1993)

Samuel Freedman, OC QC (16 April 1908 – 6 March 1993), was a Canadian lawyer and judge, who served as Chief Justice of Manitoba from 1971 to 1983.

== Personal life and education ==
Born on 16 April 1908, to Nathan and Ada (Foxman) Freedman in Zhytomyr, Russian Empire (now Ukraine), Freedman moved to Winnipeg, Manitoba, Canada, when he was three years old. He lived with his family in Winnipeg's north end, attending Aberdeen School and St. John's Technical High School.

In 1934, Freedman married Brownie Udow. The two were parents to Martin Freedman, a former Justice of the Manitoba Court of Appeal whose first judicial appointment was to a position once held by his father.

=== University education and activities ===
Freedman earned a scholarship that allowed him to enter the 5-year arts program at the University of Manitoba in 1924. He earned five scholarships during the course of his university career. With his studies focused on the subjects of Latin and Greek, he planned to pursue his study of the classics had he been awarded the Rhodes Scholarship in 1928. Instead, he pursued his second choice—law—thereby entering the Manitoba Law School in 1929.

At that time, legal education in Manitoba comprised two parts—classes at the law school (which was located in the downtown courthouse) and practical training with practicing lawyers. Freedman completed his practicum with the firm of Steinkopf and Lawrence, a partnership of Winnipeg lawyers Max Steinkopf and W. D. Lawrence.

==== Extra-curriculars ====
During his time at university, Freedman was also involved with the Jewish club on campus, known as the Menorah Society. He also served as editor of the University of Manitoba yearbook, the Brown and Gold, in 1929–1930 (during his first year of law school).

Freedman was also a skilled public speaker and enjoyed participating in debates, which likely helped hone his oratorical skills. He was an active debater at St. John's High School, and continued to debate in university through his involvement with the Debating Union. In November 1930, he participated in the Imperial Debate with Andrew Stewart, Trevor Lloyd and John Mitchell. That year, he also won the McGoun Coup for Manitoba, partnered with W. L. Morton. After graduation, he remained active with the Debating Union, as well as the League of Nations Society.

== Career ==
Freedman received his call to the bar in 1933, then joined Steinkopf & Lawrence in practice, where he became a partner in 1935. In later years, he acknowledged the influence of criminal law practitioners R. A. Bonner and A. J. Andrews and civil litigators Isaac Pitblado, A. E. Hoskin, W. Parker Fillmore, R. D. Guy, and E. K. Williams as being important to his development as a lawyer.

In 1941, Freedman was elected to the executive of the Manitoba Bar Association (MBA), representing the Eastern Judicial District. In 1942, he became the editor of the Manitoba Bar News, a position he held for 4 years.

In 1944, he was appointed King's Counsel. Shortly thereafter, he formed a new law partnership with David Golden. In 1951, Freedman was elected President of the MBA, becoming the first Jewish lawyer in the province to hold the position. In April 1952, Freedman was appointed to the Manitoba Court of Queen's Bench, and as result, dissolved his firm with Golden.

Moreover, Freedman was Chairman of the Rhodes Scholarship Selections Committee from 1956 to 1966.

In March 1960, Freedman was elevated to the Manitoba Court of Appeal. A decade later, in 1971, upon the retirement of Chief Justice Smith, he took over the position of Chief Justice of Manitoba and remained in that position until his retirement at age 75 on 16 April 1983.

In 1964, Freedman was called upon to conduct an inquiry and public hearings into a railway workers' dispute regarding technological changes. The Freedman Commission issued its report in early December 1965.

On 25 June 1984, Freedman was appointed an Officer of the Order of Canada by the Governor General of Canada, Jeanne Sauvé. He has also received numerous honorary degrees.

The following quotation has been attributed to Freedman:

They say that during the first five years every judge delivers his judgment with a lurking suspicion in his mind that he is wrong. During the next five years he delivers every judgment absolutely convinced that he is right. Thereafter he delivers his judgments with a growing indifference as to whether he is right or wrong. And they say that when the indifference becomes habitual, he should retire.

== Philanthropy ==
Freedman served as president of the Young Men's Hebrew Association, and was active with the Winnipeg committee in support of the Hebrew University, and with the B'nai B'rith. He later served as President of the Manitoba chapter of Canadian Friends of the Hebrew University until 1969. In 1978, on his 70th birthday, Freedman was honoured with the establishment of a chair in legal advocacy at the Faculty of Law at the Hebrew University in Jerusalem.

In 1941, Freedman became a part-time lecturer with the Manitoba Law School, teaching civil procedure, agency, partnership and, later, family law. He held this post until his appointment as Chancellor of the university in June 1959, which required him to give up his teaching position. He remained Chancellor of the university until 1968.
