= Morris Kaufman =

Morris Kaufman was appointed judge of the Court of Queen's Bench of Manitoba on October 7, 1998. He replaced the Honourable W.R. DeGraves, who had chosen to become a supernumerary judge.

Justice Kaufman graduated with a degree in law from the University of Manitoba in 1967, and was called to the Bar of Manitoba in 1968. Justice Kaufman first practised law with the firm of Yanofsky & Pollock, and then as a senior attorney with Legal Aid. From 1976 to 1978, he practised in partnership with K. Arenson, and from 1978 to 1987, was a sole practitioner in Winnipeg. He then founded and practised with the firm of Kaufman, Cassidy, Ramsay. He practised mainly civil litigation, aboriginal and criminal law.
