= Douglas Abra =

Canadian judge

Douglas N. Abra KC (born April 1, 1947, in Winnipeg, Manitoba) is a Canadian judge. He was appointed a judge of the Court of King's Bench of Manitoba on July 10, 2007. He replaced Alan D. MacInnes, upon his appointment to the Manitoba Court of Appeal.

Mr. Justice Abra received a Bachelor of Arts in 1968 and a Bachelor of Laws in 1972 from the University of Manitoba. He was admitted to the Bar of Manitoba in 1973. He practised as an associate with Monk Goodwin & Company, then as a Crown Attorney with the provincial Crown (1974–1979) before returning to private practice with Thompson Dorfman Sweatman (1980–1989) and with Hill Abra Dewar (1989–2007). At the time of his appointment to the bench, Mr. Justice Abra was a partner with Hill Abra Dewar.

Prior to his appointment, Mr. Justice Abra practiced in the areas of administrative law, civil litigation, criminal law, insurance and professional liability litigation, regulation of professions and professional discipline, employment law and labour law. Mr. Justice Abra received his King's Counsel designation in 1992. He has also acted as President of the Law Society of Manitoba (1993–1994), as a member of the Court of Queen's Bench Rules Committee, as a frequent lecturer for the Law Society of Manitoba Continuing Legal Education Programs and as chair of the Board of Trustees of Westminster United Church.
