= John Carpay =

Netherlands-born Canadian disbarred lawyer

- Born: The Netherlands
- Citizenship: Canada
- Education: Université Laval; University of Calgary
- Occupations: Lawyer (disbarred); President of the Justice Centre for Constitutional Freedoms

John Carpay is a Canadian disbarred lawyer and newspaper columnist, currently acting as the president of the Justice Centre for Constitutional Freedoms. He has been disbarred by The Law Society of Manitoba and the Law Society of Alberta.

== Early life and education ==
Carpay was born in the Netherlands, before moving to British Columbia, Canada.

He has a bachelor of arts in political science from Université Laval and a Bachelor of Laws from the University of Calgary.

== Career and advocacy ==
He was called to the bar in 1999. He worked in civil litigation with Calgary legal firm Rooney Prentice before working for the Canadian Taxpayers Federation conservative advocacy organization and as the executive director of the Canadian Constitution Foundation.

Carpay is the president of Justice Centre for Constitutional Freedoms, which he founded in 2010. The organisation describes its mission to defend "the constitutional freedoms of Canadians through litigation and education."

Carpay has written columns for The National Post, The Calgary Herald, and Huffington Post.

In 2021, Carpay supported seven churches in their legal bid to fight COVID-19 public health regulations, and during that time, he hired a private investigator to follow Manitoba chief justice Glenn Joyal. Those actions prompted a misconduct complaint from human rights lawyer Richard Warman and critique from University of Alberta's vice dean of law Eric Adams, who described the action as a "tremendous, tremendous lapse of judgment." Carpay took indefinite leave from the JCCF in July 2021, before being reinstated as president in August 2021. Six of the nine members of the board of directors resigned following his reinstatement. An arrest warrant for him was issued by Winnipeg Police in December 2022, prompting Carpay to turn himself in to Calgary Police Service, whereupon he was arrested on December 30 before being released the next day. Carpay was charged with "intimidation of a justice system participant and attempting to obstruct justice." The Law Society of Manitoba announced that it would bring professional misconduct against Carpay at a February 2023 hearing in Winnipeg.

On August 21, 2023, The Law Society of Manitoba barred Carpay from practising law in the province and ordered him to pay $5,000. In his statement Carpay said, "I fully acknowledge that my instructing surveillance of Chief Justice (Glenn) Joyal was in violation of my professional obligations as a lawyer to the court and to society." On September 2, 2025, Carpay was disbarred by the Law Society of Alberta for the same reasons as in Manitoba.

== Politics ==
In 2018, Carpay drew criticism from Jason Kenney for comparing the LGBT flag to a swastika in a discussion on Rebel Media, for which he later apologised.

Carpay ran for the Reform Party in 1993 and the Wildrose Party in 2012. Carpay is a member of the United Conservative Party of Alberta.
