= Frank Aquila =

Canadian judge

Frank Aquila, formerly a judge of the Provincial Court of Manitoba, was appointed a judge of the Family Division of the Manitoba Court of Queen's Bench on February 29, 2000. He replaced Mr. Justice Mullally, who chose to become a supernumerary judge.

Aquila received his Bachelor of Laws from the University of Manitoba in 1982, and was called to the Manitoba Bar in 1983. Prior to his appointment to the Provincial Court of Manitoba in 1994, Aquila was in general practice with the firm of Bueti, Aquila, Baumstark in Winnipeg. He is a former Chair of the Probation Liaison Committee for Manitoba Provincial Judges and of the Committee to Assess Problems in Youth Court. Active as a community volunteer, Aquila is past president of the Winnipeg Lodge of the Order of the Sons of Italy, and he has also been involved with the Italian Folk Dancers Association and the Italian Children's Choir.
