= Freda Steel =

Freda M. Steel was appointed to the Manitoba Court of Queen's Bench on October 5, 1995. She replaced Michel Monnin, upon his appointment to the Manitoba Court of Appeal. On February 29, 2000, she was appointed to the Manitoba Court of Appeal. She replaced Sterling R. Lyon, who had opted to become a supernumerary judge.

Steel received her Bachelor of Laws from the University of Manitoba in 1975 and her master's degree from Harvard Law School in 1978. She was called to the Manitoba Bar in 1976 and to the Ontario Bar in 1980.

From 1975 to 1977, she practised law with Richardson and Company in Winnipeg. From 1978 to 1982, she was an assistant professor of law with the Common Law Section of the University of Ottawa. From 1982 to 1989, she was an associate professor of law at the University of Manitoba, where she served as associate dean of law from 1983 to 1984. From 1989 to 1992, she was director of professional education at the Law Society of Manitoba. From 1992 until her appointment to the bench in 1995, she returned to her role as a professor at the Faculty of Law at the University of Manitoba. Madam Justice Steel has taught family law, clinical family law, ethics and professional responsibility, as well as torts. She also acted as a labour arbitrator. From 1993 until 1995, she acted as counsel to the Office of the Children's Advocate. Steel is the author or co-author of various publications and articles on family law, torts and equality rights. Madam Justice Steel has regularly participated in continuing legal education programs for members of both the Manitoba Bench and Bar.
