= Richard J. F. Chartier =

The Honourable Richard J. F. Chartier CM

Chief Justice of Manitoba
- In office 8 March 2013 – October 2022
- Nominated by: Stephen Harper
- Preceded by: Richard J. Scott
- Succeeded by: Marianne Rivoalen

Puisne Judge of the Manitoba Court of Appeal
- In office 22 November 2006 – 8 March 2013
- Nominated by: Stephen Harper

Judge of the Provincial Court of Manitoba
- In office 16 August 1993 – 22 November 2006

Personal details
- Born: Saint-Boniface, Manitoba
- Education: Université de Saint-Boniface (BA); University of Moncton (LLB)
- Occupation: judge

Richard J. F. Chartier is a Canadian judge and former Chief Justice of Manitoba.

He was appointed a judge of the Manitoba Court of Appeal on November 23, 2006. He replaced A. Kerr Twaddle, who elected to become a supernumerary judge. He was appointed as Chief Justice of Manitoba on March 7, 2013.

Chartier received a Bachelor of Laws in 1982 from the Université de Moncton and Bachelor of Arts in 1979 from Collège Universitaire de Saint-Boniface and was admitted to the Bar of Manitoba in 1983.

Before being appointed to the Provincial Court in 1993, he practised with the firm of Aikins MacAulay Thorvaldson in Winnipeg (from 1986 to 1993). As a lawyer, he developed an expertise in corporate and commercial law, banking law, real estate law, municipal law and tax law. His criminal law and family law expertise developed in the 13 years he served on the Provincial Court.

Since becoming a judge, Chartier has been a member of the Provincial Court Management Committee, Chair of the Rules Committee of the Provincial Court and Chair of the Youth Front-End Administrative Model Subcommittee.

He was made a Member of the Order of Canada on December 31, 2025.
