= Brian Midwinter =

Brian Midwinter was appointed to the Provincial Court of Manitoba on October 20, 2006, and to the Court of Queen's Bench of Manitoba on June 19, 2008.

Justice Midwinter graduated from the University of Manitoba law school in 1977. He articled with Manitoba Justice and while he first practiced law as a Crown attorney in The Pas from 1978 to 1979, most of his 26 years of experience were as a defence attorney in private practice. He was an associate with Carroll, Mullally, Paterson, Brawn from 1979 to 1980, a partner with Sheldon, Singleton, Donald, Midwinter, Brandon from 1980 to 1991, and a partner with Hunt, Miller & Combs from 1991 until 2005. In the fall of 2005, Midwinter joined Legal Aid Manitoba as a supervising attorney at the Northlands Community Law Centre in The Pas.

He served a two-year term as chair of the Legal Aid Liaison Committee and has been very active with the Manitoba Bar Association. He was selected to receive the Canadian Bar Association 2006 President's Award for his contributions to the legal profession and the Association. He received the Queen's Golden Jubilee Medal in January 2003.

Justice Midwinter's involvement in the community has included serving on the board of Brandon Big Brothers Big Sisters and the Brandon United Nations High School seminar. He served as an artillery officer in the Canadian Forces Primary Reserve with the 26th Field Regiment Royal Canadian Artillery from 1973 to 1993, retiring as deputy commanding officer of the regiment with the rank of major.
