= Lieutenant Governor of Manitoba =

Representative of the monarch in the Canadian province of Manitoba

- Emblem of the lieutenant governor of Manitoba

- Flag of the lieutenant governor of Manitoba

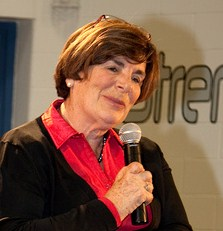
- Incumbent; Anita Neville since 24 October 2022
- Viceroy
- Style: Her Honour the Honourable
- Residence: Government House, Winnipeg
- Appointer: The governor general on the advice of the prime minister
- Term length: At the governor general's pleasure
- Formation: 15 July 1870
- First holder: Sir Adams George Archibald
- Website: www.manitobalg.ca

The lieutenant governor of Manitoba (/lɛfˈtɛnənt/, French: lieutenant-gouverneur (if male) or lieutenante-gouverneure (if female) du Manitoba) is the representative in Manitoba of the monarch, who operates distinctly within the province but is also shared equally with the ten other jurisdictions of Canada. The lieutenant governor of Manitoba is appointed in the same manner as the other provincial viceroys in Canada and is similarly tasked with carrying out most of the monarch's constitutional and ceremonial duties. The present, and 26th, lieutenant governor of Manitoba is Anita Neville, who has served in the role since 24 October 2022.

== Role and presence ==
The lieutenant governor of Manitoba is vested with a number of governmental duties and is also expected to undertake various ceremonial roles. The lieutenant governor, ex officio a member of and the chancellor of the Order of Manitoba, inducts deserving people into the order and, upon installation, automatically becomes a knight or dame of justice and the vice-prior in Manitoba of the Most Venerable Order of the Hospital of Saint John of Jerusalem. The viceroy further presents other provincial honours and decorations, as well as various awards that are named for and presented by the lieutenant governor; these are generally created in partnership with another government or charitable organization and linked specifically to their cause. These honours are presented at official ceremonies, which count amongst hundreds of other engagements the lieutenant governor partakes in each year, either as host or guest of honour; in 2006, the lieutenant governor of Alberta undertook 334 engagements and 284 in 2007.

At these events, the lieutenant governor's presence is marked by the lieutenant governor's standard, consisting of a blue field bearing the escutcheon of the coat of arms of Manitoba surmounted by a crown and surrounded by ten gold maple leaves, symbolizing the ten provinces of Canada. Within Manitoba, the lieutenant governor also follows only the sovereign in the province's order of precedence, preceding even other members of the royal family and the King’s federal representative.

== History ==
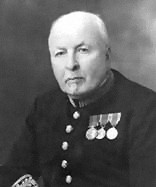
William Johnston Tupper, 12th lieutenant governor of Manitoba, from 1934 to 1940

Standard of the lieutenant governor of Manitoba from 1905 to 1984

Standard of the lieutenant governor of Manitoba from 1870 to 1905

The office of lieutenant governor of Manitoba came into being in 1870, upon Manitoba's entry into Canadian Confederation, and evolved from the earlier position of lieutenant governor of the Northwest Territories, though the occupants continued to simultaneously act as lieutenant governors of the Northwest Territories and later as lieutenant governors of Keewatin District, until the latter was reabsorbed into the Northwest Territories in 1905. Since 1867, 24 lieutenant governors have served the province, amongst whom were notable firsts, such as Pearl McGonigal – the first female lieutenant governor of the province – and Yvon Dumont – the first Métis lieutenant governor. The shortest mandate by a lieutenant governor of Manitoba was Adams George Archibald, from August 1870 to October 1872, while the longest was Roland Fairbairn McWilliams, from 1 November 1940 to 1 August 1953. The first two holders of the title (Adams George Archibald and Alexander Morris) held more power in the province so much so in becoming a de facto Premier and only changed under Joseph-Édouard Cauchon.

In 1919, the Manitoba legislature voted in favour of The Initiative and Referendum Act, which sought to eliminate the lieutenant governor from the legislative process in the province. Royal Assent to the bill was reserved by Lieutenant Governor James Aikins and eventually the Judicial Committee of the Privy Council at Westminster ruled that, since the law affected an appointee of the federal Crown, it was ultra vires and struck down.

Lieutenant Governor George Johnson was called upon to use his reserve powers in March 1988. The governing New Democratic Party (NDP) lost its thin majority in the legislature when one of its Members of the Legislative Assembly, Jim Walding, moved to an opposition party and voted along with the rest of the opposition against the proposed budget, a matter of confidence and supply. Johnson thereafter dissolved the legislature and called an election and the premier, Howard Pawley, announced his resignation both as premier and as leader of the NDP. Pawley felt that he could "hand over the premiership" to whoever succeeded him as party leader. Johnson, however, retained Pawley as premier, waiting until after the provincial election to appoint a successor, so that whoever was by then NDP leader could face and test the confidence of the legislature, should the NDP even win. The NDP failed to win the election, regardless.

== See also ==
- Monarchy in the Canadian provinces
- Government of Manitoba
- Lieutenant governors of Canada
