= John Alton Duncan =

John Alton Duncan (1932–2007) was a Manitoba lawyer and judge.

== Biography ==
He received his call to the Bar on October 1, 1958. He began his legal career practising law in Morden with the firm of Duncan and Duncan, and then later with Duncan Hanssen & Hoeschen. In December 1978, Mr. Duncan was appointed Queen's Counsel. He served as President of the Law Society of Manitoba from 1980 to 1981. In 1991 he was appointed to the Court of Queen's Bench of Manitoba, to serve as a Family Division judge in Brandon. In 1996, he was transferred to the Family Division in Winnipeg, where he continued to serve as a judge until his retirement in 2006. Duncan died on June 5, 2007.
