= Otto Lang =

Canadian politician (born 1932)

The Honourable Otto Lang PC OC KC

Minister of Transport
- In office 26 September 1975 – 3 June 1979
- Prime Minister: Pierre Trudeau
- Preceded by: Jean Marchand
- Succeeded by: Don Mazankowski

Minister of Communications
- Acting; 25 October 1975 – 4 December 1975
- Prime Minister: Pierre Trudeau
- Preceded by: Pierre Juneau
- Succeeded by: Jeanne Sauvé

Minister of Justice Attorney General of Canada
- Acting; 3 August 1978 – 8 August 1978
- Prime Minister: Pierre Trudeau
- Preceded by: Ron Basford
- Succeeded by: Marc Lalonde
- In office 28 January 1972 – 25 September 1975
- Prime Minister: Pierre Trudeau
- Preceded by: John Turner
- Succeeded by: Ron Basford

Minister of Manpower and Immigration
- In office 24 September 1970 – 27 January 1972
- Prime Minister: Pierre Trudeau
- Preceded by: Allan MacEachen
- Succeeded by: Bryce Mackasey

Minister without portfolio
- In office 6 July 1968 – 23 September 1970
- Prime Minister: Pierre Trudeau

Member of Parliament for Saskatoon—Humboldt
- In office 25 June 1968 – 21 May 1979
- Preceded by: Riding created
- Succeeded by: Robert Ogle

Personal details
- Born: Otto Emil Lang; 14 May 1932 (age 94) Handel, Saskatchewan, Canada
- Party: Liberal
- Spouse(s): Adrian Merchant (m. 1963; div. 1988) Deborah McCawley (m. 1989)
- Children: 7, including Amanda, Timothy
- Education: University of Saskatchewan (BA, LLB); Exeter College, Oxford (BCL); University of Manitoba (LLD)
- Profession: Lawyer; dean

see also Otto Lang (film producer) and Otto Lang (actor)

Otto Emil Lang PC OC KC (born 14 May 1932) is a Canadian lawyer and former politician.

== Life and career ==
Lang was born in Handel, Saskatchewan. In 1961, he was appointed Dean of Law at the University of Saskatchewan, the youngest person to be appointed to that position, and served until 1969.

Lang was elected to the House of Commons of Canada in the 1968 election, and was re-elected in the 1972 and 1974 elections as the Member of Parliament for Saskatoon—Humboldt. He served as Minister without Portfolio (1968–70), Minister responsible for the Canadian Wheat Board (1969–79), Acting Minister of Mines, Energy and Resources (1969), Minister of Manpower and Immigration (1970–72), Minister of Justice and Attorney General (1972–75), Minister of Transport (1975–79), Acting Minister of Communications (1975), Acting Minister of Justice and Attorney General (1978), and Minister of Justice and Attorney General (1978). His riding was abolished ahead of the 1979 federal election, and when he ran in the successor constituency of Saskatoon East, he lost to Robert Ogle of the New Democratic Party.

Following his career in politics, Lang served as the Executive Vice-president of Pioneer Grain Co. Ltd., Chairman of the Transport Institute at the University of Manitoba and as president, CEO of Centra Gas Manitoba Inc. He is currently retired, but serves as a director of several companies, including Investor's Group and the Winnipeg Airport Authority. In 2005-06 Lang served as the co-chair of the federal Liberal election campaign for Manitoba. He also took part in international activities as the Honorary Consul-General of Japan.

A Rhodes Scholar, Lang holds a B.A. and an LL.B. from the University of Saskatchewan, a B.C.L from Oxford University (Exeter College) and an LL.D. from the University of Manitoba. He played for the Oxford University Ice Hockey Club, winning two Blues.

In 1999, he was made an Officer of the Order of Canada.

== Family ==
Lang is married to Madam Justice Deborah McCawley of the Court of King's Bench of Manitoba. They currently reside in Manitoba. He was previously married to Adrian Merchant, the daughter of Sally Merchant.

Lang is the father of seven children: Maria Lang (d. 1991); Andrew Lang, a communications advisor who was the federal Liberal candidate for the riding of Toronto—Danforth in 2008 and 2011; Timothy Lang, President and CEO of Youth Employment Services (Canada) in Toronto; Gregory Lang, a consultant; Elisabeth Lang, Superintendent of Bankruptcy at the Office of the Superintendent of Bankruptcy; Adrian Lang, a lawyer and senior executive at Staples Canada in Toronto (she was formerly a partner with the law firm of Stikeman Elliott); and Amanda Lang, a television news personality, best selling author and currently chief financial correspondent for CTV News. She has hosted the weekly show Taking Stock on BNN Bloomberg since 2022.

== Election results ==
Federal Riding of Saskatoon East

1979 Canadian federal election
Party	Candidate	Votes
New Democratic	OGLE, Bob	15,234
Progressive Conservative	MEYERS, Dan	13,256
Liberal	LANG, Otto	12,631
Social Credit	HOLTORF, Gary	117
Marxist–Leninist	NEUFELD, Eric	64

Federal Riding of Saskatoon Humboldt

1974 Canadian federal election
Party	Candidate	Votes
Liberal	LANG, Otto	23,243
New Democratic	FRIESEN, Julius	11,826
Progressive Conservative	RHEAUME, Gene	11,592
Social Credit	HOLTORF, Garry	548

1972 Canadian federal election
Party	Candidate	Votes
Liberal	LANG, Otto	24,733
New Democratic	TAYLOR, George	16,426
Progressive Conservative	BRAND, Lewis	12,533
Social Credit	BLACK, Gerald G.	463
Not affiliated	REID, James	102
Not affiliated	ZAMULINSKI, Brian	89

1968 Canadian federal election
Party	Candidate	Votes
Liberal	LANG, Otto	15,210
New Democratic	TAYLOR, George	14,655
Progressive Conservative	BRAND, Lewis	14,444

== Archives ==
There is an Otto E. Lang fonds at Library and Archives Canada.

Political offices
Preceded by Allan MacEachen	Minister of Manpower and Immigration; 1970–1972	Succeeded by Bryce Mackasey
Preceded by John Turner	Minister of Justice; 1972–1975	Succeeded by Ron Basford
Preceded by Jean Marchand	Minister of Transport; 1975–1979	Succeeded by Don Mazankowski
Preceded by Pierre Juneau	Minister of Communications; 1975	Succeeded by Jeanne Sauvé
Preceded by Ron Basford	Minister of Justice; 1978	Succeeded by Marc Lalonde
