= Alan MacInnes =

Alan D. MacInnes, formerly a judge of the Court of Queen's Bench of Manitoba, was appointed to the Manitoba Court of Appeal on June 22, 2007. He replaced Glenn Joyal, who was appointed a judge of the Court of Queen's Bench.

MacInnes received his Bachelor of Laws degree from the University of Manitoba in 1966, in which year he was also admitted to the Manitoba Bar. He practised with the firm of Thompson Dorfman Sweatman in the field of civil litigation and developed an expertise in both criminal and civil litigation. In 1978, he was appointed a part-time judge of the Provincial Court of Manitoba, working in the Criminal Division. In 1992, he was appointed to the Court of Queen's Bench of Manitoba as a full-time superior court judge.

MacInnes has heard cases and written decisions arising out of civil and criminal law trials. He has also served as the Secretary of the Canadian Superior Courts Judges Association. Before his appointment to the Bench, he was a frequent speaker, lecturer and prominent member of the Law Society of Manitoba, the Federation of Law Societies of Canada and several charitable foundations in Winnipeg.
