= Catherine Everett (painter) =

Canadian abstract painter

Catherine Everett (born 1957) is a Canadian abstract painter.

== Early life ==
Catherine Everett was born and raised in Montreal. She received her Bachelor's degree in visual arts from Concordia University in 1980 and in 1988 she went on to receive her Master's of Fine Arts from the same university.

== Art ==
Catherine Everett works in sculpture, painting and drawing. Her work is described as a material exploration and the visual depiction of an interior and mysterious world. Her work is compared to that of Willem de Kooning, Jean-Paul Riopelle and Anselm Kiefer. Everett describes her work as, "the desire to give substance to things in the world that are not visible – the internal, the emotional, the spiritual –a way of attempting to assign to these concerns a more specific place in a world that seems to have already too much weight, gravity, density".

== Career highlights ==
From 1985 to 1996 Everett showed with the Montreal gallery Rene Blouin and since 2004 she shows with the Montreal gallery Han Art. Everett received attention early in her career and was described by one reviewer as, "one of the most rigorous and talented local artists of her generation". Her work has shown with other prominent Montreal artists like Betty Goodwin, Peter Krausz and Guido Molinari. Everett's work has shown in Ottawa, Montreal, Prince Edward Island, Mexico and Quebec City.

== Public shows and collections ==
- Musee d'art de Joliette
- Museo de Arte Contemporaneo de Monterrey
- Robert McLaughlin Gallery
- Musée national des beaux-arts du Québec
