= Marianne Rivoalen =

Canadian judge

The Honourable Marianne Rivoalen OC OM

Chief Justice of Manitoba
- Incumbent
- Assumed office June 1, 2023
- Nominated by: Justin Trudeau
- Preceded by: Richard J. F. Chartier

Justice of the Federal Court of Appeal
- In office September 20, 2018 – June 1, 2023

Personal details
- Education: Université de Saint-Boniface (BA); Université de Moncton (LLB)
- Profession: Judge

Marianne Rivoalen is the Chief Justice of Manitoba. She was appointed on June 1, 2023. She is the first woman to head the Manitoba judiciary.

She was first appointed a judge of the Family Division of the Court of Queen's Bench of Manitoba on February 2, 2005. On May 22, 2015, Rivaolen took over as Associate Chief Justice of the Family Division of the Court of Queen's Bench of Manitoba.

Between 2018 and 2023, she was a Justice of the Federal Court of Appeal in Ottawa. She was appointed Chief Justice of Manitoba on June 1, 2023, and sits on the Court of Appeal.

== Early life ==
Rivaolen was born into a Franco-Manitoban community and was raised in a family farm in St Labre, Manitoba. She received her undergraduate degree in mathematics from Université de Saint-Boniface and a Bachelor of Laws from the University of Moncton Law School in 1988.

== Career ==
Rivoalen was admitted to the Manitoba Bar in 1989 and worked in private practice in Winnipeg until 2003, practicing primarily in family and civil law. She then went on to work for the Federal Department of Justice's regional office in Winnipeg where she was senior counsel for the Aboriginal Law Services Group and the Indian residential schools litigation team. She represented clients in both French and English.

During this time she also extensively volunteered with various community organizations such as the Law Society of Manitoba and the Women's Legal Education and Action Fund."

She was appointed to the family division of Court of Queen's Bench of Manitoba on February 2, 2005 and was elevated to Associate Chief Justice in 2015.

Rivoalen was appointed to the Federal Court of Appeal in 2018."

In June 2023, Prime Minister Justin Trudeau announced her appointment as the Chief Justice of Manitoba. He remarked "“I wish the Honourable Marianne Rivoalen every success as she takes on her new role as Chief Justice of Manitoba. She is a respected member of the legal community and brings a wealth of legal experience. I am confident Chief Justice Rivoalen will be a great asset to the people of Manitoba."
