= Donald Bryk =

Canadian judge

Donald P. Bryk, QC, was appointed a judge of the Court of Queen's Bench of Manitoba in Dauphin on February 17, 1999. He replaced Mr. Justice Kenneth J. Galanchuck, who resigned.

Mr. Justice Bryk graduated in law from the University of Manitoba in 1969 and was called to the Bar of Manitoba in 1970. Mr. Justice Bryk then joined the firm known today as Myers Weinberg, with which he had been a partner since 1977. During his time in practice, he undertook primarily civil litigation, real estate and wills and estate law matters.
