= Brenda Keyser =

Brenda L. Keyser was appointed a judge of the Court of King's Bench of Manitoba on October 5, 1995. She replaced A. A. Hirschfield, who had chosen to become a supernumerary judge.

Keyser graduated in law from the University of Manitoba in 1978, and was called to the Manitoba Bar in 1979. From 1978 to 1986, she practised mainly criminal, labour and civil litigation with the firm Pollock and Company. After practising exclusively criminal law with the firm Gindin, Soronow, she became a founding partner, in 1987, of the firm Keyser, Baragar, Harris & Sadana, later known as Keyser, Harris.

Keyser practised mainly criminal law, but was also involved in child welfare and aboriginal law cases. She became a Bencher of the Law Society of Manitoba in 1994. She is bilingual.
