= R v Lavallee =

- Supreme Court of Canada

Hearing: October 31, 1989 Judgment: May 3, 1990
- Full case name: Angelique Lyn Lavallee v Her Majesty The Queen
- Citations: [1990] 1 S.C.R. 852
- Docket No.: 21022
- Prior history: On appeal from Court of Appeal for Manitoba
- Ruling: Lavallee appeal allowed

Court membership
- Chief Justice: Brian Dickson; Puisne Justices: Antonio Lamer, Bertha Wilson, Gérard La Forest, Claire L'Heureux-Dubé, John Sopinka, Charles Gonthier, Peter Cory, Beverley McLachlin

Reasons given
- Majority: Wilson, joined by Dickson, Lamer, L'Heureux-Dubé, Gonthier and McLachlin
- Concurrence: Sopinka
- La Forest and Cory took no part in the consideration or decision of the case.

R v Lavallee, [1990] 1 S.C.R. 852 is a leading Supreme Court of Canada case on the legal recognition of battered woman syndrome. The judgment, written by Justice Bertha Wilson, is generally considered one of her most famous. The court held in favour of allowing battered woman syndrome to explain how the mental conditions for self-defence were present in this case, and Lavallee's acquittal was restored.

== Background ==
Angelique Lynn Lavallee was in an abusive common law relationship with Kevin Rust. In the early morning hours of 31 August 1986, during a particularly serious fight Rust threatened to harm her, saying "either you kill me or I'll get you" per her statement to the police. During the altercation Rust slapped her, pushed her and hit her twice on the head. At some point during the altercation he handed Lavallee a gun, which she first fired through a window screen. Lavallee first contemplated shooting herself; however when Rust turned around to leave the room she shot him in the back of the head. At trial, Lavallee argued self-defence, and had a psychiatrist testify in her support. He explained the effects of her circumstances on her mental state and that in the state she was in she felt she was going to be killed and had no alternative but to shoot him. Lavallee did not testify. The jury acquitted Lavallee.

On appeal by the Crown, the verdict was overturned by the Supreme Court of Manitoba in 1988, and a new trial was ordered. The court ruled that the psychiatrist had given inadmissible testimony regarding past abuse that were unsubstantiated by hospital visits or police statements, and that the judge in that case had not properly instructed the jury regarding this.

Lavallee appealed the decision by the Manitoba Supreme Court, and the Supreme Court of Canada upheld the original acquittal on 5 May 1990 in a unanimous decision.

== Reasons of the court ==
At issue before the Supreme Court was whether the expert evidence on battered woman syndrome was admissible.

Justice Bertha Wilson, writing for the court, held that expert evidence is often needed when stereotypes and stigmatisation are inherent in a person's reasoning. In particular here, the woman's experience and perspective is relevant to the reasonable person's standard required for self-defence. Additionally, the justice wrote that sufficient evidence was given for the jury to have potentially reached the same conclusion without the psychiatrist's testimony.

Justice John Sopinka added in a concurring opinion that, had there been no evidence supporting the psychiatrist's testimony, it would have been reasonable to discount it. However, sufficient evidence was given to support his expert's statements, and the jury was therefore entitled to rely on his testimony.

== Legacy ==
In 2012, Canadian parliament passed reforms to Section 34 of the criminal code to include consideration of "the extent to which the use of force was imminent" (section 34[2][b]) and "the nature, duration and history of any relationship between the parties to the incident, including any prior use or threat of force and the nature of that force or threat" (section 34[2][f]) in assessment of self-defence claims, codifying a portion of Justice Wilson's opinion in Lavallee.

The Lavallee decision has also been applied to criminal sentencing for women who experienced abuse. in R v Naslund, the Alberta Court of Appeal ruled that a woman who pled guilty to killing her husband after years of abuse had received too high a sentence. Justice Sheila Greckol cited Lavallee in her majority opinion, stating that it is “beyond time for this Court to explicitly recognize that cases of battered women killing abusive partners involve unique circumstances that must be considered by the sentencing judge”.

== See also ==
- Angelina Napolitano
- Battered husband syndrome
- Complex PTSD
