= Joan McKelvey =

Joan G. McKelvey was appointed a judge of the Manitoba Court of King's Bench on September 28, 2001. She replaced the Honourable Mr. Justice S.I. Schwartz, who elected to become a supernumerary judge.

Madam Justice McKelvey received a Bachelor of Laws from the University of Manitoba in 1978 and was admitted to the Bar of Manitoba the following year. Prior to her appointment, Madam Justice McKelvey was the Senior Solicitor with the Manitoba Public Insurance Corporation.

Throughout her career with MPIC, Madam Justice McKelvey acquired extensive expertise in all aspects of personal injury litigation and alternate dispute resolution. She appeared before both the trial and appellate courts in Manitoba as well as administrative tribunals. Madam Justice McKelvey has been a presenter for various professional seminars and for the Bar Admission Course of the Law Society of Manitoba.
