= Marilyn Goldberg =

Marilyn E. Goldberg, QC, was appointed a judge of the Family Division of the Manitoba Court of Queen's Bench on July 17, 2002. She replaced Mr. Justice J.A. Duncan, who elected to become a supernumerary judge.

Madam Justice Goldberg received a Bachelor of Laws from the University of Manitoba in 1972 and was admitted to the Bar of Manitoba the following year. She was appointed a Master of the Manitoba Court of Queen's Bench in Winnipeg in 1984 where, at the time of her appointment, she was Senior Master of that court. In that position, Madam Justice Goldberg was responsible for cases involving family law, including business and property valuation, bankruptcy matters, civil procedure and rules of court as well as estates and trust matters. Over the years, she has been a frequent presenter at various continuing legal education and bar admission programs. Madam Justice Goldberg was appointed Queen's Counsel in 1984.
