= Miel amarga =

Song by Irma Serrano

from the album Mexican Fire
- Language: Spanish
- English title: "Bitter Honey"
- Released: 1966
- Genre: Ranchera
- Length: 2:51
- Label: CBS

"Miel amarga" (English: "Bitter Honey") is a ranchera song by Mexican recording artist Irma Serrano, from her sixth studio album, Mexican Fire (1966).

== Charts ==
Chart (1966)	Peak position
Mexico (Audiomusica)	5
