= Michel Monnin =

Michel A. Monnin was appointed a judge of the Manitoba Court of Appeal on July 27, 1995. His appointment became effective on August 3, 1995. He replaced Alan R. Philp, who chose to become a supernumerary judge.

Monnin graduated from the University of Manitoba Law School in 1969, and was called to the Manitoba Bar in 1970. From 1972 until 1984, he practised law with the Winnipeg law firm of Teffaine, Monnin, Hogue, Teillet & Sharp. In 1984, Monnin was appointed to the Manitoba Court of Queen's Bench in Winnipeg.

His father, Alfred Monnin, and his brother, Marc Monnin, also served as members of the Manitoba Court of Appeal.
