= Thompson Dorfman Sweatman =

Thompson Dorfman Sweatman LLP
- Headquarters: 242 Hargrave Street; True North Square; Winnipeg, Manitoba, Canada
- No. of offices: 10
- No. of attorneys: 115
- Major practice areas: Corporate/Commercial, Litigation, Labour & Employment
- Key people: Keith LaBossiere (CEO, Managing Partner), Zach Zahradnik (COO), Bjorn Christianson (Managing Partner, Portage la Prairie), Paul Roy (Managing Partner, Brandon), James A. Ripley (Counsel to the Firm).
- Date founded: 1887; 139 years ago in Winnipeg
- Company type: Limited liability partnership
- Website: www.tdslaw.com

Thompson Dorfman Sweatman LLP (TDS) is a Canadian, Manitoba-based law firm with its head office in Winnipeg. The firm has three full-time regional offices in Brandon, Portage la Prairie, and Pembina Valley. Along with six part-time satellite offices in Boissevain, Gladstone, MacGregor, Neepawa, Saskatoon, and Steinbach.

On 27 May 2010, Thompson Dorfman Sweatman announced a merger with the firm Perlov Stewart LLP, which became effective June 1 that year. Both firms continued under the name Thompson Dorfman Sweatman LLP. On 14 January 2013, the firm announced a merger with the Portage la Prairie firm Christianson Law. On 7 January 2014, the firm announced another merger with the Brandon firm Roy Johnston & Co.

TDS has lawyers who provide services to its clients in both Official Languages of Canada and also in Amharic (spoken), Cantonese, German, Hebrew, Italian, Mandarin, Persian, Portuguese and Tagalog. TDS was one of the founding members of Lex Mundi, an association of independent law firms and continue to be its only Manitoba-based firm.

== Affiliated companies ==
On 27 May 2009 Thompson Dorfman Sweatman LLP announced the launch of Acumen Corporate Development Inc., an affiliate of the firm. Acumen focused on providing North American companies with a structured, comprehensive approach to the planning and execution of growth by acquisition, financing and other strategic opportunities.

On 27 May 2010, TDS announced a merger with the firm Perlov Stewart LLP, which became effective June 1 that year. Both firms continued under the name Thompson Dorfman Sweatman LLP. On 14 January 2013, the firm announced a merger with the Portage la Prairie firm Christianson Law. On 7 January 2014, the firm announced another merger with the Brandon firm Roy Johnston & Co.

TDS was one of the founding members of Lex Mundi, an association of independent law firms and continue to be its only Manitoba-based firm.

== Awards ==
The firm has received awards and distinctions from third party organizations including Chambers Global, Lexpert, Best Lawyers, Benchmark Litigation, and Canadian Lawyer Magazine, which rated them one of the top corporate law firms in Manitoba.

== Notable firm alumni ==
- Andrew Swan
- Alan MacInnes
- Douglas Abra
- Gord Mackintosh
- Karen Simonsen
- Lori Douglas
- Nathan Nurgitz
