= Karen Simonsen =

Karen I. Simonsen was appointed a judge of the Court of Queen's Bench of Manitoba on December 10, 2004. She replaced Mr. Justice Marc Monnin, who was appointed Chief Justice.

Madam Justice Simonsen received a Bachelor of Laws from the University of Manitoba in 1981. She was admitted to the Manitoba Bar in 1982.

At the time of her appointment, she was a partner with the firm of Thompson Dorfman Sweatman in Winnipeg. She practised primarily in civil litigation with an emphasis on personal injury, insurance and workers' compensation matters.
