= Shawn Greenberg =

Shawn Deborah Greenberg was appointed a judge of the Manitoba Court of King's Bench on October 30, 2003. She replaced Mr. Justice T.M. Glowacki, who elected to become a supernumerary judge.

Madam Justice Greenberg received a Bachelor of Laws from the University of Manitoba in 1975, and was admitted to the Manitoba Bar in 1976. At the time of her appointment, she was Crown counsel with the constitutional law branch of the Manitoba Department of Justice. Prior to joining the Department, she had been in private practice with McCaffrey & Co. in Winnipeg.

Throughout her career, Madam Justice Greenberg has been involved in judicial education with the National Judicial Institute. She has also been an instructor at the University of Manitoba's Faculty of Law, as well as at the Manitoba Bar Admission Course. She was a member of the board of directors of the Canadian Institute for the Administration of Justice and is the author and co-author of several legal publications.
