= Lori Douglas =

Canadian judge

A. Lori Douglas

Justice of the Court of Queen's Bench of Manitoba (Family Division)
- In office May 19, 2005 – March 21, 2015

A. Lori Douglas was the Associate Chief Justice of the Court of Queen's Bench of Manitoba (Family Division). She currently lectures and practices family law part-time.

== Education ==
Douglas received a Bachelor of Arts from the University of Winnipeg in 1978 and a Bachelor of Laws from the University of Manitoba in 1982. She was admitted to the Law Society of Manitoba in 1982.

== Legal career ==
Douglas was a partner with the firm of Thompson Dorfman Sweatman, where she practised primarily family law. She was a professor at the Faculty of Law at the University of Manitoba and at the Bar Admission Course.

== Judicial career ==
On May 19, 2005, Douglas was appointed a Judge of the Court of Queen's Bench (Family Division). On May 14, 2009, she was appointed Associate Chief Justice of the Court of Queen's Bench (Family Division), replacing Justice Gerry Mercier.

=== Complaint and resignation ===
In July 2010, Winnipeg resident Alexander Chapman filed a formal complaint with the Canadian Judicial Council against Lori Douglas and her husband, Jack King. The complaint alleged that King, a lawyer for the Thompson Dorfman Sweatman firm, uploaded nude photographs of his wife to a pornography site in 2003 in order to tease clients such as Chapman. In doing so Chapman broke a confidentiality agreement made with King in 2003. A 2016 interview, which described the photographs as revenge porn, alleged that his motive was to humiliate a judge in another case who was a colleague of Douglas. Douglas, who learned about the photos and forgave King in 2003, was unaware that there were surviving copies. In 2016, Douglas said "I’ve actually never seen the images and I don’t ever want to see them."

The subsequent investigation drew support from the civil law dean at the University of Ottawa who said "If pictures of you naked end up on an Internet site, it's quite difficult to say you have the credibility to be a judge." However, an article in Canadian Lawyer Magazine was critical of the move, calling it "victim blaming couched as legitimate judicial inquiry".

In September 2010, Douglas asked to be "temporarily relieved of her duties as a sitting justice" while "remain[ing] in her position in an administrative capacity". On January 5, 2011, the Canadian Judicial Council determined that the matter of the complaints against Douglas merited further investigation and referred to a review panel. The Canadian Judicial Council inquiry suffered from a series of delays and legal challenges before finally concluding on 24 November 2014, when Douglas agreed to early retirement in return for the case being officially stayed. Douglas officially retired on 21 March 2015.
