= Taras Sokolyk =

Taras Sokolyk was a former political organizer. He played a prominent role in the Progressive Conservative Party of Manitoba's 1995 election campaign, in which the party won a majority government.

Once a political organizer in Manitoba, Canada, he served as chief of staff to Progressive Conservative premier Gary Filmon in the 1990s. Sokolyk resigned his post in July 1998 after he was accused of helping to rig the 1995 Provincial Election. In November 1998 Sokolyk admitted that he had improperly used campaign funds in an attempt to split the vote to improve his party's chance of victory. After this admission Filmon claimed that he hadn't known about Sokolyk's actions and blamed him and aide Julian Benson for the vote-rigging scandal.

The Manitoba government refused to pay Sokolyk's legal fees arising from the case and Sokolyk was ultimately not criminally charged in the case. In December 2002 the Progressive Conservatives again hired Sokolyk as a campaign consultant entrusted with research and advising about campaign strategy but fired him less than a month later.

By 2004 Sokolyk was working for hotel chain Canad Inns. By 2008 he had become CEO of the company.

He died on Saturday, August 20, 2022, at the age of 69, after years of battling cancer.
