= Deborah McCawley =

Deborah J. McCawley KC is a judge of the Court of King's Bench of Manitoba. She was appointed the position on September 17, 1997 when she replaced Gerald O. Jewers, who had chosen to become a supernumerary judge.

Prior to her appointment to the bench, McCawley had been the chief executive officer of the Law Society of Manitoba since 1988. She graduated in law from Osgoode Hall Law School in 1975, and was called to the Manitoba Bar in 1976. She practised civil litigation and family law in Winnipeg until 1980, when she became deputy chief executive officer of the Law Society of Manitoba. From 1985 to 1988, she was a sessional lecturer at the Faculty of Law at the University of Manitoba, on the topic of ethics and professional responsibility. She has also served as president of Lawyers' Excess Liability Insurance (Manitoba) Ltd., and was a member of the Canadian Lawyers Insurance Association Advisory Board and its Claims Administration Committee.

McCawley is married to Otto Lang.
