= Stanley Goldberg =

American judge (born 1939)

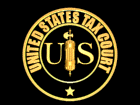

Stanley J. Goldberg (born Maryland, 1939) is a special trial judge of the United States Tax Court.

Goldberg attended public schools in Baltimore, MD. He earned a B.S. from the University of Maryland, School of Business and Public Administration in 1960 and an LL.B. from the University of Maryland School of Law in 1964. He did graduate work in Federal Income Taxation at New York University. Goldberg was admitted to practice in Maryland and New Jersey, 1964 and 1967, and Federal District Court. He began his career as a Tax Attorney in January 1965 with the United States Department of Treasury, Office of Chief Counsel, Internal Revenue Service, in New York City and was initially assigned to the General Litigation function. In 1967, he was reassigned to the Tax Litigation function. In 1976, he was promoted to Special Trial Attorney, and then to Assistant District Counsel in 1984.

As of 1985, he was Assistant Commissioner for Returns and Information Processing.

He was appointed a Special Trial Judge of the United States Tax Court on August 4, 1985.

In 1992, Goldberg commented on the trend of tax protester arguments being brought before the Tax Court and dismissed with penalties.

== Attribution ==
Material on this page was copied from the website of the United States Tax Court, which is published by a United States government agency, and is therefore in the public domain.
