= Laurie Allen (judge) =

Canadian judge

Laurie Patricia Allen, QC was appointed a judge of the Family Division of the Manitoba Court of Queen's Bench on October 7, 1998. She replaced Mr. Justice John A. Menzies who was appointed to the court's General Division.

Allen graduated in law from the University of Manitoba in 1975 and was called to the Bar of Manitoba in 1976. She first practised law with the firm of McCaffrey, Akman, Carr, Starr and Prober. She had a general practice in Winnipeg as a sole practitioner from 1981 to 1985 and then joined the firm of Cherniack, Allen, in which she was a partner. Madam Justice Allen practised civil litigation, family law, child protection law, real estate and estate law.

Allen served as President of the Law Society of Manitoba and has been a Bencher since 1990 and Chair of the Legal Education and Action Fund Endowment Fund Campaign. From 1985 to 1988, she was a Member and Chairperson of the Manitoba Police Commission. Allen "elected to become a supernumerary judge as of April 13, 2015".
