= Bitter Honey (2014 film) =

- Film poster
- Directed by: Robert Lemelson
- Produced by: Robert Lemelson; Alessandra Pasquino
- Cinematography: Wing Ko
- Edited by: Chisako Yokoyama
- Music by: Malcolm Cross
- Production company: Elemental Productions
- Release date: October 3, 2014 (United States)
- Running time: 82 minutes
- Country: United States
- Languages: Indonesian; Balinese; English

Bitter Honey is a 2014 documentary film directed by anthropologist and filmmaker Robert Lemelson that chronicles the lives of three polygamous families living in Bali, Indonesia. The film follows the wives from their introduction to the polygamous lifestyle to the emotional hardships and jealousies to their struggle for empowerment and equal rights.

== Production ==
Bitter Honey was directed by Robert Lemelson, an anthropologist and filmmaker with a doctorate from UCLA. Lemelson had originally been researching the 1998 mass rapes perpetrated during the economic crisis and the fall of the Suharto regime. Realizing that these acts were only one piece of the larger puzzle of gender inequality in Indonesia, Lemelson shifted his focus to domestic violence and particularly how it coincided with polygamous kinship forms. The film's title refers to a regional play on words, as the local term for co-wife (madu) also translates to "honey".

The film was shot over a period of seven years. Lemelson used this longitudinal approach to gain the trust of his subjects, saying, "We returned over and over so that people could see we weren't just there to get data and never return."

The film is presented in thematic chapters, with each new section introduced by a traditional Wayang Kulit shadow-puppet performance about the issues surrounding polygamous unions. The filmmakers commissioned this performance for use in the film. In earlier cuts of "Bitter Honey", the film had focused on the husbands in these polygamous arrangements, but Lemelson quickly realized that the more compelling story arose from examining how these marriages are experienced by the co-wives.

== Synopsis ==
The film follows the lives of three polygamous families living in Bali, Indonesia, where polygynous unions make up about 10% of households.

The first is the family of Sadra, a fair trade craftsman with two wives and eight children living in separate compounds. Sadra's main narrative thread concerns generational cycles of violence and his abusive relationship with his first wife and mother, and its effect on his children. At one point in the narrative, Sadra's first wife requests the help of his boss and a local human rights lawyer to stage an intervention confronting Sadra about his abusive behavior.

The second family is that of local thug and cockfight organizer, Darma. His five wives each describe how they were "tricked or badgered" into accepting a polygamous marriage and their efforts to come to terms with it. Darma frequently seeks sexual relationships outside of his marital bonds, including with sex workers—putting himself and his wives at risk of STD infection.

The third family profiled is that of Sang Putu Tuaji, a powerful elderly man who was the leader of a local anti-communist militia. He had ten wives, five still living at the time of the film.

== Release ==
The film opened in limited theatrical release in the United States on October 3, 2014.

== Critical response ==
Reviews were generally positive. On Rotten Tomatoes it has a 67% approval rating based on 9 reviews, and an average rating of 5.8 out of 10. On Metacritic, the film has a weighted average score of 62 out of 100, based on 6 reviews, indicating "generally favorable" reviews.

Reviewers praising the film for its objective illumination of cultural issues in relation to gender status in Indonesia. Many reviewers praised the film for its potential as an educational tool within Bali as well as in Western classrooms. Critics of the film believed it to be too narrow in its focus. Dennis Harvey of Variety wrote, "Intriguing enough in what it shows, Bitter Honey nonetheless frustrates for what it doesn't."
