= Robert B. Doyle =

Robert B. Doyle was appointed a judge of the Family Division of the Manitoba Court of King's Bench on February 29, 2000. He replaced Mr. Justice Gil Goodman, who chose to become a supernumerary judge.

Mr. Justice Doyle received his Bachelor of Laws from the University of Manitoba in 1979 and was called to the Manitoba Bar in 1980. Prior to his appointment, Mr. Justice Doyle practised law with the firm of Pollock & Company in Winnipeg, primarily in the areas of civil litigation and family law. Mr. Justice Doyle has appeared before various administrative tribunals, including the Canada Industrial Relations Board. He is a member of the Canadian Bar Association (Manitoba Branch) and a Lifetime Member of Council of the Manitoba Bar Association. He also served as the Manitoba Bar Association representative on the Advisory Committee for the Pilot Project on Case Management in the Family Division of the Court of Queen's Bench.
