= Lori Spivak =

The Honourable Lori T. Spivak

Judge of the Court of Appeal for Manitoba
- Incumbent
- Assumed office 2019
- Preceded by: H. C. Beard

Judge of the Manitoba Court of King's Bench
- In office 2005–2019

Personal details
- Education: University of Manitoba (BA, LLB)
- Occupation: Judge

The Honourable Lori T. Spivak, a puisne Judge of His Majesty's Court of King's Bench for Manitoba, was appointed a Judge of Appeal of the Court of Appeal for Manitoba. She replaces Justice H.C. Beard (Winnipeg), who elected to become a supernumerary judge effective January 1, 2019. She was previously a judge of the Manitoba Court of King's Bench, appointed on May 20, 2005.

== Life ==
Spivak received a Bachelor of Arts in 1978 and a Bachelor of Laws in 1981, both from the University of Manitoba. She was admitted to the Manitoba Bar in 1982. She was appointed to the Manitoba Court of Queen's Bench (General Division) in May 2005.

Spivak practised with the law firm of Aikins, MacAulay & Thorvaldson in Winnipeg. She practised in the areas of civil litigation, professional regulation and discipline, and administrative law (as a labour arbitrator and human rights adjudicator). Spivak served as President of the Law Society of Manitoba and President of the Federation of Law Societies of Canada. She has also been a Bencher, a past president, and member of committees for the Law Society of Manitoba. She was a professor at the Bar Admission Course and is a frequent lecturer. She was course head of the Ethics, Professional Responsibility and Law Office Management Bar Admission Course and a faculty member of the Civil Procedure segment. Her volunteer work included participating in various organizations within Winnipeg's Jewish community and serving on the board of the Winnipeg Symphony Orchestra.

Spivak has presided over a range of cases in criminal, constitutional and civil law. She is co-chair of the Manitoba Court of Queen's Bench Judicial Education Committee, which is responsible for planning the educational conferences and programs for the court. She has also worked with the National Judicial Institute, along with other judges, on the development of an Education Plan for new judges. She is a board member for both the Manitoba Law Reform Commission and the Canadian Chapter of the International Association of Women Judges.
