= Justice Goldberg =

Justice Goldberg may refer to:

- Arthur Goldberg (1908–1990), associate justice of the Supreme Court of the United States
- Eliezer Goldberg (1931–2022), judge of the Supreme Court of Israel
- Maureen McKenna Goldberg (fl. 1960s–2020s), justice of the Rhode Island Supreme Court
