= Hector Mansfield Howell =

Canadian lawyer

Hector Mansfield Howell (17 September 1842 – 7 April 1918) was a Canadian lawyer and judge. He was Chief Justice of Manitoba from 1909 to 1918.
