= Peter Krausz =

Canadian artist (born 1946)

- Born: 1946 (age 79–80); Brașov, Romania
- Known for: Painter, Graphic artist, Installation artist, Photographer
- Elected: Royal Canadian Academy of Arts (RCA)
- Website: peterkrausz.com

Peter Krausz RCA (born 1946) is a Romanian-born Canadian artist. Throughout his career, he worked within the fields of painting, drawing, installation, and photography and, since 1970, exhibited in museums and galleries across Canada, the United States, and Europe. He is best known for large-scale landscape paintings of the Mediterranean.

Krausz's landscapes, described as "spaces halfway between the real and the imaginary", convey man's interrelationship with nature. Identified by translucent, egg-tempera color and secco technique, in a review of the (No) Man's Land exhibition at Forum Gallery, Los Angeles, ARTnews critic Richard Chang noted, "a luminosity that captured crisp light and clean shadows spreading across the island."

Born in Brașov, Romania, in 1946, Krausz pursued art encouraged by his parents, artist and art-educator Tiberiu Krausz, and Judith Krausz, an art historian. From 1964 to 1969, he studied drawing, painting and mural techniques at the Nicolae Grigorescu Fine Arts Institute in Bucharest. In 1969 Krausz and his parents fled Communist Romania through Czechoslovakia and Austria into Italy. Described as a "flight toward the unknown" and "escape across a Cold-War border", this event inspired the Berlin Series (1988) and (No) Man's Land series (2009-2014). After a year in Rome, Krausz and his family emigrated to Montreal, Canada, in 1970. He exhibited there that same year, and solo exhibitions of his work were held at Galerie Malborough-Godard in 1976 and at Galerie Theo Waddington in 1979. From 1980 to 1990, Krausz was curator of the Saidye Bronfman Centre Art Gallery and taught in the Fine Arts Department of Concordia University. In 1991, he joined the faculty of the Université de Montréal, and is a tenured Professor of Fine Art in the Art History and Cinema Studies Department.

== Career highlights ==
In 1984, Krausz participated in the important exhibitions Montréal tout-terrain, and Vent et eau at the Musée national des beaux-arts du Québec, organized by Centre international d'art contemporain de Montréal (CIAC). Solo exhibitions of his work held at the Montreal artist-run galleries Optica and Articule, drew favorable press. In 1987 at the CIAC's exhibition Stations, Krausz exhibited an installation and 70-foot drawing Archipelago, inspired by Varlam Shalamov’s memoire of 22-years of forced labor in the Soviet Gulag Kolyma. In 1989 this installation and the Berlin Series which referenced the construction of the Berlin Wall, were exhibited in a solo show at the Robert McLaughlin Gallery in Oshawa, Ontario. In 1991, Krausz’s solo exhibition, Journeys at 49th Parallel Gallery in New York, was reviewed favorably by Frederick Ted Castle in Art in America. This exhibition included the 14-painting series Night Train, inspired by Claude Lanzmann's documentary Shoah, now in the collection of the Jewish Museum (Manhattan). In 1992 Krausz’s installation Traces-mémoire was exhibited at the Centre d’art contemporain in Montpellier, France. Also exhibited in Montreal, the installation consisted of 250 lead panels, each etched with a name of a French town and date, from 535 to 1990, associated with an anti-Semitic event.

Following the collapse of the Berlin Wall and Eastern Bloc, Krausz turned to landscape. To protest the destruction of the natural world, he chose as subject the Mediterranean, its beauty and harmonious relationship between man and nature. By the time of his Landscape and Memory series (1996-1998), Krausz's signature style of rich, vibrant colors using a unique secco technique was evident. Solo exhibitions held at the Musée d’art de Joliette in 1990, and a subsequent series The Song of the Earth, exhibited in 2004 at the Musée Régional de Rimouski, established Krausz’s critical reputation. From 2009 to 2014, the series (No) Man's Land, which contrasted the beauty of Cyprus with a "no man's land" zone between the Greek and Turkish communities was exhibited at the Maison de la Culture Côte-des-Neiges (Montreal) and at the Ottawa School of Art (Orleans ON). Paintings in this series were also exhibited in solo shows at Forum Gallery (New York and Los Angeles), Galerie de Bellefeuille (Montreal), and Gallery Jones (Vancouver). Krausz also exhibited large-scale drawings including portraits at the Montreal Museum of Fine Arts in 2013, and in Toronto at Mira Godard Gallery in 2012 and 2015, and John B. Aird Gallery in 2015.

== Techniques ==
Throughout his career, Krausz explored a variety of painting and drawing techniques, mediums and surfaces including stretched and unstretched canvas and sculpted wood. In an early Optica exhibition, his concern for drawing and its integration within painting was noted. He explored various painting mediums and used iron-oxide pigment on a wet clay surface for Archipelago (1987), oil and tar for August 13, 1961 (1988) of the Berlin Series, and oil on oxidized copper for the Night Train (1988) series. During the 1990s, Krausz also experimented with pigments suspended in an egg-based emulsion on various surfaces, and developed a unique secco technique using a dry surface primed with marble powder and acrylic gels. His (No) Man’s Land series (2009-2014) included egg tempera on secco paintings as well as panels painted with oil and tar, similar to Paysages (1986) or the Berlin Series (1988). In a recent portrait series, Krausz experimented with drawing in conté on mylar. He also incorporated photography within the installations Suite Roumaine and Traces-mémoire (1992) or exhibited photographs as individual works for the De Natura (Humana) exhibition.

== Recognition and contribution ==
Early in his career, Krausz's work drew attention for its political iconography and illustration of "the abuses, subjugation and suffering stemming from totalitarism". In 1989, at the time of the Robert McLaughlin Gallery exhibition, art historian James D. Campbell wrote that Krausz "is above all, a humanist and his continuing attempts at commemoration — both vehemently personal and unavoidably universal — have a deeply felt and humanizing focus." In his review of Krausz's 1991 Journeys exhibition published in Art in America, Frederick Ted Castle wrote, "Peter Krausz takes trips that are calculated to remind us that isolation—and brutalization—are human experiences that know no historical period, no geographical area nor cultural configuration, and his souvenirs make effective art." Since the mid 1990s, Krausz's secco landscape series has been praised for their subtle, commemorative messaging and meditative, yet disquieting beauty. For ARTnews reviewer Richard Chang, his work "offered a serene meditation on nature and of how humans have imprinted it with boundaries." As a contemporary artist working within a classic medium, curator Jocelyne Fortin of the Musée Régional de Rimouski credits Krausz for "breathing new life" into landscape and for shaping "it into a unique and stunning style." For her, "Peter Krausz has invented a highly colourful and emotional wordless language."

In recognition of his artistic accomplishments, Krausz was elected to the Royal Canadian Academy of Arts (RCA) in 2011. His work was the subject of several documentaries including Doina Harap's Peter Krausz No Mans Land (2009) which premiered at the Festival international du film sur l'art (Montreal). During his career, he was awarded multiple grants from the Canada Council for the Arts and Conseil des arts et des lettres du Québec, as well as won four "integration of art within architecture" competitions including a mural for the Pointe-à-Callière Museum (Montreal). Krausz has also served on juries for the Governor General's Award in Visual and Media Arts, Canada Council for the Arts, Ministère des Affaires culturelles du Québec as well as the Conseil des arts et des lettres du Québec.

His work is found in the permanent collection of Canada Council for the Arts Art Bank, the Musée national des beaux-arts du Québec, the Musée d'art contemporain de Montréal, the Montreal Museum of Fine Arts, the Robert McLaughlin Gallery, Lethbridge Art Gallery, the Jewish Museum (Manhattan), Arkansas Art Centre, and Artothèque (Montpellier, France). His work is included in the collections of the Department of External Affairs of Canada, the Montreal Arts Council, Musée d’archéologie Pointe-à-Callière, Bibliothèque nationale du Québec, Musée d'art de Joliette, Musée des Beaux-arts de Sherbrooke, and Musée Régional de Rimouski. His work is also found in the corporate collections of Air Canada, Astral Media, Bank of Nova Scotia, Bell Canada, Bombardier, Cirque du Soleil, Citibank, Royal Bank of Canada, Sun Life of Canada, and Teleglobe Canada.

Selected Museum Solo Exhibitions
- 2014 (No) Man’s Land. Ottawa School of Art (Orleans ON)
- 2013 Peter Krausz 2003-2013: un survol. Musée de beaux-arts de Sherbrooke (Sherbrooke QC)
- 2010 (No) Man’s Land. Maison de la Culture Côte-des-Neiges (Montreal QC)
- 2006 (Sans) Horizon. Centre National d’exposition de Jonquière (Jonquière QC)
- 2004 Le paysage selon Peter Krausz. Musée régional de Rimouski (Rimouski QC)
- 1999 Peter Krausz: les paysages. Musée d'art de Joliette (Joliette QC)
- 1996 Echoïc Landscapes. Leonard & Bina Ellen Art Gallery (Montreal QC)
- 1992 Traces-mémoire (installation). Centre d’art contemporain (Montpellier France)
- 1991 Traces. Délégation du Québec (Paris, France)
- 1991 Journeys. 49th Parallel Gallery. (New York NY)
- 1991 Krausz: 1985-1990. Art Institute (Odessa TX)
- 1990 Même vaisseau, même ouragan, même abîme..., Musée du Québec (Quebec QC)
- 1989 Peter Krausz - Sites (1984-1989), Robert McLaughlin Gallery (Oshawa ON)
