= Martin Joseph Freeman =

American scholar of English literature

Martin Joseph "Tom" Freeman (1899 – 1969) was an American scholar of English literature and novelist. Freeman taught at the University of Chicago and then as an Associate Professor of English at Hunter College. His semi-autobiographical childhood account of growing up in the Midwest, Bitter Honey (1942), was awarded Ohio's literary award.

== Works ==
- The Murder of a Midget, New York, E.P. Dutton & Co. 1931
- Murder by Magic, New York : E .P. Dutton, 1932.
- The Case of the Blind Mouse, 1936.
- A Text of Shelley's Prometheus Unbound, Chicago, Illinois, 1937
- Bitter Honey, New York, Macmillan Co., 1942. - winner of the Ohioana Award
