= Barbara Hamilton (judge) =

Barbara M. Hamilton KC was judge of the Manitoba Court of King's Bench. She was appointed to the Manitoba Court of Appeal on July 17, 2002. She replaced Guy J. Kroft, who elected to become a supernumerary judge.

Hamilton received a Bachelor of Laws from the University of Manitoba in 1976 and was called to the Manitoba Bar in 1977. Until 1980, she practised general law with the firm of Martens, Kripiakevich, Dennehy, Parfeniuk & Ernst. From 1980 until 1987, she practised mainly corporate and commercial law with the firm of Scarth, Simonsen, Dooley, Olsen & Wiens, with whom she became a partner in 1985. From 1987 until her appointment to the bench, Hamilton was a partner with the firm Aikins, MacAulay & Thorvaldson. She has acted as a bencher, vice-president (1991–1992) and president (1992–1993) of the Law Society of Manitoba.

She was appointed to the Court of Queen's Bench on July 27, 1995. She replaced W. S. Wright, who chose to become a supernumerary judge. She retired on January 1, 2014.
