= Otto Lang (actor) =

German actor and director

Otto Lang (August 24, 1906 – June 24, 1984) was a German actor and director.

From 1953 to 1958 he was Rector of the Drama School of Leipzig. From 1958 to 1973 he was director of the German National Theater in Weimar.

== Literature ==
- Kuckhoff, Armin-Gerd: In Memoriam Otto Lang, in: Shakespeare Jahrbuch 121 (1985), S. 7-8. Kuckhoff, Armin-Gerd: In Memoriam Otto Lang, in Shakespeare Yearbook 121 (1985), p. 7-8.
