= Glenn Joyal =

Justice of the Supreme Court of Canada

The Honourable Glenn Joyal

Puisne Justice of the Supreme Court of Canada
- Incumbent
- Assumed office July 15, 2026
- Nominated by: Mark Carney
- Appointed by: Louise Arbour
- Preceded by: Sheilah Martin

Chief Justice of the Court of King's Bench of Manitoba
- In office February 4, 2011 – June 30, 2026

Personal details
- Education: St. Paul's High School; Simon Fraser University (BA); University of Manitoba (MA); McGill University (LLB)

Glenn D. Joyal is a puisne justice of the Supreme Court of Canada. In June 2026, Prime Minister Mark Carney announced that Joyal would be appointed to the court, succeeding Justice Sheilah Martin who retired in May 2026. His appointment became effective July 15, 2026.

He was formerly a lawyer and then a judge of all three courts of Manitoba. Prior to his appointment to the Supreme Court, he had been the Chief Justice of the Court of King's Bench of Manitoba, since 2011.

He assumed office upon his swearing-in on July 15, 2026.

== Early life and education ==
Joyal‘s father was a Franco-Manitoban, with deep roots in the Franco-Manitoban community, while his mother had Polish heritage. He was raised in St. Boniface, a city ward of Winnipeg, Manitoba.

He graduated from St. Paul's High School in 1978. He then graduated from Simon Fraser University in 1983 and also received a Master of Arts (with distinction) from the University of Manitoba in 1992. He completed his Bachelor of Laws in 1986 at McGill University and then pursued Graduate Studies in Public Law and Political Theory at Oxford University from 1995–1996.

== Legal and judicial career ==
He was admitted to the Bar of Manitoba in 1987 and practised as a Provincial Crown Attorney in Manitoba (1986–1990), with Justice Canada (1990–1997) and then with the firm of Wolch Pinx Tapper Scurfield in Winnipeg (1997–1998). He was a member of the Assiciation des juristes d'expression française du Manitoba.

Joyal was appointed a judge of the Provincial Court of Manitoba in 1998, where he developed his expertise in criminal and constitutional law and served on several Provincial Court committees.

On March 2, 2007, he was appointed to the Manitoba Court of Appeal, replacing Charles Huband. He was appointed to the Manitoba Court of Queen’s Bench (now the Court of King's Bench) on July 10, 2007, replacing A. L. Clearwater, who elected to become a supernumerary judge. He was appointed Associate Chief Justice of the Queen's Bench in January 2009. He replaced Marc M. Monnin as Chief Justice of the King's Bench upon his elevation to the Court of Appeal of Manitoba.

=== Surveillance of Chief Justice Joyal by lawyers ===
In July 2021, Joyal was presiding over a case in the Manitoba Queen's Bench brought by a group of churches to challenge restrictions relating to the COVID pandemic. On July 12, during the case, Joyal announced in court that he had discovered that he had been followed by a private detective, at both his home and his cottage.

After a short adjournment, the two lawyers representing the churches admitted that they had hired private detectives to tail public figures, hoping to catch them breaching the COVID restrictions that they were enforcing on the public. The two lawyers, John Carpay and Jay Cameron, both from Alberta, apologised to the court. Joyal accepted their apology and proceeded with the hearing.

Carpay and Cameron were subsequently disbarred by the Law Society of Alberta.

== Supreme Court of Canada ==
=== Appointment process ===
In January 2026, Justice Sheilah Martin announced that she would retire from the Supreme Court on May 30, 2026. Her successor was expected to come from western or northern Canada.

On June 22, 2026, Prime Minister Mark Carney announced that Joyal was his choice to replace Justice Martin. He is Carney's first Supreme Court appointee.

Joyal's appointment was formalized on June 30, 2026. He took office on July 15, 2026, after being sworn in by Chief Justice Richard Wagner.

== Personal life ==
Joyal is married to a Franco-Manitoban.

Alongside his native English and French, Joyal is also fluent in Italian, which he studied at the Scuola Dante Alighieri in Florence and at the Instituto Michelangelo in Venice.

Joyal has been Vice-Chair of the Board of Directors for St. Mary's Academy and a Member of the Board of Directors for Le Cercle Molière.

He is also an amateur playwright, who has had his plays produced in theatres.
