= Martin Freedman =

Canadian judge

Martin H. Freedman, QC, was appointed a judge of the Manitoba Court of Appeal on July 16, 2002, and retired from the court in 2012. He replaced Bonnie M. Helper, who resigned.

Freedman received a bachelor of law from the University of Manitoba in 1963 and won the Gold Medal in Law from both the University of Manitoba and the Law Society of Manitoba. At the time of his appointment, he was a partner at the Winnipeg law firm Aikins MacAulay & Thorvaldson. He served as the firm's managing partner from 1991 until 2001. Throughout his career, he acquired expertise in corporate-commercial law and arbitration-mediation matters. In recent years, Freedman has concentrated his practice on arbitration, especially in labour-related disputes in different jurisdictions throughout Canada.

Over the course of his legal career, Freedman was active in a range of professional organizations, including as president (1978–1979) and bencher (1971–1979) of the Law Society of Manitoba and as a director of the Federation of Law Societies of Canada (1981–1983). For twenty years, he was a lecturer at the University of Manitoba Faculty of Law and a frequent presenter at professional and continuing legal education seminars. Freedman was appointed Queen's Counsel in 1975.

His father, Samuel Freedman, also served as a judge of the Manitoba Court of Appeal (1960–1983).
