= Supernumerary judge =

A supernumerary judge or supernumerary magistrate is a judge who has retired from a full-time position on a court, but continues to work part-time. Generally, when a judge becomes supernumerary, a vacancy is created, and the appropriate person or body may subsequently make a new appointment to that Court.

The role of supernumerary judges varies by jurisdiction. In the United States federal courts, this describes the status of judges who have taken senior status. Supernumerary judges are widely used in Alabama, for example, where the chief justice of the state supreme court can assign retired judges or justices to act as supernumerary judges on any court of the state. Similarly, retired judges of the Judiciary of New Jersey may be recalled into service and, as of April 2023, there are about 75 to 80 judges on recall.

Supernumerary judicial positions are also widely used in Canada. In Canada, a judge may request supernumerary status when they have continued in judicial office for at least 15 years and their combined age and number of years in judicial office is not less than 80 or they have attained the age of 70 years and have continued in judicial office for at least 10 years. The salary of each supernumerary judge of a superior court is the salary annexed to the office of a judge of that court other than a chief justice, senior associate chief justice, or associate chief justice.
