= Manitoba Court of Appeal =

Court of appeal in Manitoba, Canada

Manitoba Court of Appeal Cour d'appel du Manitoba
- Interactive map of Manitoba Court of Appeal; Cour d'appel du Manitoba
- 49.887853°N 97.146821°W
- Established: 1906
- Jurisdiction: Manitoba
- Location: Law Courts Building, 408 York Ave, Winnipeg, Manitoba R3C 0P9
- Coordinates: 49.887853°N 97.146821°W
- Authorised by: The Court of Appeal Act (and Court of Appeal Rules); Criminal Code of Canada (and Manitoba Criminal Appeal Rules)
- Appeals from: Manitoba Court of King's Bench; Provincial Court of Manitoba
- Website: manitobacourts.mb.ca/court-of-appeal/

Chief Justice of Manitoba
- Currently: Marianne Rivoalen

The Manitoba Court of Appeal (French: Cour d'appel du Manitoba) is the court of appeal in, and the highest court of, the Canadian province of Manitoba. It hears criminal, civil, and family law cases, as well as appeals from various administrative boards and tribunals.

Seated in Winnipeg, the Court is headed by the Chief Justice of Manitoba, and is composed of a total of 13 justices. At any given time, there may be one or more additional justices who sit as supernumerary justices.

The Court hears appeals from the Provincial Court and the Manitoba Court of King's Bench, as well as certain administrative tribunals, including the Residential Tenancies Commission, the Municipal Board, and the Manitoba Labour Board, among others.

Most cases are heard by a panel of three justices. A single justice presides over matters heard in "chambers", usually interlocutory matters or applications for leave to appeal. Proceedings before the court are governed by the Court of Appeal Rules.

== Judges ==
Pursuant to The Court of Appeal Act, the Court consists of a Chief Justice and 12 other judges, all of whom are federally-appointed pursuant to the Judges Act.

As a "Superior Court" under section 96 of the federal Constitution Act, 1867, Court of Appeal judges are appointed by the Governor-General of Canada (in practical terms, the Prime Minister of Canada). Appointees must be members of the Manitoba bar, but need not have had previous experience as a judge. However, appointees almost always have some experience as a judge, usually on the Manitoba Court of King's Bench.

Under the Judges Act, federally-appointed judges (such as those on the Manitoba Court of Appeal) may—after being in judicial office for at least 15 years and whose combined age and number of years of judicial service is not less than 80 or after the age of 70 years and at least 10 years judicial service—elect to give up their regular judicial duties and hold office as a supernumerary judge.

The first female appointed to the Court was Bonnie M. Helper, on 30 June 1989. The sons of two former Court of Appeal justices (Samuel Freedman and Alfred Monnin) currently or have recently served as judges on the court (Martin Freedman, Michel Monnin, and Marc Monnin).

=== Current justices ===
Current justices, as of September 2023
Judge	Position	Appointment to Court	Nominated by	Previous appointment
Marianne Rivoalen	Chief Justice	June 1, 2023	Trudeau	Justice, Federal Court of Appeal (2018-2023)
Diana M. Cameron	Judge	November 2, 2012	Harper	Judge of the Court of King’s Bench (February 3, 2011)
Christopher J. Mainella	Judge	October 1, 2013	Harper	Judge of the Court of King’s Bench (October 4, 2012)
Jennifer A. Pfuetzner	Judge	June 19, 2015	Harper	Judge of the Court of King's Bench (October 9, 2014)
Janice leMaistre	Judge	June 19, 2015	Harper	Judge of the Provincial Court (November 22, 2006) Associate Chief Judge of the Provincial Court (September 9, 2009)
James Edmond	Judge	August 28, 2023	Trudeau	Justice of the Manitoba Court of King's Bench (2013 to 2023)
David J. Kroft	Judge	August 28, 2023	Trudeau	Justice of the Manitoba Court of King's Bench (2016 to 2023)
Anne Turner	Judge	August 28, 2023	Trudeau	Justice of the Manitoba Court of King's Bench (2019 to 2023)
Holly C. Beard	Supernumerary judge	September 9, 2009; January 1, 2019 (supernumerary)	Harper	Judge of the Court of King's Bench (November 27, 1992)
Marc M. Monnin	Supernumerary judge	February 3, 2011; September 1, 2016 (supernumerary)	Harper	Judge of the Court of King's Bench (August 27, 1997); Chief Justice of the Court of King's Bench (March 26, 2003)
Karen Simonsen	Supernumerary Judge	August 31, 2018; October 8, 2022 (supernumerary)	Trudeau	Judge of the Court of King's Bench (December 9, 2004)
Lori Spivak	Supernumerary Judge	March 26, 2019; September 1, 2022	Trudeau	Judge of the Court of King's Bench (May 19, 2005)

=== Past justices ===
Name	Date of appointment	Nominated by	Additional information
Hector Mansfield Howell	July 23, 1906		Initially appointed as "Chief Justice Appeal," his title was changed to Chief Justice of Manitoba on 15 November 1909; he served in that position until 7 April 1918
William Egerton Perdue	July 23, 1906		Chief Justice of Manitoba from 25 May 1918 until 30 December 1929
Frank Hedley Phippen	July 23, 1906		
Albert Elswood Richards	July 23, 1906		
John Donald Cameron	April 27, 1909		
Alexander Haggart	April 3, 1912		
Charles Perry Fullerton	July 20, 1917		
Robert Maxwell Dennistoun	July 2, 1918	Borden	
Thomas Llewellyn Metcalfe	October 3, 1921	Mackenzie King	
James Emile Pierre Prendergast	May 1, 1922	Mackenzie King	Chief Justice of Manitoba from 30 December 1929 until 18 March 1944
Walter Harley Trueman	April 14, 1923	Mackenzie King	
Hugh Amos Robson	December 31, 1929	Mackenzie King	
Stephen Elswood Richards	March 11, 1932	Bennett	
Hjalmar August Bergman	March 18, 1944	Mackenzie King	
Ewan Alexander McPherson	March 15, 1944	Mackenzie King	Chief Justice of Manitoba from 18 March 1944 until 18 November 1954
James Bowes Coyne	December 10, 1946	Mackenzie King	
Andrew Knox Dysart	September 11, 1947	Mackenzie King	
John Evans Adamson	January 30, 1948	Mackenzie King	Chief Justice of Manitoba from January 1955 until 1 March 1961
Percival John Montague	February 1, 1951	St. Laurent	
Joseph Thomas Beaubien	August 27, 1952	St. Laurent	
Ivan Schultz	January 13, 1955	St. Laurent	
George Eric Tritschler	April 18, 1957	St. Laurent	
Calvert Charlton Miller	October 21, 1959	Diefenbaker	Appointed Chief Justice of Manitoba on 1 March 1961
Samuel Freedman	March 10, 1960	Diefenbaker	Chief Justice of Manitoba from 22 March 1971 until 1983
Robert DuVal Guy	March 1, 1961	Diefenbaker	
Alfred Maurice Monnin	January 3, 1962	Diefenbaker	Chief Justice of Manitoba from 16 April 1983 until 1990
Charles Rhodes Smith	November 22, 1966	Pearson	Chief Justice of Manitoba from 13 June 1967 until 1971
Robert George Brian Dickson	June 13, 1967	Pearson	Later elevated to the Supreme Court of Canada, eventually serving as Chief Justice of Canada
Gordon Clarke Hall	May 14, 1971	Trudeau, Sr.	
Roy Joseph Matas	August 15, 1973	Trudeau, Sr.	
Joseph Francis O'Sullivan	July 24, 1975	Trudeau, Sr.	
Charles Richard Huband	February 20, 1979	Trudeau, Sr.	
Alan Reed Philp	May 5, 1983	Trudeau, Sr.	
Archibald Kerr Twaddle	August 22, 1985	Mulroney	
Sterling Rufus Lyon	December 19, 1986	Mulroney	
Bonnie M. Helper	June 30, 1989	Mulroney	
Guy Joseph Kroft	February 1, 1993	Mulroney	
Glenn D. Joyal	March 2, 2007	Harper	Appointed to the Court of King's Bench of Manitoba on 10 July 2007
Michel A. Monnin	July 26, 1995	Chrétien	Appointed to the Court of King's Bench of Manitoba on 23 March 1984
Barbara M. Hamilton	July 16, 2002	Chrétien	Appointed to the Court of King's Bench of Manitoba on 26 July 1995

== Chief Justice of Manitoba ==
Chief Justice of Manitoba
- Incumbent; Richard J. F. Chartier since March 7, 2013; 13 years ago
- Style: Honourable Mr. Chief Justice
- Member of: Manitoba Court of Appeal
- Nominator: Governor General of Canada (Prime Minister of Canada)
- Formation: 1906

The Chief Justice of Manitoba heads the Manitoba Court of Appeal. The Chief Justice is responsible for the judicial functions of the court, including direction over sittings of the court and the assignment of judicial duties.

From 1872 to 1906, the Chief Justice was seated in the Court of Queen’s/King's Bench, which held appellate jurisdiction. The appellate jurisdiction was transferred to the Court of Appeal upon its creation in 1906, and thereafter, the Chief Justice of the Court of Appeal has been the Chief Justice of Manitoba.

Name	Term	Notes
Court of King's Bench (1872–1906)
Alexander Morris	July 1872 – Dec 1872	
Edmund Burke Wood	1874 – 1882	
Lewis Wallbridge	1882 – 1887	
Thomas Wardlaw Taylor	1887–1899	Knighted in 1897 Diamond Jubilee Honours
Albert Clements Killam	1899–1903	to Supreme Court of Canada, 1903
Joseph Dubuc	1903–1909	Position moved to Court of Appeal from 1906
Court of Appeal (1906–present)
Hector Mansfield Howell	Nov 1909–Apr 1918	
William Egerton Perdue	1918–1929	
James Emile Pierre Prendergast	Dec 1929–Mar 1944	
Ewan Alexander McPherson	Mar 1944–Nov 1954	
John Evans Adamson	Jan 1955–Mar 1961	
Calvert Charlton Miller	Mar 1961–Feb 1967	
Samuel Freedman	1966–1967	Acting Chief Justice during Miller's illness
Charles Rhodes Smith	June 1967–Mar 1971	
Samuel Freedman	Mar 1971–Apr 1983	
Alfred Maurice Monnin	Apr 1983–Jan 1990	
Richard Jamieson Scott	July 1990–Mar 2013	
Richard J. F. Chartier	2013–May 2023	
Marianne Rivoalen	2023–	
