= Court of King's Bench of Manitoba =

Canadian trial court

- Established: 1872
- Jurisdiction: Manitoba
- Authorised by: The Court of Queen's Bench Act
- Website: manitobacourts.mb.ca/court-of-queens-bench/

Chief Justice
- Currently: Glenn Joyal
- Since: February 3, 2011; 15 years ago

Associate Chief Justice (General Division)
- Currently: Shane I. Perlmutter
- Since: March 7, 2013; 13 years ago

Associate Chief Justice (Family Division)
- Currently: Gwen B. Hatch
- Since: May 14, 2020; 6 years ago

The Court of King's Bench of Manitoba (French: Cour du Banc du Roi du Manitoba)—or the Court of Queen's Bench of Manitoba, depending on the monarch—is the superior court of the Canadian province of Manitoba.

The court is divided into two divisions. The Family Division deals with family law cases including divorces, guardianships, adoptions and child welfare. The General Division deals with civil and criminal matters, including civil trials, probate law, indictable offences and applications for the review of decisions from certain administrative tribunals.

The current Chief Justice of the Court of King's Bench as of 2021 is Judge Glenn Joyal, who was appointed on 3 February 2011.

== History of the Court ==
In May 1871, the legislature of Manitoba enacted The Supreme Court Act to establish a superior court with original and appellate jurisdiction in the province, called the Manitoba Supreme Court. The law provided:

There shall be constituted a Court of Justice for the Province of Manitoba, to be styled "The Supreme Court," which shall have jurisdiction over ail matters of Law and Equity, ail matters of wills and intestacy, and shall possess such powers and authorities in relation to matters of Local or Provincial jurisdiction, as in England are distributed among the Superior Courts of Law and Equity, and of Probate.

The Act also established inferior courts known as Petty Sessions. In 1872, The Supreme Court Act was amended by the Manitoba Legislature to change the name of the court to "The Court of Queen's Bench," and the first chief justice was appointed in July that year. Also that year, the Petty Sessions were abolished and County Courts were established.

In 1906, the appellate jurisdiction of the Court of Queen's Bench was transferred to the newly-established Manitoba Court of Appeal. In 1984, the County Courts were merged with the Court of Queen's Bench, and the judges of the County Courts became Court of Queen's Bench judges. Further, in 1984 the Family Division of the Court of Queen's Bench was established.

== Divisions ==
The court is divided into two divisions.

The Family Division deals with cases of family law and child protection, including divorces, guardianships, adoptions, and child welfare. Judges of the Family Division sit in Flin Flon, Morden, Selkirk, St. Boniface, The Pas, Thompson, and Winnipeg.

The General Division deals with civil and criminal matters, including civil trials, probate law, indictable offences and applications for the review of decisions from certain administrative tribunals. Judges of the General Division sit in Brandon, Dauphin, Flin Flon, Morden, Portage la Prairie, Selkirk, St. Boniface, Swan River, The Pas, Thompson, and Winnipeg.

== Judges ==
=== Current justices ===
Current judges, as of August 2024
| Judge | Title | Appointed | Location |
|---|---|---|---|
| Glenn D. Joyal | Chief Justice | February 3, 2011 | Winnipeg |
| Shane I. Perlmutter | Associate Chief Justice (General Division) | March 7, 2013 | Winnipeg |
| Gwen B. Hatch | Associate Chief Justice (Family Division) | May 14, 2020 | Winnipeg |
| Brenda L. Keyser | Supernumerary judge | October 3, 1995; April 4, 2014 (Supernumerary status) | Winnipeg |
| John A. Menzies | Supernumerary judge | August 7, 1996 (Family Division); October 6, 1998 (General Division); September 1, 2017 (Supernumerary status) | Brandon |
| Deborah J. McCawley | Supernumerary judge | September 16, 1997; May 26, 2014 (Supernumerary status) | Winnipeg |
| Frank Aquila | Supernumerary judge (Family Division) | February 28, 2000; January 1, 2016 (Supernumerary status) | Winnipeg |
| Robert B. Doyle | Judge (Family Division) | February 28, 2000 | Winnipeg |
| Joan G. McKelvey | Judge | September 27, 2001 | Winnipeg |
| Colleen Suche | Supernumerary judge | July 16, 2002; November 19, 2018 (Supernumerary status) | Winnipeg |
| Shawn D. Greenberg | Judge | October 28, 2003 | Winnipeg |
| A. Catherine Everett | Judge (Family Division) | November 22, 2006 | Winnipeg |
| Michael A. Thomson | Judge (Family Division) | June 1, 2007 | Winnipeg |
| Douglas N. Abra | Supernumerary judge | June 22, 2007 (effective July 10); July 10, 2017 (Supernumerary status) | Winnipeg |
| Joan A. MacPhail | Judge (Family Division) | January 22, 2009 | Winnipeg |
| Chris W. Martin | Judge | January 22, 2009 | Winnipeg |
| William Johnston | Judge (Family Division) | July 30, 2009 | Winnipeg |
| Robert A. Dewar | Judge | September 9, 2009 | Winnipeg |
| Richard A. Saull | Judge | February 10, 2010 | Winnipeg |
| Gerald L. Chartier | Judge | September 30, 2010 | Winnipeg |
| Herbert Rempel | Judge | December 1, 2011 (Family Division); March 7, 2013 (General Division) | Winnipeg |
| Sheldon W. Lanchbery | Judge | June 6, 2013 | Winnipeg |
| James G. Edmond | Judge | October 1, 2013 | Winnipeg |
| Victor E. Toews | Judge | March 7, 2014 | Winnipeg |
| Sadie Bond | Judge | April 11, 2014 | Winnipeg |
| Allan D. Dueck | Judge (Family Division) | May 9, 2014 | Winnipeg |
| Sandra Zinchuk | Judge | February 26, 2015 | Dauphin |
| Kaye E. Dunlop | Judge (Family Division) | June 19, 2015 | Winnipeg |
| Regan Thatcher | Judge (Family Division) | June 19, 2015 | Winnipeg |
| Lore Mirwaldt | Judge (Family Division) | October 20, 2016 | Winnipeg |
| David Kroft | Judge | October 20, 2016 | Winnipeg |
| Candace Grammond | Judge | October 20, 2016 | Winnipeg |
| Scott Abel | Judge | December 19, 2017 | Brandon |
| Kenneth Champagne | Judge | April 4, 2018 | Winnipeg |
| Jeffrey Harris | Judge | October 9, 2018 | Winnipeg |
| Connie Petersen | Judge (Family Division) | October 9, 2018 | Winnipeg |
| Annette Horst | Judge (Family Division) | October 9, 2018 | Winnipeg |
| Shauna Mc Carthy | Judge | June 27, 2019 | Winnipeg |
| Anne Turner | Judge | June 27, 2019 | Winnipeg |
| Theodor Bock | Judge | February 5, 2020 | Winnipeg |
| Elliot H. Leven | Judge | December 11, 2020 | Brandon |
| L. Kim Antonio | Judge (Family Division) | December 11, 2020 | Winnipeg |
| Brian Bowman | Judge | March 2, 2024 | Winnipeg |

=== Past justices ===
Past justices of the Court of King's Bench of Manitoba have included:

- Gordon J. Barkman
- Alexander Morris
- James Charles McKeagney
- Louis Betourney
- Edmund Burke Wood
- Joseph Dubuc (Chief Justice of Manitoba from August 8, 1903 until 1909)
- James Andrews Miller
- Lewis Wallbridge
- Thomas Wardlaw Taylor
- Robert Smith
- Albert Clements Killam
- John Farquhar Bain
- Albert Elswood Richards
- William Edgerton Perdue
- Thomas Graham Mathers
- Daniel Alexander Macdonald
- John Donald Cameron
- Thomas Llewellyn Metcalfe
- James Emile Pierre Prendergast
- Hugh Amos Robson
- Alexander Casmir Galt
- John Philpot Curran
- Andrew Knox Dysart
- John Evans Adamson
- James Frederick Kilgour
- William James Donovan
- Percival John Montague
- Fawcett Gowler Taylor
- Ewan Alexander McPherson
- William James Major
- Esten Kenneth Williams
- Arnold Munroe Campbell
- Joseph Thomas Beaubien
- John Joseph Kelly
- Robert George Brian Dickson
- John Alton Duncan
- Richard J. Scott (currently serving as Chief Justice of the Manitoba Court of Appeal)
- Michel A. Monnin (currently serving as a judge on the Manitoba Court of Appeal)
- Freda M. Steel (currently serving as a judge on the Manitoba Court of Appeal)
- Barbara M. Hamilton
- Alan D. MacInnes (currently serving as a judge on the Manitoba Court of Appeal)
- Lori Douglas
- Robyn Diamond

== See also ==
- Manitoba Justice
- Manitoba Court of Appeal
- Provincial Court of Manitoba
- Judicial appointments in Canada
