= A. Lorne Campbell =

Canadian lawyer (1920–2014)

A. Lorne Campbell O.C., C.D., Q.C.

42nd President of the Canadian Bar Association
- In office 1970–1971
- Preceded by: Arthur Sydney Pattillo, QC
- Succeeded by: John Lauchlan Farris, QC

Personal details
- Born: September 18, 1920 Winnipeg, Manitoba, Canada
- Died: January 15, 2014 (aged 93) Winnipeg, Manitoba, Canada
- Spouse: Kathleen F. Campbell (née Perkin)
- Children: Andrew, Jennifer, Deborah and Duncan
- Education: United College, Winnipeg; Manitoba Law School
- Profession: Lawyer

Military service
- Branch/service: Canadian Army
- Rank: Lieutenant-Colonel
- Unit: Royal Canadian Artillery, 14th Field Regiment
- Battles/wars: Juno Beach
- Awards: Canadian Forces' Decoration

Andrew Lorne Campbell (known as A. Lorne Campbell), O.C., C.D., LL.B., LL.D., D.C.L., Q.C. (September 18, 1920 – January 15, 2014) was a Canadian lawyer in Winnipeg, Manitoba. He was very active in his community and in the legal profession, serving as President of The Law Society of Manitoba and as the national President of the Canadian Bar Association.

== Early life and family ==
Campbell was born in Winnipeg, the son of Arnold Munroe and Petrina Flora Isobel (née Wilson) Campbell. He had a brother, Allan Barrie, and a sister, Barbara (Carpenter). The family lived in East Kildonan, one of the oldest areas of Winnipeg, dating back to the Selkirk Settlers. The Campbells were descended from some of the original settlers, who arrived at the Red River colony in 1816 from Scotland.

His father, Arnold M. Campbell, K.C., was a lawyer in Winnipeg. He served as a bencher of The Law Society of Manitoba from 1944 to 1947, and was appointed a judge of the Manitoba Court of King's Bench in 1947, serving until his death on February 13, 1963.

His brother Barrie earned a Ph.D. in plant science at The University of Minnesota and worked his entire career with the Winnipeg Research Centre of Agriculture Canada. Both brothers were to receive the Order of Canada for their professional and community work.

Campbell's wife, Kathleen, was a war bride. He met her while in England during World War II. They married in 1945 and had four children: Andrew, Jennifer, Deborah and Duncan. He was pre-deceased by his younger son Duncan in 1996.

== Education ==
Campbell studied first at United College, Winnipeg (now The University of Winnipeg), and then enrolled in the Manitoba Law School (now Robson Hall (Faculty of Law – The University of Manitoba). He earned his Bachelor of Laws degree in 1947.

== Military career ==
Campbell interrupted his legal studies to join the Canadian Army in 1942, enlisting with the Royal Canadian Artillery, the same unit his father had served in during World War I. He shipped overseas as a lieutenant. On D-Day he landed on Juno Beach, Normandy, with the 14th Field Regiment of the Royal Canadian Artillery.

While in England, he met his future wife, Kathleen (née Perkin). They married in January 1945, when Campbell was able to obtain leave from his regiment, by then fighting in the Netherlands.

After the war, Campbell maintained his connection with the army, serving in the reserves from 1948 to 1958. He retired from the reserves with the rank of lieutenant colonel and the Canadian Forces' Decoration. He then served for some years as a governor of the Manitoba Division of the Canadian Corps of Commissionaires.

== Legal career ==
Campbell returned to Winnipeg in 1946 and was called to the Bar in 1947. He began practising in a firm with his father's former partner, John J. Kelly, his father having just been appointed to the Bench. He worked in a number of firms, being named Queen's Counsel in 1960, and eventually joining the large firm of Aikins, MacAulay and Thorvaldson in 1964, specialising in the area of tax and companies law. In 1963, he was on a volunteer committee of the Canadian Bar Association which assisted the Manitoba government in preparing a new Companies Act. Two other volunteers on the committee were Brian Dickson, who went on to be Chief Justice of Canada, and Irwin Dorfman who, like Campbell, would serve as national president of the Canadian Bar Association.

Like his father before him, Campbell was elected by his peers in the legal profession to serve as a Bencher of the Law Society of Manitoba, including a term as President of the Society. He was also active in the Canadian Bar Association, serving as President of the Manitoba Bar Association, and also as national President of the Canadian Bar Association in 1970–71. He was the fourth lawyer from Aikins MacAulay & Thovaldson to serve as national president, the previous three being Sir James Aikins (1914-1927), Gordon Harold Aikins (1942-1943) and John MacAulay (1953-1954). He was also a member of the Canadian Tax Foundation, an independent, non-partisan, non-profit tax research organization under the joint sponsorship of the Canadian Institute of Chartered Accountants and the Canadian Bar Association.

== The Wilson Committee: Role of the Auditor General ==
After his term as President of the Canadian Bar Association, Campbell was asked by the Auditor General of Canada to sit on the Independent Committee for the Review of the Office of the Auditor General of Canada. The other two members were the Chair, J.R.M Wilson, F.C.A., past president of the Canadian Institute of Chartered Accountants and the senior and managing partner of the large and well-known accounting firm, Clarkson, Gordon & Co., and Marcel Bélanger, also a Chartered Accountant, as well as professor of economics at Laval University, advisor to the Quebec government on public finance, and former member of several Royal Commissions.

The committee, known as the Wilson Committee, produced an extremely influential report, recommending that efficiency accounting (also known as performance audits) be used in government audits. The Wilson Committee's recommendations became the foundation for a new Auditor General Act, enacted by the federal government in 1977. When testifying in favour of the new bill in the Commons, the Auditor-General referred to the committee's report as the "Magna Carta of the [Auditor-General] office." All ten provinces subsequently passed similar legislation, authorising performance audits by the provincial auditors. The principles set out by the committee also proved very influential in other Commonwealth countries using the Westminster model of responsible government.

== Community involvement ==
For many years, Campbell was a trustee of the Manitoba Law School, and was involved in the law school becoming the Faculty of Law of The University of Manitoba in 1966. He was also the chairman of The University of Manitoba's Centennial Campaign, which included the construction of the Max Bell Centre.

Campbell was also involved with the Anglican Church in Winnipeg, serving as the Registrar of the Diocese of Rupert's Land. He also served as charter member of the Advisory Council for the Saint John's College Capital Campaign, and as chair of the special gifts committee.

Campbell worked for the Society for Crippled Children and Adults of Manitoba (now the Society for Manitobans with Disabilities), and the Canadian Rehabilitation Council for the Disabled. He eventually served as president of both groups.

Campbell served on the boards of the Manitoba Cancer Treatment and Research Foundation (now CancerCare Manitoba) from 1991 to 2003, the Deer Lodge Foundation for Geriatrics, and the Winnipeg Habitat for Humanity Foundation Advisory Board. In 2004, he was also appointed a Serving Member of the Order of Saint John.

Campbell was a member of The Manitoba Club, and a member and honorary solicitor of The Lord Selkirk Association of Rupert's Land. He was also active in The Saint Andrew's Society of Winnipeg, being an honorary life member, member of the Advisory Committee, and past president.

== Later life and death ==
Campbell finally retired from the practice of law in 2005, after a legal career of 58 years.

He died on January 15, 2014, and was buried in the Old Kildonan Presbyterian church cemetery, the Selkirk Settlers' church, after a funeral service at Saint George's Anglican Church, Wilton at Grosvenor, Winnipeg.

In his obituary, his family stated:

He never thought of living anywhere other than Winnipeg; his roots were historically established. He enjoyed the practice of law and the fellowship of both the legal profession and the many friends he made through his belief in community involvement.

== Honours and awards ==
In 1985, Campbell was named an officer of the Order of Canada. His citation mentioned his work on the Wilson Committee, "the report of which is considered a landmark study in Canada and abroad," as well as his service as President of the Canadian Bar Association and his work for the Society for Crippled Children and Adults of Manitoba and the Canadian Rehabilitation Council for the Disabled.

Campbell's other honours included:

- 1960: Queen's Counsel
- 1977: Doctor of Laws (honorary), The University of Manitoba
- 1992: Distinguished Service Award, Manitoba Bar Association
- 1993: Doctor of Canon Law (honorary), St. John's College
- 1999: Citizen of the Year Award, The St. Andrew's Society of Winnipeg
- 2006: 87th Honorary Life Member, The Manitoba Club
- Life Bencher of The Law Society of Manitoba
