= Irwin Dorfman =

Canadian lawyer (1908–1993)

Irwin Dorfman QC

47th President of the Canadian Bar Association
- In office 1975–1976
- Preceded by: William Lorne Northmore Somerville
- Succeeded by: A. Boyd Ferris

President of the Law Society of Manitoba
- In office 1971–1972

Personal details
- Born: March 27, 1908 Winnipeg, Manitoba, Canada
- Died: November 9, 1993 (aged 85) Winnipeg, Manitoba, Canada
- Education: University of Manitoba (BA, LL.B)
- Profession: Lawyer

Irwin Dorfman, QC, (March 27, 1908 – November 9, 1993) was a Canadian lawyer from Winnipeg, Manitoba, eventually becoming senior counsel with the firm of Thompson Dorfman Sweatman. In addition to a busy legal practice in the areas of taxation and corporate matters, he was active in his community and in the profession. He served as president of the Law Society of Manitoba and as the national president of the Canadian Bar Association, the first Jewish president in the Association's history.

== Early life ==
Born in Winnipeg in 1908, Dorfman was the son of Moses and Dora Dorfman. He attended St John's Technical High School and then the University of Manitoba, graduating in 1927 with a Bachelor of Arts degree. He followed that with a Bachelor of Laws degree from the Manitoba Law School in 1931, graduating with the gold medal for his class.

== Practice of law ==
Dorfman articled with the Winnipeg firm of Sparling and Sparling, and then entered into a partnership with Abraham M. Shinbane. In 1966, he transferred to the firm of Thompson, Dilts, Jones, Hall, Dewar & Ritchie, which later was renamed Thompson Dorfman Sweatman. He practised there until his death. He also served as special counsel for the Federal Department of Justice.

Dorfman practised in the areas of corporate law and tax law, earning a reputation for extensive and precise knowledge of the law. In 1963, he chaired a review of Manitoba's corporations law, leading a group composed of thirteen prominent Manitoba lawyers, including Brian Dickson, future Chief Justice of Canada, and A. Lorne Campbell, who like Dorfman would go on to become national president of the Canadian Bar Association. Dorfman described the committee as giving "active and serious consideration" to the question of public protection within a streamlined, up-to-date Companies Act.

== Leadership in the legal profession ==
Dorfman served as president of the Manitoba Bar Association from 1965 to 1966. He was elected the president of the Law Society of Manitoba, serving from 1971 to 1972. He was elected the national president of the Canadian Bar Association for the years 1975 to 1976, the first Jew to serve in that office.

Dorfman was also a governor of the Canadian Tax Foundation, serving for three years, and a trustee of the Foundation for Legal Research.

As a member of the Canadian Bar Association, in 1973 Dorfman was credited with introducing a CBA resolution calling on the federal government to protect the privacy of taxpayers' personal information. That resolution influenced the federal government to implement privacy protections for tax data. The resolution stated: "It is a fundamental principle of Canadian law that no person should be compelled other than on a privileged basis, to provide evidence against himself except in specifically defined circumstances."

As president of the CBA, one of the issues which Dorfman had to address was compliance by lawyers with the federal regulations of professional income under the Anti-Inflation Act, enacted by the federal Parliament in 1975. Dorfman and William Cox, the president of the Federation of Law Societies of Canada, met with the federal Justice Minister, Ron Basford, to discuss the issue. Dorfman advised that the CBA would urge its members to comply with the Act, consistent with the ethical requirements set out in the codes of conduct of the law societies. He said: "Lawyers more than anyone else should be concerned about upholding the law." He added that if the federal Anti-inflation Board found that an individual lawyer was not complying with the Act, that would be a matter for discipline by the relevant provincial law society.

== Community service ==
Dorfman was active in his community his entire life, particularly the Jewish community in Winnipeg. He was an executive member of the Young Men's Hebrew Association and the President of the Winnipeg branch of B'nai B'rith. He was also a board member for the Shaarey Zedek Synagogue, and served a term as President of the Shaarey Zedek Brotherhood. In 1964, he was one of the founding incorporators of the Jewish Foundation of Manitoba, a non-profit corporation for charitable, educational, and cultural purposes.

During World War II, Dorfman was a director of the Trans-Migration Bureau of the Joint Distribution Committee in New York City, an organization dedicated to raising funds and assisting Jewish refugees to escape from Nazi-occupied portions of Europe. He later said that this work was one of the most significant events in his life. He also served on the Joint Distribution Committee of the Canadian Jewish Committee for Refugees, and helped to raise $30,000 for that group. He also helped raise funds for the Hebrew University of Jerusalem.

Dorfman was a member of the Young Men's Section of the Winnipeg Chamber of Commerce and served as co-chairman in 1950 of the legal division of the Community Chest (now the United Way). He was also on the board of the Royal Winnipeg Ballet.

== Death ==
Dorfman died on November 9, 1993, at the age of 85. He was still working at Thompson Dorfman Sweatman, and was said to have taken a file with him to hospital to work on the day he died.

== Honours and awards ==
- 1950 - appointed Queen's Counsel by the Government of Manitoba.
- 1972 - appointed a Life Bencher of the Law Society of Manitoba.
- 1977 - awarded the Queen Elizabeth II Silver Jubilee Medal by the Governor-General of Canada.
- 1977 - awarded the degree of Doctor of Laws (honoris causa) by the University of Manitoba.
