= Harinder =

Harinder is a given name. Notable people with the name include:

- Harinder Pal Singh Chandumajra (born 1980), Indian politician
- Harinder Singh Giani (born 1938), jurist at the bar of the Punjab and Haryana High Court at Chandigarh
- Harinder Singh Khalsa, Indian politician
- Harinder Malhi (born 1981), Canadian politician in Ontario, Canada
- Harinder Singh Mehboob (born 1937), Punjabi poet
- Harinder Jit Singh Rai (died 1984), nicknamed Pandit, Canadian field hockey forward
- Fred Harinder Singh Sandhu, appointed to the Provincial Court of Manitoba in 2003
- Harinder Pal Sandhu (born 1989), Indian professional squash player
- Harinder Singh Sekhon (born 1991), world record holder for the highest standing jump (one leg)
- Harinder Sidhu Australian career diplomat, High Commissioner of Australia to New Zealand
- Harinder Singh (Punjab politician) (1917–1972), Indian politician in Punjab
- Harinder Singh (general) PVSM, AVSM, YSM, SM, VSM, retired General Officer of the Indian Army
- Harinder Singh (Haryana politician), Indian politician from Haryana
- Harinder Takhar (born 1951), former politician in Ontario, Canada
