= Provincial Court of Manitoba =

Province of Manitoba court of justice

- Established: 1 January 1973
- Jurisdiction: Manitoba
- Composition method: Provincial government appointment upon recommendation by a judicial nominating committee
- Authorised by: The Provincial Court Act
- Appeals to: Manitoba Court of Appeal
- Website: manitobacourts.mb.ca/provincial-court/

Chief Judge
- Currently: Margaret I. Wiebe
- Since: 10 July 2016
- Lead position ends: 9 July 2023

Associate Chief Judge
- Currently: Anne Krahn
- Since: 9 September 2015
- Lead position ends: 8 September 2022

Associate Chief Judge
- Currently: Tracey M. Lord
- Since: 2 July 2019
- Lead position ends: 1 July 2026

The Provincial Court of Manitoba (French: Cour provinciale du Manitoba) is the lower trial court of the Province of Manitoba. It has mainly a criminal jurisdiction, as well as limited concurrent jurisdiction with the Court of King's Bench in matters of family law that originate outside of Winnipeg.

It also hears all Youth Court cases in the province; all matters subject to Provincial Offences Act, such as those under The Highway Traffic Act and The Liquor Control Act; presides over inquests under The Fatality Inquiries Act; and reviews alleged police misconduct under The Law Enforcement Review Act.

Over 95% of all criminal cases in Manitoba take place in the Provincial Court.

== Judges ==
=== Current judges ===
Judges of the Provincial Court are appointed by Order-in-Council of the Province of Manitoba upon the recommendation of a Judicial Advisory Committee, which is composed of the Chief Judge, four citizens appointed by the provincial government, the President of the Law Society of Manitoba, the President of the Manitoba Bar Association, and a representative of the Provincial Court judges.

Current justices, as of July 2024
Judge	Position	Date of Appointment	Court centre
Ryan Rolston	Chief Judge	Appointed Chief Judge of the Provincial Court from 10 July 2023 to 9 July 2030; Appointed a Judge of the Provincial Court on 17 December 2014	Winnipeg
Tracey M. Lord	Associate Chief Judge	Appointed Associate Chief Judge of the Provincial Court from 2 July 2019 to 1 July 2026; Appointed a Judge of the Provincial Court on 19 November 2008	Winnipeg
Donovan J. Dvorak	Associate Chief Judge	Appointed Associate Chief Judge of the Provincial Court from 19 January 2022 to 18 January 2029; Appointed a Judge of the Provincial Court on 27 February 2013	Winnipeg
Lee Ann M. Martin	Associate Chief Judge	Appointed Associate Chief Judge of the Provincial Court from 14 September 2022 to 13 September 2029; Appointed a Judge of the Provincial Court on 17 September 2007	The Pas
Marvin Garfinkel	Senior Judge	31 July 2014	Winnipeg
Brian G. Colli	Senior Judge	Designated a Senior Judge of the Provincial Court on 2 July 2014; Appointed a Judge of the Provincial Court on 21 September 1994	Thompson
Heather R. Pullan	Judge	Appointed a Judge of the Provincial Court on 21 December 1994	Winnipeg
Brent Stewart	Senior Judge	Designated a Senior Judge of the Provincial Court on 9 June 2020; Appointed a Judge of the Provincial Court on 15 April 1998	Winnipeg
Raymond E. Wyant	Senior Judge	Designated a Senior Judge of the Provincial Court on 16 September 2014; Appointed Chief Judge of the Provincial Court from 10 July 2002 to 9 July 2009; Appointed a Judge of the Provincial Court on 20 May 1998	Winnipeg
Sidney B. Lerner	Judge	Designated a Senior Judge of the Provincial Court on 16 December 2022; Appointed a Judge of the Provincial Court on 4 August 1999	Winnipeg
Mary Kate Harvie	Judge	Appointed Associate Chief Judge of the Provincial Court from 18 September 2002 to 17 September 2009; Appointed a Judge of the Provincial Court on 26 July 2000	Winnipeg
Murray Thompson	Judge	Designated a Senior Judge of the Provincial Court on 2 May 2024; Appointed Associate Chief Judge of the Provincial Court from 2 August 2006 to 1 August 2013; Appointed a Judge of the Provincial Court on 26 March 2003	Winnipeg
John Combs	Senior Judge	Designated a Senior Judge of the Provincial Court on 4 March 2021; Appointed a Judge of the Provincial Court on 26 March 2003	Brandon
Kelly Moar	Judge	Appointed a Judge of the Provincial Court on 13 April 2005	Winnipeg
Robin Finlayson	Senior Judge	Designated a Senior Judge of the Provincial Court on 23 August 2018; Appointed a Judge of the Provincial Court on 31 January 2006	Winnipeg
Catherine Carlson	Judge	Appointed a Judge of the Provincial Court on 22 November 2006	Winnipeg
Doreen Redhead	Judge	Appointed a Judge of the Provincial Court on 4 April 2007	Thompson
Jean McBride	Judge	Appointed a Judge of the Provincial Court on 18 June 2008	Portage la Prairie
Wanda M. Garreck	Judge	Appointed a Judge of the Provincial Court on 19 November 2008	Winnipeg
Shauna Hewitt-Michta	Judge	Appointed Associate Chief Judge of the Provincial Court from 2 August 2013 to 1 August 2020; Appointed a Judge of the Provincial Court on 29 January 2009	Brandon
Herbert Lawrence Allen	Judge	Appointed a Judge of the Provincial Court on 29 January 2009	Winnipeg
Sandra L. Chapman	Judge	Designated a Senior Judge of the Provincial Court on 3 February 2023; Appointed a Judge of the Provincial Court on 4 August 2009	Winnipeg
Robert M. Heinrichs	Judge	Designated a Senior Judge of the Provincial Court on 9 August 2022; Appointed a Judge of the Provincial Court on 1 September 2009	Winnipeg
Malcolm W. McDonald	Senior Judge	Designated a Senior Judge of the Provincial Court on 10 March 2022; Appointed Associate Chief Judge of the Provincial Court from 1 August 2020 to 4 January 2022; Appointed a Judge of the Provincial Court on 3 February 2010	
Dale C. Schille	Senior Judge	Designated a Senior Judge of the Provincial Court on 23 March 2021; Appointed a Judge of the Provincial Court on 19 May 2010	Winnipeg
Donald R. Slough	Senior Judge	Designated a Senior Judge of the Provincial Court on 7 February 2020; Appointed a Judge of the Provincial Court on 28 July 2010	Winnipeg
Cynthia A. Devine	Judge	Appointed a Judge of the Provincial Court on 23 July 2012	Winnipeg
Timothy J. P. Killeen	Judge	Designated a Senior Judge of the Provincial Court on 9 November 2021; Appointed a Judge of the Provincial Court on 23 July 2012	Winnipeg
Margaret I. Wiebe	Judge	Appointed Chief Judge of the Provincial Court from 10 July 2016 to 9 July 2023; Appointed a Judge of the Provincial Court on 12 December 2012	Winnipeg
Anne Krahn	Judge	Appointed Associate Chief Judge of the Provincial Court from 9 September 2015 to 8 September 2022; Appointed a Judge of the Provincial Court on 5 June 2013	Winnipeg
Dale Harvey	Senior Judge	Designated a Senior Judge of the Provincial Court on 6 November 2020; Appointed a Judge of the Provincial Court on 10 July 2013	Winnipeg
Catherine Hembroff	Judge	Appointed a Judge of the Provincial Court on 16 July 2014	Thompson
Lindy Choy	Judge	Appointed a Judge of the Provincial Court on 29 April 2015	Winnipeg
Kael McKenzie	Judge	Appointed a Judge of the Provincial Court on 17 December 2015	Winnipeg
Todd Allen Rambow	Judge	Appointed a Judge of the Provincial Court on 7 December 2016	Thompson
Julie Frederickson	Judge	Appointed a Judge of the Provincial Court on 13 February 2018	Winnipeg
Kusham Sharma	Judge	Appointed a Judge of the Provincial Court on 13 February 2018	Winnipeg
Keith Eyrikson	Judge	Appointed a Judge of the Provincial Court on 6 March 2019	Winnipeg
Victoria Cornick	Judge	Appointed a Judge of the Provincial Court on 7 August 2019	Winnipeg
Antonio (Tony) Cellitti	Judge	Appointed a Judge of the Provincial Court on 7 August 2019	Winnipeg
Stacy Cawley	Judge	Appointed a Judge of the Provincial Court on 21 November 2019	Winnipeg
Geoffrey H. Bayly	Judge	Appointed a Judge of the Provincial Court on 19 February 2020	Dauphin
Christina L. Cheater	Judge	Appointed a Judge of the Provincial Court on 19 February 2020	Dauphin
Cindy Sholdice	Judge	Appointed a Judge of the Provincial Court on 30 September 2020	Winnipeg
Samuel Raposo	Judge	Appointed a Judge of the Provincial Court on 30 September 2020	Winnipeg
Dave Mann	Judge	Appointed a Judge of the Provincial Court on 28 October 2020	Winnipeg
Patrick Sullivan	Judge	Appointed a Judge of the Provincial Court on 4 February 2021	Brandon
Michael Clark	Judge	Appointed a Judge of the Provincial Court on 17 November 2021	Winnipeg
Rachel Rusin	Judge	Appointed a Judge of the Provincial Court on 17 November 2021	Winnipeg
Vincent Sinclair	Judge	Appointed a Judge of the Provincial Court on 10 March 2022	Winnipeg
Curtis Briscoe	Judge	Appointed a Judge of the Provincial Court on 23 March 2022	Winnipeg
Lori Hunter	Judge	Appointed a Judge of the Provincial Court on 5 April 2023	Winnipeg
David Ireland	Judge	Appointed a Judge of the Provincial Court on 8 June 2023	Winnipeg
Mark Kantor	Judge	Appointed a Judge of the Provincial Court on 8 June 2023	Brandon
Denis Guénette	Judge	Appointed a Judge of the Provincial Court on 30 August 2023	Winnipeg
Michelle Bright	Judge	Appointed a Judge of the Provincial Court on 30 August 2023	Winnipeg
Darcie Yale	Judge	Appointed a Judge of the Provincial Court on 1 September 2023	The Pas

=== Former judges ===
Name	Appointment/duration	Judicial centre	Appointed by	Previous position(s)
Judith Webster	1988–2006 (Chief Judge: 1993–2001)	Winnipeg	PC	
Howard Collerman	1 July 1975 – 4 January 2008	Winnipeg	NDP	
Theodore J. Lismer	17 January 1977 – 31 July 2017	Winnipeg	NDP	Private practice (1954 to 1977)
Ronald J. Meyers	1 November 1977 – 4 January 2010	Winnipeg	PC	
Marvin F. Garfinkel	5 December 1979 – June 2014	Winnipeg	PC	
Charles K. Newcombe	1 February 1980 – 2008	Winnipeg	PC	
Susan V. Devine	4 March 1988 – 1 September 2010	Winnipeg	NDP	
Linda M. Giesbrecht	4 March 1988 – 2010	Winnipeg	NDP	
Richard W. Thompson	28 January 1987	Dauphin	NDP	
Brian M. Corrin	4 March 1988	Winnipeg	NDP	
John P. Guy	15 May 1989	Winnipeg	PC	
Roger J. C. Gregoire	16 January 1991	The Pas	PC	
Krystyna D. Tarwid	6 July 1994	Brandon	PC	
Robert G. Cummings	28 September 1994	Portage la Prairie	PC	
Fred H. Sandhu	30 April 2003	Winnipeg	NDP	
Kenneth Champagne	13 April 2005	Winnipeg	NDP	
Christine Harapiak	13 April 2005	Dauphin	NDP	
Janice leMaistre	23 November 2006	Winnipeg	NDP	
Rodney Garson	15 December 2006	Winnipeg	NDP	
Patti-Anne L. Umpherville	17 September 2007	Winnipeg	NDP	
Carena Roller	17 September 2007	Winnipeg	NDP	
Michel L.J. Chartier	17 September 2007	Winnipeg	NDP	

== Judicial Justices of the Peace ==
Judicial Justices of the Peace conduct trials; conduct sentencing hearings under The Provincial Offences Act, including matters relating to the Highway Traffic Act; conduct hearings regarding protection orders under The Domestic Violence and Stalking Act; consider the issuance of search warrants and production orders; and consider applications for judicial interim release.

Judicial Justices of the Peace are appointed by the Lieutenant Governor in Council upon the recommendation of a nominating committee.

Judicial Justices of the Peace, as of October 2020
Judicial Justice of the Peace	Date of Appointment	Court Centre
Darlene Baker (Administrative Judicial Justice of the Peace)	Appointed Administrative Judicial Justice of the Peace of the Provincial Court from 18 January 2023 to 17 January 2028; Appointed a Judicial Justice of the Peace of the Provincial Court on 21 November 2018	Winnipeg
Dennis M. Chambers (Senior JJP)	17 May 2006; 19 July 2018 (Senior Judicial Justice of the Peach)	Selkirk
Judeta A. Cohn	Appointed a Judicial Justice of the Peace of the Provincial Court on 17 May 2006	Winnipeg
Angela H. Moyer Kintop	Appointed a Judicial Justice of the Peace of the Provincial Court on 17 May 2006	Selkirk
Myriam P. Rosset (Senior JJP)	Designated as a Senior Judicial Justice of the Peace of the Provincial Court of Manitoba, effective 23 June 2020; Appointed a Judicial Justice of the Peace of the Provincial Court on 17 May 2006	Winnipeg
Leslee M. Verhelst	Appointed a Judicial Justice of the Peace of the Provincial Court on 17 May 2006	Brandon
Benji Harvey (Senior JJP)	Designated as a Senior Judicial Justice of the Peace of the Provincial Court of Manitoba, effective 11 October 2017; Appointed a Judicial Justice of the Peace of the Provincial Court on 17 May 2006	Winnipeg
Helen Ann Karr (Senior JJP)	Designated as a Senior Judicial Justice of the Peace of the Provincial Court of Manitoba, effective 19 October 2017; Appointed a Judicial Justice of the Peace of the Provincial Court on 17 May 2006	Winnipeg
Beverley Lorraine Scharikow (Senior JJP)	Designated as a Senior Judicial Justice of the Peace of the Provincial Court of Manitoba, effective 24 May 2018; Appointed a Judicial Justice of the Peace of the Provincial Court on 8 December 2010	Winnipeg
Monique C. Allard	Appointed a Judicial Justice of the Peace of the Provincial Court on 16 October 2013	Portage la Prairie
Alana Chabluk	Appointed a Judicial Justice of the Peace of the Provincial Court on 9 September 2014	Thompson
Nettie Cuthbert-Buchanan (Administrative JJP)	Appointed Administrative Judicial Justice of the Peace of the Provincial Court from 17 January 2018 to 16 January 2023; Appointed a Judicial Justice of the Peace of the Provincial Court on 17 December 2014	Winnipeg
Karen Oxenforth	Designated as a Senior Judicial Justice of the Peace of the Provincial Court of Manitoba, effective 3 June 2024; Appointed a Judicial Justice of the Peace of the Provincial Court on 17 December 2014	Winnipeg
Monique Navitka	Appointed a Judicial Justice of the Peace of the Provincial Court on 1 June 2016	Winnipeg
Roxanne Desrosiers	Appointed a Judicial Justice of the Peace of the Provincial Court on 22 February 2017	Winnipeg
Gregory Jowett	Appointed a Judicial Justice of the Peace of the Provincial Court on 22 February 2017	Winnipeg
Alicia Schnell	Appointed a Judicial Justice of the Peace of the Provincial Court on 22 February 2017	Winnipeg
Ashley-Dawn (A.D.) Zallack	Appointed a Judicial Justice of the Peace of the Provincial Court on 22 February 2017	Winnipeg
Shawna Goy	Appointed a Judicial Justice of the Peace of the Provincial Court on 5 April 2017	Winnipeg
Katrina Trask	Appointed a Judicial Justice of the Peace of the Provincial Court on 30 September 2020	Winnipeg
Edith Sexsmith	Appointed a Judicial Justice of the Peace of the Provincial Court on 19 January 2022	The pas
Amy Dubnick	Appointed a Judicial Justice of the Peace of the Provincial Court on 9 June 2022	Brandon
Dana Young	Appointed a Judicial Justice of the Peace of the Provincial Court on 14 September 2022	Portage la Prairie
Lee Rynar	Appointed a Judicial Justice of the Peace of the Provincial Court on 9 February 2023	Thompson
Monique Maynard	Appointed a Judicial Justice of the Peace of the Provincial Court on 24 May 2023	Winnipeg

== See also ==
- Provincial and territorial courts in Canada
