= James Aikins =

James Aikins may refer to:

- James Cox Aikins (1823–1904), the father, federal Member of Parliament, Senator, Lieutenant-Governor of Manitoba
- James Albert Manning Aikins (1851–1929), the son, leader of the Manitoba Conservative Party, Lieutenant Governor of Manitoba
