= University of Manitoba, Faculty of Law =

Public law school in Winnipeg, Manitoba, Canada

Coordinates: 49.81190°N 97.13081°W

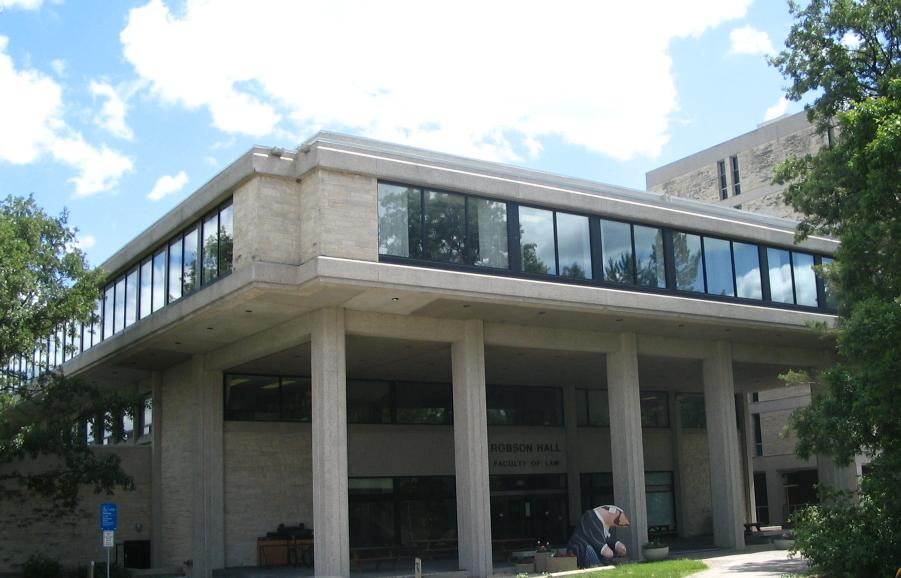
- Motto: Justice, Integrity, Excellence
- Type: Public law school
- Established: 1914
- Affiliations: AUCC, IAU, CIS, CVU, UArctic, ACU, CWUAA
- President: Michael Benarroch
- Dean: Richard Jochelson
- Faculty: 67
- Students: 306
- Location: Winnipeg, Manitoba, Canada
- Campus: Urban Fort Garry
- Website: umanitoba.ca/law/

The University of Manitoba, Faculty of Law is the law school located in Winnipeg, Manitoba, Canada. It is on the university's Fort Garry campus. The Faculty is located within the Robson Hall building, named after one of the two founders of the law school, Hugh Amos Robson.

== History ==
In 1914, Hugh Amos Robson, a judge on the Court of King's Bench in Manitoba, and Esten Kenneth Williams, a recent graduate of Osgoode Hall Law School, established the Manitoba Law School. The school was sponsored by the Law Society of Manitoba (LSM) and the University of Manitoba. In 1969, the school moved from the law courts in downtown Winnipeg to its current location. Prior to 1914, Manitoba lawyers usually studied at Osgoode Hall Law School in Toronto or law schools in Europe. In 1877, the LSM established an articling system and exam protocols with the goal of educating lawyers in Manitoba. In 1891, at the request of law students, the LSM established a set of lectures which included common law practice, criminal law, practice in criminal cases, and equity jurisprudence.

== Programs ==
University rankings

World rankings

Canadian rankings

Robson Hall currently offers J.D. (Juris Doctor), LL.M. (Master of Laws) and M.H.R. (Master of Human Rights) programs. The LL.M. program was brought into existence in 1949 by the Manitoba Law School and it was substantially revamped by the Faculty of Law in 1968. Robson Hall is known for its advocacy and clinical components, which include several required and optional courses in legal advocacy, negotiation, legal methods, judge shadowing, mooting, and intensive clinical opportunities throughout the degree program. It continues to enjoy a national reputation as a practice-oriented clinical school and as a scholarly centre of legal learning with a human rights and indigenous practice focus. The school has won over thirteen Western Canada Moot Trial Competitions, and routinely places at national moot competitions.

The Master of Human Rights (MHR) Program is the first graduate degree program in human rights in Canada. Launched in September 2019, this interdisciplinary program prepares students from various disciplinary backgrounds for careers in human rights advocacy. Housed within the Faculty of Law, the MHR program thrives through dynamic partnerships with the Faculties of Arts, Education, and Social Work, and is enriched by collaborations with leading centres such as the Centre for Human Rights Research, the Mauro Centre for Peace and Justice, and the National Centre for Truth and Reconciliation.

The Master of Human Rights (MHR) program offers two streams: Practicum and Thesis. The Practicum stream combines coursework with 300 hours of field experience at a human rights organization, culminating in a Major Research Paper that links practical experience with academic theory. The Thesis stream emphasizes original research and requires the completion and oral defense of a substantial academic thesis. Both streams involve 18 credit hours of coursework and are comparable in academic depth and rigour.

Robson Hall is home to the Marcel A. Desautels Centre for Private Enterprise and the Law. The Centre was formed with a mandate to "integrate the disciplines of law, business and the humanities as they apply to family-controlled and other private enterprises, the principal foundation of all economic activity in Canada." The Centre provides academic programs that allow students to be trained with the necessary skills to provide well-rounded legal representation and advice to a variety of private businesses.

In 1999, the Faculty of Law established the Asper Chair of International Business and Trade Law. The Asper Chair "sponsors a variety of research including bi-annual academic conferences in international business and trade law". The program features "an internship program allows up to four students a year to work with the Asper Chair and creates opportunities for students to advance their education, while gaining skills necessary to pursue careers in law or business with an international focus". Additionally, students involved in the Asper program "have the opportunity to participate in international commercial dispute resolution competitions".

Robson Hall is also home to the Legal Research Institute, funded by the Law Foundation of Manitoba, which awards research funding and grants to meritorious applicants engaged in various research projects vital to legal practice in Manitoba.

== Notable alumni ==
=== Justices of the Supreme Court of Canada ===
- Brian Dickson (15th Chief Justice of Canada)
- Marshall Rothstein (Puisne Justice of the Supreme Court of Canada)
- Albert Hudson (Puisne Justice of the Supreme Court of Canada)
- Charles Holland Locke (Puisne Justice of the Supreme Court of Canada)

=== Other notables ===
- Daniel Yanofsky (Canada's first chess grandmaster)
- Kimberly Prost (Canadian Judge at the International Criminal Tribunal for the former Yugoslavia and International Criminal Court)
- Stuart Garson (12th Premier of Manitoba, Canadian Minister of Justice and Attorney General)
- Howard Pawley (18th Premier of Manitoba)
- Sterling Lyon (17th Premier of Manitoba)
- Murray Sinclair (Chair of the Indian Residential Schools Truth and Reconciliation Commission and Senator for Manitoba)
- Sydney Halter (First commissioner of the Canadian Football League)
- Izzy Asper (Billionaire lawyer)
- Kael McKenzie (First transgender person ever appointed a judge in Canada)
- Irwin Dorfman (President of the Canadian Bar Association, the first Jewish president in the Association's history)
- Edward Pitblado (Olympic Hockey player and Ducks Unlimited Canada founder)
- Marcel A. Desautels (Lawyer, philanthropist)

== Notable professors ==
- David Asper (former Acting Dean, lawyer, businessman, philanthropist and recipient of the Queen Elizabeth II Diamond Jubilee Medal)
- Justice Gerald Heckman (Judge of the Federal Court of Appeal)
- Justice David Ireland (Judge of the provincial court of Manitoba)

== Notable sessional instructors ==
- Justice Charles Huband (Justice, Manitoba Court of Appeal [retired])
- Bruce MacFarlane, Q.C. (Professional in Residence & Crown Prosecutor, Manitoba Justice [retired])
- Judge Raymond E. Wyant (former Chief Judge of the Provincial Court of Manitoba, Canada)

== See also ==
- List of law schools in Canada
