= John MacAulay =

John Alexander MacAulay CC QC
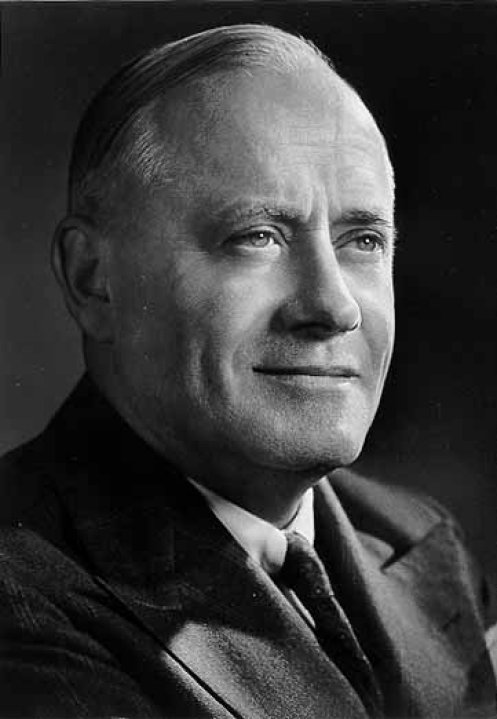
- Source: International Red Cross and Red Crescent

25th President of the Canadian Bar Association
- In office 1953–1954
- Preceded by: André Tashereau, c.r.
- Succeeded by: D. Park Jamieson, CM MBE QC

Chairman of the International League of Red Cross and Red Crescent Societies
- In office 1959–1965
- Preceded by: Emil Sandström
- Succeeded by: José Barroso Chávez

Personal details
- Born: May 29, 1892 Morden, Manitoba, Canada
- Died: November 6, 1978 (aged 86) Winnipeg, Manitoba, Canada
- Spouse: Phyllis Ardelle McPherson (m. 1928–1978)
- Children: 1 daughter, 1 son
- Education: University of Manitoba
- Profession: Lawyer

Military service
- Allegiance: Canada
- Branch/service: Canadian Expeditionary Force
- Rank: Sergeant Major
- Unit: Canadian Army Medical Corps

John Alexander MacAulay, CC QC (May 29, 1892 – November 6, 1978) was a Canadian lawyer, businessman, and community volunteer from Winnipeg, Manitoba. He was a member of the Canadian Red Cross Society, as well as the International Red Cross and Red Crescent Movement, eventually serving as the chairman of the Board of Governors of the International League of Red Cross and Red Crescent Societies. He was also involved with the Canadian Bar Association, and served a one-year term as the national president of the CBA. He was also Honorary Colonel of the Queen's Own Cameron Highlanders of Canada.

== Early life ==
MacAulay was born in Morden, Manitoba, one of the seven children of Finlay MacAulay (1842-1918) and Margaret MacDonald (1860-1930). He obtained his LL.B. from the University of Manitoba in 1918 while serving in the Canadian Medical Corps.

== Legal practice and business activities ==
Upon being called to the bar, MacAulay joined the Winnipeg law firm of Aikins, MacAulay & Thorvaldson. He eventually became partner in the firm, specializing in tax law. In 1931, his status in the profession was recognized by his appointment as King's Counsel by the Manitoba government.

MacAulay was also a businessman. He was a vice-president and director of the Bank of Montreal, and is credited with bringing the Safeway grocery chain to Canada. He was a vice-president of Safeway until his death.

== President of the Canadian Bar Association ==
MacAulay was active in the Canadian Bar Association. In 1953-54, he served as national president of the CBA. He was the third lawyer from Aikins MacAulay & Thovaldson to serve as national president, the previous two being Sir James Aikins (1914-1927) and Gordon Harold Aikins (1942-1943). A fourth lawyer from Aikins MacAulay & Thorvaldson, A. Lorne Campbell, would also be president (1970-1971).

== Red Cross work ==
MacAulay was a long-time volunteer with the Red Cross. During the Second World War, he was president of the Manitoba Red Cross, and from 1950 to 1951 he was president of the Canadian Red Cross Association.

In 1952, he chaired the 18th International Conference of the International Red Cross and Red Crescent Societies in Toronto, when tensions over the Korean War threatened to shatter the international association. His diplomatic handling of the situation, and response to the positions of opposing factions within the association, helped to preserve the unity of the International Red Cross and Red Crescent Movement.

From 1959 to 1965, he was chairman of the Board of Governors of the International Federation of Red Cross and Red Crescent Societies. During his tenure, the number of national societies rose from 88 to 106. He was chairman when the International Red Cross Committee and the League of Red Cross Societies received the Nobel Peace Prize in 1963.

== Personal interests ==
MacAulay was a member of Westminster United Church in Winnipeg. During the 1930s and 1940s, he taught one of the largest adult Bible classes in Canada.

An avid art collector, he was active with the Winnipeg Art Gallery (1950-1953) and the National Art Gallery of Canada (1955-1957). Part of his collection is now housed in the Winnipeg Art Gallery.

== Honours ==
- 1931 - appointed King's Counsel by the Manitoba government
- 1953 - awarded an honorary doctorate by the University of Manitoba
- 1967 - appointed a Companion of the Order of Canada, the highest Canadian civilian honour, for his services to the Red Cross at home and abroad.
- 1970 - awarded the Centennial Medal of Honour by the Manitoba Historical Society
- 1970 - awarded an honorary doctorate by the University of Winnipeg
- 1971 - appointed an Honorary Patron of the Canadian Foundation of the International College of Surgeons
- 1973 - awarded the Henry Dunant Medal, the highest honor the Red Cross can award, at the 22nd International Conference in Tehran. He was the first Canadian to receive this medal.
- Honorary life member of the St. Andrew's Society of Winnipeg.
