= James Albert Manning Aikins =

Canadian politician (1851–1929)

The Honourable Sir James Albert Manning Aikins KC
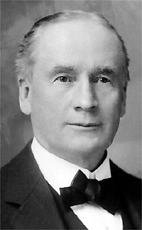
- Aikins in May 1913

9th Lieutenant Governor of Manitoba
- In office August 3, 1916 – October 9, 1926
- Monarch: George V
- Governors General: The Duke of Connaught and Strathearn; The Duke of Devonshire; The Lord Byng of Vimy; The Viscount Willingdon
- Premier: Tobias Norris; John Bracken
- Preceded by: Douglas Colin Cameron
- Succeeded by: Theodore Arthur Burrows

1st President of the Canadian Bar Association
- In office 1914–1927
- Succeeded by: J. E. Martin

Personal details
- Born: December 10, 1851 Grahamsville, Canada West
- Died: March 1, 1929 (aged 77) Winnipeg, Manitoba, Canada
- Parent: James Cox Aikins

Sir James Albert Manning Aikins KC (December 10, 1851 – March 1, 1929) was a politician in Manitoba, Canada. He was the leader of the Manitoba Conservative Party in the provincial election of 1915, and later served as the province's ninth Lieutenant Governor.

Aikins was born in Grahamsville, Toronto Gore Township, Peel County, Canada West (now Mississauga, Ontario) and educated at Toronto's Upper Canada College. His father, James Cox Aikins, was a prominent Canadian politician, serving as a cabinet minister from 1869 to 1873 and 1878 to 1882, and serving as Manitoba's Lieutenant-Governor between 1882 and 1888.

The younger Aikins was educated at Upper Canada College and the University of Toronto, receiving his B.A. in 1875. He subsequently moved to Winnipeg with his father, and remained in the western city after the elder Aikins returned to Ontario.

From 1879 to 1896, Aikins was counsel with the federal Department of Justice. In 1880, he was part of a committee that investigated the administration of justice in the North-West Territories. Aikins was appointed counsel to the Manitoba government in 1900, and was responsible for drafting the Temperance Act passed by the government of Hugh John Macdonald. He also served as president of the Law Society of Manitoba, and was a solicitor for the Canadian Pacific Railway from 1881 to 1911.

In the 1911 federal election, Aikins was elected as a Conservative candidate to the House of Commons of Canada, for the riding of Brandon. The Conservative Party won this election, and Aikins served as a backbench supporter of Robert Borden's administration.

Aikins left federal politics in 1915, amid unexpected circumstances. The provincial Conservative government of Rodmond Roblin was forced to resign amid scandal in May 1915. Aikins served as chair of the provincial party's convention in July, and accepted the position of party leader on July 15 when no other candidates came forward. He resigned his federal seat, and led the provincial party into a new election.

The new Liberal government of Tobias Norris was extremely popular, and portrayed Aikins as the tool of more sinister figures in the Conservative Party. The Liberals won 40 seats in the election, against only five for the Tories. Aikins was resoundingly defeated in Brandon City.

The following year, Aikins was appointed Lieutenant Governor of Manitoba on the recommendation of Prime Minister Robert Borden. He served in this largely ceremonial position from August 5, 1916, to October 25, 1926. Although his initial appointment was greeted with skepticism, Aikins proved to be a popular office-holder. Even the pro-Liberal Winnipeg Free Press approved of the continuance of his appointment on the recommendation of Prime Minister Arthur Meighen in 1921.

Aikins gave the Norris government permission to continue in office for a few weeks after losing a vote of confidence in 1922, such that important legislation could be passed before the next election.

Aikins was the first president of the Canadian Bar Association, holding that office for 13 years. He was the first of five lawyers from the Aikins firm to serve as president of the CBA, the others being his son Gordon Harold Aikins (1942–1943), John MacAulay (1953–1954), A. Lorne Campbell (1970–1971), and Guy Joubert (2008-2009).

Aikins died on March 1, 1929.

Parliament of Canada
Preceded by Clifford Sifton	Member of Parliament for Brandon; 1911-1915	Succeeded by Howard Primrose Whidden
