= Hélène De Kovachich =

Hélène De Kovachich is a Canadian lawyer, mediator, and former administrative judge known for her extensive work in alternative dispute resolution (ADR).

== Education ==
De Kovachich graduated from the University of Montreal with a degree in law. She began her career practicing tax law in both private and governmental sectors.

== Career ==
De Kovachich founded Groupe Option Médiation, focusing on civil, commercial, workplace and corporate mediation. She co-authored the “Guide pratique de la médiation”, a reference work in mediation training and practice. Her ADR practice extended to countries including the United States, United Kingdom, France, Mali, Mexico, Cambodia, Morocco, and Haiti. She played a significant role in the adoption of Canada's uniform law on international commercial mediation, influenced by UNCITRAL principles.

As president of the ADR section of the Canadian Bar Association and a founding member of Médiation sans frontières, she contributed to the development and implementation of dispute resolution conferences in judicial and administrative tribunals and to the training of judges in judicial mediation in Quebec, Canada, and internationally.

De Kovachich was appointed to the Tribunal administratif du Québec (TAQ). She served as president and chief judge of the TAQ, presiding over more than 1,000 mediations in various fields, including construction, expropriation, taxation, social affairs, and estates. She also intervened with the Autorité des marchés financiers and in preventive mediation. She was seconded by government decree to the Faculty of Law at the University of Montreal to establish and lead a mediation clinic. The clinic aims to promote access to justice and train students in mediation practices. She has been involved in implementing transitional justice systems in countries affected by conflicts and environmental disasters, notably in Haiti and Mali. She is a Distinguished Fellow of the International Academy of Mediators and has participated in numerous conferences and training sessions on ADR processes.
