= Kael McKenzie =

Canadian judge (born 1971)

Kael McKenzie (born 1971) is a Canadian judge, who was appointed to the Provincial Court of Manitoba on December 17, 2015. He is noted as the first transgender person ever appointed as judge in Canada.

A 2006 graduate of the University of Manitoba, McKenzie has worked as a lawyer, both in private practice with the Winnipeg firm of Chapman Goddard Kagan and as a Crown prosecutor in family, commercial and civil law. He co-chaired the Canadian Bar Association's Sexual Orientation and Gender Identity Conference from 2012 to 2014, and has served as vice president of the Manitoba Bar Association, as Manitoba chair of the Canadian Bar Association, and president of the provincial Rainbow Resource Centre for Manitoba's LGBT and two-spirit communities. He served for several years in the Canadian Forces before attending law school. Outside of his legal work, he has also been a volunteer for the Winnipeg Folk Festival, the St. James Historical Museum and the North American Indigenous Games.

He is a member of the Manitoba Métis Nation.
