= William Lorne Northmore Somerville =

Canadian lawyer and president of the Canadian Bar Association

William Lorne Northmore Somerville Q.C.

46th President of the Canadian Bar Association
- In office 1974–1975
- Preceded by: Neil McKelvey, Q.C.
- Succeeded by: Irwin Dorfman, Q.C.

Personal details
- Born: August 24, 1921 Ottawa, Ontario, Canada
- Died: June 10, 2009 (aged 87) Toronto, Ontario, Canada
- Spouse: Mary
- Children: Nanci, Sarah, Bill, David and Frederick
- Education: Trinity College, University of Toronto; Osgoode Hall Law School
- Profession: Lawyer

Military service
- Branch/service: Canadian Army
- Years of service: 1943–1946
- Rank: Lieutenant
- Unit: Royal Canadian Artillery; Royal Canadian Intelligence Corps; United States Military Intelligence Corps (secondment)

William Lorne Northmore Somerville, QC (August 24, 1921 – June 10, 2009), was a Canadian lawyer from Toronto, Ontario, Canada. He spent his career in private practice with the firm of Borden & Elliot, one of Canada's largest law firms (now Borden Ladner Gervais). For the last ten years of his career, he served as chairman of the firm. He also served as president of the Canadian Bar Association from 1974 to 1975.

== Early life and family ==
Somerville was born in Ottawa, Ontario, on August 24, 1921. His parents were William Lorne and Olive Triscott Somerville, and he had one brother, John.

He and his first wife had five children: Nanci, Sarah, Bill, David and Frederick. He married his second wife, Mary, in 1988.

Somerville was a lifelong member of the Church of England in Canada (now the Anglican Church of Canada). He was a Church Warden of the Cathedral Church of St. James in Toronto from 1977 to 1980.

== Education ==
Somerville attended the Collingwood Collegiate Institute in Collingwood, Ontario, graduating in 1939. He then attended Trinity College at the University of Toronto, graduating with a Bachelor of Arts in 1943. He interrupted his education to serve in the Canadian Armed Forces during World War II. Upon his return to Canada, he studied law at Osgoode Hall Law School, graduating with a Bachelor of Laws in 1948.

== Military career ==
After graduating from Trinity College in 1943, during World War II, Somerville volunteered for the Canadian Armed Forces. He was commissioned as a lieutenant in the Canadian Army, initially posted to the Royal Canadian Artillery. He was later transferred to the Royal Canadian Intelligence Corps. In 1944 he was seconded to the United States Army and assigned to the United States Military Intelligence Corps in Washington, D.C. He went through an intensive course to learn Japanese and served with the United States Army as part of the occupation forces in Japan. He returned to Canada in 1946.

== Legal career ==
Somerville articled with the firm of Fennell McLean & Davis. He eventually joined the firm of Borden & Elliott, where he stayed for the rest of legal career. He made partner in 1956, and was chairman of the firm from 1980 to 1990. Upon retiring in 1992, the firm made him Chairman Emeritus of their Toronto office.

Somerville developed a strong reputation as a barrister, including arguing several cases before the Supreme Court of Canada. He was also remembered by his colleagues at Borden & Elliott as a caring mentor to younger lawyers and a strong leader within the firm.

As well as his legal practice, Somerville was active in business and was a director of various corporations, including Eastern Utilities Ltd., and Hilti (Canada). He was chairman of the Canadian board of Norwich Union Life Insurance Company from 1970 to 1993. He was also a member of the Corporation of Trinity College from 1955 to 1995.

== Professional bodies ==
In addition to his legal practice, Somerville was active in a number of professional associations. He was a member of the Canadian Bar Association, serving as president of the Ontario Bar Association from 1969 to 1970, and as national president from 1974 to 1975. In addition to being a founding member of the Advocates' Society of Ontario, he was also a member of the International Association of Defense Counsel and the American Bar Association. He was a Fellow of the American College of Trial Lawyers, including being chairman of the College's Canadian-U.S. Committee in 1988. He was also a Governor of the Canadian Institute for Advanced Legal Studies.

== Later life and death ==
Somerville died peacefully on June 10, 2009, after a long illness. He was survived by his wife, Mary, his five children, and several grandchildren, and predeceased by his brother John. His funeral service was held at the Cathedral Church of St. James on June 18, 2009.

== Honours ==
- 1960 - Appointed Queen's Counsel by the Province of Ontario.
- 1974 - Fellow of the American College of Trial Lawyers.
- 1992 - Appointed Chairman Emeritus of the Toronto office of Borden & Elliott.
