= Neil McKelvey =

Canadian lawyer (1925–2011)

Neil McKelvey OC CD QC

45th President of the Canadian Bar Association
- In office 1973–1974
- Preceded by: Louis-Philippe de Grandpré, Q.C.
- Succeeded by: W.L.N. Somerville, Q.C.

15th President of the New Brunswick Branch of the Canadian Bar Association
- In office January 1, 1962 – December 31, 1962
- Preceded by: Ralph St. J. Freeze, Q.C.
- Succeeded by: George T. Mitton, Q.C.

4th President of the International Bar Association
- In office 1978–1980

Personal details
- Born: May 1, 1925 Saint John, New Brunswick
- Died: September 10, 2011 (aged 86) Saint John, New Brunswick
- Spouse: Joan
- Children: Peter and Roger
- Education: Dalhousie Law School
- Profession: Lawyer

Military service
- Branch/service: Canadian Army
- Rank: Private (active service); Honorary Lieutenant Colonel of 3rd Field Artillery Regiment, Royal Canadian Artillery (1992 to 2009)
- Unit: Royal Canadian Artillery, 4th Field Artillery Regiment

Edward Neil McKelvey OC CD QC, (1925–2011) was a Canadian lawyer. He was actively involved in the legal profession and was one of the founders of Stewart McKelvey, the largest regional law firm in Atlantic Canada. McKelvey served as president of the Canadian Bar Association and then was the first Canadian to be president of the International Bar Association.

In 1986, McKelvey was appointed an Officer of the Order of Canada for his community service and contributions to the legal profession.

== Early life and family ==
McKelvey was born in Saint John, New Brunswick in 1925, the son of Fenwick and Margaret McKelvey.

In 1948, McKelvey married his wife, Joan. The couple were married for 63 years at the time of his death. They had two sons, Peter and Roger.

== Military career ==
McKelvey was a veteran of World War II. He joined the Royal Canadian Artillery in 1944, and shipped overseas a few months later with the 4th Field Regiment of the RCR. In 1945, he was in the Netherlands when the war ended. McKelvey later transferred to the Canadian occupation force in Germany, not returning home until 1946. He remained active with the military for the rest of his life, serving as the Honorary Lieutenant Colonel of the 3rd Field Artillery Regiment, Royal Canadian Artillery, from 1992 to 2009.

== Legal career ==
=== Legal education and law firms ===
After he returned to Canada, McKelvey attended Dalhousie Law School in Halifax, graduating with a degree of Bachelor of Laws in 1949. He was called to the Bar of New Brunswick in the same year, and began practising with the firm of Porter, Ritchie & Riley.

In 1955, McKelvey founded the firm of McKelvey Macaulay Machum. That firm later merged with several other firms in the Atlantic provinces in 1990 to become Stewart McKelvey Stirling Scales, now known simply as Stewart McKelvey, the largest regional firm in Atlantic Canada. McKelvey continued on in the new firm as senior partner and counsel.

McKelvey eventually served as a director on several corporate boards, including NB Power and Bell Canada/BCE Inc.

=== Litigation practice ===
McKelvey was recognised as a top litigator in New Brunswick, throwing himself into his court cases. He appeared more than twenty times in the Supreme Court of Canada. His last Supreme Court case, in 1990, was taken on a pro bono basis on behalf of a woman who lost the sight in one eye following a cataract surgery. McKelvey successfully argued that the evidence led at trial was sufficient to prove a legal claim of negligence. The decision remains a leading case on the burden of proof of causation in malpractice cases.

As a lawyer in the Maritimes, McKelvey appeared several times in cases involving shipping issues, such as an inquiry under the Canadian Shipping Act into the 1957 collision between the Saint John harbour boat and the freighter Fort Avalon. He also represented the Canadian Coast Guard before a Royal Commission inquiring into the grounding of an oil tanker, Arrow, in Chedabucto Bay, Nova Scotia, in 1970. The grounding resulted in the spill of 108,000 barrels of oil, leading to questions about the way the Coast Guard had responded to the environmental hazard. For many years, he was also counsel for the owners of the Irving Whale, an oil carrying barge that sank in the Gulf of St. Lawrence in 1970 and posed a potential environmental hazard.

In the early 1960s, McKelvey faced a decision about his career path, when his name was mentioned for a possible appointment to the New Brunswick Court of Queen's Bench. McKelvey turned down the appointment, preferring to remain a litigator. Years later, he explained his decision: “I had to choose whether I wanted to be a judge or to remain a lawyer; I concluded that the secluded life of the bench, listening to lawyers argue cases and then having to prepare a decision, was not for me.”

== Leader in bar associations ==
=== Saint John Law Society ===
In 1969, McKelvey served as President of the Saint John Law Society, the local organization for lawyers in Saint John.

=== Canadian Bar Association ===
McKelvey was involved in the Canadian Bar Association both provincially and nationally. In 1962, he was the president of the New Brunswick Branch of the CBA. A decade later, he serve as the national president of the Canadian Bar Association in 1973-1974. During his time in office, the CBA produced a model code of professional conduct. McKelvey was a strong believer in the value of solid ethics for lawyers, and toured the country to promote the new code.

He was a strong advocate for the role of lawyers in society: “Lawyers are the lubricants of society. Just as lubricants keep a machine functioning, lawyers minimize the frictions in society to keep it functioning.”

=== International Bar Association ===
McKelvey served as president of the International Bar Association in 1979-1980, the first Canadian to hold that post. The IBA is one of the leading international associations of lawyers and law societies. When he took the position, the IBA's finances were in a poor shape, but by the time he left, it was on a sound financial footing. One of his major concerns while with the IBA was defending the independence of the legal profession. He stated that lawyers must have the “… courage to disregard influences of third parties whose interests may differ from the client, even though those third parties may be in a position to bring strong pressure to bear, financial or otherwise, on the lawyer.”

=== Membership in bar associations ===
McKelvey was a Fellow of the American College of Trial Lawyers, the American Bar Association, the ADR Atlantic Institute, the American Arbitration Association and ADR Chambers Canada.

== Community service ==
McKelvey was very active in his community, serving on numerous community groups. At various times, he was Chairman of the Saint John Port Development Commission, Chairman of the Saint John Regional Hospital Foundation, Director of the Saint John Seafarers’ Mission, President of the Saint Patrick's Society of Saint John, Commodore of the Royal Kennebeccasis Yacht Club, a board member of the Imperial Theatre, and a member of the Board of Governors of Dalhousie University.

== Honours ==
- 1960 - Province of New Brunswick appointed McKelvey Queen's Counsel.
- 1980 - University of New Brunswick awarded McKelvey an honorary Doctor of Civil Laws degree.
- 1986 - McKelvey appointed an Officer of the Order of Canada, in recognition of his community service and service to the legal profession both in Canada and internationally.
- 1999 - The McKelvey Cup, the regional round of the Sopinka Cup for law schools in the Atlantic provinces, is named after McKelvey.
- 2012 - McKelvey posthumously inducted into the New Brunswick Business Hall of Fame.
- 2012 - Saint John Seafarers Mission renamed its annual fund-raising golf tournament the Neil McKelvey Memorial Golf Tournament.

== Works ==
McKelvey, E. Neil, I Chose Law: Memoirs of E. Neil McKelvey, OC, QC, (Saint John: E.N. McKelvey, 2001).
