= Wyant =

Wyant is a surname. Notable people with the surname include:

- Adam Martin Wyant (1869–1935), American politician
- Alexander Helwig Wyant (1836–1892), American landscape painter
- Andy Wyant (1867–1964), American football player
- Emily Kathryn Wyant (1897–1942), American mathematician
- Fred Wyant (1934–2021), American football quarterback
- Gordon Wyant, Canadian lawyer and politician
- James C. Wyant, American optical engineer, entrepreneur, and professor
- Raymond E. Wyant (fl. 1990s–2010s), Chief Judge of the Provincial Court of Manitoba, Canada
- Victoria Wyant (born 1999), English actress
