= Bruce MacFarlane =

Canadian lawyer and former civil servant

Deputy Minister of Justice and Deputy Attorney, Manitoba
- In office 1993-2005

Assistant Deputy Attorney General (Criminal Law)

Personal details
- Born: Winnipeg, Manitoba, Canada
- Education: University of Winnipeg; University of Manitoba; Canadian Centre for Management Development
- Occupation: Lawyer

Bruce A. MacFarlane (born in Winnipeg, Manitoba) is a Canadian lawyer, Crown prosecutor, legal scholar, and former federal and provincial Department of Justice official.

== Education ==
MacFarlane received his B.A. from the University of Winnipeg in 1970 and his LL.B in 1973 from the University of Manitoba. He also graduated from the Canadian Centre for Management Development in 1992.

== Career ==
MacFarlane was called to the bar in the provinces of Manitoba (1974), Saskatchewan (1979), and Alberta (1987), and was appointed Queen's Counsel by the Government of Canada in 1987. He has appeared at trial and on appeal in four provinces and in the Supreme Court of Canada. MacFarlane started his career in Winnipeg with the Federal Department of Justice prosecuting a wide variety of cases with a focus on drug conspiracies and white collar crime. Subsequently, he was appointed Director of Legal Services for the RCMP in Ottawa (1982), Director of Justice Canada in Alberta (1986) and finally Assistant Deputy Attorney General for Canada (1989) where he was responsible for all federal prosecutions across Canada. In 1993, he returned to his home province of Manitoba as Deputy Minister of Justice and Deputy Attorney General from 1993 to 2005. He was also appointed as Special Counsel to the Attorney General on Organized Crime and is currently a member of the Manitoba (1974) and Alberta Bars (1987). Presently, he is on temporary leave from Manitoba Justice to teach at the Robson Hall (Faculty of Law - University of Manitoba) as the Professional in Residence.

== Academics and other positions ==
MacFarlane has published numerous scholarly writings on criminal law topics, including a leading text entitled Drug Offences in Canada, now in its third edition.

He has also held a variety of different special positions throughout his career. He was appointed as head negotiator to broker an extradition treaty with Mexico. He is a founding member of the Heads of Prosecution Agencies in the Commonwealth and he was a Commissioner at the Uniform Law Conference of Canada. He was also member of the National Crime Prevention Council Co-Chair of the National Committee of Deputy Ministers of Justice in Canada. In 2003, he presented a major paper on wrongful convictions at the bi-annual meeting of the Heads of Prosecution Agencies in the Commonwealth at Darwin, Australia, and presented a revised version at the Ireland meeting in 2005. He also appeared as an expert witness in the Lamer Commission of Inquiry into Wrongful Convictions in Newfoundland in 2005. In 2007 he provided testimony as a witness at former Supreme Court Justice John C. Major Q.C.'s Air India Inquiry. Presently he is a Professional Affiliate, teaching criminal law at Robson Hall (Faculty of Law - University of Manitoba). He teaches classes entitled "Criminal Law and Procedure" and "Miscarriages of Justice".

Mr. MacFarlane is a regular contributor to the Criminal Law Quarterly, and has authored a number of articles on criminal law topics which have been published by the University of British Columbia, The University of Toronto, and the Canadian Bar Association. His writings have been cited and relied upon by Canadian appellate courts and, in one instance, by the High Court of Australia.

== Select publications ==
- Bruce A. MacFarlane. "Historical Development of the Offence of Rape" in Woods & Peck eds., 100 Years of the Criminal Code in Canada: Essays Commemorating the Centenary of the Criminal Code of Canada (Ottawa: Canadian Bar Association, 1993).
- Bruce A. MacFarlane, Robert J. Frater & Chantal Proulx. Drug Offences in Canada, 3d ed. (Aurora, ON: Canada Law Book, 1996).
- Bruce A. MacFarlane. "People Who Stalk People" (1997) 31 UBC L. Rev. 37.
- Bruce A. MacFarlane. "Sunlight and Disinfectants: Prosecutorial Accountability and Independence through Public Transparency" (2000) 45 Crim. L. Quarterly. 272.
- Bruce A. MacFarlane & Janet Reno. "Interview: Janet Reno on Wrongful Convictions" (2005-2006) 31 Man. L.J. 565.
- Bruce A. MacFarlane. "Convicting the Innocent: A Triple Failure of the Justice System" (2006) 31 Man. L.J. 403.
- Bruce A. MacFarlane. "Structural Aspects of Terrorist Mega-Trials: A Comparative Analysis" (2007) Prepared for the Commission of Inquiry into the Investigation of the Bombing of Air India Flight 182, The Honourable John C. Major, Commissioner.
- Bruce A. MacFarlane. "Wrongful Convictions: The Effect of Tunnel Vision and Predisposing Circumstances in the Criminal Justice System" (2008) Prepared for the Inquiry into Pediatric Forensic Pathology in Ontario, The Honourable Stephen T. Goudge, Commissioner.
