= Debra Parkes =

Canadian legal scholar

Academic background
- Education: Trinity Western University (BA); University of British Columbia (LLB); Columbia University (LLM)

Academic work
- Discipline: Law
- Sub-discipline: Canadian constitutional law Criminal law of Canada; Feminist legal theory
- Institutions: Robson Hall; Peter A. Allard School of Law

Debra Parkes is a Canadian academic working as the professor of law and chair in feminist legal studies at the Peter A. Allard School of Law, a position she assumed on July 1, 2016.

== Education ==
Parkes earned a Bachelor of Arts degree from Trinity Western University, a Bachelor of Laws from the University of British Columbia, and a Master of Laws from the Columbia Law School.

== Career ==
Parkes began her career as a law clerk for judges on the Supreme Court of British Columbia and as a litigator at Gowlings in Toronto. She also served as the associate dean of research and graduate studies and executive director of the Legal Research Institute at Robson Hall.

== See also ==
- Feminist legal theory
