= Brian Dickson =

Chief Justice of Canada from 1984 to 1990

The Right Honourable Brian Dickson PC CC CD

15th Chief Justice of Canada
- In office April 18, 1984 – June 30, 1990
- Nominated by: Pierre Trudeau
- Appointed by: Edward Schreyer
- Preceded by: Bora Laskin
- Succeeded by: Antonio Lamer

Puisne Justice of the Supreme Court of Canada
- In office March 26, 1973 – April 18, 1984
- Nominated by: Pierre Trudeau
- Preceded by: Emmett Hall
- Succeeded by: Gerald Le Dain

Justice of the Manitoba Court of Appeal
- In office 1967–1973
- Nominated by: Lester B. Pearson

Justice of the Manitoba Court of Queen's Bench
- In office 1963–1967

Personal details
- Born: Robert George Brian Dickson; May 25, 1916 Yorkton, Saskatchewan
- Died: October 17, 1998 (aged 82) Ottawa, Ontario
- Spouse(s): Barbara Dickson, née Sellers
- Education: University of Manitoba
- Profession: Lawyer
- Awards: Mentioned in Dispatches

Military service
- Allegiance: Canadian Army
- Branch/service: Royal Canadian Artillery
- Years of service: 1939-1945
- Rank: captain; honorary colonel, 30th Field Regiment, Royal Canadian Artillery
- Battles/wars: Battle of Normandy; Falaise Gap

Robert George Brian Dickson PC CC CD (May 25, 1916 – October 17, 1998) was a Canadian lawyer, military officer and judge who served as the 15th chief justice of Canada from 1984 to 1990 and as a puisne justice of the Supreme Court of Canada from 1973 to 1984. He retired on June 30, 1990.

Dickson's tenure as chief justice coincided with the first wave of cases under the new Canadian Charter of Rights and Freedoms which, established in 1982, reached the Supreme Court from 1984 onwards. Dickson wrote several highly influential judgments on the Charter and laid the groundwork for the approach that the courts would take to the Charter.

== Early life and family ==
Dickson was born to Thomas Dickson and Sarah Elizabeth Gibson, in Yorkton, Saskatchewan, in 1916, although the family lived at that time in Wynyard. His adolescence and young adulthood occurred during the Great Depression and the Dust Bowl years, which hit the Canadian prairies particularly hard.

Dickson's father was a bank manager, and the family was eventually transferred to Regina, the capital of Saskatchewan. Dickson attended high school at the Central Collegiate, where two of his classmates were William Lederman and Alexander "Sandy" MacPherson. All three would go into law, with Lederman becoming one of Canada's leading constitutional scholars and MacPherson becoming a justice of the Saskatchewan Court of Queen's Bench. In later years, Dickson would reminisce that "Bill was always first in our class, and Sandy and I were fighting for second and third".

Sandy MacPherson's father was M. A. MacPherson, the attorney general for Saskatchewan. When the legislature was sitting in the evenings, Dickson and Sandy MacPherson would come in the evenings to the Attorney General's office to do their homework, and then sit in the galleries of the Assembly and listen to the debates. Dickson said that his interest in the law was triggered by that experience.

The Dickson family later moved to Winnipeg, where Dickson attended the University of Manitoba after graduating from Ridley College in 1934. He was a member of the Zeta Psi fraternity. In 1938, Dickson graduated with a Bachelor of Laws, earning the gold medal for his class. His first permanent job was with the Great-West Life Assurance Company, where he worked in the investment section for two years.

It was in Winnipeg as a young law student that Dickson met his future wife, Barbara Sellers. They married in Winnipeg in 1943, when Dickson was back from Europe to attend military staff training in Kingston.

== Military career ==
Dickson was called to the bar in 1940, but before practising law, he enlisted in the Canadian armed forces for active service. He had joined the military reserve in 1939, on the outbreak of World War II. In June 1940, he and his friend from law school, Clarence Shepard, signed up for active duty as second lieutenants with the Royal Canadian Artillery, joining the 38th Field Battery in Winnipeg. In August 1940, he volunteered for overseas service.

Lieutenant Dickson sailed in February 1941 for Britain with the 3rd Light Anti-Aircraft Regiment. His abilities attracted notice and he was chosen for staff training, returning to Canada for a course in 1943, followed with a tour of duty in British Columbia as brigade major with the Royal Canadian Artillery. In 1944, Dickson volunteered to return to Europe as a captain. He was posted to the 2nd Canadian Army Group, Royal Canadian Artillery, and distinguished himself in Normandy, being mentioned in dispatches.

In August 1944, during the battle of Falaise Gap, Dickson was hit by friendly fire and severely wounded, leading to the amputation of his right leg. By coincidence, two of his friends, Bill Lederman and Clarence Shepard, were both serving in the area and witnessed the attack. They later remembered the frantic attempts to have the attack called off, not knowing at the time Dickson was in the target area. He was discharged from the army in April 1945.

Years later, when he came to Ottawa, Dickson renewed his ties to the military. In 1983, he accepted the honorary lieutenant-colonelship of the 30th Field Regiment, Royal Canadian Artillery, and was its honorary colonel from 1988 to 1992.

== Legal career ==
Dickson returned to Winnipeg in 1945 at the end of the war, joining the law firm of Aikins, Loftus, MacAulay, Turner, Thompson & Tritschler. He became a successful corporate lawyer, and also lectured at the Faculty of Law of the University of Manitoba for six years, until 1954. In 1963, he was on a volunteer committee of the Canadian Bar Association ("CBA") which assisted the Manitoba government in preparing a new Companies Act. Two other volunteers on the committee were Lorne Campbell and Irwin Dorfman, both of whom would later serve as national president of the CBA.

== Community involvement ==
In 1950, Dickson volunteered to be head of the Manitoba Red Cross, on the suggestion of a partner who told him it would only involve a few meetings per year. Instead, Dickson took the position just in time for the 1950 Red River flood, with the Red reaching the highest level since 1861. Winnipeg itself was inundated, 4 of 11 bridges were destroyed, and over 100,000 people had to be evacuated. Dickson took charge of the relief effort by the Red Cross, not seeing his law office for six weeks. Under his direction, the Red Cross mobilised 4,000 volunteers, evacuated thousands and provided support to the people working on the dykes. He later admitted he ran the Red Cross volunteers like an army.

Dickson also served as chancellor (legal advisor) for the Anglican Diocese of Rupert's Land.

== Judicial career ==
In 1963, Dickson was appointed to the Court of Queen's Bench of Manitoba and in 1967 was elevated to the Manitoba Court of Appeal. He was appointed a puisne justice of the Supreme Court of Canada on March 26, 1973. On April 18, 1984, he was elevated to chief justice of Canada over the more senior Roland Ritchie, who was one year away from mandatory retirement at age 75 and was in ill health.

During his early years on the Supreme Court, Dickson frequently joined with Justice Laskin and Justice Spence on cases involving civil liberties, often in dissent from the more conservative majority on the Court. The grouping was colloquially referred to as the "LSD connection".

Having come from a corporate law background, Dickson often contributed to the judgments in that field. He also developed a reputation as an important authority on constitutional law, originally relating to law of Canadian federalism and later, the groundwork for the new Canadian Charter of Rights and Freedoms.

Dickson participated in the 1981 Patriation Reference, which considered Prime Minister Pierre Trudeau's attempt to have the federal government unilaterally patriate the Constitution of Canada without the consent of the provinces. By a 7–2 division, a majority of the Court held that Parliament had the legal authority to act unilaterally. However, by a division of 6–3, the Court also held that unilateral federal action would violate a constitutional convention that had emerged since Confederation, requiring substantial provincial agreement on constitutional amendments. Dickson, along with the three judges from Quebec, was in the majority on both issues: he agreed that Parliament had the legal authority to act unilaterally, but also agreed that a constitutional convention required a substantive degree of provincial agreement for major constitutional amendments.

With the introduction of the Charter in 1982, Dickson made many major contributions to the early standards of interpretation. Among his most famous decisions was that of R v Oakes, where he proposed the analytical framework for section 1 of the Charter now known as the "Oakes test". In R v Big M Drug Mart Ltd, he gave a broad interpretation to the guarantee of freedom of religion set out in section 2 of the Charter, and in R v Morgentaler, he found that the restrictions on abortions set out in the Criminal Code violated a woman's security of person, contrary to section 7 of the Charter.

== Later life and death ==
Dickson served on the Supreme Court for 17 years before retiring on June 30, 1990. He died on October 17, 1998, at age 82.

== Honours ==
In 1990, Dickson was made a Companion of the Order of Canada. In addition to his military service and his ground-breaking judgments on the Charter, the citation mentions his Red Cross volunteerism and service in other humanitarian causes.

The Brian Dickson Law Library at the University of Ottawa is named for him. The library's reading room contains a full reproduction of his home office, artifacts and personal items representing his life.

== See also ==
- List of Supreme Court of Canada cases (Dickson Court)
- 1987 judgments of the Supreme Court of Canada
- 1988 judgments of the Supreme Court of Canada
- 1989 judgments of the Supreme Court of Canada
