= Patti-Anne Umpherville =

Patti-Anne Umpherville was appointed to the Provincial Court of Manitoba on September 17, 2007. She ceased to be a judge in August 2013.

Judge Umpherville graduated from the University of Saskatchewan in 1997 and practised solely in the area of criminal law. She is Cree, and was born on the Onion Lake Reserve in Saskatchewan. She articled at Legal Aid Manitoba, then practised as a defence attorney with the Winnipeg law firm of Phillips Aiello.

As a defence lawyer, she regularly attended northern communities for circuit courts, including Little Grand Rapids, Pauingassi and Gypsumville.

In 2003, she joined the Prosecutions Branch of the provincial justice department and worked as a Crown attorney in the domestic violence unit.
