= International Federation of Red Cross and Red Crescent Societies =

Humanitarian organization

- Formation: 5 May 1919; 107 years ago
- Founder: Henry Pomeroy Davison
- Type: Humanitarian aid organization
- Purpose: Carrying out relief operations to assist victims of disasters, combined with development work to strengthen the capacities of its member National Societies
- Headquarters: Geneva, Switzerland
- Coordinates: 46°13′40″N 6°8′14″E
- Region served: Worldwide
- President: Kate Forbes
- Secretary General: Jagan Chapagain
- Main organ: Governing board
- Parent organization: International Red Cross and Red Crescent Movement
- Budget: CHF 1 billion (2026)
- Employees: 2,500 (2022)
- Award: Nobel Peace Prize (1963)
- Website: www.ifrc.org

The International Federation of Red Cross and Red Crescent Societies (IFRC) is a worldwide humanitarian aid organization that reaches 160 million people each year through its 191 member National Societies. It acts before, during and after disasters and health emergencies to meet the needs and improve the lives of vulnerable people. It does so independently and with impartiality as to nationality, race, gender, religious beliefs, class and political opinions.

The IFRC is part of the International Red Cross and Red Crescent Movement along with the International Committee of the Red Cross (ICRC) and 191 National Societies. The IFRC's strength lies in its volunteer network, community-based expertise and independence and neutrality. It works to improve humanitarian standards, as partners in development and in response to disasters. It persuades decision makers to act in the interests of vulnerable people. It works to enable healthy and safe communities, reduce vulnerabilities, strengthen resilience and foster a culture of peace around the world.

== History ==
=== Founding ===
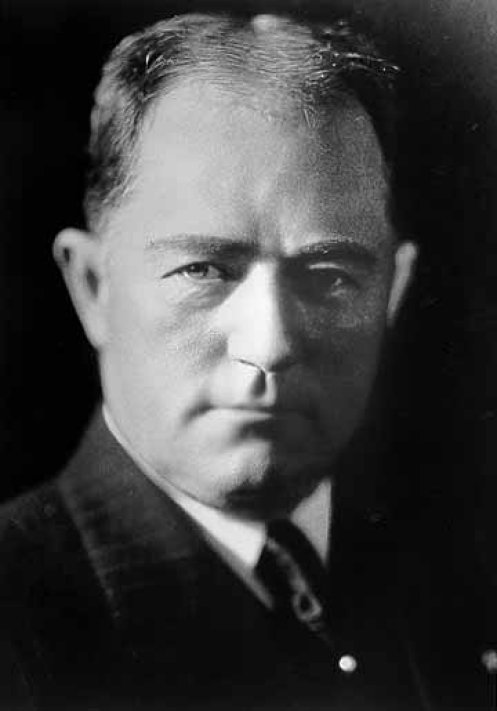
Henry Pomeroy Davison, a founding father of the League of Red Cross Societies

On 5 May 1919, following the First World War, representatives from the National Red Cross Societies of the Allied Powers (United Kingdom, France, Italy, Japan, and United States) came together in Paris to establish the League of Red Cross Societies (LORCS) whose stated goal was "to strengthen and unite, for health activities, already-existing Red Cross Societies and to promote the creation of new Societies". The initiative was taken by Henry P. Davison, then chairman of the American Red Cross' "War Committee", with the support of Woodrow Wilson, the president of the United States. Davison was assisted by the British general Sir David Henderson, who became the first Director-General. This newly created federation of National Societies expanded the international mandate of the Red Cross Movement beyond the strict mission of the International Committee of the Red Cross (ICRC) to include relief assistance in response to emergencies which were not caused by armed conflict. In addition to the coordination of relief operations caused by natural disasters and health emergencies, the league's mission was to assist National Societies in their founding and development, especially in peacetime.

In addition to providing assistance to victims of epidemics, natural disasters (earthquakes, floods and hurricanes) and famines, two other activities were developed during the first years of the league. One main activity was to promote health by preventing illnesses and developing the training of nurses and volunteers. The other activity was to create the Junior Red Cross within the National Societies, which introduced children and students to the Red Cross with various educational courses and involved them in practical relief activities.

The formation of the league, as an additional international Red Cross organization alongside the ICRC, was not without controversy. The ICRC had, to some extent, valid concerns about a possible rivalry between the two organizations. The foundation of the league was seen as an attempt to undermine the leadership position of the ICRC within the Movement and to gradually transfer tasks and competencies to a multilateral institution. As well, Davison did not want to include National Societies of the defeated powers, namely Germany, Austria, Hungary, Bulgaria and Turkey, which was contrary to the ICRC's principle of universality. Moreover, the league's beginnings were expeditious as it took 154 days between the approval of President Wilson and its incorporation. This hasty formation forced Davison to cut corners and leave unresolved issues such as a clear framework of the league's mandate, duties and funding.

The coexistence concerns between the league and the ICRC were discussed during three consecutive International Conferences of the Red Cross (1921, 1923, 1926). The statutes adopted in 1928 at the XIIIth International Conference of the Red Cross in The Hague clarified and confirmed the roles of each entity. In that same year, the "International Council" was founded to coordinate cooperation between the ICRC and the league, a task which was later taken over by the Standing Commission of the Red Cross and Red Crescent.

In 1920, the league's "General Council, originally composed of representatives of the victorious Allies", welcomed additional National Societies; 27 out of the 31 member societies were represented in 1920. In the following decade, the league admitted over 25 National Societies, including the Egyptian Red Crescent and the Red Lion and Sun of Iran. Following the adoption of the Statutes of the International Red Cross in 1928 (revised in 1952 and 1986, amended in 1995 and 2006), the National Societies of the Nordic Red Cross (Denmark, Finland, Sweden and Norway) returned to the league after resigning three years earlier because of the discords within the Red Cross movement. The Alliance of the Red Cross and Red Crescent Societies of the Soviet Union joined the league during the XVth International Conference in 1934. By the mid-1930s, the league became truly universal, with 58 registered National Societies.

=== Secretariat on the move ===
The league's headquarters, named the secretariat, was originally based in Geneva. The league moved its secretariat from Geneva to Paris in 1922 with a restrained budget and reduced staff. The need to move away from the ICRC to further develop the league's own identity was part of the decision-making. On September 5, 1939, days following the German troops invasion of Poland, the league personnel in Paris were moved to Geneva. The league believed it could ensure the continuity of its work from a neutral country such as Switzerland. To this day, the secretariat's offices have remained in Geneva, but it was only in 1959 that the secretariat moved into its current headquarters in Petit-Saconnex.

=== Missions begin ===
During the first years of the league, the work was essentially reactive and consisted mostly of recording information and statistics to be shared with the National Societies. The league's first operational mission was to perform onsite observations of the conditions of the victims of a typhus epidemic in Poland, and to develop and circulate information material to the surrounding countries to prevent the spread of similar epidemics. The first large-scale relief action of the league came after the 1923 earthquake in Japan which killed about 200,000 people and left countless more injured and without shelter. For the first time, 35 National Red Cross Societies participated in a joint action of the ICRC and the league, for which a record sum of 277 million Swiss francs was donated.

The league began issuing appeals in 1925 but appeals were not consistently issued for all disasters. During the 1920s and 1930s, disaster relief remained a minor activity, behind public health, nursing, and youth activities. The League of Red Cross Societies initiated the first international postgraduate courses for nurses in 1920, with the first course being public health nursing. This need for nurses trained in public health was prompted by the devastation caused by the First World War and the 1918 influenza pandemic. Nurses were identified by National Red Cross societies and nominated for attendance with between 15 and 20 nurses joining each cohort. The National Societies, with the league's assistance in the 1920s, were better prepared to deal with disaster relief and consequently less in need of external assistance. Additionally, the Great Depression caused economic insecurity worldwide, urging the league to dedicate more coverage to poverty programs.

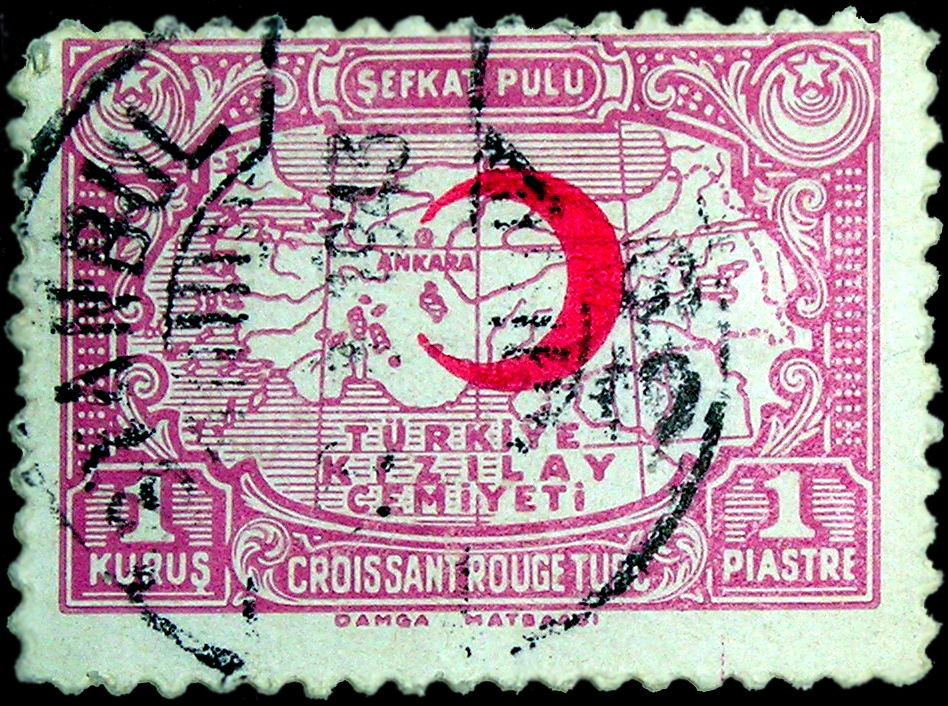
A stamp from Turkey to support the Red Crescent, 1938

The 1930s saw the growing use of the automobile, the development of road infrastructure and consequently the increase of traffic and casualties. The league became a leader in first aid prevention for road accidents, by establishing in 1932 a Permanent Committee on First Aid on Roads, with the collaboration of various motoring associations.

As the world headed closer to another war, the activities of the league reduced considerably. Nonetheless, the collaboration between the league and the ICRC continued to grow. The league provided support to the ICRC in the late 1930s, notably during the Spanish Civil War and the Second Sino-Japanese War, by issuing appeals and establishing distribution points of food and medical supplies for the civilians. The Joint Relief Commission, initiated by the ICRC in 1941, established the mandates of the league and the ICRC, ensuring their continuous support to the National Societies amid the intensifying war. This agreement also increased the National Societies' independence and allowed them to pursue their civilian relief activities without causing friction with the belligerent, occupied, and neutral states.

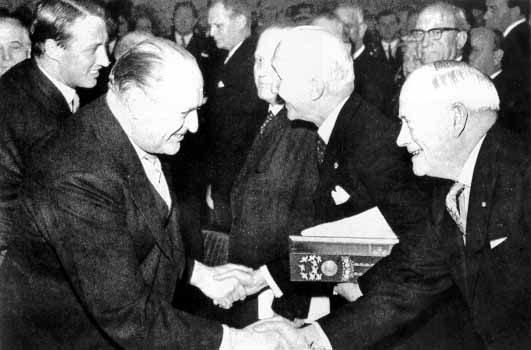
The Federation is honored at the Nobel Peace Prize ceremony in 1963. From left to right: King Olav of Norway, ICRC President Léopold Boissier, and League Chairman John MacAulay.

After a six-year hiatus, the board of governors held its first meeting in October 1945. The post-war period provided a new driving force to the league as it resumed its relations with the National Societies and provided relief to war-affected regions.

In December 1948 the League of Red Cross Societies was invited, along with the ICRC and AFSC, by the United Nations to take part in a $32 million emergency relief program working with Palestinian refugees. The League was given responsibility for Lebanon, Syria, and Jordan, and the American Friends Service Committee for the Gaza Strip.

Following disastrous weather conditions that afflicted parts of the world between 1951 and 1954, the league's relief activities became more operational and were no longer entirely informational. During those years, the league issued numerous appeals and showed great efficiency in disaster relief operations. In the late 1950s, there was a marked increase in the number of recognized Red Cross and Red Crescent National Societies due to decolonisation. By the end of the 1960s, there were more than 100 societies around the world. On December 10, 1963, the league and the ICRC jointly received the Nobel Peace Prize.

In 1983, the League of Red Cross Societies was renamed the "League of Red Cross and Red Crescent Societies" to reflect the growing number of National Societies operating under the Red Crescent symbol. Three years later, the seven fundamental principles of the Movement, as adopted at the XXth International Conference of the Red Cross in 1965, were incorporated into the league's statutes. The name of the league was changed again during the General Assembly of 1991 to its current official designation the "International Federation of Red Cross and Red Crescent Societies" (IFRC). In 1997, the ICRC and the IFRC signed the Seville Agreement, which further defined the responsibilities of both organisations within the Movement.

Until the beginning of the 1990s, all disaster relief operations were responded to as one Federation in a multilateral form. Donor red cross national societies were used to provide support through the Federation Secretariat, with money and human resources to support the Federation in the response to disasters under the coordination and leadership of the Federation Secretariat. The focus at that time was of one team, with a common mission, common goals in support of a sister red cross or red crescent society affected by a disaster.

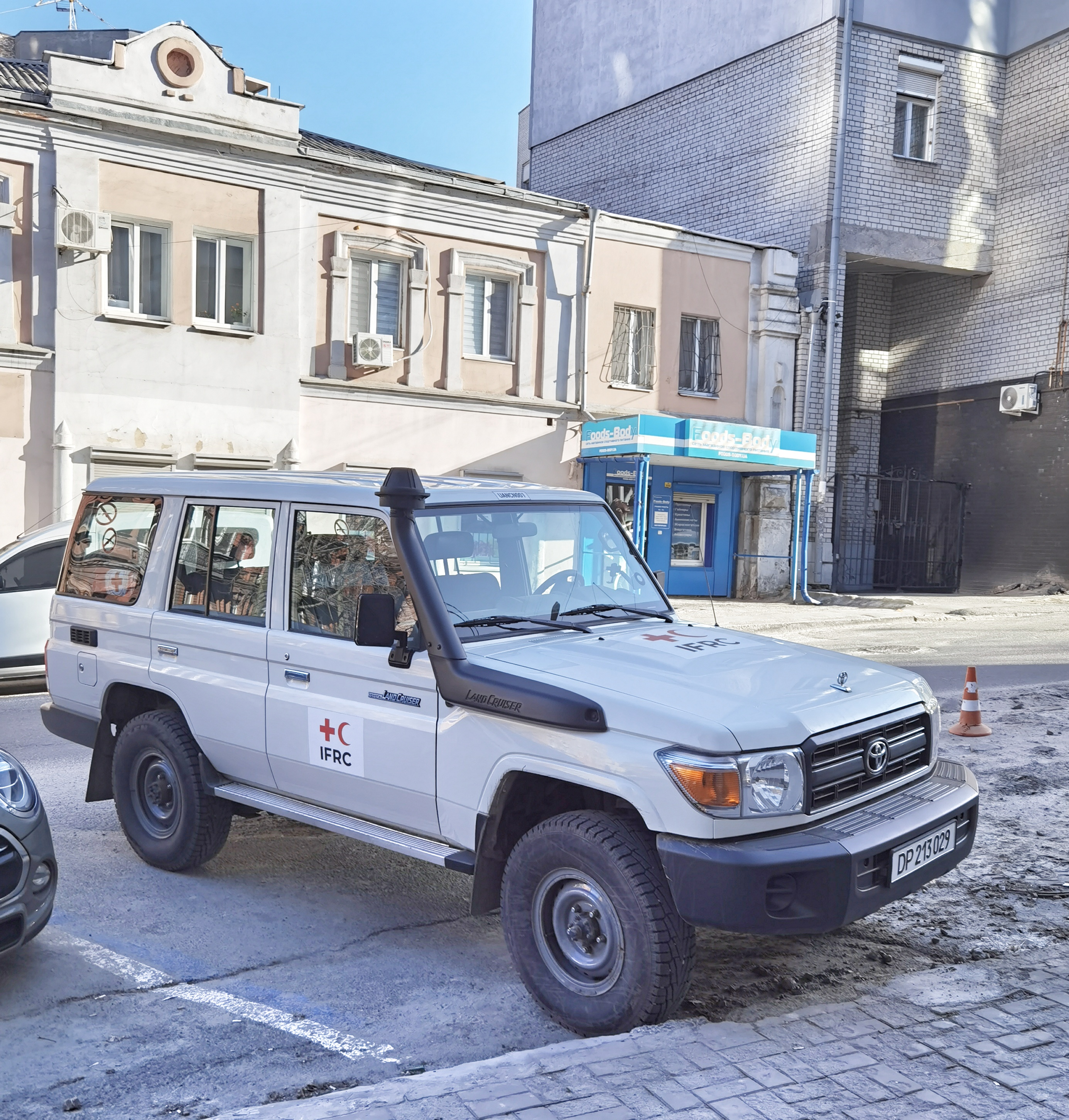
IFRC car in Dnipro, Ukraine during war

Hurricane Mitch affected few countries in Central America in 1998. The disaster relief efforts could be considered one of the disaster response operations that change the course of multilateralism within the membership of the International Federation. Since then, bilateralism become the new norm, and the reduce number of red cross from wealthy countries responding to disasters and expanding to development work continuously grow during the 2000s, including the growing number of red crescent societies operating internationally.

In 2004, the IFRC began its largest mission to date after the tsunami disaster in South Asia. More than 40 National Societies worked with more than 22,000 volunteers to bring relief to the countless victims left without food and shelter and endangered by the risk of epidemics.

== Activities and responsibilities ==
The IFRC coordinates between National Red Cross and Red Crescent Societies throughout the world. The IFRC along with ICRC supports the foundation of new National Societies in countries where no official society exists. A National Society is admitted as a member to the IFRC only after it is recognized by the ICRC. The IFRC cooperates with the National Societies of the affected countries (called the Host National Society (HNS)) as well as the National Societies of other countries willing to offer assistance (called Partner National Societies (PNS)). Among the 190 National Societies admitted to the General Assembly of the IFRC as full members or observers, about 25–30 regularly work as PNS in other countries. The most active are the American Red Cross, the British Red Cross, the German Red Cross, and the Red Cross Societies of Sweden and Norway. Another major mission of the IFRC which has gained attention in recent years is its commitment to work towards a codified, worldwide ban on the use of land mines and to bring medical, psychological, and social support for people injured by land mines.

The stated tasks of the IFRC can be summarized as follows:

- to promote humanitarian principles and values
- to support National Societies
- to support projects where funds are available

The Red Cross Red Crescent is the world's largest humanitarian network with:

- Nearly 18.3 million volunteers (2025)
- More than 473,000 paid staff
- More than 165,000 local Red Cross and Red Crescent units/ branches
- 19.4 million people having donated blood to National Society blood services worldwide
- More than 11 million people trained in First Aid by National Societies
- More than 106.5 million people reached by Long Term Services and Programme Development
- More than 49.5 million reached in 2016 by disaster response and early recovering programming
- A total income of more than 23.4 billion Swiss francs in 2016, with total expenditures being just over 23.1 billion Swiss francs

== Organization ==
The IFRC has its secretariat in Geneva and has five regional offices and numerous country and multi-country cluster offices around the world. The secretary general is Jagan Chapagain (Nepal). The IFRC is governed by a governing board consisting of a president, five vice presidents (one ex-officio), the chairman of the finance commission and representatives from 20 National Societies. The highest body of the IFRC is the General Assembly which convenes every two years with delegates from all National Societies. Among other tasks, the General Assembly elects the president. The current president of the IFRC is Kate Forbes (USA).

=== Presidents of the Federation ===
As of 2024, the president of the IFRC is Kate Forbes (USA). The vice presidents are: Mr. Bolaji Akpan Anani (Nigeria), Mr. Miguel Villarroel Sierraalta (Venezuela), Ms. Maha Barjas Al-Barjas (Kuwait) and Ms. Natia Loladze (Georgia). The fifth, ex-officio, vice president is Manuel Bessler (Switzerland).

Former presidents (until 1977 titled "Chairman") have been:

- 1919–1922: Henry Pomeroy Davison (American Red Cross)
- 1922–1935: John Barton Payne (American Red Cross)
- 1935–1938: Cary Travers Grayson (American Red Cross)
- 1938–1944: Norman Davis (American Red Cross)
- 1944–1945: Jean de Muralt (Swiss Red Cross)
- 1945–1950: Basil O'Connor (American Red Cross)
- 1950–1959: Emil Sandström (Swedish Red Cross)
- 1959–1965: John MacAulay (Canadian Red Cross)
- 1965–1977: José Barroso Chávez (Mexican Red Cross)
- 1977–1981: Adetunji Adefarasin (Nigerian Red Cross Society)
- 1981–1987: Enrique de la Mata (Spanish Red Cross)
- 1987–1997: Mario Enrique Villarroel Lander (Venezuela Red Cross)
- 1997–2001: Astrid Nøklebye Heiberg (Norwegian Red Cross)
- 2001–2009: Don Juan Manuel Suárez Del Toro Rivero (Spanish Red Cross)
- 2009–2017: Tadateru Konoe (Japanese Red Cross Society)
- 2017–2023: Francesco Rocca (Italian Red Cross)
- 2023–present: Kate Forbes (American Red Cross)

=== Funding and financial matters ===
The IFRC is funded by statutory contributions from National Societies, the delivery of field services to programme partners, and voluntary contributions from donors such as governments, corporations and individuals. The criteria for the statutory contributions of each National Society are established by the Finance Commission and approved by the General Assembly. Additional funding, especially for unforeseen relief assistance missions, is raised by emergency appeals.

== Emblem, mottos, and mission statement ==
The emblem of the IFRC is the combination of a red cross and a red crescent on a white background, surrounded by a red rectangular frame without any additional text. The red cross, the original symbol of the Movement, is on the left while the red crescent appears to the right. "Per Humanitatem ad Pacem" is the primary motto of the IFRC (Article 1 of the Constitution of the Federation). The mission statement of the IFRC, as formulated in its "Strategy 2010" document is "to improve the lives of vulnerable people by mobilizing the power of humanity". From 1999 to 2004, the common slogan for all activities of the International Movement was "The Power of Humanity". In December 2003, the 28th International Conference in Geneva adopted the conference motto "Protecting Human Dignity" as the new slogan for the entire Movement.

The official logo for the International Red Cross and Red Crescent Movement published in April 2016 was described as the red cross and red crescent emblems placed together side by side, encircled by the words "INTERNATIONAL MOVEMENT" in one or other of their official languages (Arabic, Chinese, English, French, Russian or Spanish). It was described as for use when the ICRC, the International Federation of Red Cross and Red Crescent Societies and the National Red Cross and Red Crescent Societies operate together for the purposes of a humanitarian emergency, or a theme or campaign of global concern.

The seven Fundamental Principles that guide the work of the IFRC and its members are: humanity, impartiality, neutrality, independence, voluntary service, unity and universality.

== Relationships within the International Red Cross and Red Crescent Movement ==
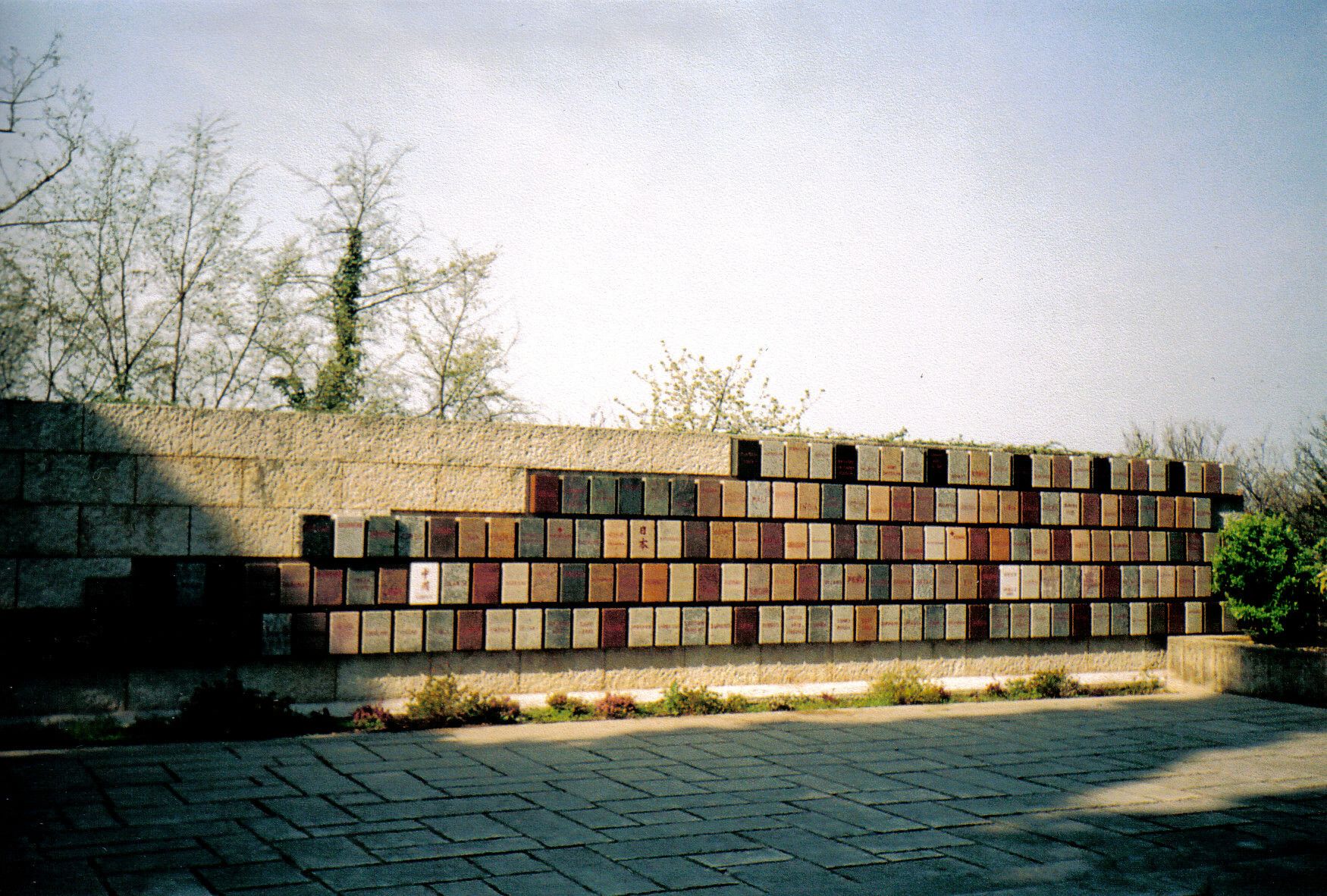
The International Red Cross Memorial in Solferino, Italy

The IFRC has come into conflict with the ICRC at various times, first and foremost when the American Red Cross threatened to supplant the ICRC with its creation of the league as "a real international Red Cross" after the First World War. Several agreements about the respective roles of the organizations helped to smooth relations, beginning with the agreement of 1928, the 1997 Seville Agreement and most recently the Supplementary Measures of 2005. The Seville Agreement gives the IFRC the lead in any emergency which does not take place as part of armed conflict (in which case the ICRC takes charge). Organizational discord has now largely subsided.
