= Catherine Carlson =

Catherine Carlson was appointed to the Provincial Court of Manitoba on November 23, 2006.

Carlson studied at the University of Manitoba Faculty of Law. During her first year of law school, she won the Miss Manitoba 1983 beauty pageant. After graduating in 1986, she worked with the Winnipeg law firm of Aikins, MacAulay & Thorvaldson, where she mainly practiced family law. In 2005, she began working with Justice Canada in the field of residential school claims and Aboriginal law services.

In 2012, Carlson sentenced ice hockey coach Graham James to two years imprisonment for the sexual abuse of hockey player Theo Fleury and his cousin Todd Holt. Several media commentators considered the sentence inadequate, and after an appeal, it was increased to five years.
