= Brent Stewart =

Brent D. Stewart was appointed to the Provincial Court of Manitoba on April 16, 1998.

Prior to his appointment, Judge Stewart was a partner in the law firm of Hoeschen and Stewart located in Morden, Manitoba. He has extensive experience in criminal, family and civil litigation matters. He was called to the bar in 1977 after graduating from the University of Manitoba's law school. Judge Stewart also served as mayor of Morden, president of its Chamber of Commerce and chair of the Morden Corn and Apple Festival.
