= Judith Webster =

Chief Justice of the Provincial Court of Manitoba
- In office 1993–2001
- Appointed by: Rosemary Vodrey

Judith Webster is a former judge in Manitoba, Canada. She served as Chief Justice of the Provincial Court of Manitoba from 1993 to 2001, and was the first woman to hold this position.

== Early life and career ==
Webster was born and raised in Winnipeg. She has a Bachelor of Arts degree from the University of Manitoba, and a Bachelor of Laws degree from the University of New Brunswick in Fredericton. Before becoming a judge, Webster was a Crown attorney.

== Provincial Chief Justice ==
Webster was appointed to the Manitoba Provincial Court in 1989 as a judge in Winnipeg. In 1993, she was named as the court's Chief Justice by provincial Justice Minister Rosemary Vodrey. Her appointment was generally recognized as a significant breakthrough for female judges in the province. As Chief Justice, Webster served on the nominating committee for new provincial judges.

She was criticized in 1994, after she transferred Judge Ron Meyers from family violence court to the rural circuit. Two days before the transfer, the Winnipeg Free Press published an interview with Meyers in which he said that he became motivated to specialize in spousal assault cases due to witnessing domestic abuse in his family as a child. Webster described the transfer as a routine reassignment, although she acknowledged that its timing appeared suspicious. Some speculated that Meyers was punished for stepping outside the traditionally detached role of the judiciary, and a number of women's groups called on Webster to reconsider her decision.

Webster had a sometimes fractious relationship with Vic Toews, who served as provincial Justice Minister from 1997 to 1999. In June 1999, she expressed her "profound disappointment" with what she described as "misleading and inaccurate" statements by Toews about the workload the judges. Toews refused to apologize, and said that official records backed his claims.

In 2001, Webster assigned herself to oversee an inquest into the murders of two aboriginal sisters the previous February. The sisters had telephoned the police five times, including four calls for the 9-1-1 emergency service, but police cars were only sent after the first and last calls. During this period, Webster announced that judges who preside over inquests would be allowed to set aside official work hours to write their reports. Provincial Justice Minister Gord Mackintosh approved of this decision, saying that it would reduce delays before the reports were released.

== Provincial Justice ==
Webster resigned as Chief Justice in October 2001, citing new provincial legislation that placed a term limit on her position. She was formally exempt from the legislation as the incumbent Chief Justice, but argued that she should abide by its spirit and resign after eight years in the position. She remained an active judge on the provincial court.

Webster issued her report into the 911 murders in October 2002, and made several recommendations to restore confidence in the system. One of her more noteworthy recommendations was that the province should review its zero tolerance legislation for situations of domestic abuse. The law required that police attending a domestic incident must charge the accused, even if the alleged victim did not wish to press charges or if there was no evidence of assault. Webster argued that this policy slowed police response to calls, and adversely affected the workload of other agencies. She also criticized 911's decision to identify all domestic calls as "Priority 1" after the murders, arguing that this actually created a slower response time to real emergencies.

Webster resigned from the bench in 2006.
