= Emil Sandström =

Chairman of the international League of Red Cross and Red Crescent Societies

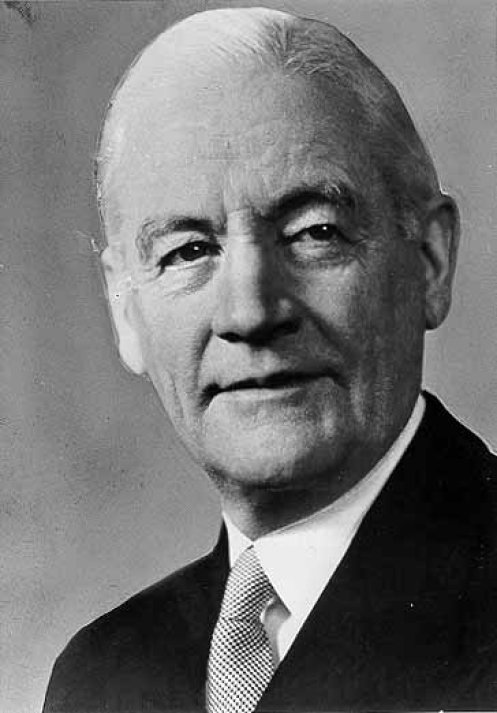

Chairman of the League of Red Cross Societies
- In office 1950–1959
- Preceded by: Basil O'Connor
- Succeeded by: John MacAulay

Chairman of the Swedish Red Cross
- In office 1948–1960
- Preceded by: Folke Bernadotte
- Succeeded by: Clare Nordenson

Chairman of the United Nations Special Committee on Palestine
- In office 2 June 1947 – 31 August 1947

Justice of the Supreme Court
- In office 1 October 1935 – 1943
- In office 15 June 1931 – 30 July 1933

Personal details
- Born: Alfred Emil Fredrik Sandström; 11 October 1886 Nyköping, Sweden
- Died: 6 July 1962 (aged 75) Stockholm, Sweden
- Spouse: Anna Åkerman (m. 1915)
- Relatives: Per Lind (son-in-law)
- Education: Nyköpings högre allmänna läroverk Uppsala University
- Occupation: Judge

Alfred Emil Fredrik Sandström (11 October 1886 – 6 July 1962) was a Swedish lawyer. He was the chairman of the United Nations Special Committee on Palestine (UNSCOP) in 1947, and the chairman of the League of Red Cross Societies from 1950 to 1959.

== Legal career ==
Sandstrom served as a Supreme Court judge at the Permanent Court of Arbitration in The Hague as well as the so-called Mixed Courts of Egypt that settled disputes between Egyptians and foreigners. He also acted as an international mediator.

He was the Swedish representative of the United Nations in Palestine and chaired the United Nations Special Committee on Palestine (UNSCOP) from June 1947. This committee was convened to decide the fate of Palestine as the British Mandate was about to expire. Rather than creating two states, Sandstrom proposed establishing a Jewish state that would encompass part of the country while annexing the rest to Jordan. When he visited Jordan to check out this option, the idea was clearly supported by King Abdullah.

In addition he succeeded Count Folke Bernadotte as chairman of the Swedish Red Cross.

In 1950, Sandström became a member of the Institute of International Law.

Non-profit organization positions
Preceded by Basil O'Connor	Chairman of the League of Red Cross Societies; 1950–1959	Succeeded by John MacAulay
