= Kenneth Champagne =

Canadian jurist

Kenneth Champagne is a Canadian jurist who was appointed to the Provincial Court of Manitoba in the Province of Manitoba on April 14, 2005.

Champagne was named Chief Judge of the Manitoba Provincial Court in 2009 and was appointed as a federal judge on April 5, 2018.
