= José Barroso Chávez =

Mexican Red Cross official

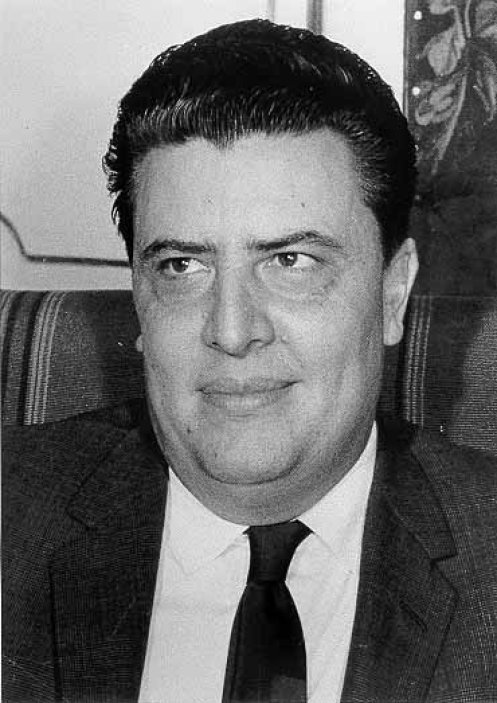
José Barroso Chávez

José Barroso Chávez (1925 in Mexico City – February 5, 2008 in Mexico City) was a Red Cross official.

He graduated from La Salle University. He was the President of the International Federation of Red Cross and Red Crescent Societies from 1965 to 1977. Chávez was the first Latin American person to be the President of the Red Cross.

Non-profit organization positions
Preceded by John MacAulay	Chairman of the International League of Red Cross and Red Crescent Societies; 1965–1977	Succeeded by Adetunji Adefarasin
