= Janice leMaistre =

Janice leMaistre was appointed to the Provincial Court of Manitoba on November 23, 2006.

Judge leMaistre graduated from the Faculty of Law at the University of Manitoba in 1991. She completed her articles with Manitoba Justice and worked in the Crown's office until her appointment to the bench, developing expertise in matters involving child abuse, elder abuse, spousal abuse prosecutions, inquests, and assize and appellate work. More recently, she held the position of supervising senior Crown attorney in the family violence unit. She took part in the development of a number of key initiatives, such as the award-winning Domestic Violence Front End Project, the child victim support initiative, phase two of zero tolerance and the Early Intervention Program.
