= Rodney Garson =

Canadian judge

Rodney Garson was appointed to the Provincial Court of Manitoba on December 15, 2006.

Judge Garson graduated from the Faculty of Law at McGill University in 1988. In 1990, he joined Justice Canada in Whitehorse where he conducted criminal prosecutions and later worked as a litigator in the private bar. After 1999, he held positions in Manitoba Justice and Justice Canada. He recently held the position of Crown counsel with the Constitutional Law Branch of Manitoba Justice, where his work focused on Charter of Rights and Freedoms issues in criminal and Aboriginal law. He has also been active in the community, particularly in the areas of community-based justice initiatives and continuing legal education.

Judge Rodney Garson was appointed as a judge of The Provincial Court of Manitoba by Order in Council No. 532/2006 and resigned on August 16, 2008, Order in Council No. 00396 / 2008.
