= Sidney Lerner =

Canadian judge

Sidney Lerner was appointed to the Provincial Court of Manitoba on August 4, 1999.

Before his appointment to the bench, Judge Lerner served as the senior Crown attorney for Court of Queen's Bench trials. He received his law degree from the University of Manitoba in 1981 and was called to the bar in 1982. He worked in private practice before joining the Crown attorney's office in 1984 and has extensive criminal law experience.
