= Rob Finlayson =

Robin A. Finlayson was appointed to the Provincial Court of Manitoba on February 1, 2006.

Judge Finlayson graduated from the University of Manitoba Law School in 1975. He articled with Manitoba Justice and practiced law as a Crown attorney from 1976 until his appointment to the bench. He held the positions of senior Crown attorney and Director of Prosecutions before being appointed Assistant Deputy Attorney General in 1998.

Judge Finlayson has served on a number of federal and provincial committees, including the Uniform Law Conference of Canada and the federal, provincial and territorial Heads of Prosecutions Committee. He was appointed by the Attorney General to co-chair the Child Online Protection Committee to establish Cybertip.ca. It is now Canada’s national tip line for reporting online child pornography and internet luring incidents to police and it provides related information to the public.

Judge Finlayson also chaired a working group of Crown attorneys and chiefs of police that produced a report in January 2005 exploring possibilities for the prevention of miscarriages of justice.
