= Kelly Moar =

Kelly Moar was appointed to the Provincial Court of Manitoba on April 14, 2005.

Judge Moar received his call to the bar in 1997. As a Crown attorney, he was involved in prosecuting serious cases and handling inquests, bail hearings and various criminal law proceedings. Before he became a lawyer, he worked with Winnipeg Child and Family Services as a social worker and with the Native Alcoholism Council of Manitoba as a chemical dependency counsellor. He has also been active in the Métis community over the years, with a special interest in sports.
