= Jean McBride =

Canadian judge

Jean McBride was appointed to the Provincial Court of Manitoba on June 18, 2008, filling an opening in Portage la Prairie.

Judge McBride studied law at the University of Manitoba, graduating in 1998. From her graduation until her appointment to the bench, she practiced as a provincial Crown attorney. She worked for six years with the domestic violence unit, and then with the criminal organization prosecution unit.
