= Doreen Redhead =

Doreen Redhead was appointed to the Provincial Court of Manitoba on April 5, 2007.

Judge Redhead was graduated from the University of Manitoba Law School in 1996. She also holds a Bachelor of Arts in sociology. She articled with Lofchick, Jones & Associates in Winnipeg and practised law on behalf of the Fox Lake First Nation in Gillam and the Keewatin Tribal Council in Thompson.

She was the first First Nations woman appointed to the bench in Manitoba.

Judge Redhead has served on a number of boards, including the Keewatin Housing Association and Broadband Communications North, and has been actively involved in a number of other committees and associations.
