= Marcel Bélanger =

Canadian economist

- Born: June 2, 1920; Deschaillons, Quebec
- Died: May 3, 2013 (aged 92); Quebec City, Quebec
- Occupation: academic
- Awards: Order of Canada; National Order of Quebec

Marcel Bélanger, OC GOQ (June 2, 1920 – May 2, 2013) was a Canadian academic.

Born in Deschaillons, Quebec, he received a Bachelor of Arts degree in 1940 and a Master of Commerce degree in 1943 from Université Laval. He received a Master of Arts in economics from Harvard University in 1948.

From 1946 to 1972, he was a professor of economics at the Université Laval. From 1946 to 1977, he was a founding partner of the Chartered Accountant firm, Bélanger Dallaire Gagnon & Associates (today part of Ernst & Young).

From 1960 to 1976, he helped advise the Quebec government on federal-provincial relations and public finance for Premiers Jean Lesage, Daniel Johnson, Jean-Jacques Bertrand, and Robert Bourassa.

He was a member of the Board of Directors of Abitibi-Price, National Bank of Canada, BCE Inc., Celanese Canada, Eldorado Nuclear, Cameco, Great-West Assurance, Labatt Brewing Company, Pratt & Whitney Canada, Hudson's Bay Company, Provigo, and ING Canada.

From 1975 to 1976, he was the President of the Canadian Institute of Chartered Accountants.

In 1974, he was made an Officer of the Order of Canada "for his contribution in the areas of teaching, business administration, and public administration". In 1994, he was made a Grand Officer of the National Order of Quebec.
