= James Cox Aikins =

Canadian politician (1823–1904)

The Honourable James Cox Aikins PC
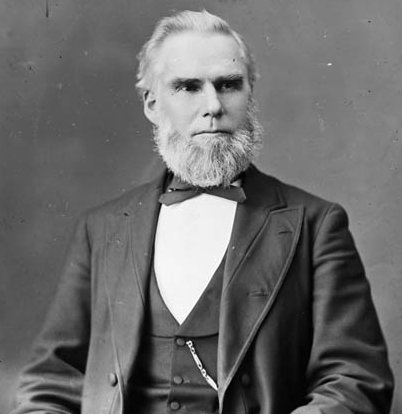

Canadian Senator from Ontario
- In office October 23, 1867 – May 30, 1882
- Nominated by: John A. Macdonald
- Appointed by: Royal Proclamation
- In office January 7, 1896 – August 6, 1904
- Nominated by: Mackenzie Bowell

4th Lieutenant Governor of Manitoba
- In office September 29, 1882 – June 30, 1888
- Monarch: Victoria
- Governors General: Marquess of Lorne; The Marquess of Lansdowne; The Lord Stanley of Preston
- Premier: John Norquay; David Howard Harrison; Thomas Greenway
- Preceded by: Joseph-Édouard Cauchon
- Succeeded by: John Christian Schultz

Personal details
- Born: March 30, 1823 Toronto Township, Upper Canada
- Died: August 6, 1904 (aged 81) Toronto, Ontario, Canada
- Resting place: Mount Pleasant Cemetery, Toronto
- Party: Liberal-Conservative
- Children: James Albert Manning Aikins
- Cabinet: Secretary of State of Canada (1869–1873 & 1878–1880); Superintendent-General of Indian Affairs (Acting) (1873); Secretary of State for the Provinces (Acting) (1873); Minister of Inland Revenue (1880–1882)

James Cox Aikins, PC (March 30, 1823 – August 6, 1904) was a Canadian politician in the 19th century. He twice served as a cabinet minister in the government of John A. Macdonald, and was the fourth Lieutenant Governor of Manitoba from 1882 to 1888.

== Early life and career ==
Aikins was born in Toronto Township, Upper Canada (now Mississauga, Ontario). His father had previously converted to Methodism, and the young Aikins was educated at the Methodist-run Upper Canada Academy in Cobourg from 1840 to 1845. Upon graduation, he acquired land near Toronto and worked as a farmer.

Aikins was offered the Reform (i.e., Liberal) nomination for York West in the 1851 Canadian parliamentary election, but declined. Three years later, he was elected to the Province of Canada's legislature for the newly formed riding of Peel as a Clear Grit (i.e., radical reformer). Cox defeated Conservative G. Wright by 865 votes to 810.

The Clear Grit faction in parliament had previously been aligned with Francis Hincks's governing Reformers, but this alliance ended after the 1854 election. Most of Hincks's supporters subsequently formed a new alliance with the Conservatives, while the Clear Grits formed a "left opposition" and attempted to reconstruct the Reform Party on their terms. Aikins was a minor figure in the Grit parliamentary ranks for the next three years but was nevertheless re-elected in 1857, with 2007 votes against 915 for his Conservative opponent. The Conservative-led alliance remained in power during these years, and Aikins remained in opposition.

Between 1856 and 1861, there were numerous debates in Peel County concerning a planned division of the riding, and the location of its new county seat. Local differences weakened the reformist cause, and Aikins was narrowly defeated by Conservative John Hillyard Cameron in the election of 1861.

In 1862, Aikins was elected to an eight-year term in the Province of Canada's Legislative Council, an upper house with both appointed and elected members. Running as a Liberal in the Home division, he defeated his sole opponent by 2934 votes to 1559.

Aikins played only a minor role in the parliamentary debates on Canadian Confederation, which he supported in principle despite concerns about the legislative means which John A. Macdonald was using to move the policy forward. After Confederation was approved, Aikins attempted to introduce legislation for an elected senate, but was ruled out-of-order by the Council's speaker. Along with other members of the Legislative Council, he was appointed to the (unelected) Canadian Senate upon its creation in May 1867. Representing the (Ontario) Senate Division. In 1868, Aikins was offered a cabinet position in Prime Minister John A. Macdonald's Liberal-Conservative government, but turned it down for fear of dividing the Liberal Party.

== Cabinet minister and lieutenant governor ==
In 1869, Francis Hincks returned to Canadian political life by joining Macdonald's government as a "coalition Reformer". Macdonald wanted Liberal Senators William McMaster and Aikins to join Hincks in the ministry, to further broaden its appeal with the electorate; McMaster declined, but suggested that Aikins accept the offer and represent Liberal interests inside the government. Aikins was agreeable to his suggestion, and became a Minister without Portfolio on November 16. On December 8, he was appointed Secretary of State for Canada, and would continue to hold this position until the defeat of the Macdonald government on November 5, 1873. He also served as acting Secretary of State for the Provinces and Superintendent-General of Indian Affairs for one month in 1873, following the resignation of Joseph Howe.

When Macdonald's Conservatives were returned to government in 1878, Aikins was again appointed Secretary of State for Canada as the ministry's sole "coalition Reformer" (the group was by this time a minor political force in Canada). On November 8, 1880, Aikins was promoted to the Ministry of Inland Revenue. In this capacity, he oversaw various applications for government postings; he had little direct control over patronage in central Canada, but was a more powerful figure as regards the western provinces.

Aikins's support for temperance was an embarrassment for the Macdonald government, which received considerable financial support from liquor interests. On May 22, 1882, Aikins was persuaded to resign from cabinet and the Senate, and to accept an appointment as Lieutenant Governor of Manitoba (with the promise of being re-appointed to the Senate after his term ended). He formally resigned from the Senate on May 30, and was sworn into his new position on December 2.

Aikins arrived in Manitoba during a period of discord between the provincial and federal governments; Macdonald had recently disallowed Premier John Norquay's railway legislation, and an opposition movement was forming around Thomas Greenway. Aikins was under orders from Macdonald to ensure that provincial legislation reflected national policies, but his awkward relationship with Norquay made his task difficult.

Aikins presided over the transfer of power from Norquay to Greenway in 1887-88, but his own involvement in Manitoba politics was fairly limited. Initially a very powerful office, the position of Lieutenant Governor in Manitoba was largely ceremonial by this time and more so under his predecessor Cauchon.

Aikins's term in office ended on July 1, 1888, though he was not re-appointed to the Senate until January 7, 1896 again representing (Ontario). By now fully integrated into the Conservative ranks, he remained a Senator until his death in 1904. He is buried in Mount Pleasant Cemetery, Toronto.

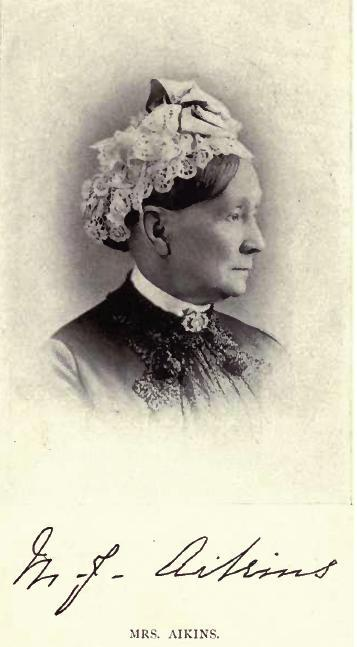
Mrs Mary Elizabeth Jane Aikins by Mrs Carr

== Family ==
James Cox Aikins married Mary Elizabeth Jane Somerset on June 5, 1845. She was the only daughter of John Somerset, Esquire, of Toronto. She was a founder and the first president of the Women's Hospital Aid Society of Winnipeg, Manitoba. She was a founder of the Christian Woman's Union of Winnipeg. The couple had three sons and two daughters. Mary Elizabeth Jane died May 25, 1899. One of the couple's sons, also named James, served as Lt. Governor of Manitoba in the early 20th century.

== Archives ==
There are James Cox Aikins fonds at Library and Archives Canada and the Archives of Manitoba.
