= Canadian Tax Foundation =

Canadian non-profit organization

- Formation: 1945; 81 years ago
- Type: Nonprofit
- Tax ID no.: R-106867260 (GST/HST)
- Purpose: Tax research
- Locations: Toronto, Canada; Quebec, Canada
- Methods: Conferences, seminars
- Members: 13,000 (2025)
- Official language: English, French
- Executive Director and CEO: Heather L. Evans
- Chair: Anu Nijhawan
- CFO: Shelly Ali
- Publication: Canadian Tax Journal
- Website: ctf.ca

The Canadian Tax Foundation is an independent, non-partisan, non-profit tax research organization under the joint sponsorship of the Canadian Institute of Chartered Accountants and the Canadian Bar Association. It was founded in 1945, and it provides a forum for lawyers, accountants, academics, and other tax professionals to work together for the betterment of the Canadian tax system and the tax profession in general. The Canadian Tax Foundation has more than 10,000 members.

== Information ==
The Foundation is located in downtown Toronto, Ontario. In 1987, the Foundation's Quebec office was established in Montreal to serve the Quebec tax community in both official languages and to provide francophone practitioners across Canada with access in French to the Foundation's services. The Quebec office organizes conferences, seminars, and other professional-development events; maintains working relationships with tax authorities in Quebec and Ottawa; and represents the Foundation on various committees and working groups.

The Foundation fulfills its educational mandate through its conferences and seminars and through a wide range of events, awards, and publications. The Young Practitioners program, which has 9 regional chapters, is aimed at tax professionals with up to 10 years of experience. The Douglas J. Sherbaniuk Distinguished Writing Award, which is named after the Foundation's late director emeritus, is conferred annually on the author of the best writing undertaken for the Foundation in the previous year. The Foundation also confers up to four regional Student-Paper Awards annually: the Canadian Tax Foundation-Bert Wolfe Nitikman Foundation Award (Western Canada), the Canadian Tax Foundation-Fasken Martineau DuMoulin Award (Ontario), the Canadian Tax Foundation-Jean Potvin Award (Quebec), and the Canadian Tax Foundation-McInnes Cooper Award (Atlantic Canada).

The Foundation sponsors or directly carries out expert research in taxation and public finance and publishes the results of that research. The wide-ranging publications program includes treatises, textbooks, conference proceedings, and monographs. In addition, the Foundation publishes timely newsletters: Canadian Tax Highlights/Faits saillants en fiscalité canadienne; Tax for the Owner-Manager/Actualités fiscales pour les propriétaires exploitants; Canadian Tax Focus, which is written by and for young practitioners; and Brian J. Arnold's online column, The Arnold Report.

The Douglas J. Sherbaniuk Research Centre, located in the Foundation's Toronto office, contains one of the largest publicly accessible collections of tax information in the world. The centre's holdings include contemporary and historical materials on Canadian and international tax, public finance, and fiscal policy. The centre also houses a complete collection of the Foundation's publications. Research assistance services are provided to members and to the public in person, by telephone, and through the Foundation's website feature, "Ask a Librarian."
