= Fred Sandhu =

Canadian judge

Fred Harinder Singh Sandhu was appointed to the Provincial Court of Manitoba on May 1, 2003.

Judge Sandhu graduated from the University of Manitoba's Faculty of Law in 1979. After his call to the bar, he worked with Legal Aid Manitoba, focusing on criminal law. Judge Sandhu was a certified youth soccer coach and a past member of the board of the Dauphin Friendship Centre.
