= Harinder Singh Sekhon =

Malaysian athlete (born 1991)

- Born: 9 April 1991 (age 35); Kuala Lumpur, Malaysia
- Education: Loughborough University
- Occupations: Athlete; teacher
- Known for: Cricket; Box Jump; Standing Jump
- Notable work: Current World Record Holder - Highest Seated Box Jump; Current World Record Holder - Highest Standing Jump One leg; Current National Record Holder - Highest Standing Jump

Harinder Singh Sekhon (born April 9, 1991), also known as Harinder Sekhon and Harinder Singh Sekhon, is a two time World record holder for the highest standing jump (one leg). and the highest seated box jump. He is a Malaysian international cricketer and holds the national record for highest standing jump.

== Biography ==
Harinder Sekhon was born and raised in Kuala Lumpur, Malaysia. He spent his early childhood in Malaysia having attended the Maz International School and later Loughborough University in the United Kingdom for his graduate studies. He is a teacher by profession, a cricketer and jumper. and Highest Seated Box Jump

Harinder's achievements are mainly in sports, the latest being on 15 October 2022 when broke the world record for the highest seated box jump with 1.52 meters. On 23 May 2021, he broke the world record for the highest standing jump (one leg) with 1.384 m (4 ft 6.5 in) and on 15 March 2021 he also broke the Malaysian national record for the highest standing jump by making a 140 cm (55 in) jump. He is the current national record holder of the title.

In 2017, Harinder captained the Malaysia XI cricket team in two matches presenting T20 series vs. Maldives in Kuala Lumpur, Malaysia.

In the same year, he also represented Malaysia in the Indoor Cricket World Cup held in Dubai. The match attracted more than 400 indoor cricketers. Harinder was the first Malaysian to make such a representation in the sport. On 13 November 2016, he participated in the national cricket debut of Malaysia vs. Singapore in Johor. Harinder has also toured Sri Lanka with the national team 2018 and in 2019 played a season of the first grade cricket in Queensland, Australia where he went to play representative district level.

== Player profile ==
Malaysian Cricket Association.

Team: Malaysia, Kuala Lumpur

CC player ID: 1280783

Team name: Southern Hitters

Age: 31

Playing role: Wicket Keeper

Batting style: Right Handed Batsman

Bowling style: Right Arm Medium

== Achievements ==
- World record for the highest seated box jump at 1.52 meters of October 2022.
- World record Holder: Broke the World record for the Highest Standing Jump (One leg) (1.384 m [4 ft 6.5 in]) in Shah Alam, Selangor, Malaysia, on 23 May 2021.
- National record holder: Broke the national record for the Highest Standing Jump (140 cm [55 in]) on 15 March 2021 in Kuala Lumpur.
- National cricket debut: 13 November 2016 v Singapore in Johor.
- Captained ‘Malaysia X’ in a two match T20 series V Maldives in Kuala Lumpur, 2017.
- Represented Malaysia in the Indoor Cricket World Cup in Dubai, 2017 He was also the first Malaysian Sikh to represent Malaysia in cricket world cup.
