= Manitoba Bar Association =

- Predecessor: Winnipeg Bar Association
- Founded: 1911; 115 years ago
- Type: Bar association
- Legal status: active
- Purpose: advocate and public voice, educator and network
- Headquarters: 1420 - 444 St. Mary Ave, Winnipeg, MB
- Region served: Manitoba
- Members: 1,600
- Official language: English; French
- President (2026-present): Robert Pellizzaro
- Parent organization: Canadian Bar Association
- Website: www.cba-mb.ca

The Manitoba Bar Association (MBA) is an organization of members of the legal profession in Manitoba, Canada. It is a non-profit professional association, and is a branch of the Canadian Bar Association. As of 2026, the MBA represents approximately 1,600 members from across the province, including lawyers, judges, notaries, law teachers, and law students.

== History ==
The Manitoba Bar Association was preceded by the Winnipeg Bar Association, which had been in operation since June 1906. On 10 November 1911, the Winnipeg Association decided that it would expand to a province-wide organization.

== Governance and membership ==
The Manitoba Bar Association is governed by an elected council of 20 members who are elected for a two-year term. There are 15 elected members from the Winnipeg, two from Dauphin/western Manitoba, two from central/eastern Manitoba, and one from northern Manitoba.

As of 2026, the MBA represents approximately 1,600 members from across the province, including lawyers, judges, notaries, law teachers, and law students.

The MBA currently has 38 active Sections. Sections are groups of members who practise in a particular area of the law or share a common goal or interest. Registration in an MBA Section automatically enrolls the member in the corresponding National Section. Members registered for a Section are entitled to participate in the business and activities of that Section, including voting and nomination for office.

== See also ==
- Law Society of Manitoba
