= Raymond E. Wyant =

Chief Judge, Provincial Court of Manitoba
- In office 2002–2009

Raymond E. Wyant is the former Chief Judge of the Provincial Court of Manitoba, Canada. He was appointed as a judge in 1998 and made chief judge in 2002 and acted as such until 2009. Wyant received his law degree from the University of Manitoba. Before being appointed to the bench, he worked both as a defence lawyer and as a crown attorney. He has taught courses in Criminal Law and advocacy at the University of Manitoba. Judge Wyant is also a deputy judge of the Yukon Territorial Court.
