= Law Society of Manitoba =

Professional body in Manitoba, Canada

- Abbreviation: LSM
- Formation: 1877
- Type: Law society
- Legal status: active
- Purpose: advocate and public voice, educator and network
- Headquarters: 200 – 260 St. Mary Ave., Winnipeg, Manitoba
- Region served: Manitoba
- Members: 2,072 (2021)
- Official language: English; French
- President: Lynda Troup
- CEO: Leah Kosokowsky
- Website: www.lawsociety.mb.ca

The Law Society of Manitoba (LSM) is the self-governing regulatory body of the legal profession in Manitoba, Canada. Membership in the LSM is required in order to practice law in the province.

As of the end of 2021, the LSM had 2072 members with active practising status: 1821 practising within Winnipeg, 251 within Manitoba but outside of Winnipeg, and 81 outside of Manitoba. 1282 lawyers practised in private practice with 443 law firms of which 56% are sole practitioners. A gender gap still exists with 830 women practising compared to 1242 men. 56% of those women practice in private practice while 74% of men are in private practice. Those not in private practice work for government, as corporate counsel, or in education.

The LSM also operates the Manitoba Law Library (also known as the Great Library), housed on the 3rd floor of the Manitoba Law Courts building.

== Overview ==
The Society sets its own admission requirements. The qualification process to become a lawyer in Manitoba includes having successfully completed the combination of the bar admission courses and a period of articles. Since 2002, bar admission requirements have been fulfilled by completion of the courses offered by the Canadian Centre for Professional Legal Education (CPLED), a joint initiative of the provinces of Manitoba, Saskatchewan, and Alberta.

The LSM exists by virtue of the Legal Professions Act of Manitoba. Section 3(1) of the Act establishes the LSM's purpose. It states: "The purpose of the society is to uphold and protect the public interest in the delivery of legal services with competence, integrity and independence. ". The Act establishes a governing board consisting of "Benchers". The LSM sets the standard of conduct for lawyers within its membership, and disciplines those lawyers who do not meet such standards. The Society's mission statement is a "public well-served by a competent, honorable and independent legal profession," with a mandate to act in the public interest to ensure that lawyers in Manitoba practice competently and ethically.
