= Canadian Bar Association =

Bar association in Canada

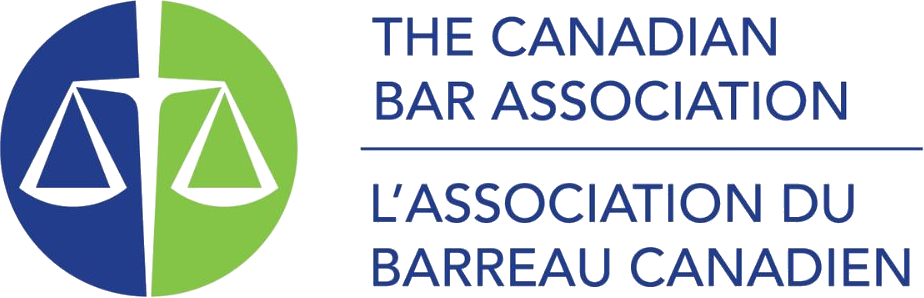
- Founded: 1896
- Type: Bar association
- Purpose: Advocate and public voice, educator and network
- Headquarters: Ottawa, Ontario
- Region served: Canada
- Official language: English; French
- Website: cba.org

The Canadian Bar Association (CBA), or Association du barreau canadien (ABC) in French, represents over 37,000 lawyers, judges, notaries, law teachers, and law students from across Canada.

== History ==
A dinner of the Ontario Bar Association, a branch of the CBA in Canada's most populous province, in 1910 in Toronto

The Association's first Annual Meeting was held in Montreal in 1896. However, the CBA has been in continuous existence in its present form since 1914. The Association was incorporated in 1921.

== Objectives ==
The CBA is a voluntary bar association for members of the legal profession; it is the voice of its members and its primary purpose is to serve its members; it is the premier provider of personal and professional development and support to members of the legal profession; it promotes fair justice systems, facilitates effective law reform, promotes equality in the legal profession and is devoted to the elimination of discrimination; the CBA is a leading edge organization committed to enhancing the professional and commercial interests of a diverse membership and to protecting the independence of the judiciary and the bar.

The Association advances its objectives through the work of its sections, committees, conferences and task forces at both the national and branch levels. It has branches in each of the provinces and three territories. Membership is voluntary in all but New Brunswick, where by agreement with the law society, lawyers in the province belong to the national association. Approximately half of all practicing lawyers in Canada belong to the Canadian Bar Association.

== Organization ==
The national office of the Canadian Bar Association is located in Ottawa. With a staff of 80, the national office provides legislative monitoring and liaison (60 - 70 submissions are made federally each year), membership, continuing legal education, translation, meeting coordination, accounting, data processing, communications, printing, and professional services. The Association's website and databanks are administered by the national office.

Policy decisions are made by Council which meets twice a year (February and August) and includes approximately 225 voting members representing the membership across Canada. The members of national Council elect the treasurer and the second vice president.

The 32 national sections of the Canadian Bar Association provide a forum for development of individual specialties. These sections provide information to Association members on specific areas of law. Along with the standing committees, task forces and conferences, the sections offer individual lawyers an opportunity to keep up to date with current developments in the law and provides them with information through newsletters, the web and meetings.

The Canadian Bar Association is also affiliated with several international associations, including the Commonwealth Lawyers Association, International Bar Association, the Inter-American Bar Association and the International Commission of Jurists. The Association also maintains a strong liaison with the American Bar Association. Membership in these groups provides the Association with input on recent developments in the legal profession on a broad scale.

== Arms ==
Coat of arms of Canadian Bar Association
Notes The arms of the Canadian Bar Association consist of: Crest A demi-lion Azure gorged with a wing collar holding in the dexter forepaw a bell the sinister forepaw resting on a bowl placed on its edge, all Argent. Escutcheon Argent a double ansul Azure within an orle of 12 [now 13] maple leaves Gules. Supporters Two griffins per fess Gules and Ermine winged Argent. Compartment A mahogany panel proper set with a bar Or
