= Ferris (name) =

Ferris, also spelled Ferriss, is both a given name and a family name. It is related to the name Fergus in Ireland, and the name Ferrers in England. In Ireland, the Ferris family of County Kerry derives its surname from the patronymic Ó Fearghusa. It is also the English spelling of the similar Arabic derived names (Faris, Farris, Feras, Firas).

== People with the surname ==
- A. Boyd Ferris (1929–1989), Canadian lawyer
- Aidan Ferris (born 1996), Scottish footballer
- Albert Warren Ferris (1856–1937), American psychiatrist
- Alex Ferris (born 1997), Canadian actor
- Andrea Ferris (born 1987), Panamanian middle-distance runner
- Anne Ferris (born 1954), Irish Labour politician
- Audrey Ferris (1909–1990), American actress
- Barbara Ferris (1936–2025), British actress and model
- Ben Ferris, Australian filmmaker
- Benjamin Ferris (historian) (1780–1867), American watchmaker and historian
- Bob Ferris (born 1955), American baseball player
- Charles G. Ferris (1796–1848), American politician from New York
- Charles D. Ferris (born 1931), American Chairman of the Federal Communications Commission
- Christopher Ferris (born 1957), American computer scientist
- Cory Ferris, American bass guitarist, Woe, is Me
- Costas Ferris (born 1935), Greek film director
- Ferris Danial (born 1992), Malaysian football player
- Dave Ferriss (1921–2016), American baseball player
- David Lincoln Ferris (1864–1947), American bishop
- Dee Ferris (born 1973), British artist
- Devereaux Ferris (born 1994), New Zealand rugby player
- Drew Ferris (born 1992), American football player
- Edythe Ferris (1897–1995), American artist
- Elizabeth Ferris (disambiguation), several people
- Emil Ferris (born 1962), American comics creator
- Eugene W. Ferris (1842–1907), American soldier
- Evie Ferris, Australian ballerina
- Francis Ferris (1932–2018), British judge
- Franklin Ferriss (1849–1933), American justice from Missouri
- Geoff Ferris, Northern Ireland football manager
- Geoff Ferris (motorsport) (born 1936), British racing car designer
- George Ferris (disambiguation), several people
- Gerald R. Ferris, American professor
- Glenn Ferris (born 1950), American jazz trombonist
- Gordon Ferris (born 1952), British heavyweight boxer
- Gordon Floyd Ferris (1893–1958), American entomologist and biologist
- Grey Ferris (1946–2008), American attorney and politician
- Hank Ferris, American football coach
- Helene Ferris, rabbi
- Hobe Ferris (1877–1938), American baseball player
- Hugh Ferris (disambiguation) or Ferriss, several people
- Isaac Ferris (1798–1873), president of New York University
- J. J. Ferris (1867–1900), Australian cricketer
- Jackson Ferris (rugby league) (born 1998), New Zealand rugby player
- Jackson Ferris (baseball) (born 2004), American baseball player
- James Ferris (disambiguation) or Ferriss, several people
- Jason Ferris (born 1976), Australian rugby player
- Jean Ferris (1939–2015), American writer
- Jean Leon Gerome Ferris (1863–1930), American painter
- Jeannie Ferris (1941–2007), Australian politician, lobbyist, and journalist
- Jeanine Pirro (born 1951) Lebanese-American political commentator and attorney
- Jim Ferris, American professor of Disabilities Studies
- Jimmy Ferris (1894–1934), Irish footballer
- Joe Ferris, American baseball player
- John Ferris (disambiguation), several people
- Joseph Ferris (1934–2020), American politician
- Joshua Ferris (born 1974), American author
- Joshua Beal Ferris (1804–1886), American politician
- Julie Ferris, Canadian musician, Moev
- Kane Ferris (born 1984), New Zealand rugby player
- Karl Ferris (born 1948), English music photographer/designer
- Keith Ferris (born 1929), American aviation artist
- Keltie Ferris (born 1977), American abstract painter
- Leo Ferris (1917–1993), American businessman
- Madison Ferris, American actress
- Martin Ferris (born 1952), Irish politician
- Michael Ferris (politician) (1931–2000), Irish politician
- Michelle Ferris (born 1976), Australian cyclist
- Michael Ferris, American screenwriter
- Mortimer Y. Ferris (1881–1941), American politician from New York
- Neil Ferris (1927–1996), American footballer
- Orange Ferriss (1814–1894), American politician
- Pam Ferris (born 1948), German-born British actress
- Pat Ferris (born 1975), Canadian curler
- Paul Ferris (disambiguation), several people
- Pedro Ferris (1416–1478), Spanish Catholic bishop and cardinal
- Peewee Ferris, Australian DJ
- Ray Ferris (1920–1994), Irish football player
- Richard J. Ferris (1936–2022), American businessman
- Roger Ferris, English pop composer
- Ron Ferris (born 1945), Canadian Anglican bishop
- Roxana Judkins Stinchfield Ferris (1895–1978), American botanist
- Sam Ferris (1900–1980), British long-distance running athlete
- Samantha Ferris (born 1968), Canadian actress
- Sarge Ferris (1928–1989), American poker player
- Scott Ferris (1877–1945), American politician from Oklahoma
- Sharon Ferris (born 1974), New Zealand sailor
- Sid Ferris, (c.1908–1993), English cyclist
- Stephen Ferris (born 1985), Irish rugby player
- Solomon Ferris (c.1748–1803), British naval officer
- Tevin Ferris (born 1996), Australian rugby player
- Theodore E. Ferris (1872–1953), American naval architect
- Tim Ferriss (born 1977), American investor, author and lifestyle guru
- Timothy Ferris (born 1944), American science writer
- Toiréasa Ferris (born 1980), Irish politician
- Tom Ferris, Canadian member of music group Moev
- Tony Ferris (born 1961), New Zealand footballer
- Wayne Ferris (born 1953), American wrestler
- Wesley Ferris (1927–2001), Irish cricketer
- William Ferris (politician) (1855–1917), Australian politician
- William H. Ferris (1874–1941), American author, minister, and scholar
- William R. Ferris (born 1942), American author and scholar
- Woodbridge N. Ferris (1853–1928), American educator

== People with the given name ==
- Ferris Ashton (1926–2013), Australian rugby player
- Ferris Bolton (1853–1937), Canadian politician
- Ferris Fain (1921–2001), American baseball player
- Ferris S. Fitch Jr. (1853–1920), American politician
- Ferris Foreman (1808–1901), American lawyer, politician, and soldier
- Ferris Greenslet (1875–1959), American editor and writer
- Ferris Taylor (1888–1961), American film actor
- Ferris Webster (1912–1989), American film editor

== Fictional characters ==
- Ferris Bueller, the protagonist of the film Ferris Bueller's Day Off and television series Ferris Bueller
- Ben Ferris, the real name of Cinder from the Killer Instinct video game series
- Bob Ferris (Likely Lads), a British sitcom character
- Carol Ferris, a DC Comics character
- Ferris, the unofficial mascot of the Rust programming language

== See also ==
- Farris (surname)
- Faris (name)
