= Jacques Viau =

Canadian jurist and lawyer (1919–2003)

Jacques Viau OC, QC

49th President of the Canadian Bar Association
- In office 1977–1978
- Preceded by: A. Boyd Ferris
- Succeeded by: Thomas J. Walsh

Bâtonnier of the Barreau du Québec
- In office 1974–1975
- Preceded by: Jean Moisan
- Succeeded by: Michel Robert

Personal details
- Born: 1919 Lachine, Quebec, Canada
- Died: December 4, 2003 (aged 73–74) Montreal, Quebec, Canada
- Spouse: Laurette Cadieux Viau
- Children: 2
- Education: University of Ottawa (LL.L)
- Profession: Lawyer

Jacques Viau OC QC (1919 – December 4, 2003) was a Canadian lawyer practising in Montreal, Quebec. He served as bâtonnier of the Barreau du Québec and the Bar of Montreal. He also served as president of the Canadian Bar Association from 1977 to 1978. During his term in office, he chaired a committee which produced a major set of recommendations for reform of the Constitution of Canada.

== Early life and family ==
Viau was born in 1919 in Lachine. He married Laurette Cadieux Viau. The couple had two children, Hélène and Jacques.

== Legal career ==
Viau earned his degree in Quebec civil law, a Licentiate of Laws, from the University of Ottawa. He was admitted to the Barreau du Québec in 1942. He practised in Montreal, particularly in the area of municipal law. From 1947 to 1952, he was a municipal court judge in Lachine and Dorval. The government of Quebec appointed him Queen's Counsel ("conseillier de la reine" in French) in 1951.

Viau earned a reputation as an expert in municipal law. He was one of the first lawyers in Quebec to take an interest in municipal law in a systemic fashion. He was credited with being one of the originators of Quebec municipal law as a recognised discipline as it is now known.

== Bâtonnier du Québec and bâtonnier of Montreal ==
In 1973–74, Viau served simultaneously as the Bâtonnier of the Barreau du Québec (the provincial bar association), and as Bâtonnier of the Bar of Montreal. He was the last person to hold both offices at the same time. He was bâtonnier at a time of considerable change in the legal profession in Quebec.

One major change was the new Professional Code introduced by the government of Quebec in 1973, which substantially re-organised the system of professional regulation in Quebec. As a result, the position of bâtonnier would henceforth be elected by universal suffrage of the lawyers of Quebec.

Viau was also heavily involved in the development of the Société québécoise d'information juridique ("SOQUIJ"), a new public organisation for the comprehensive publication of Quebec laws and court decisions, which was brought into operation in 1975. He had a strong interest in having a systemic approach to the publication of judicial decisions, which became one of the goals of SOQUIJ.

During his time in office, Viau was also involved in the implementation of the new legal aid system, instituted by the government of Quebec in 1972, in response to new federal funding for legal aid programs across Canada.

Another of the major events of his time as bâtonnier was the reform of the examination system for the admission of new lawyers. When he took office, the examinations essentially required students to memorise large portions of the Civil Code and the Code of Civil Procedure and then regurgitate their memory work over a series of exams during a two-day period. The students protested that this was not a truly effective examination system for a professional discipline. Viau received their complaints and delegated the matter to his colleague on the executive committee, Michel Robert (subsequently bâtonnier and later Chief Justice of Quebec). Robert negotiated a new system of examinations which is still used today. He credited Viau with having the ability to delegate complex issues to others, and to accept the results with a generosity of spirit.

As bâtonnier, Viau inadvertently contributed to a run-in between the Chief Justice of the Superior Court and a future justice of the Supreme Court of Canada, Morris Fish. The affair grew out of a backlog in the criminal trial courts. In an attempt to reduce the backlog, the Deputy Minister of Justice issued a public letter, with the approval of the Chief Justice, announcing that if an accused elected to be tried by judge and jury, rather than by judge alone, the accused would forfeit their right to bail. The proposal attracted considerable criticism, particularly from one fiery letter in the Montreal Star, written under a pseudonym. The author of the letter denounced the proposal as being contrary to law, as nothing in the Criminal Code suggested that an accused who exercised his right to trial by jury would find his pre-trial liberty restricted. In an attempt to resolve the dispute, a committee was created with representatives from the bench and the bar. Viau appointed Fish, then an up-and-coming young defence counsel, as a member of the committee to represent the interests of the defence bar. What Viau did not know was that Fish was the author of the letter in the Star. At one point in the committee's deliberations, the Chief Justice point-blank demanded of Fish if he was the author of the letter. With a polite smile, Fish replied that the identity of the letter-writer was protected by the tradition of pseudonyms, but he whole-heartedly agreed with the content of the letter.

== Canadian Bar Association ==
=== Early participation in the CBA ===
Viau was active in the Canadian Bar Association throughout his career. He was president of the CBA's municipal law section from 1966 to 1968, and vice-president of the Quebec Branch of the CBA from 1969 to 1970.

=== Presidential term and the Quebec sovereignty issue ===
Viau was national president of the CBA in 1977–78, a time of political turmoil in Canada. The year before, the Parti québécois had won the provincial general election in Quebec and formed the government, on a platform of separation from Canada. At the annual meeting of the CBA in the summer of 1977, the outgoing president, Boyd Ferris, proposed that the CBA should recognise the need for national unity and a strong federal government. A resolution to that effect was introduced by Paul Fraser, the president of the British Columbia branch of the CBA and seconded by Robert Lesage, the president of the Quebec Branch. The resolution proved controversial, since some members of the CBA did not think the organisation should take part in political issues, while members from Quebec thought that the motion was attempting to impose a particular view on the sovereignty issue as a condition of membership in the CBA. After considerable debate and negotiations, the resolution was amended on a motion by Yves Fortier, a past-president of the Quebec Branch, and Bryan Williams, the incoming president of the British Columbia Branch. The amendment removed the language calling for the CBA to support national unity and reject provincial separatism. Instead, the resolution created a committee to study and make recommendations on the Constitution of Canada.

=== CBA Committee on the Constitution ===
==== Mandate and composition ====
The resolution called for the Constitution to be re-written "so as better to meet the aspriations and present-day needs of all the people of Canada and to guarantee the preservation of the historical rights of our two founding cultures." The resolution also set out the mandate for the committee, which was to undertake "the search for a definition of the essential constitutional attributes of a Canadian federalism", with a final report to be presented at the next Annual Meeting of the CBA in 1978. The members of the committee were drawn from each province of Canada, and included two future provincial premiers, a future Supreme Court justice, two future provincial chief justices, and a future Canadian Ambassador to the United Nations.

In addition to Viau, who acted as chairman, the members were:

- John A. Agrios, Edmonton, Alberta, later a judge of the Alberta Court of Queen's Bench
- Douglas McK. Brown, Q.C., Vancouver, British Columbia, a leading civil litigator
- George D. Finlayson, Q.C., Toronto, Ontario, later on the Ontario Court of Appeal
- L. Yves Fortier, Q.C., Montreal, Quebec, later Canada's Ambassador to the United Nations
- Joseph A. Ghiz, Charlottetown, Prince Edward Island, later Premier of Prince Edward Island and then on the Supreme Court of Prince Edward Island
- William L. Hoyt, Q.C., Fredericton, New Brunswick, later Chief Justice of New Brunswick
- Robert Lesage, Q.C., Quebec City, Quebec, later on the Superior Court of Quebec
- David Matas, Winnipeg, Manitoba, a noted civil rights lawyer
- John P. Merrick, Halifax, Nova Scotia
- D.E. (Tom) Gauley, Saskatoon, Saskatchewan, a leading lawyer in Saskatchewan
- Clyde K. Wells, Q.C., Corner Brook, Newfoundland, later Premier of Newfoundland and then Chief Justice of Newfoundland.

The executive vice-chairman and director of research was Gérard V. La Forest, Q.C., of Ottawa, Ontario, later on the Supreme Court of Canada. The Director of Research was Joel E. Fichaud, later a judge of the Nova Scotia Court of Appeal.

The committee had a budget of $250,000. Funding came from the CBA itself, and also from the Donner Canadian Foundation, the Alberta Law Foundation, the British Columbia Law Foundation, and the Ontario Law Foundation.

==== Work of the Committee ====
The members of the committee met nine times over the course of the year, with one final marathon meeting for five days at Charlottetown, Prince Edward Island, the site of the first Confederation Conference in 1864.

As the deadline for the committee report approached, rumours began to fly about the committee's recommendations, particularly the possibility that the committee would call for the abolition of the monarchy. Viau appeared to confirm that speculation several months before the report was released, at a joint meeting of the councils of the Ontario and Quebec Branches of the CBA. Speculation continued right up to the day before the report was released, with Viau stating that he had nothing personally against the monarchy, and noting that even Premier Lévesque had said much the same. However, Viau also commented that the idea of a Canadian head of state "... is really nothing new", noting that a joint Senate-Commons committee had suggested a Canadian head of state some years previously, in 1971.

==== The Committee Report ====
The committee released its report for consideration by the annual meeting of the CBA in Halifax on August 27 to 31, 1978. The report recommended that:

1. A new Constitution be established for Canada;
2. The new Constitution include a Bill of Rights to protect fundamental freedoms, including freedom of religion and of speech, legal protections for the accused in criminal proceedings, and equality;
3. The new Constitution recognise the English and French languages as official languages, both federally and provincially, the right of individuals to use either language, and the right of parents to have their children educated in the language of their choice;
4. The monarchy be abolished, with a new Canadian head of state at the federal level, and new chief executive officers at the provincial level. The federal head of state would be chosen by the House of Commons, and the provincial chief executive officers would be chosen by the provincial legislatures;
5. The Senate be replaced by a new House of the Federation, appointed entirely by the provincial governments. The federal government could appoint individuals who could speak in the House of the Federation, but would not have a vote;
6. The new House of the Federation have an oversight role in matters affecting provincial interests. Certain topics which related to areas of provincial jurisdiction would need an approval from the House of the Federation, on a two-thirds vote, to ensure that there was a national consensus;
7. The Supreme Court of Canada be constitutionally entrenched, along with its composition and powers;
8. The division of powers between the federal parliament and the provincial legislatures keep the same broad outlines as currently established, with some modifications. Some of the changes would be to recognise a greater provincial role in cultural matters; the transfer of the jurisdiction over divorce from the federal government to the provinces; and a reduction in the federal power to legislate for matters of general national concern.
9. The new Constitution have an amending formula which would allow amendments to be made entirely in Canada, ending the role of the British Parliament. The proposed formula would require the assent of the federal Parliament and a majority of the provinces. Amendments would also require the assent of any province which currently or previously had 25% of the national population, effectively giving vetoes to Ontario and Quebec. Amendments would also require the assent of two of the Atlantic provinces, and two of the western provinces, including at least one of the two most populous western provinces (either British Columbia or Alberta).

The federal government had recently released its own draft amendments. Viau indicated before the report was released that he and the other committee members did not see anything in the federal proposals which would lead them to change their recommendations. In particular, Viau said he completely disagreed with the federal proposal that the upper house be chosen half by the federal government and half by the provinces. Earlier that year, with respect to the division of powers, he had said that in his opinion, the provinces had to be given near complete control over cultural and educational matters if Quebec was to stay in Canada. Another member of the committee, John Agrios, commented that the points in contention in their internal discussions were not really where he had expected them: "Language and so forth was not a difficult area, but the Senate was very, very difficult, and we spent a lot of time on the court system and international relations.

== Subsequent professional activities ==
Viau remained active in his profession in his later years. From 1981 to 1992, he served as the President of the Tripartite Committee, composed of representatives from the courts, the provincial Ministry of Justice, and the bar, having been a member of the Committee since 1971. From 1982 to 1998, he was the President of the official provincial legal publishing office, SOQUIJ, which he helped to found during his tenure as bâtonnier. In 1984–1985, Viau served as the Président du Comité sur les structures de la Cour d'appel du Québec.

== Death ==
Viau died in 2003, survived by his wife and two children.

His colleague from the Barreau, Michel Robert, remembered him as a man of warmth and openness, without an ounce of pettiness, albeit with a biting, sarcastic sense of humour. Robert characterised him as having conservative tendencies, but progressive ideas.

== Honours and awards ==
- 1951 - Queen's Counsel
- 1967 - Canadian Centennial Medal
- 1979 - Officer of the Order of Canada
- 1983 - Médaille du Barreau du Québec
- 1986 - Grand Cross of the Maltese Order of Merit
