= Paul D.K. Fraser =

Canadian lawyer (1941–2019)

Paul D.K. Fraser QC

British Columbia Conflict of Interest Commissioner
- In office January 1, 2008 – March 29, 2019
- Preceded by: H.A.D. (Bert) Oliver
- Succeeded by: Lynn Smith

53rd President of the Canadian Bar Association
- In office 1981–1982
- Preceded by: William Cox
- Succeeded by: L. Yves Fortier

President of the Commonwealth Lawyers Association
- In office 1993–1996

President of the International Commission of Jurists (Canadian Section)

President of the British Columbia Branch of the Canadian Bar Association
- In office 1976–1977

Personal details
- Born: 1941 Winnipeg, Manitoba, Canada
- Died: March 29, 2019 (aged 77–78)
- Spouse(s): Georgene, Robin
- Children: 5
- Education: University of Manitoba (BA); University of British Columbia (LL.B)
- Profession: Lawyer

Paul D.K. Fraser QC (1941 – March 29, 2019) was a Canadian lawyer from British Columbia. He served as the Conflict Commissioner for the Legislative Assembly of British Columbia as well as the president of the Canadian Bar Association (1981–1982), the Commonwealth Lawyers Association (1993–1996), and of the Canadian section of the International Commission of Jurists. He also chaired a review of pornography and prostitution laws for the government of Canada.

== Early life and education ==
Fraser graduated from the University of Manitoba in 1961 with a degree of Bachelor of Arts (B.A.). He then attended the University of British Columbia Law School, earning a degree of Bachelor of Laws (LL.B.) in 1964.

== Legal career ==
Called to the Bar of British Columbia in 1965, Fraser developed an extensive litigation practice in both civil and criminal matters, with the firm which eventually became Fraser Milner Casgrain. On six occasions, he was appointed a Special Prosecutor by the Government of British Columbia. He also developed a practice in the area of mediation and arbitration, and continues to be available as a private arbitrator.

Fraser served as a special legal advisor to the then-Minister of Foreign Affairs, Lloyd Axworthy, and made proposals for improved dispute resolution mechanisms for environmental treaty issues with the United States. The federal government also appointed him an Industrial Inquiry Commissioner in the wake of the 1995 railway strike, which was settled by back-to-work legislation. Fraser has also acted as a senior adjudicator in the dispute-resolution process set up to resolve claims arising from the Canadian Indian residential school system.

In 1982, Fraser was appointed Queen's Counsel by the Government of British Columbia. In 2015 he was awarded a Certificate of 50 Years Practising Law by the Law Society of British Columbia.

== Fraser Report on Pornography and Prostitution ==
In 1983, the then-Minister of Justice, Mark MacGuigan, appointed Fraser to chair a committee of inquiry into pornography and prostitution in Canada, along with six other committee members drawn for their range of expertise in the social and criminal issues relating to prostitution. In the Fraser Committee Report, they stated that prostitution was not simply a matter of criminal law, but a complex social problem. They considered changes to the law from three perspectives: increased criminal sanctions; decriminalisation; and government regulation. The committee did not favour any of those options as the sole approach to the issue. Instead, it recommended strengthening criminal restrictions on street prostitution, because of the danger and nuisance aspects, while easing the criminal restrictions on other aspects of prostitution, such as the bawdy house offence. Greater social supports should also be provided, to address the economic factors which might alleviate the situation.

== British Columbia Conflict Commissioner ==
=== Appointment and mandate ===
In 2007, Fraser was appointed as the British Columbia Conflict Commissioner. The position is established by an Act of the Parliament of British Columbia and is a non-partisan officer of the Legislative Assembly of British Columbia. The Commissioner is nominated by the Premier of British Columbia and must be recommended by at least two-thirds of the members of the Legislative Assembly. In Fraser's case, the Assembly's recommendation to appoint him was unanimous.

The Conflict Commissioner has a mandate with three functions: to provide advice to Members of the Legislative Assembly on potential conflicts of interest; to meet annually with each member to review their declarations under the Members' Conflict of Interest Act; and to carry out investigations into complaints of conflicts of interest.

When Fraser was appointed in 2007, the position of Conflict of Interest Commissioner was part-time. However, when his appointment was renewed by the Legislative Assembly in 2015, it was made a full-time position.

=== Allegations of conflict of interest involving Premier Clark ===
==== BC Rail ====
In 2012, John van Dongen, an independent MLA, filed a complaint with the Commissioner's office, alleging that Premier Christy Clark was in a conflict of interest in relation to the sale of BC Rail to Canadian National railway. Shortly after the complaint was filed, it became known that Fraser's son, John Paul Fraser, was an assistant deputy minister in the government and a personal friend of the Premier. Van Dongen asked that Commissioner Fraser not review the allegation himself, as he personally was in a potential conflict. After considering the matter over the weekend, Fraser announced that he would not review the complaint and instead would delegate it to the Conflict of Interest Commissioner for the Northwest Territories, Gerald Gerrand, QC. Fraser had no further involvement in the file, other than ensuring that Gerrand had the necessary resources to investigate the complaint. Gerrand later issued a report which cleared Clark.

==== Exclusive fundraising events and Liberal Party stipend ====
In 2016, it became known that Premier Clark hosted exclusive party fundraising events and received an annual stipend from the British Columbia Liberal Party. David Eby, a New Democratic Party MLA, filed a complaint of conflict of interest with the Commissioner, as did Duff Conacher of Democracy Watch.

This time, Fraser conducted the review of the complaint himself. On May 4, 2016, he released a report which held that Clark was not in a conflict of interest, as the fundraising was not for her personal benefit, but for the benefit of the Liberal Party. As well, the receipt of the stipend was not a conflict of interest.

Eby stated that he did not think when he filed the complaint that Fraser was in a personal conflict because of his son's connection with the Premier, but after the report came out he was reviewing that point.

== British Columbia Information and Privacy Commissioner (Acting) ==
Fraser was also the acting Information and Privacy Commissioner for the first six months of 2010, another independent officer of the Legislative Assembly. The former Commissioner had been appointed the Deputy Attorney General of British Columbia, and a severe backlog had developed while the position was vacant. The Government appointed Fraser on an interim basis while deciding whom to appoint full-time.

During his time in office, he testified before a legislative committee which was reviewing British Columbia's Freedom of Information and Protection of Privacy Act. He opposed the Government's request for broader legislative powers to share personal information within government, arguing that those powers already existed under the current law and did not need to be expanded. He also stated that: "The government had not yet established what we call a 'culture of privacy.' That's not just a buzz word. It's a real expression of concern." Fraser also reminded the committee that he had pushed for freedom of information legislation back in 1976, as president of the British Columbia Branch of the Canadian Bar Association.

== Canadian Bar Association ==
=== President of CBA and BC CBA ===
Fraser has been active both provincially and nationally in the Canadian Bar Association a professional organization for lawyers. He was the president of the British Columbia Branch of the CBA in 1976–1977. In 1981–1982, he served as the national president of the CBA. He is the senior surviving past-president.

During his term as president of the British Columbia Branch, he pressed the provincial government to enact freedom of information and protection of privacy legislation, which would have been the first in Canada.

Fraser was national president when the federal government appointed Bertha Wilson, the first woman justice of the Supreme Court of Canada in 1982. Speaking on behalf of the CBA, Fraser said he welcomed the appointment for two reasons: "First and foremost, as a lawyer and a judge her Ladyship has demonstrated her worthiness to sit on the highest court in Canada. Secondly, the appointment ... involves women in every level of the judicial system and makes the role of women in the administration of justice appropriately complete."

=== CBA Resolution on Canadian Unity ===
During his term as president of the British Columbia branch, Canada was going through a period of considerable political turmoil, caused by the election of the separatist Parti Québécois government in the province of Quebec in the provincial election of 1976. The PQ government's platform called for Quebec to separate from Canada.

At the annual meeting of the CBA in the summer of 1977 the national president, A. Boyd Ferris, called on the CBA to pass a resolution in favour of national unity and a strong federal government, and rejecting separatism. Fraser introduced the resolution, seconded by Robert Lesage, the president of the Quebec branch. The resolution generated considerable debate, as some members did not think the CBA should take a stand on political issues, while some members from Quebec thought the resolution attempted to impose a particular position on the sovereignty issue as a condition of membership in the CBA. Eventually, the resolution was amended on a motion by Yves Fortier, a past-president of the Quebec branch, and seconded by Bryan Williams, the incoming president of the British Columbia branch. The amendment removed the language expressly supporting a strong federal system and rejecting separatism. The result of the amendment was that the CBA established a committee to study the constitutional issues and make recommendations on constitutional reform.

=== Dispute between the Prime Minister and the Chief Justice of Canada ===
In 2014, Fraser was one of eleven past-presidents of the CBA who intervened in a dispute between the Prime Minister of Canada, Stephen Harper, and the Chief Justice of Canada, Beverley McLachlin, over the appointment of Justice Marc Nadon to the Supreme Court of Canada. The Prime Minister criticised the Chief Justice, alleging that she had acted improperly. The CBA past-presidents defended her actions, as did the then-President, Fred Headon.

In the fall of 2013, the federal government appointed Justice Nadon of the Federal Court of Appeal to the Supreme Court. Although he was sworn in, an issue arose whether he was eligible to be appointed under the terms of the Supreme Court Act. In the spring of 2014, the Supreme Court ruled that Justice Nadon was not eligible to be appointed, because he was on the Federal Court of Appeal rather than on a Quebec superior court, as required by the Supreme Court Act. After the Supreme Court's decision, the Prime Minister publicly criticised the Chief Justice, saying that she had behaved improperly in speaking of the qualification issue during a consultation about the appointment some nine months earlier, with the Minister of Justice, Peter MacKay.

Fraser and ten other past-presidents of the CBA then wrote an open letter to The Globe and Mail, criticising the Prime Minister's conduct. They stated: "... these circumstances leave us concerned that the Prime Minister’s statements may intimidate or harm the ability of the Supreme Court of Canada to render justice objectively and fairly – even when the government of Canada chooses to be a litigant before it."

In addition to Fraser, the letter was signed by L. Yves Fortier QC of Montreal; Thomas G. Heintzman QC of Toronto; Daphne Dumont QC of Charlottetown; Simon V. Potter of Montreal; William Johnson QC of Regina; Susan McGrath of Iroquois Falls; Bernard Amyot of Montreal; Guy Joubert of Winnipeg; D. Kevin Carroll, QC of Barrie; and Rod Snow of Whitehorse.

=== Criticism of the location of Victims of Communism memorial ===
In 2015, Fraser was one of seventeen past-presidents of the Canadian Bar Association wrote an open letter to the Globe and Mail, criticising plans to locate a proposed Memorial to the Victims of Communism immediately adjacent to the Supreme Court of Canada.

While not opposing the idea of the monument itself, the group of past-presidents argued that it was inappropriate for an overtly political memorial to be placed adjacent to the Supreme Court, which is politically neutral: "It is ill conceived, however, to add an imposing sculpture signalling a strong political message, controversial or not, literally in the face of the very institution which is the final arbiter in Canada of disputes involving Canadians, the federal and provincial governments, and foreign litigants."

Late in 2015, the federal government announced that it would move the proposed memorial to a different location.

== Participation in international lawyers' groups ==
=== Commonwealth Lawyers Association ===
Fraser served a three-year term, from 1993 to 1996, as president of the Commonwealth Lawyers Association, an international association which links lawyers from the various countries of the Commonwealth of Nations.

=== International Commission of Jurists (Canadian Section) ===
Fraser was also the president of the Canadian Section of the International Commission of Jurists, an organization dedicated to preserving the rule of law, the independence of the judiciary and human rights around the world.

== Corporate and not-for-profit directorships ==
Fraser has also served on the boards of directors of several corporations and not-for profit organizations, including the Canadian Broadcasting Corporation and VIA Rail. He also sat on the boards of the University of Winnipeg Foundation, the Judicial Council of the Tsawwassen First Nation, the Canadian Foundation for Legal Research, the Canada-United States Law Institute and Cuso International.

== Personal life ==
Fraser was married twice and had 5 children. He died on March 29, 2019, at the age of 78.

== Honours ==
- 1982: Queen's Counsel, British Columbia
- 1992: Fellow of the American College of Trial Lawyers
- 2005: Law Society of British Columbia: Certificate of Fifty Years Practising Law.
- Honorary Doctor of Laws (LL.D.) from the University of Winnipeg
