= Yves Fortier (ambassador) =

Canadian lawyer and diplomat (born 1935)

The Honourable L. Yves Fortier PC CC OQ KC

Canadian Ambassador to the United Nations
- In office August 1988 – December 1991
- Preceded by: Stephen Lewis
- Succeeded by: Louise Fréchette

President of the United Nations Security Council
- In office October 1, 1989 – October 31, 1989
- Preceded by: Paulo Nogueira Batista, Brazil
- Succeeded by: Li Luye, People's Republic of China

54th President of the Canadian Bar Association
- In office January 1, 1982 – January 1, 1983
- Preceded by: Paul D.K. Fraser
- Succeeded by: Robert H. McKercher

Personal details
- Born: Louis Yves Fortier; September 11, 1935 (age 91) Quebec City, Quebec, Canada
- Spouse: Carol Eaton
- Education: Université de Montréal (BA); McGill University (BCL); University of Oxford (BLitt)
- Occupation: Lawyer, arbitrator and diplomat

Louis Yves Fortier PC CC OQ KC (born September 11, 1935) is a Canadian diplomat, trial and appellate lawyer, arbitrator and corporate director. He served as the Canadian Ambassador to the United Nations from August 1988 to December 1991. In August 2013, he became a member of the Security Intelligence Review Committee and the Queen's Privy Council for Canada. He also served as the national president of the Canadian Bar Association from 1982 to 1983.

== Early life and family ==
Fortier was born in Quebec City in 1935. His father was a regional service agent for passengers on the Canadian Pacific Railway. After Fortier earned his Bachelor of Arts degree from the Université de Montréal in 1955 and was considering a legal career, his father encouraged him to apply to the law school at McGill University in Montreal to improve his English. At that time, McGill taught in English only. When Fortier said he was worried about learning law in English, his father said: "Yves, les anglophones assis à côté de toi, ils n'ont jamais fait de droit en anglais non plus". ("Yves, the anglophones sitting beside you will have never learned law in English either.") Fortier applied to McGill and was accepted, and then successfully persuaded the McGill faculty that he should be able to sit his examinations in French. He graduated with a Bachelor of Civil Law degree from McGill in 1958.

While at McGill, Fortier met his future wife, Carol Eaton, who was studying for her Bachelor of Arts degree. Her father encouraged Fortier to apply for a Rhodes scholarship following his graduation from McGill, although Fortier jokes that "Je pense qu'il voulait m'éloigner de sa fille" ("I think he wanted to get me away from his daughter").

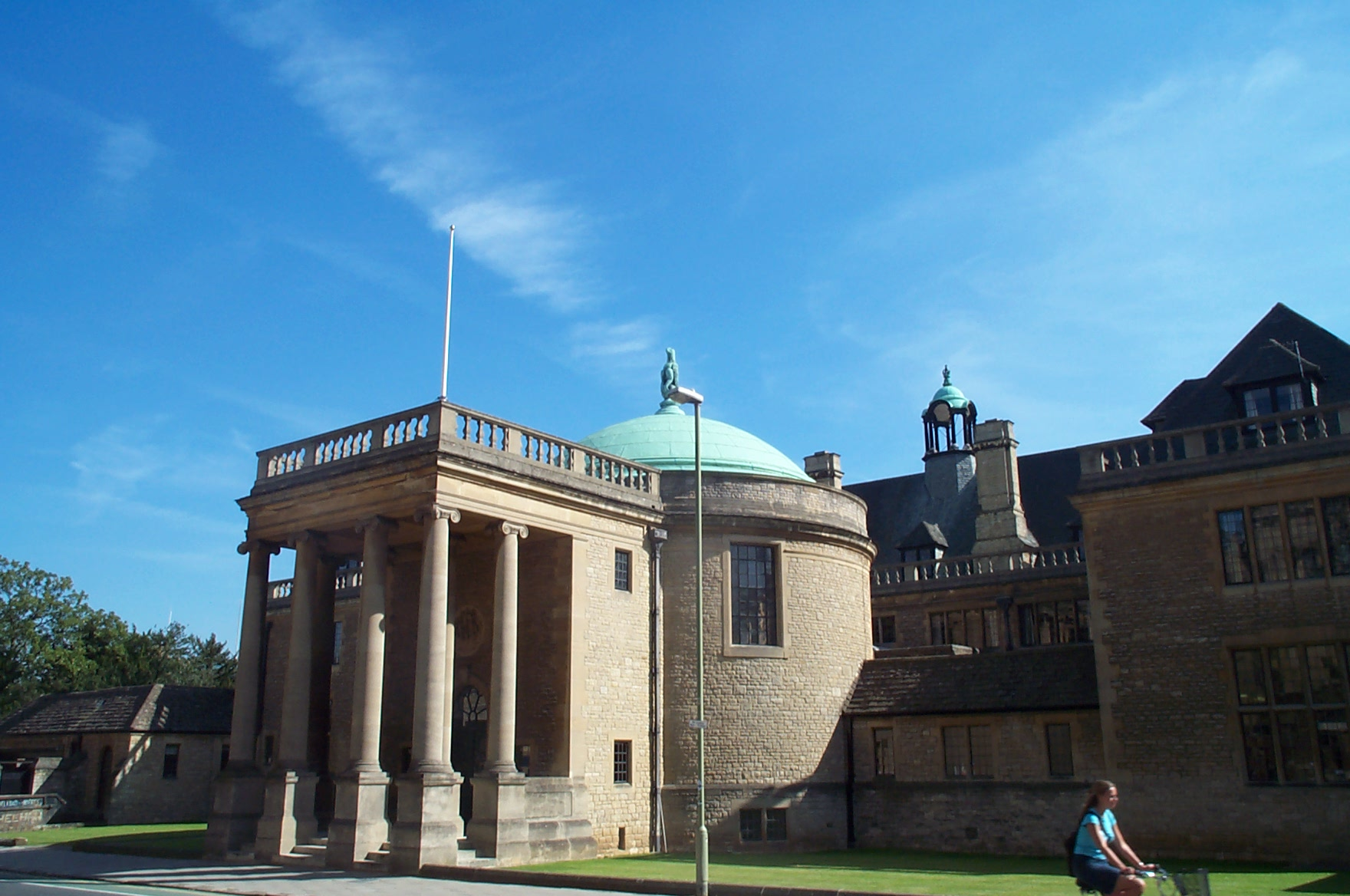
Rhodes House, Oxford

Fortier was awarded a Rhodes scholarship in 1958, for two years. At that time, Rhodes scholars were required to be single and to live in a college at Oxford. He and Carol deferred their marriage for a year, with his commitment to her that he would try to get the regulation changed. In his first major advocacy, he and some other Rhodes scholars in similar situations were able to persuade the Prefect of Rhodes House to change the rule. He and Carol married in 1959. The next year, he received his Bachelor of Letters degree from the University of Oxford.

Fortier insisted with his wife that their children be educated in French. He believes that it is extremely important to protect the French language in Quebec.

Fortier keeps fit with tennis, skiing, and especially cross-country skiing. He and his wife travel extensively.

== Personal reputation ==
Brian Mulroney, Fortier's friend, former law partner, and former Prime Minister of Canada, has said that Fortier was consistently considered one of the top three courtroom lawyers in Canada. Fortier has said that he does not like being called an avocat (advocate) and prefers the term plaideur, meaning one who seeks to persuade. One of his other colleagues has described him: "Bien des plaideurs oublient que leur objectif est de convaincre. Ils parlent fort, ils sont agressifs, mais ça ne marche pas. Yves, lui, est persuasif : il a de l'humour, des idées, du charme, il est rigoureux" ("A lot of lawyers forget that their objective is to convince. They speak loudly, they are aggressive, but that doesn't work. But Yves, he is persuasive: he is humorous, he has ideas and charm, and he is rigorous").

Fortier was appointed Queen's Counsel in 1976. In 2007, he was appointed Avocat émérite (Ad.E.) by the Barreau du Québec, one of the first recipients of the award.

In 2002, while serving on the board of Nortel, Fortier was the subject of a conflict of interest controversy as he both sat on the board and provided billed legal services to the company. He stepped down from the board in 2005 during an accounting scandal.

Fortier is now international arbitrator. One of his former colleagues from Ogilvy Renault, Pierre Bienvenu, has stated that he is one of the most in demand international arbitrators in the world.

He has been described as humble, treating junior lawyers with respect, and always willing to share credit on major files with other people who have worked on them with him.

== Political views ==
Fortier has described himself as both a Quebec nationalist and a committed federalist. Growing up, he saw the domination of the anglophone minority in Quebec. For instance, his father could not rise above a certain position in his career because he was francophone. At the same time, he rejected the sovereigntist approach of René Lévesque. Mulroney has joked that Fortier has only one defect: being a Liberal.

== Legal career ==
=== Fifty years at Ogilvy Renault ===
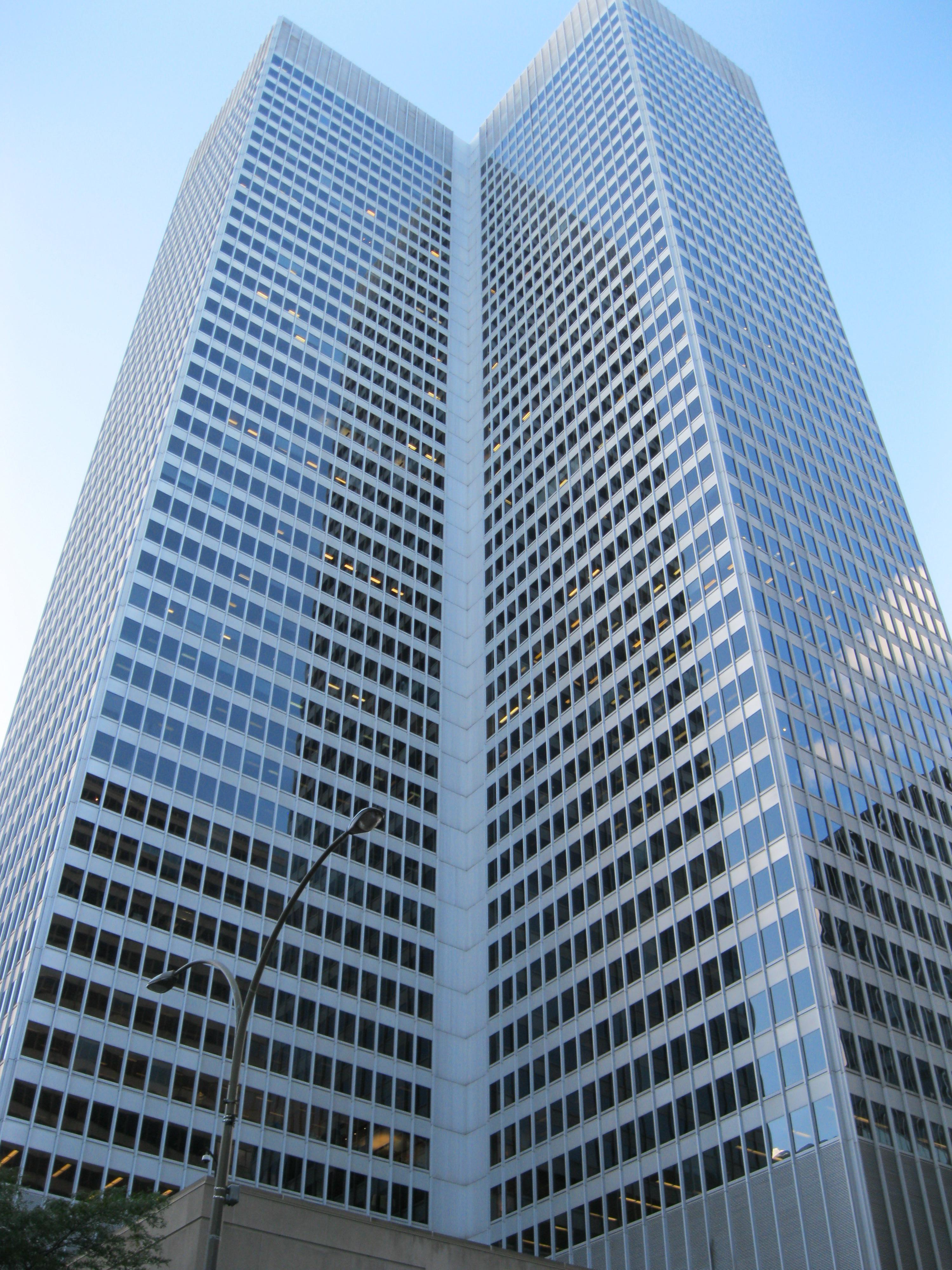
Place Ville-Marie, Montreal, where Fortier has his office.

In 1961, he was called to the Quebec bar. He joined the well-known firm of Ogilvy Renault, where he practised for half a century. While at Ogilvy Renault, he developed a friendship with another young lawyer, Brian Mulroney, who went on to be Prime Minister of Canada. Fortier served as Chairman of Ogilvy Renault from 1992 to 2009. He left the firm on good terms in 2011 to establish a solo international arbitration practice.

Fortier developed an active civil litigation practice, both within Canada and internationally. He acted in a wide range of litigation matters: commercial law, bankruptcy cases, tax law, competition law, and divorces all came within his practice. He appeared before the Supreme Court of Canada on twenty-five cases, including lead counsel for the Government of Canada on one of the most important Supreme Court cases, the Reference re Secession of Quebec. He also argued before international arbitration panels, including the International Court of Justice. He has represented Canada in boundary disputes with the United States over the boundary with Maine, and with France in relation to St Pierre and Miquelon, as well as fisheries disputes with the United States. He has been counsel to several royal commissions and public inquiries, as well as counsel to the Government of Quebec in relations with the Cree Nation in Quebec.

On November 15, 2010, Ogilvy Renault LLP joined with London-based law firm Norton Rose. In 2011, citing potential conflicts of interest posed by the expansion of the firm's clientele, Fortier left Norton Rose and established his own firm in order to continue his career as an international arbitrator independently.

=== Declined appointment to Supreme Court of Canada ===
In 1988, Fortier was contacted by his old law partner, now Prime Minister Mulroney, who offered him an appointment to the Supreme Court of Canada. Fortier turned it down, explaining later: "Juge à la Cour suprême, ça n'était pas dans mon ADN. Vivre comme un moine. Fréquenter les mêmes huit personnes. Sans pouvoir lâcher son fou. Non merci." ("Judge on the Supreme Court, that wasn't in my DNA. Living like a monk. Hanging out with the same eight people. Not being able to let loose. No thanks.") Although the fact that he declined an appointment is now public knowledge, he has said that he would have preferred that the story never have leaked out.

== Canadian Ambassador to the United Nations ==
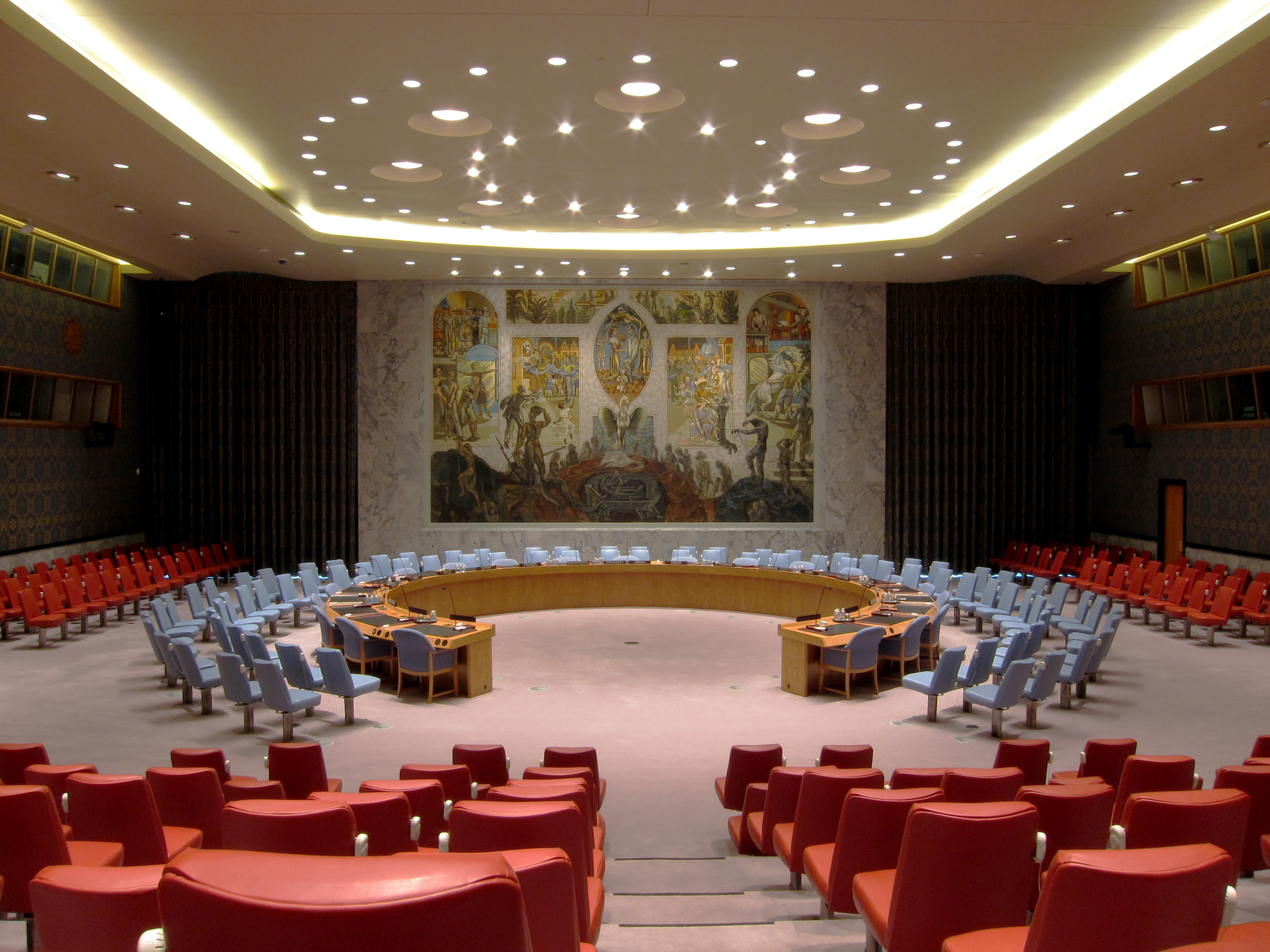
United Nations Security Council Chamber

After Fortier turned down the appointment to the Supreme Court, Mulroney instead offered to appoint him as Canada's Ambassador and Permanent Representative to the United Nations. Fortier accepted the position and served for four years, from 1988 to 1992. From 1989 until 1990, he was also Canada's representative to the UN Security Council and in October 1989 was the President of the Security Council. Fortier was Canada's principal delegate to four sessions of the General Assembly, including serving as Vice-President at one of those sessions.

The role of ambassador at the United Nations was much more to his taste than a judicial appointment would have been. He was constantly using his skills as an advocate and mediator, advancing Canada's position while responding to initiatives from the ambassadors of other countries. He also acknowledged that his personal connection to Mulroney was of great assistance. He summed up his term as being at the right place at the right time: "During my term in New York, the Berlin Wall came down, the Soviet Union broke up, we went through the first Gulf War, Nelson Mandela was released — how wonderful it was to meet him! Let's say that all this gave me exposure to some outstanding matters."

Five years after his term as ambassador ended, Fortier was invited to give the annual O.D. Skelton Lecture organized by the federal Department of Foreign Affairs (now Global Affairs Canada). In his address, he gave a retrospective on his time at the UN and his opinion on the value of the organization. He concluded that the UN served an increasingly important role in the international community. In his opinion, international issues are too large and too complex for any one nation to solve. Multilateral solutions are necessary, and the UN provides the avenue for such solutions to be found. Fortier also emphasized that Canada has an important role to play at the UN: Canada's views were solicited and did count. Fortier rejected the popular myth that the UN is mainly dominated by dictators and petty tyrants. He also suggested that Canada's participation in the UN helps to free Canada from dominance by the United States. Overall, Fortier said that he had become almost a missionary in speaking for the good played by the UN.

== Arbitration career ==
=== Becomes international arbitrator ===
After his term as Canada's Ambassador to the United Nations, Fortier decided he would concentrate on acting as an arbitrator in international commercial matters, rather than returning to his civil litigation practice. Through his firm, he made contacts with some of the leading arbitrators in the United Kingdom, which led to him being appointed the chair of a panel on a major arbitration concerning the Channel Tunnel. From that point on, he focused on international arbitrations.

=== Positions held with arbitration organisations ===
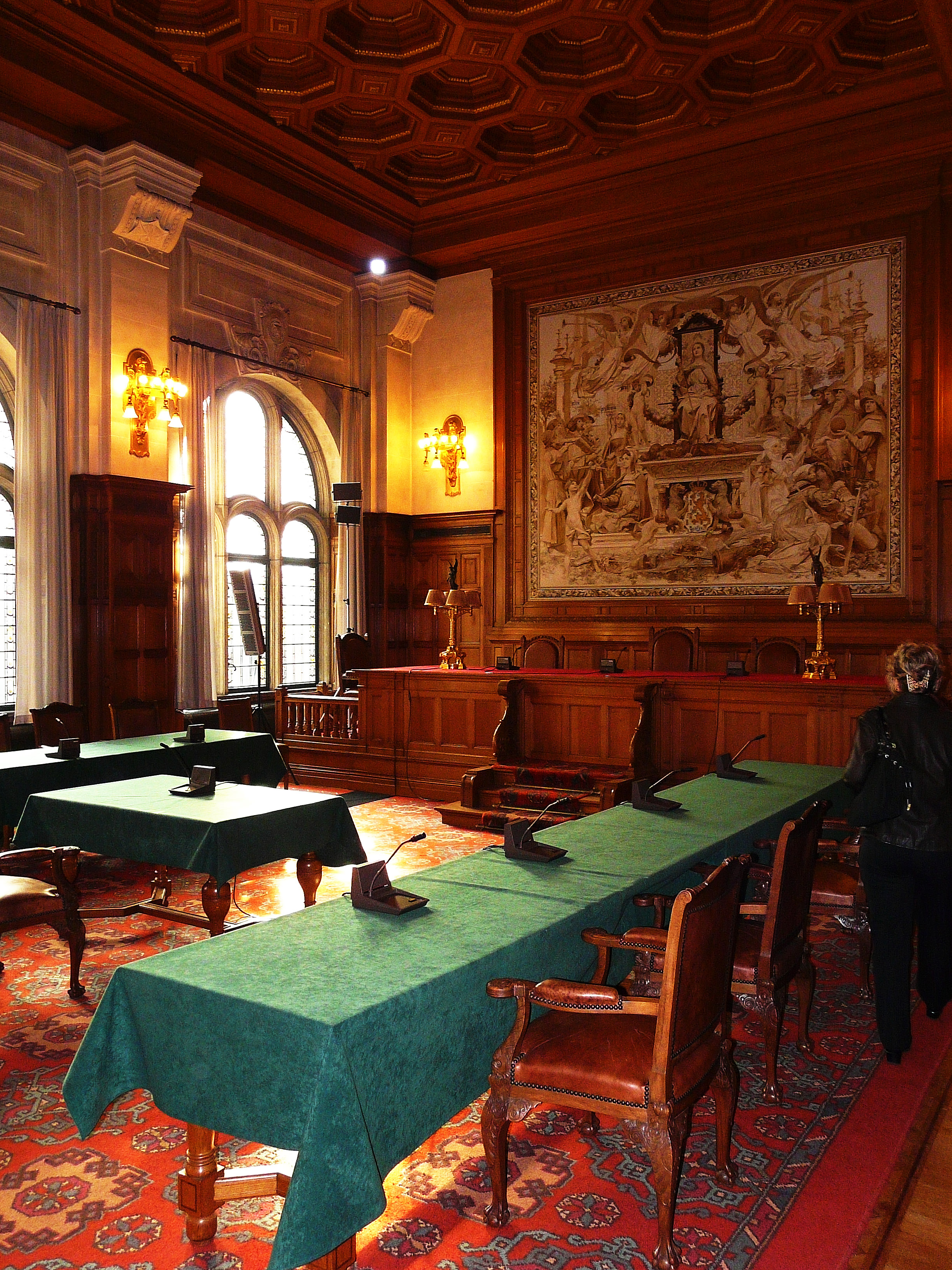
Permanent Court of Arbitration courtroom.

From 1984 to 1989, Fortier was a member of the Permanent Court of Arbitration located at The Hague, Netherlands. From 1998 to 2001, he served as President of the London Court of International Arbitration.

After leaving Ogilvy Renault, in 2012 Fortier joined Arbitration Place in Toronto and is currently a Member Arbitrator. He is also a member of 20 Essex Street in London, a commercial barristers and arbitrators chambers.

In June 2012, Fortier was appointed chair of the World Bank Group's Sanctions Board in order to help combat corruption and fraud in projects financed by the World Bank.

=== Hockey Hall of Fame inquiry ===
In 1993, Fortier was asked to investigate a controversy at the Hockey Hall of Fame. The outgoing president of the National Hockey League, Gil Stein, had been elected to the Hall, but rumours arose that he had put undue pressure to ensure his induction. Gary Bettman, the commissioner of the NHL, retained Fortier and an American lawyer, Arnold Burns, former Deputy Attorney General of the United States, to review the issue. In their report, they concluded that Stein had "improperly manipulated the process" and "created the false appearance and illusion" that the owner of the Los Angeles Kings, Bruce McNall, had put Stein's name forward. Stein denied this suggestion and argued that it had been McNall's idea. Nonetheless, the upshot was that Stein withdrew his nomination.

=== Yukos arbitration ===
Fortier was the presiding member of the arbitration panel in the Yukos arbitration, which resulted in the largest award ever made by an international arbitration panel. (The other two members of the panel were Arbitrators Charles Poncet and Stephen M. Schwebel.)

The arbitration involved a major dispute between the shareholders of Yukos, a Russian energy company, and the government of Russia. The shareholders argued that the Russian government had improperly expropriated the company, allegedly to satisfy unpaid back-taxes. The arbitration was argued under the Energy Charter Treaty. In 2009, the panel held that it had jurisdiction to hear the complaint.

In 2014, the panel ruled on the merits of the claim and ruled in favour of the shareholders. The panel awarded more than US$50 billion to the shareholders, the largest award ever made by an international arbitration panel. However, Russia then applied to the District Court of The Hague to have the awards set aside. In 2016, the District Court ruled that the panel did not have jurisdiction under the Energy Charter Treaty, and set aside the award. It is now under appeal to The Hague Court of Appeal for a full de novo hearing, which could take several years.

== Security Intelligence Review Committee ==
On August 8, 2013, Fortier was appointed to a five-year term on the Security Intelligence Review Committee, the federal watchdog over the Canadian Security Intelligence Service. For this reason, he was sworn in as a member of the Queen's Privy Council for Canada on the same day.

In 2014, the Committee announced that Fortier would chair a panel conducting an inquiry into a complaint that CSIS had spied on citizens conducting peaceful protests over the proposed Keystone oil pipeline. That in turn triggered a request from the British Columbia Civil Liberties Association, one of the parties to the complaint, that Fortier recuse himself because he had formerly sat on the board of Trans Canada Pipelines, which was now one of the proponents of the project, and also held a large number of shares in that company. However, Fortier declined to recuse himself and the hearing went ahead as scheduled in Vancouver in 2015.

== Canadian Bar Association ==
=== Leadership positions ===
Fortier has been active in the Canadian Bar Association throughout his career, at both the provincial and national levels. From 1975 to 1976, he was the president of the Quebec Branch of the CBA. Then, from 1982 to 1983, he was the national president of the CBA.

=== The CBA and the constitutional debate ===
The mid-1970s were a turbulent time in Canadian and Quebec politics. Fortier and the CBA played a part in the constitutional debate triggered by the election of the separatist Parti québécois government of René Lévesque in the provincial election of 1976.

At the national meeting of the CBA in 1977, following the election of the PQ the previous year, the outgoing national president, Boyd Ferris, proposed that the CBA should declare itself in support of national unity and a strong federal government. A resolution to that effect was introduced by Paul Fraser, the president of the British Columbia Branch of the CBA and seconded by Robert Lesage, the president of the Quebec Branch.

The resolution was controversial, because some members did not think the CBA should take a position on a political issue, while members from Quebec objected that the resolution was attempting to impose a particular view of the sovereignty issue as a condition of membership in the CBA. There were considerable debates and negotiations on the proposed resolution, which resulted in an amendment being moved by Fortier and Bryan Williams, the incoming president of the BC Branch. The amendments removed the language calling for the CBA to support national unity and to reject provincial separatism. Instead, the resolution called on the CBA to create a Committee on the Constitution which would consider the constitutional issues facing the country and prepare a detailed report on possible amendments to the Constitution of Canada. The CBA passed the amended version of the resolution as proposed by Fortier and Williams.

The resolution called for the Constitution to be re-written "so as better to meet the aspriations and present-day needs of all the people of Canada and to guarantee the preservation of the historical rights of our two founding cultures." The resolution also set out the mandate for the Committee, which was to undertake "the search for a definition of the essential constitutional attributes of a Canadian federalism", with a final report to be presented at the next Annual Meeting of the CBA in 1978. Following the passage of the resolution, the new president of the CBA, Jacques Viau, set up the Committee. The members were drawn from each province of Canada, and included two future provincial premiers, a future Supreme Court justice, two future provincial chief justices. Fortier was the member from Quebec.

The Committee released its report at the next annual meeting of the CBA at Halifax in 1978. The Committee made wide-ranging recommendations for constitutional change, including a completely new constitution, abolishing the monarchy, changing the Senate, entrenching language rights and a bill of rights, and changing the balance of powers between the federal government and the provinces.

=== Dispute between the Prime Minister and the Chief Justice of Canada ===
In 2014, Fortier was one of eleven past-presidents of the CBA who intervened in a dispute between the Prime Minister of Canada, Stephen Harper, and the Chief Justice of Canada, Beverley McLachlin, over the appointment of Justice Marc Nadon to the Supreme Court of Canada. The Prime Minister criticised the Chief Justice, alleging that she had acted improperly. The CBA past-presidents defended her actions, as did the then-President, Fred Headon.

In the fall of 2013, the federal government appointed Justice Nadon of the Federal Court of Appeal to the Supreme Court. Although he was sworn in, an issue arose whether he was eligible to be appointed under the terms of the Supreme Court Act. In the spring of 2014, the Supreme Court ruled that Justice Nadon was not eligible to be appointed, because he was on the Federal Court of Appeal rather than on a Quebec superior court, as required by the Supreme Court Act. After the Supreme Court's decision, the Prime Minister publicly criticised the Chief Justice, saying that she had behaved improperly in speaking of the qualification issue during a consultation about the appointment some nine months earlier, with the Minister of Justice, Peter MacKay.

Fortier and ten other past-presidents of the CBA then wrote an open letter to The Globe and Mail, criticising the Prime Minister's conduct. They stated: "... these circumstances leave us concerned that the Prime Minister's statements may intimidate or harm the ability of the Supreme Court of Canada to render justice objectively and fairly – even when the government of Canada chooses to be a litigant before it."

In addition to Fortier, the letter was signed by Paul D.K. Fraser, Q.C. of Vancouver; Thomas G. Heintzman, Q.C. of Toronto; Daphne Dumont, Q.C. of Charlottetown; Simon V. Potter of Montreal; William Johnson, Q.C. of Regina; Susan McGrath of Iroquois Falls; Bernard Amyot of Montreal; Guy Joubert of Winnipeg; D. Kevin Carroll, Q.C. of Barrie; and Rod Snow of Whitehorse.

=== Criticism of the location of Victims of Communism memorial ===
In 2015, Fortier was one of seventeen past-presidents of the Canadian Bar Association who wrote an open letter to the Globe and Mail, criticising plans to locate a proposed Memorial to the Victims of Communism immediately adjacent to the Supreme Court of Canada.

While not opposing the idea of the monument itself, the group of past-presidents argued that it was inappropriate for an overtly political memorial to be placed adjacent to the Supreme Court, which is politically neutral: "It is ill conceived, however, to add an imposing sculpture signalling a strong political message, controversial or not, literally in the face of the very institution which is the final arbiter in Canada of disputes involving Canadians, the federal and provincial governments, and foreign litigants."

In addition to Fortier, the letter was signed by Paul D.K. Fraser, Q.C. of Vancouver; Wayne Chapman, Q.C. of Saint John; J.J. Camp, Q.C. of Vancouver; Thomas G. Heintzman, Q.C. of Toronto; Gordon F. Proudfoot, Q.C. of Dartmouth; Russell Lusk, Q.C. of Vancouver; Daphne Dumont, Q.C. of Charlottetown; Simon V. Potter of Montreal; Susan T. McGrath of Iroquois Falls; Brian A. Tabor, Q.C. of Halifax; Bernard Amyot of Montreal; J. Guy Joubert of Winnipeg; D. Kevin Carroll, Q.C, of Barrie; Rod Snow of Whitehorse; Trinda L. Ernst, Q.C. of Kentville; and Robert Brun, Q.C. of Vancouver.

Late in 2015, the federal government announced that it would move the proposed memorial to a different location.

== Corporate career ==
Fortier was also active in business affairs, and he was involved with several major corporations. From 1997 to 2006, he was Governor (company chairman) of the Hudson's Bay Company, North America's oldest company (established by English royal charter in 1670). Fortier was also Chairman of the Board of Directors of the aluminum company Alcan Inc. from 2002 to 2007, prior to its acquisition by Rio Tinto, becoming Rio Tinto Alcan. He also served as a director of several other publicly traded corporations, including Royal Bank of Canada, Trans Canada Pipelines Limited, Dupont Canada Inc., Westinghouse Canada Inc., Manufacturers Life Insurance Company and Nortel.

== Charitable donations ==
In 2009, Fortier set up an entrance scholarship and made a substantial donation to fund a lecturer series at McGill Law School. The L. Yves Fortier Entrance Scholarship is an annual $10,000 scholarship for a first year law student who displays a commitment to bilingualism, as Fortier himself did as a law student. The scholarship is funded by a donation of $200,000 which Fortier gave to the law school.

In addition, Fortier gave a donation of $50,000 to fund the John E.C. Brierley Memorial Lectures. In 2003, Fortier had been the first speaker in the lecture series, which was named after a former dean of McGill Law School who worked in the area of arbitration.

These donations came just two months after aluminium company Rio Tinto Alcan had made a donation of $3 million to endow a position in honour of Fortier, the former chairman of Alcan. The L. Yves Fortier Chair in International Arbitration and International Commercial Law commemorated Fortier's leadership in the field of arbitration.

Also in 2009, the firm and partners at Ogilvy Renault gave a combined gift of $1 million to the McGill Law School, to support the Ogilvy Renault Faculty Scholars in Arbitration in Commercial Law. Fortier's personal share of the donation was $250,000.

== Honours ==
- 1976 - Conseil en loi de la reine (Queen's Counsel), appointed by the Government of Québec (Gazette Officielle du Québec (No. 27, pg 5683, 3 July 1976))
- 1984 - Officer of the Order of Canada, for his leadership in the Canadian Bar Association and his contributions to Montreal community organisations.
- 1991 - Companion of the Order of Canada: promotion within the Order to recognise his contributions to national unity and service to Canada as Ambassador to the UN and representing Canada in international arbitrations.
- 2006 - Officer of the National Order of Quebec.
- 2007 - Avocat émérite (Ad.E.), appointed by the Barreau du Québec.
- 2008 - Walter S. Tarnopolsky Award, awarded jointly by the Canadian Bar Association and the International Commission of Jurists (Canada).
- 2008 - Docteur en études internationales honoris causa, Université Laval.
- recipient of six honorary degrees from major universities in Canada.

Diplomatic posts
Preceded by Stephen Lewis	Canadian Ambassador to the United Nations; August 1988 – December 1991	Succeeded by Louise Fréchette
