= Lachi (artist) =

American musician

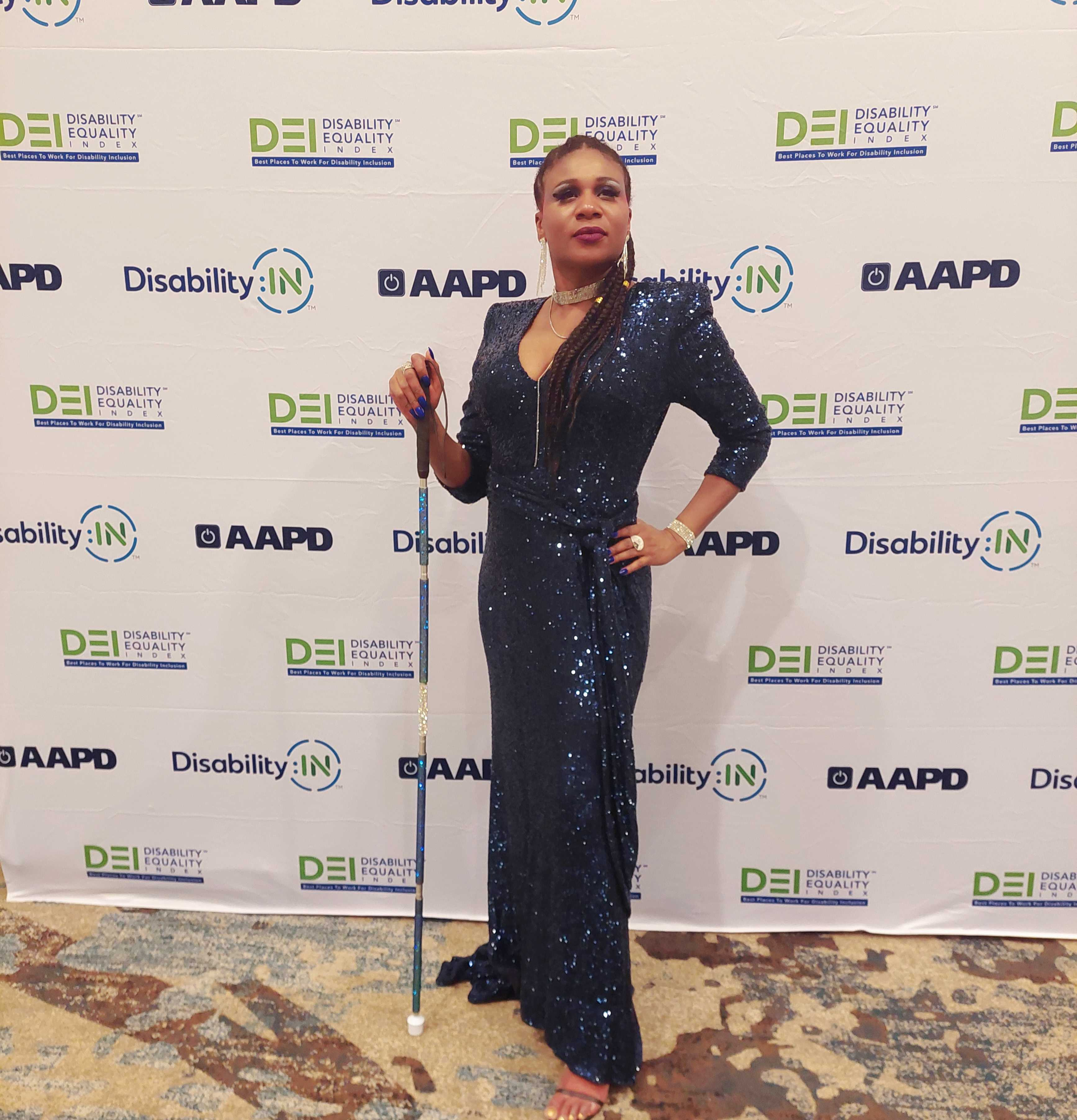

Background information
- Origin: New York City, United States; Towson, Maryland, United States
- Genres: Pop, dance
- Occupations: Singer, disability advocate, media personality, author, touring performer, executive
- Instruments: Vocals, piano
- Labels: EMI, Caroline Distribution
- Website: www.lachimusic.com

Lachi (whose legal name is Lachi Music) is an American recording artist, songwriter, touring performer, record producer, media personality, author, and disability culture advocate based in New York City. Lachi's music is often described as pop or dance music. Lachi is also the founder and CEO of RAMPD.

== Early life ==
Lachi was born in Maryland to Nigerian immigrant parents. Her mother is Dr. Marcellina Offoha, an author and academic. Growing up, she moved around frequently and lived in places including upstate New York, West Philadelphia and North Carolina. She is legally blind due to coloboma.

Lachi attended the University of North Carolina at Chapel Hill where she created the all female a cappella group The UNC Cadence. She then moved to New York City to embark upon her music and writing careers while studying music at New York University. Apart from obtaining side music gigs, she worked at the New York District's United States Army Corps of Engineers.

== Career ==
=== Music career ===
Lachi was spotted performing at an unofficial South by Southwest showcase by Fanatic Records/EMI, who signed her for one album. On July 27, 2010, her self-titled album Lachi was released, which included the single "We Can Fly". During this time, Lachi was featured on Oprah Radio, CW and NPR, and performed at PrideFest (Milwaukee), where she opened for Patti LaBelle.

Lachi later collaborated with Israeli World Music producer Zafrir Ifrach to create the Mediterranean-infused Dance track "Dalale" which garnered over a million views on YouTube in August 2016. She then teamed up with Trend Def studios to co-write and co-produce the song "Rude" which features Snoop Dogg. In 2017 after releasing the Dance / Hip Hop crossover track "Living A Lie" featuring Styles P, she collaborated with Markus Schulz on a song titled "Far" which Schulz placed on his 2018 Trance music album, We Are The Light. The song was also chosen by DJ Armin van Buuren for his mix album A State of Trance Year Mix 2019. In 2019, she wrote and performed Go with Drum and Bass producer Maduk which was featured on several gaming platforms.

In March 2020, Lachi received her second Independent Music Awards nomination for her a cappella arrangement of the song Money by Cardi B. Throughout 2021, Lachi's music career and advocacy work began to overlap, and by March 2022, Lachi received a grant from the Pop Culture Collaborative, to create and release Dance-pop single "Black Girl Cornrows" a song about Self-expression and Visual description written, performed and produced by Lachi, co-produced by Black Caviar (duo) and featuring Yvie Oddly and QuestionATL. By June 2022, Lachi was elected to Board Governor by the The Recording Academy New York Chapter voting membership and appointed the chapter's DREAM Ambassador.

Lachi released the anthemic alternative pop song "Lift Me Up" in July 2023 in memorial of mentor and friend, disability rights activist Judy Heumann, July being Disability Pride Month. The song, in collaboration with James Ian and featuring Gaelynn Lea, debuted on MTV.com, peaking at number 29 on the Adult Contemporary Mediabase charts; and the music video, a high-production piece spotlighting American Sign Language, Audio description and other forms of Disability culture, Disability art, featured Amber Galloway, Ali Stroker and other notable talent and saw support from Coldplay and Google. The song received a Shorty Award, a Diversity in Cannes Award, and was an International Songwriting Competition winner.

In 2024, Lachi released "Mad Different", a 4-part acoustic concert series featuring collaborations with artists from varying counter-culture communities. Filmed in New York's Amazon Music studios and supported by the Pop Culture Collaborative, New Music USA, and Wave Financial, the video series featured songs like "Out of the Dark," "That Kinda Black" and "Diseducation" with ASL performance and audio-description by special guests Imani Barbarin, Tiffany Yu, Spencer West, and Molly Burke.

By June 2025, Lachi was elected to the Recording Academy's National Board of Trustees and named in the 2025 Billboard Pride List, honoring music industry movers and shakers.

The Colors in my Mind, a soulful New Age album by artist Chris Redding highlighting themes of Neurodiversity, was co-produced by Redding and Lachi and received a GRAMMY nomination November 2025.

After releasing her book and best selling audiobook I Identify as Blind January of 2026 (Penguin Random House), Lachi recorded her second studio album Magnificent and released it in July of 2026 (Platoon), co-produced with Lucy Kalantari and Andrew & Polly. The Family Music album celebrating neurodivergence and disability with anthemic, pop/hip hop songs, featured over seventy collaborators with and without varying conditions, including Lisa Loeb, Raul Midón, Matthew Whitaker, Mandy Harvey, Alphabet Rockers, Dom Kelly, 123 Andrés, Wawa Snipe, Charu Suri, and more musicians, writers, and activists.

=== Disability advocacy ===
Lachi began speaking and performing regularly at Disability Pride events and festivals in 2017. promoting disability representation and inclusion in media, By 2020, the New York Times listed Lachi as one of the "28 Ways to Learn About Disability Culture."

In March 2021, Lachi launched "The Off Beat," a YouTube series chronicling her journey from low vision to no vision. In August 2021, Lachi was dubbed "a foot-soldier for disability pride" by Forbes Magazine. Later that year, she established the global consultancy and member network RAMPD (Recording Artists and Music Professionals with Disabilities) which works with notable music entities, firms and organizations like Netflix and Live Nation to amplify Disability culture within the music industry while empowering working music creators and professionals with disabilities. Starting in 2022, RAMPD began partnering with the Recording Academy to help make the Grammy Awards more accessible: working to add a visibly ramped dais, Sign language interpreters, live captioning, Audio description, and American Sign Language on the red carpet.

Throughout 2021 and 2022, Lachi established herself as a go-to voice on disability advocacy in music, speaking with and performing at the White House, the United Nations, the Kennedy Center, Lincoln Center, and the BBC, among other notable appearances. By 2023, Lachi gained recognition for her work bridging disability and pop culture, making numerous appearances as an artist, expert and personality, including on Good Morning America, The Breakfast Club, TIME and in two Google accessibility commercials. In November of that year, Lachi presented at TEDx Cherry Creek, speaking and performing original songs discussing disability identity and pride.

In February 2024, Lachi was named a 2024 Woman of the Year by USA Today. In October of that year, Lachi appeared as the host for the Webby Award winning PBS American Masters series Renegades (a digital series showcasing the contributions to American culture of unsung heroes with disabilities). In November 2024, Lachi was named an ADCOLOR Innovator of the Year for her advocacy and work with RAMPD.

In June 2025, Lachi was named in Forbes' inaugural Accessibility 100 List, honoring leaders and innovators in accessibility.

== Fashion ==
Lachi popularized her glam canes concept in 2021, when she began bejeweling her mobility white cane with rhinestones matching designer outfits in celebration of accessibility. Since 2023, Lachi has walked the GRAMMY Awards red carpet wearing elegant dresses and matching bedazzled glam canes, and has appeared at numerous galas and red carpets sporting her canes, including the Barbie (film) pink carpet premiere with a pink bejeweled glam cane.

== Awards and nominations ==
Year	Nominated Work	Category	Award	Result
2020	Money (A cappella)	Independent Music Award Best A Cappella Song	Independent Music Awards	Nominated
2021	The Off Beat: Going Blind and Staying Fabulous	Best A Web Series	Top Short Film Festival	Won
2022	RAMPD	Libera Awards Humanitarian Award	American Association of Independent Music	Nominated
2022	Community leadership	Honoree	Diversability D30 Disability Impact List	Won
2023	RAMPD	Zero Project Award	United Nations Zero Project	Won
2023	Media and Entertainment	Leading Women Honoree	Ad Age	Won
2023	Community Leadership	Lead On Award	Access Living	Won
2023	Outstanding Contributions to the Art	Habey Awards for Outstanding Contributions to the Arts	New York Carolina Club	Won
2023	Entrepreneurship	Judith Heumann Innovation & Entrepreneurship Award	2gether International	Won
2024	Lift Me Up	Song for Social Causes Award	International Songwriting Competition	Won
2024	Lift Me Up	Bronze Award, Audience Honoree	SHORTY Awards	Won
2024	Disability Advocacy	Edith Prentiss Award	Disability Rights Advocates (DRA)	Won
2024	Achievements	2024 Woman of the Year	USA Today	Won
2024	Achievements	2024 Innovator of the Year	ADCOLOR	Won
2025	Entrepreneurship	Female Founders 500 Honoree	Inc	Won
2025	Disability Advocacy	Accessibility 100	Forbes	Won
2025	Achievements	Music Industry Pride List	Billboard	Won
2026	Audiobook	Earphones Award	Kirkus	Won
2026	Achievements	Accessibility 200	Forbes	Won

== Discography ==
=== Singles and Collaborations ===
Title	Artists	Date	Comments
Far	Markus Schulz and Lachi	October 2018 (U.S.)	We Are the Light Album
Go	Maduk (musician) and Lachi	February 2019 (Global)	Released by Liquicity
What I Want	Julian Javan and Lachi	February 2019 (U.S.)	Featured in feature film Married Young
Bigger Plans	INVIDA and Lachi	October 2020 (Global)	
Duality	Psyrus and Lachi	September 2021 (Global)	
Selfish	Lachi	October 2021 (U.S.)	Featured in Spotify's Created by Women
Say The Words	Alexander Turok, Bulin and Lachi	October 2020 (Global)	Released by Blanco Y Negro
Black Girl Cornrows	Lachi and Black Caviar featuring Yvie Oddly and QuestionATL	December 2022 (U.S.)	Celebrates Visual description
Lift Me Up	Lachi and James Ian ft Gaelynn Lea	July 2023 (Global)	In memorial of disability rights activist Judy Heumann
Out of the Dark	Lachi ft Medusa	Oct 2024 (Global)	Mad Different Series
Diseducation		Dec 2024 (Global)	Mad Different Series
That Kinda Black	Lachi ft Frank Nitty	Dec 2024 (Global)	Mad Different Series
Diseducation (Dance Mix)	special guest Apl.de.ap	Dec 2024 (Global)	Mad Different Series
Professional		May 2025 (Global)	Mad Different Series

=== Albums and EPs ===
Title	Date	Comments
It's Our Time	October 2014 (U.S.)	
The Boss EP	June 2015 (U.S.)	Singles: "Boss"
The Colors in my Mind by Chris Redding	August 2015 (U.S.)	Co-produced with Redding. Singles: "Love Cure"
Magnificent	July 2026 (U.S.)	Co-produced with Lucy Kalantari and Andrew & Polly. Singles: "Fidget" and "Moves"

== Filmography ==
Year	Film/Show	Role	Notes
2016	How To Act On Reality TV	Self	A short-doc directed by John Wilson
2022	Jeen-Yuhs: A Kanye Trilogy	Audio description narrator	A Netflix Documentary on Kanye West
2022	Keys to Success	Self	A short-doc featuring Alicia Keys
2023	Unlucky In Love	Wendy Lindell (lead), Casting Dir.	Award-winning short film
2023	Lift Me Up	Music Performer (lead), Producer	Music Video
2023	Guided Frame with Lachi	Self	Google Commercial
2024	Renegades American Masters	Host	A PBS digital series.

== Publications ==
=== Books ===
- M. Lachi, The Ivory Staff: A Dark Fairy Tale of Kings and War, Publisher: CreateSpace Independent Publishing Platform, 2019 ISBN 1544276605
- M. Lachi, Death Tengo, Publisher: Running Wild Press, 2023 ISBN 0692425640
- Lachi, I Identify as Blind; A Brazen Celebration of Disability Culture, Identity, and Power, Publisher: Tiny Reparations Books | Penguin Random House, 2025 ISBN 9780593851579

== See also ==
- Mononymous persons
