= RAMPD =

Music Industry Organization

Recording Artists and Music Professionals with Disabilities (RAMPD)
- Formation: 2021
- Purpose: Promoting inclusion
- Headquarters: New York, New York
- Founder: Lachi
- Website: Official site

Recording Artists and Music Professionals with Disabilities (RAMPD) is a platform that partners with music and entertainment entities, firms, and organizations on programming, opportunities, and resources to empower its global network of working music creators and professionals who identify as having a disability, neurodivergence, or other chronic conditions. RAMPD was founded in 2021. RAMPD is best known for its efforts working to make the Grammy Awards more accessible and inclusive of people with disabilities.

== History ==
RAMPD was founded in May 2021, by recording artist Lachi after a public talk between The Recording Academy and several disabled artists revealed there was a serious lack of visibility, access, and representation for professional disabled artists. Lachi was joined by violinist and songwriter Gaelynn Lea, and other established disabled music professionals, to officially launch RAMPD in January 2022.

RAMPD has since partnered or collaborated with prominent music and entertainment organizations, including Live Nation, American Association of Independent Music, The Recording Academy, Netflix, NIVA, and others to help train and bring disability awareness through panels, programs, and publications. RAMPD empowers its creators through songwriting mentorship programs, songwriting retreats, development opportunities, and upscale industry mixers geared towards integration, like RAMPD's DisCo House parties (Disability Community House).

== Mission ==
RAMPD's mission is to amplify disability culture, promote disability inclusion, and advocate for safe accommodating spaces in the music industry while working towards career authority and financial freedom for music professionals with disabilities. RAMPD defines disability culture as a celebration of the vast diversity of the disability experience and includes the worldviews, perspectives, contributions, art, words, and music of the disability community.

== Notable work ==
RAMPD has partnered with the Recording Academy to bring accessibility to the Grammy Awards ceremony since 2022.

== Awards and nominations ==
Year	Award	Category	Result
2022	Nightlife Culture Awards	Social Justice	Won
2022	Susan M Daniels Disability Mentoring Hall of Fame	Honoree	Won
2022	American Association of Independent Music's Libera Awards	Humanitarian Award	Nominated
2022	IBC Awards	Diversity and Inclusion Award	Shortlisted
2023	The Zero Project Award	Innovative Solution	Won
2023	International Academy of Digital Arts and Sciences Anthem Award	Diversity Equity and Inclusion Community Engagement Platform	Won
2023	Music Business Association Bizzy Award	Agent of Change	Won
2023	Synergies Work EDDIE Award	Creative Entrepreneurship	Won
2023	Harlem Festival of Culture	Black Independence Award	Nominated
2023	Black Ambition Prize	Black-owned Entrepreneurship	Shortlisted
2024	ADCOLOR	Innovator Award	Won
2025	Inc.	Female Founders 500	Won
2025	Billboard	Pride List	Won
