= 30th Massachusetts Infantry Regiment =

30th Massachusetts Volunteer Infantry
- Active: December 31, 1861 to December 1, 1865
- Country: United States
- Allegiance: Union
- Branch: Infantry
- Engagements: Battle of Baton Rouge; Battle of Port Hudson; Sabine Pass Campaign; Bayou Teche Campaign; Third Battle of Winchester; Battle of Fisher's Hill; Battle of Cedar Creek

The 30th Massachusetts was an infantry regiment that served in the Union Army during the American Civil War.

== Service ==
The 30th Massachusetts was initially organized at Camp Chase in Lowell, Massachusetts by Benjamin F. Butler as the "Eastern Bay State Regiment" on December 31, 1861. The regiment moved to Boston on January 2, 1862, where it mustered in for a three-year enlistment on January 4, 1862, under the command of Colonel Nathan Dudley.

The regiment was attached to 3rd Brigade, Department of the Gulf, to October 1862. Defenses of New Orleans to January 1863. 3rd Brigade, 1st Division, XIX Corps, Department of the Gulf, to August 1863. 1st Brigade, 1st Division, XIX Corps, Department of the Gulf, to July 1864, and Army of the Shenandoah, Middle Military Division, to March 1865. 1st Brigade, 1st Provisional Division, Army of the Shenandoah, to April 1865. Department of Washington to June 1865. Department of the South to December 1865.

The 30th Massachusetts mustered out of service on December 1, 1865.

== Detailed service ==
Sailed from Boston on steamer Constitution for Fort Monroe, Va., January 13, arriving January 16; then sailed for Ship Island, Miss., February 6, arriving there February 12, and duty there until April 15. (Company K joined the regiment March 9.) Operations against Forts St. Phillip and Jackson, Mississippi River, April 15–28, 1862. Occupation of Fort St. Phillip April 28. Moved to New Orleans April 29–30. Occupation of New Orleans May 1. Expedition to New Orleans & Jackson Railroad May 9–10. Moved to Baton Rouge May 30–31. Expedition from Baton Rouge June 7–9. Williams' Expedition to Vicksburg, Miss., and operations in that vicinity June 18-July 23. Ellis Cliff June 22. Hamilton Plantation, near Grand Gulf, June 24. Moved to Baton Rouge July 23–26, and duty there until August 21. Battle of Baton Rouge August 5. Moved to Carrollton August 21–22, and duty there until November 4. Garrison duty at New Orleans until January 13, 1863. Moved to Baton Rouge January 13–14. Expedition to Port Hudson March 7–27. Operations against Port Hudson May 12–24. Monett's Plantation and on Bayou Sara Road May 18–19. Plain's Store May 24. Siege of Port Hudson May 24-July 9. Assaults on Port Hudson May 27 and June 14. Surrender of Port Hudson July 9. Cox's Plantation, Donaldsonville, July 12–13. Camp at Baton Rouge August 1-September 2. Sabine Pass Expedition September 4–11. Moved from Algiers to Brashear City September 16, thence to Berwick and to Camp Bisland September 26. Bayou Teche Campaign October 3-November 30. At New Iberia, until January 7, 1864, and at Franklin until February 18. Veterans on leave February 18-May 3. Moved to New Orleans May 3–16, and to Morganza June 13. Moved to New Orleans, then to Fort Monroe, Va., and Washington, D.C., July 2–13. Snicker's Gap Expedition July 14–23. Sheridan's Shenandoah Valley Campaign August to December. Battle of Opequan, Winchester, September 19. Fisher's Hill September 22. Mt. Jackson September 23–24. Battle of Cedar Creek October 19. Duty at Winchester, Kernstown, and Stephenson's Depot until April 1, 1865. Moved to Washington, D.C., April 21–22, and duty there until June 1. Grand Review of the Armies May 23–24. Moved to Savannah, Ga., June 2–6, then to Georgetown, S.C., June 13, and to Florence June 27. To Sumter July 9. Duty in 3rd Sub-District Eastern South Carolina until December.

== Casualties ==
The regiment lost a total of 404 men during service; 4 officers and 57 enlisted men killed or mortally wounded, 2 officers and 341 enlisted men died of disease.

== Commanders ==
- Colonel Nathan Dudley
- Colonel Samuel D. Shipley

== Notable members ==
- Captain Eugene W. Ferris, Company D - Medal of Honor recipient for action at Berryville, Virginia, April 1, 1865

== See also ==
- List of Massachusetts Civil War Units
- Massachusetts in the American Civil War
