= Hugh Ferris =

Hugh Ferris or Ferriss may refer to:

- Hugh Ferriss (1889–1962), American architect, illustrator, and poet
- Hugh Ferris (rugby union) (1877–1929), South African rugby union player
- Hugh Ferris (presenter), English television, radio, podcast and events presenter
