= Joel E. Fichaud =

Canadian judge

Joel E. Fichaud is a former judge of the Nova Scotia Court of Appeal. He was appointed to the court October 2003 after the retirement of Edward J. Flynn. Prior to his appointment to the Court of Appeal he was a partner with Patterson Palmer in Halifax focusing on civil constitutional litigation.

He was called to the Nova Scotia bar in 1977.

In 1977, following the election of the separatist Parti Québécois government the previous year, the Canadian Bar Association set up a Committee on the Constitution. The Committee's mandate was to study and make recommendations on the Constitution of Canada. Fichaud was hired as the research assistant for the committee. The members of the Committee were drawn from each province of Canada, and included two future provincial premiers, a future Supreme Court of Canada justice, two future provincial chief justices, and a future Canadian Ambassador to the United Nations. The Committee presented its report to the CBA at the next annual meeting, in 1978.

He was considered a contender for the 2008 opening at the Supreme Court of Canada after the retirement of Michel Bastarache.

Joel Fichaud retired from the judiciary in August of 2026.
