= Thomas J. Walsh (Alberta lawyer) =

Canadian lawyer (1927–2010)

Thomas J. Walsh CM, AOE, QC, LL.D. (Hon.)

50th President of the Canadian Bar Association
- In office 1978–1979
- Preceded by: Jacques Viau
- Succeeded by: Gordon F. Henderson

President of the Alberta Branch, Canadian Bar Association
- In office 1970–1971
- Preceded by: J.W. Beames
- Succeeded by: J.M. Hope

Personal details
- Born: March 2, 1927 Winnipeg, Manitoba, Canada
- Died: June 30, 2016 (aged 89) Calgary, Alberta, Canada
- Spouse: Anne Millican
- Children: 5
- Education: University of Alberta (BA, LL.B)
- Profession: Lawyer

Thomas Joseph Walsh CM AOE QC (March 2, 1927 – June 30, 2016) was a Canadian lawyer, practising in Calgary, Alberta. In addition to a busy legal practice, he was very active in his community and profession, including serving a term as national president of the Canadian Bar Association. His community involvement was recognised by his appointment to the Order of Canada and to the Alberta Order of Excellence.

== Early life and education ==
Walsh was born in Winnipeg, Manitoba, the son of Thomas and Ann Walsh, with one sister, Martina. His father was a station agent with the Canadian Pacific Railway, which involved frequent moves for the Walsh family. Young Thomas grew up in Rosser, Sidney and Birtle, Manitoba, and Oxbow, Saskatchewan.

In 1946, Walsh entered the University of Alberta in an accelerated pre-law Bachelor of Arts program. He was active on campus, joining the Delta Epsilon fraternity and meeting his future wife, Anne. The couple eventually had five children. He then earned the degree of Bachelor of Laws from the Faculty of Law. He also served as a Flying Officer in the Royal Canadian Air Force with 418 Squadron, City of Edmonton Reserve from 1950 to 1952. While tempted by a career as a pilot, he chose to continue with his legal studies, graduating in 1953.

== Legal career ==
Walsh practised his entire career in Calgary, Alberta. He enjoyed real estate law, because of the personal satisfaction it gave him to help in a “win-win transaction for everyone involved.” In 1959, he founded his own law firm, now operating as Walsh LLP. In 2014, his firm recognised Walsh's 60 years of practising law.

== Leadership in the legal profession ==
Walsh played a leadership role in the legal profession. He participated in the governance of the legal profession as a Bencher of the Law Society of Alberta. He was the president of the Calgary Bar Association. In 1970-71, he served as the president of the Alberta branch of the Canadian Bar Association, followed in 1978-79 as the national president of the CBA.

== Community involvement ==
Throughout his career, Walsh was actively involved in his community and profession. He was a director, president or chairman of a number of community organisations, including the Downtown Calgary Rotary Club, the Calgary Family Service Bureau, the United Way, the Fort Calgary Preservation Society, the Calgary Tourist and Convention Bureau, the city’s Centennial Celebrations Committee, the Calgary Chamber of Commerce, the Calgary Economic Development Authority and the Calgary Winter Festival. He was involved with the Calgary Exhibition and Stampede.

Walsh also served on the Senate of the University of Alberta and as a member of the Faculty of Management Advisory Council at the University of Calgary. At the personal request of then-mayor of Calgary, Ralph Klein, Walsh led the establishment of the Calgary Parks Foundation. He was also a member of the original Calgary Airports Authority team, and eventually chair of the Authority. That in turn led to membership on the Canadian Airports Council and Airports Council International. He also served as a director of the Canadian Chamber of Commerce

== Death ==
Thomas Walsh died on June 30, 2016, at the age of 90, survived by his wife, five children and seven grandchildren.

== Honours and awards ==
- Order of Canada (1994)
- Alberta Order of Excellence (2008)
- Queen's Counsel (1967)
- Canada 125 Commemorative Medal (1992)
- Queen's Golden Jubilee Medal (2002)
- Queen's Diamond Jubilee Medal (2012)
- Doctor of Laws (Honorary), University of Alberta (1989)
- Certificate of Membership of 50 Years, Law Society of Alberta (2005)
- Bar of Paris, France (Honorary member)
- American Bar Association (Honorary Member)
- Law Society of Saskatchewan (Honorary Member)
- Law Society of Manitoba (Honorary member).
- Distinguished Service Award, Law Society of Alberta/Canadian Bar Association, Alberta Branch (1998)
- City of Calgary Centennial Award of Merit
- Calgary Stampede Life Member (2008)
- Paul Harris Fellowship, Rotary International
- David Gibson Award, Canadian Chamber of Commerce

== University of Alberta Distinguished Alumni Award Biography Video links ==
- Order of Canada Citation: Thomas Joseph Walsh, C.M., A.O.E.

Alb erta Order of Excellence Video
