= Eugene W. Ferris =

American Medal of Honor recipient

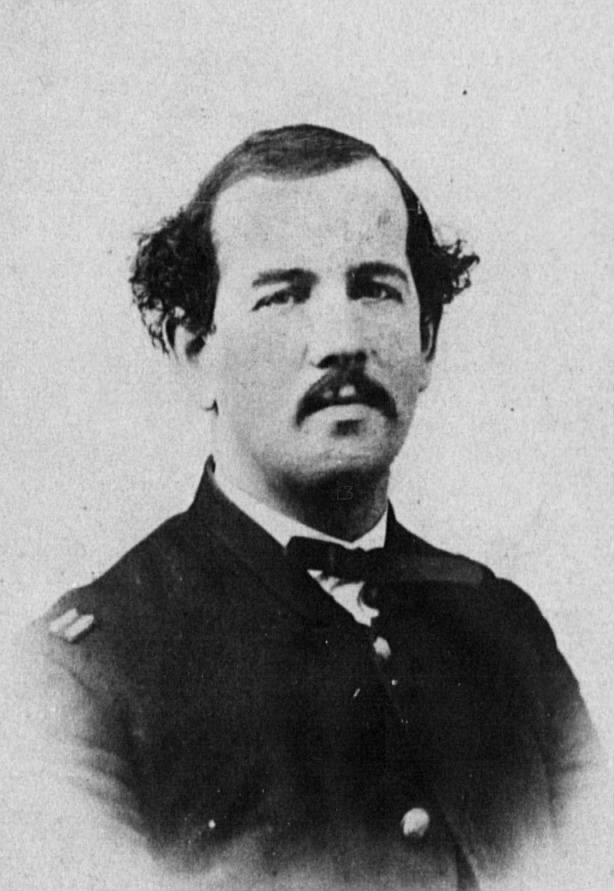
- Captain Eugene W. Ferris, c1865
- Born: November 18, 1842; Springfield, Vermont, US
- Died: February 26, 1907 (aged 64); Rockville, Indiana, US
- Burial place: Rockville Cemetery, Rockville, Indiana, US
- Military career
- Allegiance: United States
- Branch: United States Army; Union Army
- Service years: 1862 - 1865
- Rank: Captain and Adjutant
- Units: Company D, 30th Massachusetts Volunteer Infantry Regiment
- Conflicts: American Civil War
- Awards: Medal of Honor

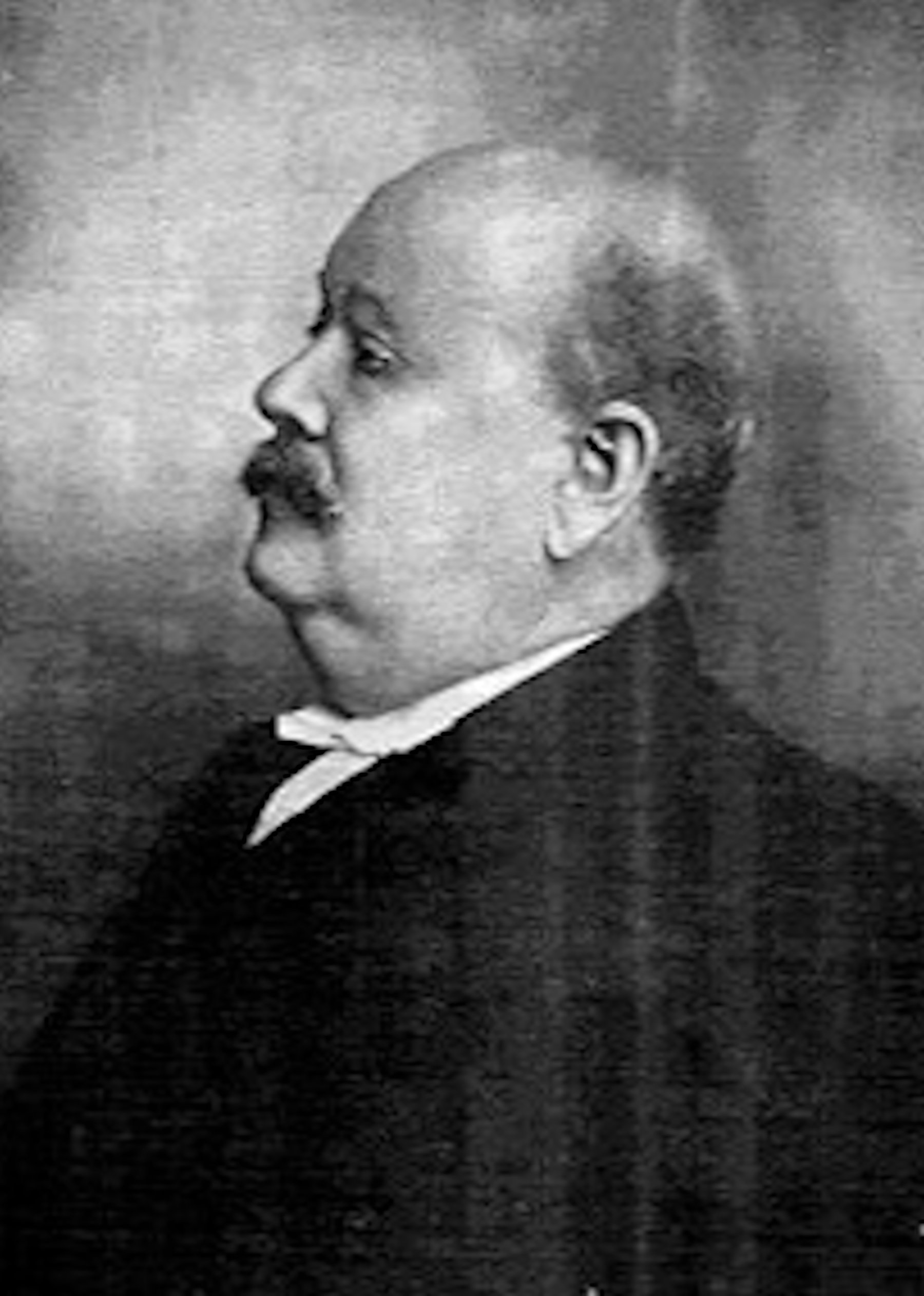
Medal of Honor winner Eugene W. Ferris c1897

Eugene W. Ferris (November 18, 1842 – February 26, 1907) was an American soldier who fought with the 30th Regiment Massachusetts Volunteer Infantry during the American Civil War. He received the United States' highest award for bravery during combat, the Medal of Honor, for resisting an attack by enemy cavalrymen near Berryville, Virginia on April 1, 1865. That award was conferred 32 years later on October 16, 1897.

== Formative years ==
Born in Springfield, Vermont on November 18, 1841, Eugene W. Ferris was the son of New York native Robert Ferris and Vermont native Fanny Ferris. According to historian Allan Tischler, Ferris was a child when he and his family relocated to Lowell, Massachusetts. By 1850, the Ferris household included parents Fanny and Robert (a stonemason), and their children, Helen, Fanny, Alexander and Eugene (aged 19, 18, 11, and 8, respectively). Also residing at the home were Ruth and Chester Rugg (a clerk), and Stillman Busher. After completing his education in Lowell, Eugene Ferris also went to work, having obtained a job as a bookkeeper.

== Civil War ==
Ferris was 20 years old when he joined the 30th Massachusetts Infantry on New Year's Day in 1862. After enrolling at Lowell, Massachusetts as a sergeant with that regiment's D Company, he was commissioned as an officer the following August, eventually rising up through the ranks to become a captain before war's end.

Fighting with his fellow 30th Massachusetts Volunteers "on the Mississippi River at Port Hudson, near Vicksburg, then in the Gulf Region of the Deep South, at New Orleans, Baton Rouge, and along the Red River" over the next two years, according to Tischler, Ferris was then transferred to Virginia with his regiment in mid-June 1864. During this time, while the 30th Massachusetts was attached to the U.S. Army's 19th Corps under Major-General Philip Sheridan, he was wounded in action when the 30th Massachusetts was engaged in battle as part of the Union Army's tide-turning 1864 Shenandoah Valley Campaign. Military engagements included the battles of Opequon (Third Winchester) and Fisher's Hill in September and the Battle of Cedar Creek on October 19.

Less than six months later, while serving as a regimental adjutant, Ferris performed the act of gallantry which became the catalyst for his Medal of Honor award. According to historian Robert W. Black, Ferris was already "combat experienced and had been wounded twice" when he and his orderly, Private James McLaughlin, were sent out by their superiors on April 1, 1865, to search for enemy guerillas in the area around Berryville, Virginia, and were set upon by members of Mosby's Rangers, a Confederate cavalry unit commanded by the "Gray Ghost", John Singleton Mosby. Facing off on the grounds of Colonel Daniel Bonham's farm near Sailor's Creek, Ferris refused a demand to surrender made by that enemy party's commanding officer (Charles Wiltshire) and shot that officer in the chest before he could draw his pistol. Dodging a bullet from a different Ranger's gun, he then shot that enemy cavalryman in the neck before wounding a third, stealing Wiltshire's horse, and riding away to safety. Ferris was then promoted to the rank of captain on April 21. A different account, penned in 1915 by Samuel Scoville, stated that Ferris and the Confederate officer "were armed only with sabres", and that Ferris gained the element of surprise when he "spurred his horse at the guerrilla-leader and suddenly executing a demi-volte which is only effective when performed by a good sabre and a trained horse ... whirled like lightning and caught his opponent such a tremendous back-handed slash that he cut him almost to the saddle." Ferris was then shot in the left thigh just above the knee while fighting off the other two enemy cavalrymen. Grabbing two pistols by unbuckling the officer's pistol belt, according to Scoville, he fired at the second enemy soldier with one hand while using his sabre against the third.

In June 1865, he was appointed Acting Aide de Camp for Brigadier-General George L. Beal, the commanding officer of the Headquarters, Military District of Eastern South Carolina, 3rd Separate Brigade, which was based in Georgetown County.

In August 1865, while serving with his regiment in South Carolina, he was appointed as Acting Assistant Inspector General for the District of Western South Carolina.

Ferris mustered out from military service in 1866.

== Post-war life ==
Following his honorable discharge from the military, Ferris worked in South Carolina for a time, where he was appointed as a state elections commissioner for Georgetown County in 1870 and, in 1873, as a tax collector for the U.S. Internal Revenue Service. Although Tischler has stated that Ferris relocated with his family sometime around 1900 to Rockville, Indiana, where he purchased and then operated the Parke Hotel, the 1900 federal census shows him as a single man operating a hotel on State Street in Albanytown, Delaware County, Indiana in June of that year. Also listed on this record were nine hotel staff and 20 boarders.

Newspaper accounts of his life help clarify that he moved to Indiana before the turn of the century. According to the October 6 and 7, 1897 editions of Washington, D.C.'s Evening Star and The Times of Philadelphia:

A medal of honor has also been presented to Eugene W. Ferris, of Albany, Ind., formerly first lieutenant and adjutant, 30th Massachusetts Volunteers, for distinguished gallantry near Berryville, Va., April 1, 1865.

He died on February 26, 1907, in Rockville, Indiana, and was subsequently buried with military honors at that community's Rockville Cemetery.

== Medal of Honor citation ==
The President of the United States of America, in the name of Congress, takes pleasure in presenting the Medal of Honor to First Lieutenant & Adjutant Eugene W. Ferris, United States Army, for extraordinary heroism on 1 April 1865, while serving with 30th Massachusetts Infantry, in action at Berryville, Virginia. Accompanied only by an orderly, outside the lines of the Army, First Lieutenant Ferris gallantly resisted an attack of five of Mosby's cavalry, mortally wounded the leader of the party, seized his horse and pistols, wounded three more, and, though wounded himself, escaped.

== See also ==
- List of American Civil War Medal of Honor recipients: A–F
