= Francis Ferris =

British High Court Judge (1932–2018)

Sir Francis Ferris TD

Justice of the High Court
- In office 1990–2003

Coat of arms of Francis Ferris
Motto My Deed Shall Match Thy Deed

Sir Francis Mursell Ferris, TD (19 August 1932 – 26 March 2018) was a British High Court Judge.

Francis Ferris was the son of Francis William Ferris and Elsie Lilian May Ferris (née Mursell). He educated at Bryanston School and Oriel College, Oxford. He was a High Court Judge (Chancery Division) from 1990 to 2003 and was a Queen's Counsel. He was appointed as an Honorary Fellow of Oriel College, Oxford, in 2000.

Ferris was an amateur rower and the only person to be successively Captain (1957), Chairman (1971–1986), and President (1992–2007) of the Marlow Rowing Club at Marlow, Buckinghamshire on the River Thames. He became a member of the Marlow Regatta's Committee in 1963, the Management Committee in 1999, and was elected as a Vice President in 2004.

Francis Ferris married Sheila Elizabeth Hester Falloon Bedford in 1957 and had four children. He was knighted in 1990.
