= Edythe Ferris =

American artist

- Born: 1897; Riverton, NJ
- Died: 1995 (aged 97–98); Philadelphia, PA

Edythe Ferris (1897–1995) was an American artist. Her work is included in the collections of the Smithsonian American Art Museum and the National Gallery of Art, Washington.
