= Paul Ferris =

Paul Ferris may refer to:

- Paul Ferris (composer) (1941–1995), English film composer
- Paul Ferris (footballer) (born 1965), Northern Irish former footballer, physiotherapist, barrister, CEO and award-winning author
- Paul Ferris (Scottish writer) (1963–2026), Scottish writer and criminal
- Paul Ferris (Welsh writer) (1929–2018), Welsh biographer and novelist
