= Christopher Ferris =

Computer scientist (born 1957)

- Born: c. 1957
- Employer: IBM
- Known for: Hyperledger open source code community co-leader
- Title: Chair Hyperledger Technical Steering Committee at Linux Foundation
- Movement: Open Source

Christopher (Chris) Ferris (born c. 1957) is a computer scientist, best known for co-leading the Hyperledger Fabric project where he chaired the Technical Steering Committee from 2016 to 2018 and was a member of the Governing Board of the foremost blockchain project of the Linux Foundation. Hyperledger has been one of the fastest-growing open community projects, with over 200 corporate and associate members. Ferris has a history of open-source software contributions to other technologies, including web services and cloud. Ferris is currently an IBM Fellow, and CTO Open Technologies.

== History ==
In 1999, Ferris was invited to work with OASIS (organization) on the problem of B2B transactions, launching his open-source career development. In the early days of the internet, vendor-specific and proprietary Electronic Data Interchange or EDI systems were proving “clunky” (slow to deploy and hard to maintain), and needed to be revised and opened up to encourage much faster adoption rates. As a Chief Architect of Sun Microsystems IT, he was invited to the first and second meetings of the OASIS (organization) working group looking into ebXML (Electronic Business Markup Language) for ERP (Enterprise Resource Management) and B2B (Business to Business) transactions, such as invoices, purchasing, payment transactions. The United Nations adopted this work as the foundational international standard around global commerce, see UN/CEFACT.

Ferris became vice chair of the OASIS working group on messaging. This work lead to SOAP replacing or underlying vendor-specific proprietary messaging systems, and led to the development of XML (eXtensible Markup Language) developed by a working group at the W3C (World Wide Web Consortium). Ferris then became chair of web service architecture working group at the W3C. In the fall of 2002, Ferris joined IBM, and later became an IBM Distinguished Engineer.

Ferris has also provided technical oversight and leadership in OpenStack, Cloud Foundry, Cloud Native Compute Foundation, Open Container Initiative, Mesos and Docker.,

== Linux Foundation Hyperledger ==
Ferris was a member of the Hyperledger Technical Steering Committee. He is an advocate for open source code communities with commercially-friendly licenses, and open governance, such as Linux Foundation Hyperledger.

Ferris was the keynote speaker on the "State of Blockchain", at the 2017 Open Source Leadership Summit for the Linux Foundation.

== Publications ==
- Androulaki E, Barger A, Bortnikov V, Cachin C, Christidis K, De Caro A, Enyeart D, Ferris C, Laventman G, Manevich Y, Muralidharan S. (2018), "Hyperledger Fabric: A Distributed Operating System for Permissioned Blockchains. arXiv preprint arXiv:1801.10228. 2018 Jan 30."
- Todd Moore and Chris Ferris (2016), "IBM's approach to open technology: Find out how we're investing in the communities and projects that matter most to the enterprise", “IBM developerWorks”, May 16, 2016
- Christopher Ferris, Kelvin Lawrence, Tony Storey (2007), “IBM Submission for the W3C Workshop on Web of Services for Enterprise Computing”
- Christopher Ferris, Joel A. Farrell (2003), What are Web services? Commun. ACM 46(6): 31
- Gupta A, Ferris C, Wilson Y, Venkatasubramanian K. Implementing Java computing: Sun on architecture and applications deployment. IEEE Internet Computing. 1998 Mar;2(2):60-4.

== Patents ==
Patents that are cited more than one hundred times:

- Gupta A, Ferris C, Abdelnur A, inventors; Sun Microsystems Inc, assignee. Method and apparatus for authenticating users. United States patent US 6,226,752. 2001 May 1.
- Wood DL, Weschler P, Norton D, Ferris C, Wilson Y, Soley WR, inventors; Sun Microsystems Inc, assignee. Log-on service providing credential level change without loss of session continuity. United States patent US 6,609,198. 2003 Aug 19.
- Wood DL, Norton D, Weschler P, Ferris C, Wilson Y, inventors; Sun Microsystems Inc, assignee. Single sign-on framework with trust-level mapping to authentication requirements. United States patent US 6,892,307. 2005 May 10.
- Wood DL, Weschler P, Norton D, Ferris C, Wilson Y, Soley WR, inventors; Sun Microsystems Inc, assignee. Log-on service providing credential level change without loss of session continuity. United States patent US 6,944,761. 2005 Sep 13.
- Abdelnur AH, Ferris C, inventors; Sun Microsystems Inc, assignee. User interface component. United States patent US 6,429,882. 2002 Aug 6.

== See also ==
- Hyperledger
