= Wesley Ferris =

Irish cricketer (1927–2001)

Cricket information
- Batting: Right-handed
- Bowling: Right-arm medium

International information
- National side: Ireland

Career statistics
Competition	First-class
Matches	2
Runs scored	10
Batting average	10.00
100s/50s	0/0
Top score	4*
Balls bowled	294
Wickets	4
Bowling average	36.00
5 wickets in innings	0
10 wickets in match	0
Best bowling	4/106
Catches/stumpings	0/–
- Source: CricketArchive, 15 November 2022

Stewart Wesley Ferris (2 May 1927 – 28 May 2001) usually known by his middle name as Weslet Ferris was an Irish cricketer.

A right-handed batsman and right-arm medium-pace bowler, he played three times for the Ireland cricket team in 1956. He made his debut in June against Scotland in a first-class match, taking four wickets in the Scotland first innings which were his only first-class wickets. In August, he played a drawn two-day game against Sussex, taking the only two wickets to fall in the Sussex first innings before the game finished. The following month he played his final match against the MCC, a first-class match in which he met without success as a bowler, not taking a wicket in the match, and scoring seven runs in total in the match without being dismissed.
