= Bâtonnier =

Head of the legal profession in some legal systems

In some legal systems, the bâtonnier is the head of the legal profession (the bar).

== Jersey ==
In Jersey, the Bâtonnier is head of the profession of advocate. The role includes administering the legal aid system for the island (the day-to-day administration is carried out by an Acting Bâtonnier, while the Bâtonnier decides appeals against the decision of the Acting Bâtonnier). The Bâtonnier formerly had a role in dealing with disciplinary matters involving advocates, but that role was removed in 2005.

== Quebec ==
The Bâtonnier is the leader of the Bar of Quebec and the de facto head of the profession of advocate. They are elected amongst and by their peers to monitor the Bar and represent the profession facing the public.

== France ==
In France, the role is primus inter pares (first among equals).

=== Election and function ===
Elected by the members of the bar for a term of two years, the Bâtonnier is the spokesman for lawyers registered in his bar.

But in addition, it has a real function of arbitration between lawyers and a function as mediator when a dispute arises between a lawyer and his client. He is also the one who appoints lawyers for the court. The successor of the Bâtonnier is elected before the end of the term of the latter. For one year, the designated Bâtonnier can increase his competence on various issues that he will have to address upon his entry into service.

=== Etymological origin ===
The location of the Sainte-Chapelle on the île de la Cité in Paris was in the 10th century a chapel dedicated to Saint Nicholas, who is one of the patron saints of lawyers. It was famously the site for the annual reopening of the parlement of Paris. The members gathered there to form the brotherhood of Saint-Nicolas, which was both a corporation and a religious order. The elected Chief of this brotherhood, at first called the prior, carried the banner of the order suspended from a pole or baston, during processions.

This banner was sometimes decorated with a representation of St. Nicholas or St. Yves (another patron saint of lawyers). An order of 23 October 1274 recognized lawyers as members of a constituent body in Parliament, bound by professional secrecy.

In 1690, the Dictionnaire universel des sciences et des arts stated that the bastonnier (or the bastonniere) is "he or she who carries for a while the baston of a brotherhood, and who carries it or follows it in processions. In terms of the Palace of Justice, it is a former lawyer chosen annually according to the order of the Tableau, to be the head of the community of lawyers and prosecutors, to be the master of their Chapel and their brotherhood, and preside over the tribunal that they hold for maintaining the discipline of the Palace and its regulations. He also manages the commission of inquiry of lower judges during their ban. "
