= John Ferris =

John Ferris may refer to:

- J. J. Ferris (John James Ferris, 1867–1900), Australian cricketer
- John Ferris (New Brunswick politician) (1811–1884), Canadian federal politician, represented Queen's, New Brunswick
- John Ferris (Ontario politician) (born 1930s), Canadian provincial politician, represented London South, Ontario
- John Ferris (swimmer) (1949–2020), American swimmer
