= Gerald R. Ferris =

- Education: University of Illinois at Urbana–Champaign (Ph.D.)
- Occupations: Professor, author
- Known for: Management and psychology

Gerald R. Ferris is the Francis Eppes Professor of Management and professor of psychology at Florida State University. He has published extensive research in the areas of social influence in organizations, performance evaluation, relationships at work and reputation in organizational contexts. Ferris served as editor of the annual series Research in Personnel and Human Resources Management from 1981–2003, and has authored or edited a number of books including: Political Skill at Work: Impact on Work Effectiveness, Handbook of Human Resource Management, Strategy and Human Resources Management, and Method & Analysis in Organizational Research.

In 2001, Ferris was the recipient of the Heneman Career Achievement Award and in 2010, he received the Thomas A. Mahoney Mentoring Award, both from the Human Resources Division of the Academy of Management. He was formerly a professor of labor and industrial relations, of business administration, and of psychology at the University of Illinois Urbana–Champaign, where he directed the Center for Human Resource Management at the University of Illinois from 1991 to 1996. In 1982 he received a PhD in business administration from the University of Illinois Urbana–Champaign.
