= Hank Ferris =

American football coach

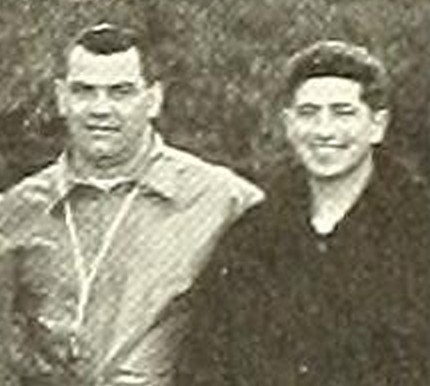
- Hank Ferris (left) with Jerry Edwards

Biographical details
- Born: c. 1920s

Coaching career (HC unless noted)
- 1966–1968: Montclair State

Head coaching record
- Overall: 9–17

Henry M. "Hank" Ferris is an American former football coach. He served as the head football coach at the Montclair State University in Upper Montclair, New Jersey from 1966 to 1968, compiling a record of 9–17.

Ferris played college football as a fullback for the Michigan State Spartans. He later graduated from Syracuse University. He coached high school football at Sauquoit Valley and Ilion Central before joining Montclair State in 1960. He was an assistant football coach from 1960 to 1963 and head wrestling coach from 1964 to 1965 before being named head football coach.

== Head coaching record ==
Year	Team	Overall	Conference	Standing	Bowl/playoffs
Montclair State Indians (NCAA College Division independent) (1966–1968)
1966	Montclair State	3–5			
1967	Montclair State	4–5			
1968	Montclair State	2–7			
Montclair State:		9–17			
Total:		9–17			
