= Samuel Scoville =

American writer, naturalist, and lawyer

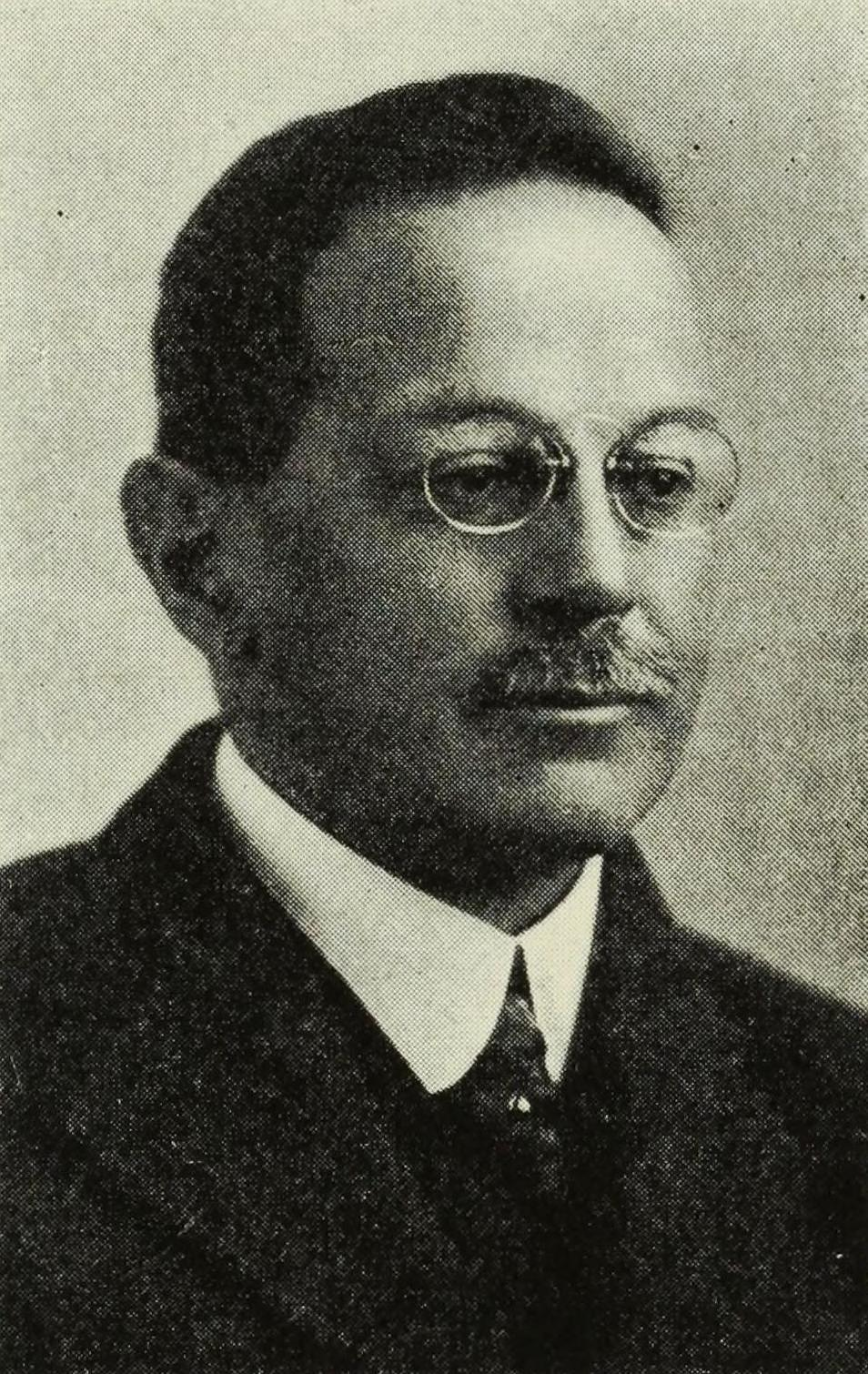
Scoville circa 1918

Samuel Scoville Jr. (June 9, 1872 – December 4, 1950) was an American writer, naturalist, and lawyer.

== Early life and education ==
Samuel Scoville Jr. was born on June 9, 1872, in Norwich, New York, the son of Harriet Eliza (Beecher) (1838–1912) and Samuel Scoville Sr. (1834–1902). He attended Stamford High School. He received an AB from Yale College (1893) and an LLB from the University of the State of New York (1895). On October 17, 1889, he married Katharine Gallaudet Trumbull in Philadelphia.

== Career ==
=== Law ===
Scoville was a member of the New York City law firm of Beecher & Scoville. As of 1908, he was a sole practitioner in Philadelphia.

=== Writing ===
Scoville wrote a column called "First Aid Law" in the Philadelphia Bulletin under the name "A Philadelphia Lawyer". He wrote many books about nature for young readers, some of which were republished in 2019 by the South Jersey Culture and History Center. Man and Beast (Harcourt Brace, 1926) is a work of fiction for children about animals of the jungle. Wild Honey (Little, Brown, 1929) is a book of essays for adults about the natural world of the East Coast of North America.

As a naturalist, Scoville published a few articles about ornithology in The Auk (now Ornithology) and The Yale Review. From 1916, he was an associate member of the American Ornithologists' Union (now the American Ornithological Society).

== Publications ==
=== Books ===
- Brave Deeds of Union Soldiers (1915)
- Abraham Lincoln: His Story (1918)
- Boy Scouts in the Wilderness (1919)
- The Out-of-Doors Club (1919)
- Everyday Adventures (1920)
- Wild Folk (1922)
- More Wild Folk (1924)
- Man and Beast (1926)
- Runaway Days (1927)
- Lords of the Wild (1928)
- Wild Honey (1929)
- Alice in Blunderland (1934)

=== Articles ===
- Scoville, Samuel (1914). "The Evolution of Our Criminal Procedure". Annals of the American Academy of Political and Social Science. 52: 93–101. doi:10.1177/000271621405200111. ISSN 0002-7162. JSTOR 1012486. S2CID 143070459.
- Scoville, Samuel (October 1934). "The Nesting of the Canada Warbler in Connecticut". The Auk. 51 (4): 526. doi:10.2307/4077843. JSTOR 4077843.

== Personal life ==
As of April 1897, Scoville lived with his father in Stamford, Connecticut. On April 23, he was shot by a burglar at his home, but survived.

Scoville was a Republican and a Congregationalist. He died on December 4, 1950, at his home in Haverford, Pennsylvania, shortly after admission to Bryn Mawr Hospital.
