= Visual description =

Written or verbal description of visual elements

Visual description, also referred to as image description or self description (or in the case of film or television program audio description) is a detailed explanation of visual which provides textual or verbal access to visual content or scenery. When referring to webpages, social media content, or online documents, visual description is often conveyed in the form of Alt attribute, and in the case of self-introduction for inclusive meetings, it is often the verbal or written description of one's physical characteristics, identity and surroundings.

== Image description ==
An image description is a form of text-based description referring to the characteristics of an image. Alt text presents visual information via text (usually encoded in HTML code), primarily to aid blind people using screen readers so they may have access and interact with the visual.

== Self description ==
To provide visual access for people who are blind or with other disabilities, a self-description is the short explanation of an individual's physical appearance and identity characteristics declared at the start of group meetings, seminars, panel discussions, or general introductory protocol. It usually consists of one's name, gender and ethnic identity, visible qualities and more.
