= Hugh Ferris (rugby union) =

South African rugby union player (b. 1877, d. 1929)

- Born: Hamish Hood Ferriss; 6 December 1877 Newry, County Down, Ireland
- Died: 17 July 1929 (aged 51)
- School: Methodist College, Belfast

Rugby union career
- Position: Half-Back
Provincial / State sides
Years	Team	Apps	(Points)
- Transvaal
International career
Years	Team	Apps	(Points)
1903	South Africa	1	(0)
- Correct as of 3 June 2019

Hugh Ferris (6 December 1877 – 17 July 1929) was a South African international rugby union player who played as a half-back.

He made 1 appearance for South Africa in 1903.
