= James Ferris (disambiguation) =

James Ferris or Ferriss may refer to:

- James Ferris (1932–2016), American chemist
- James Marshall Ferris (1828–1893), Canadian politician
- James Ferriss (1849–1926), American politician and amateur conchologist
