= Susan McGrath =

Canadian scholar

Academic background
- Education: B.A., McMaster University; MES, 1990, York University; PhD, 1999, University of Toronto
- Thesis: The politics of truth: a case study of knowledge construction by the Social Planning Council of Metropolitan Toronto, 1957-1988 (1999)

Academic work
- Institutions: York University

Susan Lee McGrath OC is a Professor Emerita in the School of Social Work at York University and former director of York's Centre for Refugee Studies.

== Career ==
After earning her PhD at the University of Toronto, McGrath joined the faculty in the School of Social Work at York University. As an associate professor at York, McGrath sat on the Board of Directors for the Canadian Centre for Victims of Torture during their 2000–01 fiscal year. The next year, she chaired the Canadian Centre for Victims of Torture Public Education Committee.

From 2004 until 2012, McGrath served as Director of York's Centre for Refugee Studies. Under this title, she also served as president of the International Association for the Study of Forced Migration and chaired the Board of the Canadian Centre for Victims of Torture. Her work was recognized by the Social Sciences and Humanities Research Council with the 2015 Impact Award for Partnership. Later, McGrath was also appointed a Member of the Order of Canada for her contributions to research and policy on refugee rights. York University recognized McGrath as a research leader at their annual York U Research Leaders celebration.

During the 2017–18 academic year, McGrath was the recipient of a $25,000 SSHRC Grant for her project "Connecting Emerging Scholars and Practitioners to Foster Critical Reflections and Innovation on Migration Research." In September 2019, McGrath published her co-edited book "Mobilizing global knowledge: refugee research in an age of displacement" through the University of Calgary Press.

== Selected publications ==
- Mobilizing global knowledge: refugee research in an age of displacement (2019)
