= Bernard Amyot =

Canadian lawyer

Bernard Amyot is a Montreal lawyer. He has served as the President of the Canadian Bar Association, appointed in 2007. He is also known for his involvement as the attorney for Omar Khadr in his Federal terrorism trial in Canada. He is currently the Chairman of the Board of Directors for the National Theatre School of Canada. He is a graduate of the McGill University Faculty of Law, where he served as the Associate Editor for the McGill Law Journal.
