= A. Boyd Ferris =

Canadian lawyer

A. Boyd Ferris QC

48th President of the Canadian Bar Association
- In office 1976–1977
- Preceded by: Irwin Dorfman
- Succeeded by: Jacques Viau

Personal details
- Born: July 23, 1929 Winnipeg, Manitoba, Canada
- Died: July 31, 1989 (aged 60) Whistler, British Columbia, Canada
- Party: Liberal Party of Canada
- Spouse(s): Sylvia Mackadenski, Kerry-Lynne Findlay
- Children: 5
- Education: University of British Columbia Faculty of Law
- Profession: Lawyer

A. Boyd Ferris QC (July 23, 1929 – July 31, 1989) was a Canadian lawyer practising in Vancouver, British Columbia. He served as president of the British Columbia branch of the Canadian Bar Association, and then as the national president of the CBA. He was also active in politics, being a major supporter of Pierre Trudeau in his campaign for the leadership of the Liberal Party of Canada, and in the 1968 general election.

== Early life ==
Ferris was born at Winnipeg, Manitoba, the son of Arthur Ferris and Margaret Boyd Hannah. He graduated from Daniel McIntyre Senior High School in 1948. He was active in several sports, including boxing, track and football. He played for the Winnipeg Western Wildcats, the Manitoba Bisons of the University of Manitoba, and one year as a professional with the Winnipeg Blue Bombers in the Canadian Football League.

== Legal career ==
Ferris articled with the Vancouver firm of Guild, Yule and was called to the Bar in 1955. He then went into private practice in Vancouver with the firm of Davis and Co. He practised there for 24 years, and then in 1979 transferred to Boughton, Peterson, Yang, Anderson, staying there until his death.

Ferris specialised in civil litigation, developing a reputation as one of the leading counsel in British Columbia. He was interested in labour and banking matters, but also appeared in a variety of civil proceedings and administrative law matters. He appeared regularly in civil jury trials, and towards the end of his career focussed on insurance law from the defence perspective. He appeared in all levels of courts, including the Supreme Court of Canada, as well as administrative tribunals. He had a reputation of quickly mastering his brief prepared by his juniors, and as an expert in cross-examination. Although he enjoyed the courtroom, he recognised that it was often better for his clients to settle a case.

In recognition of his excellence as counsel, he was appointed Queen's Counsel in 1969.

== Leadership in the Canadian Bar Association ==
Ferris was a long-time member of the Canadian Bar Association. He was elected a member of the national Council of the CBA in 1968 and president of the British Columbia Branch of the CBA in 1971–72. He was elected to the national Executive in 1973, and national Treasurer in 1974. He served as national President of the CBA in 1976–77.

Ferris was president during a time of great political turmoil in Canada. In the fall of 1976, the voters of Quebec elected the separatist Parti québecois government in the 1976 provincial election in Quebec. At the annual meeting of the CBA in August, 1977, Ferris in his presidential address called for the CBA to respond to events in Quebec by passing a resolution in favour of national unity and a strong federal government, and rejecting separatism. The resolution was introduced by Paul Fraser, the president of the British Columbia Branch of the CBA, and seconded by Robert Lesage, the president of the Quebec branch. The resolution generated considerable controversy, as some members did not think the CBA should be taking a position on political issues, while many Quebec members thought that the resolution attempted to impose a particular view on the sovereignty issue as a condition of membership. After considerable negotiations, the resolution was amended on a motion by Yves Fortier, a past-president of the Quebec Branch, and Bryan Williams, the incoming president of the British Columbia Branch. The amendment removed some of the language explicitly supporting the federal system and rejecting separatism. Instead, the result of the resolution was that the CBA created a committee to study and make recommendations on the constitution. The committee was chaired by the incoming president of the CBA, Jacques Viau, and was made up of many well-regarded lawyers from across Canada.

== Political activity ==
Ferris was also active in politics. He was a supporter of the Liberal Party both federally and provincially, and chaired and co-chaired a number of election campaigns. His most significant campaigns were for Pierre Trudeau. In 1967–68, Ferris chaired Trudeau's successful campaign committee for leadership of the Liberal Party of Canada. The next year, he was co-chair of the Liberal campaign committee in the general election of 1968, which resulted in the election of Trudeau as Prime Minister of Canada with a healthy majority in the House of Commons.

== Community activities ==
Ferris was also active in his community. He served as a director of the British Columbia Lions in the CFL, the Van Dusen Botanical Gardens, the Greater Vancouver Boys and Girls Club, the British Columbia Research Council, Tourism Vancouver, the Canadian Council of Christians and Jews, and the Rotary Club of Vancouver. He was also a Mason and a Shriner.

== Family and death ==
Ferris died suddenly of a heart attack in 1989. At the time of his death he was married to Kerry-Lynne Findlay, who also went on to be president of the British Columbia branch of the CBA. The couple had two children. He also had three children from a previous marriage.

The University of British Columbia Law School has offered the Boyd Ferris Memorial Prize in Advocacy.
