= Jim Ferris =

Jim Ferris is a professor for the Disabilities Studies Program at the University of Toledo in Toledo, Ohio. He is also the author of several books and journals on poetry and disability.

== Biography ==
Jim Ferris was born with what he describes as a "mobility impairment." His actual disability was that one leg grew shorter than the other. He was born in Cook County, Illinois, not far from Chicago where he later attended a school for crippled children. Ferris is cited as saying that he was a “defective child” who found himself in a “system intent on ‘fixing’ him.” This included surgery and rehabilitation meant to correct his disability.

Ferris has written several books, essays, and poems, including “Hospital Poems” and “The Enjambed Body.” Some of his work has received awards, including fellowship awards from the Wisconsin Arts Board.

He has taught at the University of Wisconsin-Madison and is currently the chair of the Disabilities Studies Program at the University of Toledo in Ohio. Ferris has said, “Poetry is an important part of what I do and how I think about experiences and respond to the world.”

== Hospital Poems ==
Winner of the 2004 MSR Poetry Book Award Hospital Poems was a collection of poems published as a memoir to recall his childhood spent in the hospital. Many of these poems go deep inside Ferris's own journey. Ferris' poems range from humorous, to agitation, and optimism. His most well known poem, "Poet of Cripples", has gained critical acclaim for speaking out against the "fix-it" establishment.

== Work ==
- Hospital Poems Published Main Street Rag (October 30, 2004).
- Aesthetic Distance & the Fiction of Disability pp. 56–68 IN: Sandahl, Carrie (ed. and introd.); Auslander, Philip (ed. and introd.); Phelan, Peggy (afterword); Bodies in Commotion: Disability and Performance. Ann Arbor, MI; U of Michigan P; 2005. (viii, 339 pp.)
- The Enjambed Body: A Step Toward a Crippled Poetics Georgia Review, Summer2004, Vol. 58 Issue 2, p219-233, 15p;
