= Stockbroker =

Professional who buys and sells shares for others

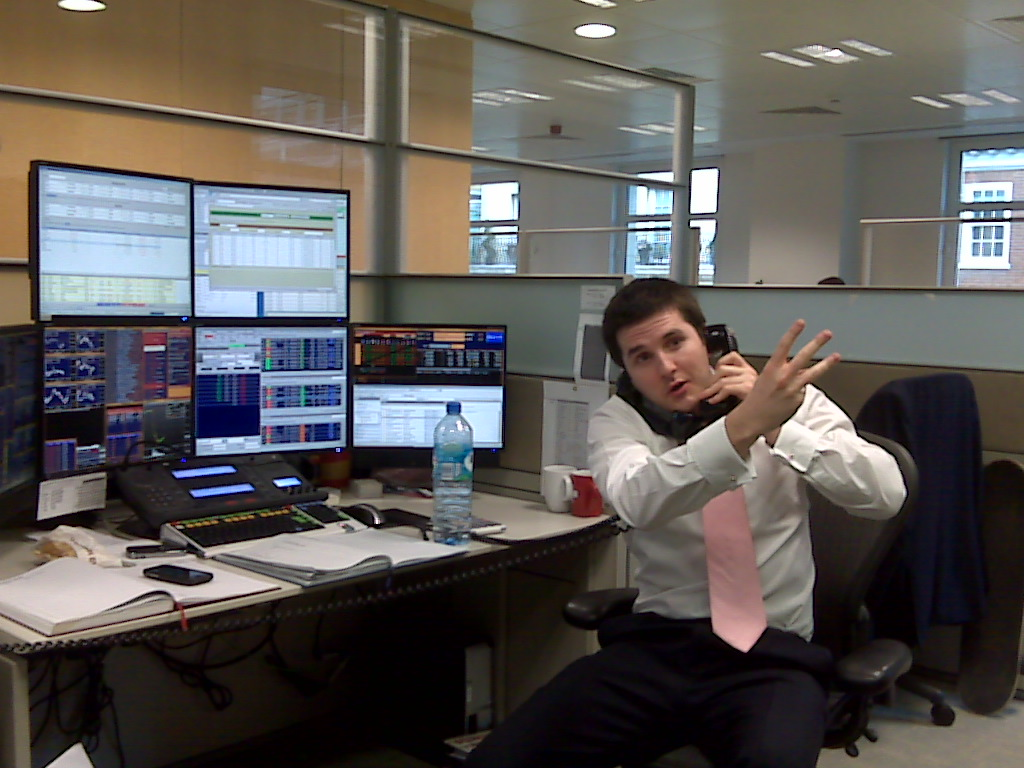
- A stock trader with a multi-monitor workstation, including a Bloomberg Terminal

Occupation
- Names: Stockbroker; Investment adviser Share broker Registered representative Trading representative Investment broker Investment adviser Financial adviser Wealth manager Investment professional
- Occupation type: Profession
- Activity sectors: Finance

A stockbroker is an individual or company that buys and sells stocks and other investments for a financial market participant in return for a commission, markup, or fee. In most countries they are regulated as a broker or broker-dealer and may need to hold a relevant license and may be a member of a stock exchange. They generally act as a financial adviser and investment manager. In this case they may also be licensed as a financial adviser such as a registered investment adviser (in the United States).

Examples of professional designations held by individuals in this field, which affects the types of investments they are permitted to sell and the services they provide include chartered financial consultants, certified financial planners or chartered financial analysts (in the United States and UK), chartered financial planners (in the UK).

In the United States, the Financial Industry Regulatory Authority provides an online tool designed to help understand professional designations.

== History of stock broking ==
(...) This enigmatic business [i.e. the inner workings of the stock exchange in Amsterdam, primarily the practice of VOC and WIC stock trading] which is at once the fairest and most deceitful in Europe, the noblest and the most infamous in the world, the finest and the most vulgar on earth. It is a quintessence of academic learning and a paragon of fraudulence; it is a touchstone for the intelligent and a tombstone for the audacious, a treasury of usefulness and a source of disaster, (...) The best and most agreeable aspect of the new business is that one can become rich without risk. Indeed, without endangering your capital, and with out having anything to do with correspondence, advances of money, warehouses, postage, cashiers, suspensions of payment, and other unforeseen incidents, you have the prospect of gaining wealth if, in the case of bad luck in your transactions, you will only change your name. Just as the Hebrews, when they are seriously ill, change their names in order to obtain relief, so a changing of his name is sufficient for the speculator who finds himself in difficulties, to free himself from all impending dangers and tormenting disquietude.

— Joseph de la Vega, in his book Confusión de confusiones (1688), the earliest book about stock trading

The first recorded buying and selling of shares occurred in Rome in the 2nd century BC. After the fall of the Western Roman Empire, stockbroking did not become a profession until after the Renaissance, when government bonds were traded in Italian city-states such as Genoa and Venice. In 1602, the Amsterdam Stock Exchange (now Euronext Amsterdam) became the first official stock market with trading in shares of the Dutch East India Company, the first company to issue stock. In 1698, the London Stock Exchange opened at the Jonathan's Coffee-House. On May 17, 1792, the New York Stock Exchange opened under a platanus occidentalis (buttonwood tree) in New York City, as 24 stockbrokers signed the Buttonwood Agreement, agreeing to trade five securities under that buttonwood tree.

== Types of stock brokers ==
Most stock brokers fall into one of three categories:

- Full-service brokers are traditional brokers that offer portfolio management, research, investment advice, and risk management services. They provide comprehensive guidance, by leveraging their expertise as financial analysts and investment managers. These brokers have access to research reports, market information, and investment recommendations. In exchange for these services, full-service brokers typically charge higher fees, often calculated as a fixed percentage of assets under management (AUM).
- Discount brokers are platforms that offer cost-efficient trading in stocks and exchange-traded funds (ETFs). They typically provide few or no additional services, charge lower commissions and fees, and offer accessible trading platforms and training. A key distinction is that investors retain greater control over individual investment decisions.
- Online brokers are technology-driven firms that provide online access to trading markets and related services. This category is broad and includes both full-service and discount brokers, offering varying levels of services and features. They typically charge lower fees and commissions and operate regulated online trading platforms.

== Functions ==
Traditional brick-and-mortar and modern brokers share key functions and responsibilities:

1. Order execution: brokers buy (call) and sell (put) securities for clients as their primary responsibility. A broker has access to markets and can execute trade orders accordingly.
2. Portfolio management: brokers determine how the assets under management are traded, subject to their agreements with clients. Portfolio management involves various aspects, such as careful planning, execution, and risk management for optimal results.
3. Market research and analysis: brokers are also tasked with researching markets, analyzing technical and fundamental data, and finding profitable trading setups and investment opportunities.
4. Investment advice and recommendations: clients can also hire brokers to provide an assessment of investment opportunities based on their analyses and recommend stocks with good prospects for investment.

Brokers typically combine all of these functions but may provide just one based on the client. For instance, brokers may act as financial advisors, giving investment advice to clients but not executing trades for them.

== Licensing and training requirements ==
The path to stock brokerage usually involves formal training, certifications, and licenses. Most stockbrokers begin as career financial advisors or broker representatives and then go on to get their brokerage license after completing training on financial markets, products, regulations, and often sales, and passing exams (Series 7 and Series 63).

=== Australia ===
Up until January 1, 2019, investment professionals that offer financial advice in Australia had to pass training pursuant to RG146. They must hold an Australian Financial Services Licence that is overseen by the Australian Securities and Investments Commission. They are subject to fiduciary obligations.

As of 2019, Australia's biggest online stockbroker was Commonwealth Securities, other large brokers were ANZ Share Investing, nabtrade and Westpac Online Investing.

=== Canada ===
In Canada, to be licensed as a "registered representative" or an "investment advisor" and thus be qualified to offer investment advice and trade all instruments with the exception of derivatives, an individual employed by an investment firm must have completed the Canadian Securities Course, the Conduct & Practices Handbook, and the 90-day Investment Advisor Training Program. Within 30 months of obtaining designation as a "registered representative", the registrant is further required to meet the post-licensing proficiency requirement to complete the Wealth Management Essentials course. A registered representative is also required to complete 30 hours of professional development (product knowledge) and 12 hours of compliance training every three year continuing education cycle as set out by the Investment Industry Regulatory Organization of Canada. To trade options and/or futures, a registered representative must pass the Derivatives Fundamentals Course in addition to the Options Licensing Course and/or the Futures Licensing Course, or alternatively, the Derivatives Fundamentals Options Licensing Course for options.

=== Hong Kong ===
In Hong Kong, to become a representative one has to work for a licensed firm and pass 3 exams to prove competency. Passing a fourth exam results in obtaining a "specialist" license. All tests can be taken with the Hong Kong Securities Institute. After passing all tests, approval must be received by the Securities and Futures Commission.

=== India ===
Share brokers in India are governed by the Securities and Exchange Board of India Act, 1992 and brokers must register with the Securities and Exchange Board of India (SEBI). The National Stock Exchange of India and the Bombay Stock Exchange via brokers, provide an ecosystem to investors to trade in capital markets through various channels - broker offices, investment advisor or screen-based electronic trading system. An individual employed by an investment firm must complete the National Institute of Securities Markets (NISM) exam and apply to SEBI for registration as an Investment Advisor.

Stock market advisory and research services are highly regulated in India. Only SEBI registered stock advisory and investment research analysts are allowed to do so. The complete details of these authorized persons are available on website of SEBI for protection of investors.

=== Ireland ===
The recognized benchmark designation for investment professionals in Ireland is the QFA ("qualified financial adviser") designation, which is awarded to those who pass the Professional Diploma in Financial Advice and agree to comply with the ongoing "continuous professional development" (CPD) requirements. The qualification, and attaching CPD program, meets the "minimum competency requirements" specified by the Financial Regulator, for advising on and selling five categories of retail financial products:

- Stock shares, bonds, and other investment instruments
- Savings, investments, and pensions
- Mortgage loans
- Consumer credit
- Life insurance

As of 2019, Davy and Goodbody were Ireland's largest stockbrokers.

=== New Zealand ===
In New Zealand, the New Zealand Qualifications Authority oversees qualifications. The New Zealand Certificate in Financial Services (Level 5) is the minimum level of qualification necessary to offer investment advice.

=== Singapore ===
In Singapore, becoming a trading representative requires passing 4 exams, modules 1A, 5, 6 and 6A, from the Institute of Banking and Finance and applying for the license through MAS and SGX.

=== South Africa ===
The Johannesburg Securities Exchange rules require that member firms must be under the control of a "qualified stockbroker", who is also an executive director of the firm; and branches, likewise managed. The South African Institute of Stockbrokers (SAIS) offers the six exams required to become such, a Certified Stockbroker, or CSb(SA), following 3 years' work experience, and with other educational requirements met.

SAIS also offers the Financial Markets Practitioner vocational certification as well as various "Regulatory Recognition" examinations. See also re. "Regulated Positions" and "Registered Persons" at South African Institute of Financial Markets.

=== South Korea ===
In South Korea, the Korea Financial Investment Association oversees the licensing of investment professionals.

=== United Kingdom ===
Stockbroking is a regulated profession in the United Kingdom and brokers must achieve a recognised qualification from the Appropriate Qualifications list of the Financial Conduct Authority (FCA).

The Chartered Institute for Securities & Investment (CISI), established in 1992, is the largest UK professional body for investment professionals. It evolved from the London Stock Exchange, has around 45,000 members in over 100 countries and delivers more than 40,000 exams each year.

CFA UK also offers various FCA Appropriate Qualifications. It represents the interests of around 12,000 investment professionals and is part of the worldwide network of members of the CFA Institute.

=== United States ===
The Financial Industry Regulatory Authority, a self-regulatory organization, regulates investment professionals in the United States. Exams that individuals may take for accreditation include the Series 7 exam, the Uniform Securities Agent State Law Exam (Series 63), the Uniform Combined State Law Exam (Series 66), and the Uniform Investment Adviser Law Exam (Series 65).

Individuals holding some of those licenses, such as the Series 6 exam, cannot be called stockbrokers since they are prohibited from selling stocks. Selling variable products, such as a variable annuity contract or variable universal life insurance policy, typically requires the broker to also have one or another state insurance department licenses.

Individuals and firms are regulated by the U.S. Securities and Exchange Commission and laws related to the Investment Advisers Act of 1940, including laws related to fiduciary.

== Notable stock brokers ==
- Charles Robert Schwab Sr.
- Jordan Belfort
- Killian Clarke
- Eugene Davy
- Tomas Fischer
- Freddy Heineken
- Rita Humphries-Lewin
- James R. Keene
- André Kostolany
- Jesse Livermore
- Harshad Mehta
- Karl Meyer (businessman)
- Slađana Milošević
- Jo Nesbø
- Edward H. Ntalami
- Flemming Østergaard
- Ketan Parekh
- Erik Penser
- Mats Qviberg
- Léopold Renouard
- Elisabeth Rivers-Bulkeley
- Shane Ross
- Geoffrey Rothschild
- Patricia Szarvas
- Henry Tucker (Bermudian politician, born 1903)
- Paul Tudor Jones

== See also ==
- Boiler room (business)
- Floor broker
- Mutual fund
- Prime brokerage
- Securities market
- Stock market data systems
- Stock trader
- Stock valuation
