= Investment Banking Exam =

Examination administered by the U.S. government

The Limited Representative – Investment Banking Exam, commonly referred to as the Series 79, is an examination administered by the U.S. Financial Industry Regulatory Authority (FINRA) for investment banking professionals. The examination is designed to qualify candidates for a limited scope of activities as investment bankers, without the full requirements of the General Securities Representative Exam (Series 7).

== See also ==
- List of Securities Examinations
- Series 6
- General Securities Representative Exam (Series 7)
- Series 63
- Series 65
- Financial Industry Regulatory Authority (FINRA)
- Uniform Securities Act
