= Ross Stripling =

American baseball player (born 1989)

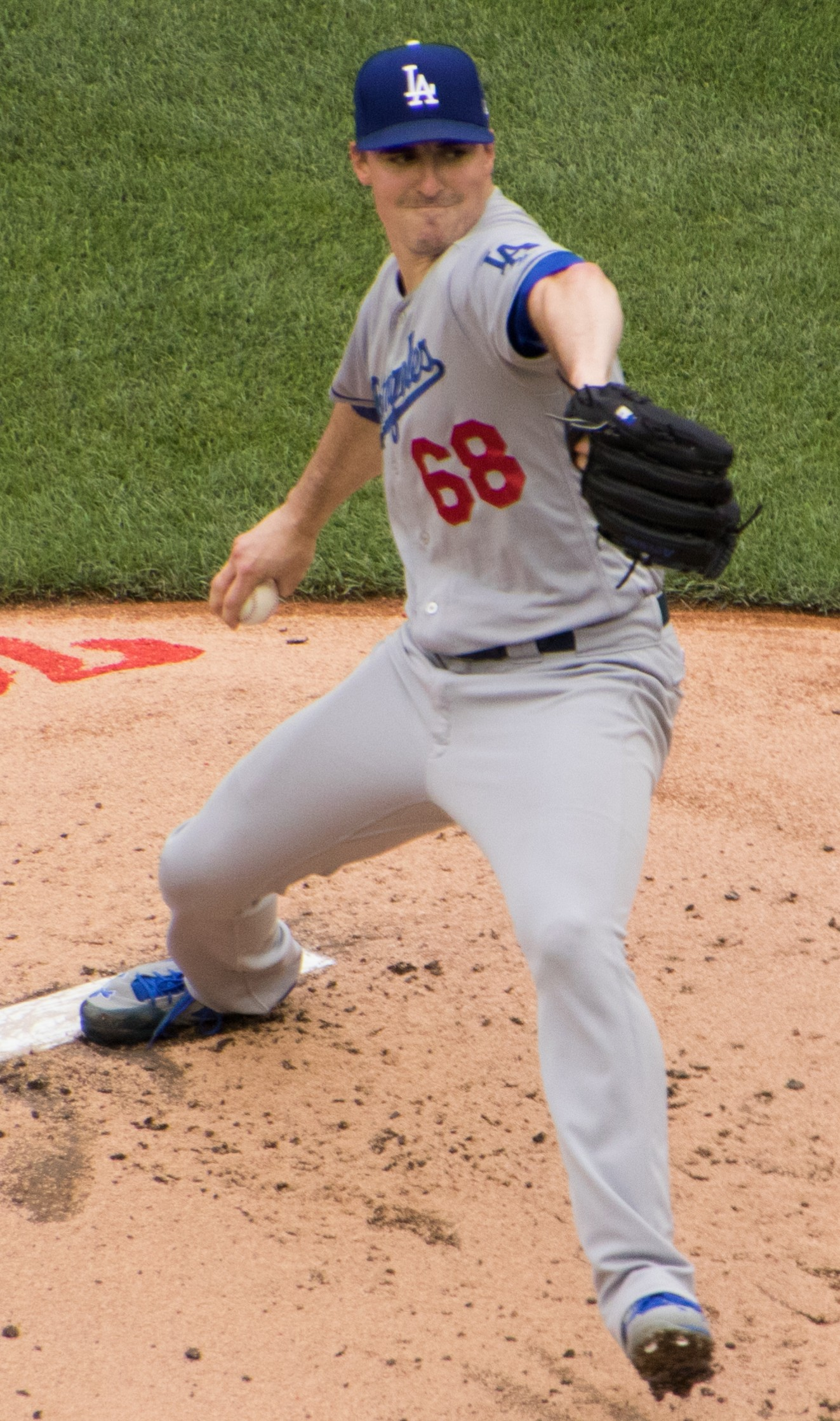
- Stripling with the Los Angeles Dodgers in 2018
- Pitcher
- Born: November 23, 1989 (age 36); Blue Bell, Pennsylvania, U.S.
- Batted: Right Threw: Right

MLB debut
- April 8, 2016, for the Los Angeles Dodgers

Last MLB appearance
- September 28, 2024, for the Oakland Athletics

MLB statistics
- Win–loss record: 40–54
- Earned run average: 4.17
- Strikeouts: 741
- Stats at Baseball Reference

Teams
- Los Angeles Dodgers (2016–2020); Toronto Blue Jays (2020–2022); San Francisco Giants (2023); Oakland Athletics (2024)

Career highlights and awards
- All-Star (2018)

Thomas Ross Stripling (born November 23, 1989) is an American former professional baseball pitcher. He played in Major League Baseball (MLB) for the Los Angeles Dodgers, Toronto Blue Jays, San Francisco Giants, and Oakland Athletics.

Stripling played college baseball at Texas A&M University before the Dodgers selected him in the fifth round of the 2012 MLB draft. He made his MLB debut with the Dodgers in 2016, and was an All-Star in 2018.

== Amateur career ==
Stripling played high school baseball at Carroll High School in Southlake, Texas. In baseball, he did not pitch until a broken leg prior to his senior season in 2008 left him unable to play in the infield, and as a pitcher he was 14–0 with a 1.60 ERA, as in 107 innings he led the Dallas/Fort Worth area with 156 strikeouts. He was named first-team all-state, and a member of the North Texas all-star team. He also played basketball for the school as a forward, and football as a wide receiver, winning the Texas 5A state title and the national championship. Scholastically, he graduated summa cum laude and 11th in his class of 600+.

Stripling enrolled at Texas A&M University and played college baseball for the Texas A&M Aggies. In 2011, he led the country in wins and was 14–2 with a 2.29 ERA in 24 games (16 starts) in which he threw 125.2 innings with 113 strikeouts (third in the Big 12 Conference), with an 0.867 WHIP (fourth), 6.5 hits/9 innings (ninth), 1.3 walks/9 innings (second), and 6.28 strikeouts/walk (third). He threw a no-hitter for the Aggies against San Diego State on May 12, 2012. He was named an All-American by the American Baseball Coaches Association/Rawlings First Team, Collegiate Baseball (Third Team), and College Baseball Insider (Honorable Mention), as well as a third team Capital One Academic All-American and first team Academic All-Big 12.

Stripling was drafted by the Colorado Rockies in the ninth round of the 2011 Major League Baseball draft, but he did not sign. Returning to Texas A&M for his senior year in 2012, he finished the year second in the conference in wins with a 10–4 record and a 3.08 ERA in 16 starts covering 125.2 innings in which he struck out 120 batters (third in the Big 12 Conference), with an 0.987 ERA (eighth), 1.4 walks/9 innings (fourth), and a 6.32 strikeout/walk ratio (second).

== Professional career ==
=== Los Angeles Dodgers ===
The Los Angeles Dodgers selected Stripling in the fifth round of the 2012 Major League Baseball draft, and he signed for a signing bonus of $130,000. He was promoted to Double-A Chattanooga Lookouts in May 2013 and was selected to the mid-season Southern League All-Star Game. He finished the season 6–4 with a 2.78 ERA in 21 games (16 starts).

Stripling was given a non roster invitation to spring training in 2014, but came down with a sore arm after his first game action. He turned out to have a torn ulnar collateral ligament in his elbow. He underwent Tommy John surgery, causing him to miss the entire season. He rejoined the Double–A Tulsa Drillers during mid-season in 2015 and finished 3–6 with a 3.88 ERA in 14 starts. On November 20, 2015, the Dodgers added Stripling to their 40-man roster to protect him from the Rule 5 draft.

Stripling made the Dodgers' Opening Day roster for 2016 as the fifth starter. After several injuries to established pitchers, he beat out other Dodgers prospects to make the roster.

In his major league debut, against the San Francisco Giants on April 8, 2016, Stripling pitched 7 1/3 innings without giving up a hit but was removed for a relief pitcher after throwing 100 pitches. He struck out four and walked four, one of whom scored against the relief pitcher. He picked up his first major league win against the St. Louis Cardinals on May 13, 2016. Stripling appeared in 22 games and made 14 starts for the Dodgers with a 5–9 record and 3.96 ERA in 100 innings. He also appeared in relief in five post-season games for the Dodgers, allowing five runs in 2 2/3 innings.

Stripling became a key member of the bullpen in 2017 and picked up his first save on May 27, 2017, with three scoreless innings of relief against the Chicago Cubs. He appeared in 49 games for the Dodgers that season, including two starts, and was 3–5 with two saves and a 3.75 ERA in 74 1/3 innings in which he struck out 74 batters. Stripling pitched three scoreless innings over five games in the postseason, including appearances in three games of the 2017 World Series.

Coming into the 2018 season and without a clear pathway to becoming a starting pitcher he, again, began to explore the idea of starting for another team but injuries to starting pitchers in April thrust him into a starting role after 15 innings of relief. After a bullpen session with pitching coach Rick Honeycutt, he developed a hard curveball to add to his arsenal giving him a new look and making him one of the National League's ERA leaders at the break, earning him an All-Star nod for the first time in his career, replacing Miles Mikolas on the team, who was scheduled to pitch the Sunday prior to the All-Star Game. Stripling wound up pitching in 33 games for the Dodgers in 2018, including 21 starts, and was 8–6 with a 3.02 ERA in 122 innings with 22 walks (1.6 walks per 9 innings) and 136 strikeouts, and a strikeout/walk ratio of 6.18. His walk rate was in the lowest 4% among major league pitchers.

In 2019, he again alternated between starting and relieving, appearing in 32 games (15 starts), and was 4–4 with a 3.47 ERA and 93 strikeouts in 90 2/3 innings. He had a ratio of 4.65 strikeouts/walk.

Stripling agreed with the Dodgers on a one-year, $2.1 million, contract for 2020, avoiding arbitration. In early 2020, Stripling and Joc Pederson were nearly traded to the Los Angeles Angels in exchange for Luis Rengifo, but the trade fell through. In seven starts for the Dodgers in the pandemic-abbreviated season of 2020, Stripling was 3–1 with a 5.61 ERA in 33 2/3 innings.

=== Toronto Blue Jays ===
On August 31, 2020, Stripling was traded to the Toronto Blue Jays in exchange for Kendall Williams and another player to be named later (Ryan Noda). With the 2020 Toronto Blue Jays, Stripling appeared in five games, compiling an 0–2 record with a 6.32 ERA and 13 strikeouts in 15 2/3 innings pitched. Between the two teams, he was 3–3 with a 5.84 ERA in 12 games (9 starts) in which he threw 49 1/3 innings and struck out 40 batters. His former team, the Dodgers won the World Series that season, and gave Stripling a World Series ring the following August.

In 2021, he recorded a 5–7 record with a 4.80 ERA and 94 strikeouts along with 30 walks in 101 1/3 innings in 24 games (19 starts).

On August 17, 2022, Stripling had a perfect game going against the Baltimore Orioles, before it was broken up on his first pitch of the seventh inning. This was the second time in four days that a perfect game was pitched against the Orioles through six or more innings.

In 2022, he was 10–4 with a 3.01 ERA in 32 games (24 starts) covering a career-high 134 1/3 innings, in which he gave up 20 walks (1.3 walks/9 innings) and struck out 111 batters. He had a WHIP of 1.020, and a strikeout/walk ratio of 5.55. His walk rate was in the lowest 2% among major league pitchers.

=== San Francisco Giants ===
On December 13, 2022, Stripling signed a two-year $25 million contract with the San Francisco Giants, with an opt-out after the 2023 season. He went on the injured list in August with a 5.29 ERA over 19 games pitched, 11 of them starts. Stripling finished the season with an 0-5 record and a 5.36 ERA and did not opt out of the $12.5 million salary for the 2024 season.

=== Oakland Athletics ===
On February 2, 2024, the Giants traded Stripling and cash considerations to the Oakland Athletics in exchange for Jonah Cox. On August 14, after struggling to a 2–11 record and 5.72 ERA in 14 starts for Oakland, Stripling was moved to the bullpen. In 22 total appearances for Oakland, he compiled a 2-11 record and 6.01 ERA with 49 strikeouts across 85 1/3 innings pitched.

=== Kansas City Royals ===
On February 19, 2025, Stripling signed a minor league contract with the Kansas City Royals. He requested and was granted his release by the Royals on March 23, after failing to make the Opening Day roster.

On May 5, 2025, Stripling announced his retirement from professional baseball via multiple social media posts.

== Personal life ==
Stripling married his longtime girlfriend, Shelby Gassiott, on November 11, 2017. They live in Houston during the offseason.

Stripling earned a bachelor's degree in finance from Texas A&M, and is a FINRA-licensed stockbroker and investment advisor. He passed the Series 7 exam in 2016 and the Series 66 exam in 2017. On January 31, 2019, Stripling appeared on Fox Business Network and contributed commentary regarding the markets before fielding questions regarding his major league debut and baseball analytics. He trades stocks regularly, even during the baseball season.
