= Chartered Financial Planner =

Qualification for professional financial planners

Chartered Financial Planner is a British qualification for professional financial planners and financial advisers awarded by the Chartered Insurance Institute.

== Description ==
By definition, holders of the Chartered Financial Planner qualification are among the most experienced and most qualified advisers in the profession; in the United Kingdom, it is a widely accepted "gold standard" within the profession.

As at May 2016, there were over 36,000 members of the Personal Finance Society (the principal professional body for financial advisers in the UK), of which over 5,000 hold Chartered Financial Planner status.

Since 2012, financial adviser firms can apply for Corporate Chartered Financial Planners status, if they qualify under a number of criteria. Fewer than 500 firms can boast Corporate Chartered Financial Planners status.

The titles of Chartered Financial Planner and Chartered Financial Planners were granted by the Chartered Insurance Institute (CII). The Privy Council authorised the CII to issue the Chartered title in 2005. Thus, a Chartered Financial Planner now carries comparable qualifications as other established professions such as Chartered Accountants and Chartered Surveyors, etc. Membership of the Personal Finance Society, the leading professional body for financial planners, is required to be able to use the professional designation Chartered Financial Planner.

The individual Chartered Financial Planner qualification fits into the National Qualifications Framework at Level 6, equivalent to a Bachelor (first) Degree.

== Requirements ==
To attain Chartered Financial Planner status as an individual, one must study for and pass approximately 14 exams in various aspects of financial services and related subjects. Each exam offered by the Chartered Insurance Institute carries a certain number of "credits" in their qualification scheme. Credits can also be granted for passing equivalent exams from other awarding bodies. A total of 290 credits is required before Chartered status can be applied for. This is likely to take several years to achieve.

In addition to examinations, advisers are required to be members of the Personal Finance Society, maintain ongoing learning through a required amount of Continuing Professional Development (CPD) each year, and have a minimum of five years of relevant industry experience.

== Corporate chartered status ==
Firms that can demonstrate the highest commitment to professional standards, development and ethics can apply for Corporate Chartered Financial Planners status. At the end of January 2017, there were fewer than 500 firms authorised to use the title.

== Related designations UK ==
There are over 208 designations available for financial-services professionals.

These are some of the more common designations:

- Certified Financial Planner

In the United Kingdom, the CFP designation is available to financial planners through membership of the Chartered Institute for Securities & Investment (CISI).

- Chartered Tax Adviser
- Chartered Certified Accountant and/or Chartered Accountant
- Chartered Financial Analyst

== Equivalent titles in the US ==
In the United States, the Certified Financial Planner (CFP) qualification is more broadly comparable to the CFA's Chartered status.

The MFP Master Financial Planner designation from the American Academy of Financial Management is also the graduate designation for financial planners. The MFP is a federal trademarked designation in the United States which requires accredited exams and degrees.

Other titles in the US include:

- Certified Investment Management Analyst (CIMA), Investment Management Consultants Association
- Chartered Market Technician
- Financial Risk Manager (Global Association of Risk Professionals)

== See also ==
- Certified Public Accountant
- Chartered Financial Consultant
- Chartered Tax Adviser (Australia)
- Chartered Tax Adviser (UK)
