= Registered representative (securities) =

Stockbroker

A registered representative, also called a general securities representative, a stockbroker, or an account executive, is an individual who is licensed to sell securities and has the legal power of an agent in the United States.

Registered representatives usually work for broker/dealers licensed by the U.S. Securities and Exchange Commission (SEC) and the Self Regulatory Organizations (SRO) of the New York Stock Exchange (NYSE) and Financial Industry Regulatory Authority (FINRA).

To become a registered representative in the United States, one must be sponsored by a broker/dealer firm and must pass the FINRA-administered Series 7 examination (known as the General Securities Representative Exam) or another Limited Representative Qualifications Exam. Some state laws and broker/dealer policies also require the Series 63 examination (known as the Uniform Securities Agent State Law Exam).

A registered representative ("RR" or "rep" or "broker") is authorized to sell a large array of securities such as stocks, bonds, options, mutual funds, limited partnership programs and variable annuities. Registered representatives who sell variable products such as variable annuities or variable universal life insurance policies typically also must obtain the appropriate state insurance department license(s).

== See also ==
- List of securities examinations
- Stock selection criterion
- Proper authority, in Australia
