= Registered investment adviser =

American firm registration with the SEC

In the United States, a registered investment adviser (RIA) is a firm or individual who provides investment advice to clients about securities for compensation and is registered with either the United States Securities and Exchange Commission (SEC) or the appropriate state securities authority, depending on the size and scope of their business.

Registered investment adviser firms receive compensation in the form of fees for providing financial advice and investment management. They are required to act as a fiduciary.

== Difference with broker-dealer ==
Registered investment adviser's role is very different from the role of broker-dealers and their representatives, who provide recommendations for a commission. Broker-dealers and their representatives are not required to act as a fiduciary, they simply must make suitable recommendations for a client. This is a different standard of care, but most consumers are unaware of the difference, as any of these professionals may call themselves a financial advisor. In some instances, a firm may be "dual registered", meaning they are a registered investment adviser along with being registered as a broker-dealer. In that case, they may provide advice for a fee and collect a commission on certain product sales.

== Standard ==
=== Fiduciary standard ===
An IA must adhere to a fiduciary standard of care laid out in the US Investment Advisers Act of 1940. This standard requires IAs to act and serve a client's best interests with the intent to eliminate, or at least to expose, all potential conflicts of interest which might incline an investment adviser—consciously or unconsciously—to render advice which was not in the best interest of the IA's clients.

To "promote compliance with fiduciary standards by advisers and their personnel", on August 31, 2004, the SEC adopted Rule 204A-1 under the Investment Advisers Act of 1940 requiring investment advisers to adopt a code of ethics setting forth "standards of conduct expected of advisory personnel and to address conflicts that arise from personal trading by advisory personnel. Among other things, the rule requires advisers' supervised persons to report their personal securities transactions."

Rule 204A-1 treats all securities as reportable securities, with five exceptions (i.e., direct obligations of the US Government, certain money market instruments, certain money market funds, certain mutual funds, and certain unit investment trusts). The rule is "designed to exclude securities that appear to present little opportunity for the type of improper trading that the access person reports are designed to uncover". However, transactions in exchange-traded funds are reportable securities according to an SEC response to National Compliance Services, Inc.'s 2005 request for no action guidance.

While "The rule does not require the adviser to adopt a particular standard, the standard chosen must reflect the adviser's fiduciary obligations and those of its supervised persons, and must require compliance with the federal securities laws." Although the rule contains certain minimum provisions, advisers have "substantial flexibility to design individualized codes that would best fit the structure, size and nature of their advisory businesses". Most state regulators require or recommend advisers establish similar ethical requirements and supervisory procedures.

==== Investment Adviser Fiduciary Standard vs. Broker-Dealer Suitability ====
The financial industry and lawmakers have yet to establish a consistent standard for providing investment recommendations to retail investors.

Section 202(a)(11)(C) of the Investment Advisers Act of 1940 exempts from the definition of an Investment Adviser (and therefore the associated fiduciary standard) "any broker or dealer whose performance of such services is solely incidental to the conduct of his business as a broker or dealer and who receives no special compensation therefor".

In Release 34–51523; the Financial Industry Regulatory Authority (FINRA), the US Securities Self Regulatory Organization (SRO) having authority over Brokers and Dealers, determined that Broker-Dealers (BD) are "not to be deemed investment advisors" and therefore are not subject to the same fiduciary standards as IAs when recommending investments to clients, as are Registered Investment Advisers.

Registered Representatives (RRs) affiliated with a Broker Dealer are therefore required to recommend securities that are deemed "suitable" for non-institutional clients. The FINRA "Suitability" standard requires that a member shall make reasonable efforts to obtain information concerning a client's:

1. Financial status
2. Tax status
3. Investment objectives
4. Risk tolerance
5. Other information used or considered to be reasonable

RRs of a Broker-Dealer who also engages in the business of providing investment advice are required to affiliate with a Registered Investment Adviser. As Investment Adviser Representatives (IARs) they are held to the "Fiduciary Standard" as defined under the US Investment Advisers Act of 1940 when providing investment advice to clients. This requires the dually registered Financial Advisors recommending a security to clearly communicate to their clients whether they are brokering suitable security as a RR or providing investment advice as an IAR and therefore acting as a fiduciary. Some "dually registered" advisors are limited in the scope of their recommendations by their affiliation with their broker-dealers and therefore do not have unfettered access to all product/service solutions for their clients. This is known as a "Captive Platform" which many dually registered or "Hybrid" advisors are affiliated with. Only "Independent RIAs" (those not affiliated with (or restricted by) a broker dealer) can be considered true fiduciaries.

In 2012, suitability and "know your customer" (KYC) rules will expand with FINRA rule 2111. This rule will effectively expand liability for recommendations of strategy. Over the years, investment advisors have been taught to know the customer's suitability, objectives, time horizon and risk tolerance, and to limit speculative or aggressive recommendations based on information from the customer. With the new rule 2111, brokers may be liable for their product and service recommendations which are part of a strategy. A strategy could include tax, retirement, investments, funds, or even estate planning. Therefore, a registered adviser may want to make better use of CPA advice or licensed attorneys. "New FINRA Rule 2111 generally is modeled after former NASD Rule 2310 (Suitability) and requires that a firm or associated person "have a reasonable basis to believe that a recommended transaction or investment strategy involving a security or securities is suitable for the customer, based on the information obtained through the reasonable diligence of the member or associated person to ascertain the customer's investment profile".

Following are some of the more substantive changes under FINRA's new "know your customer" (KYC) rules :

- Firms' and brokers' efforts to get to know their customers are now expressly governed by a reasonableness standard.
- Firms' and brokers' KYC obligations are now limited to knowing (i) their customers, and (ii) the authority of each person acting on behalf of their customers.
- The new KYC rule expressly directs that firms and brokers should use reasonable diligence to know those facts required to (i) effectively service their customers' accounts, (ii) act in accordance with any special handling instructions for their customers' accounts, (iii) understand the authority of each person acting on behalf of their customers, and (iv) comply with applicable laws, regulations, and rules.
- Firms and brokers should use reasonable diligence to retain their customers' KYC information and keep it up to date.
- The new suitability rule expressly identifies the following information to be used in determining suitability: (i) customer's age, (ii) other investments, (iii) financial situation and needs, (iv) tax status, (v) investment objectives, (vi) investment experience, (vii) investment time horizon, (viii) liquidity needs, (ix) risk tolerance, and (x) any other information the customer may disclose.
- Suitability now expressly applies to "investment strategies" as well as investments, and it also expressly applies to recommendations to "hold" as well as recommendations to buy, sell, and exchange.
- The new suitability rule directs firms and brokers to have a reasonable basis for believing an investment or strategy is suitable based on the information they obtain through reasonable diligence (as opposed to based on what their customers tell them).

==== Uniform Fiduciary Standard ====
Section 913 of the Dodd-Frank Act mandated that the SEC study whether a uniform fiduciary standard should be applied to brokers and investment advisers. The results of the SEC's study released in January 2011 recommended that the SEC proceed with rulemaking to adopt a uniform fiduciary standard for brokers and investment advisers when providing personalized investment advice to retail consumers.

On March 1, 2013, the SEC issued Release No. 34-69013 to request information for a cost-benefit analysis to determine the anticipated economic impacts of moving forward with uniform fiduciary standard rulemaking.

== Registration ==
=== State registered investment advisers ===
In general, RIAs managing assets totaling less than $100 million must register with the state securities agency in the state where they have their principal place of business.

=== Federally registered investment advisers ===
In general, RIAs that manage $100 million or more in client assets must register with the U.S. Securities and Exchange Commission (SEC). While the process is not as involved as registration as a broker-dealer, it can be complex.

As of 2019, 12,993 firms were federally-registered serving over 43 million clients; most firms were small, with 88% having fewer than 50 employees. FINRA-registered stockbrokers, who may also provide advice but are not fiduciaries, dropped to 3,596 firms and 4,720 individuals, some of whom are "wirehouse brokers".

=== Registering requirements ===
Representatives of the RIA who are charged with providing investment advice are called an "investment adviser representative" (IAR). These IARs must generally complete the Uniform Investment Adviser Law Examination (see List of securities examinations) known as the Series 65 Exam, or by meeting the exam waiver requirement by holding one or more of the following pre-qualifying designations; Certified Financial Planner (CFP), Chartered Financial Consultant (ChFC); Personal Financial Specialist (PFS), Chartered Financial Analyst (CFA), or Chartered Investment Counselor (CIC). However, these requirements differ by states. For example, New York has no exam requirements for representatives of SEC-registered RIA firms.

== Fees and regulations ==
RIAs are permitted to make risky investments, which can result in significant losses. Fees are typically as a percent of assets under management (AUM), and around 1%. This may include "held-away" assets such as investment properties for high-net-worth individuals.

Unlike mutual funds, RIAs may not report their overall performance, since they represent a varied number of clients and investment objectives. However, when they do report data such as performance, such advertising is required to be factual and not misleading.

Some asset managers charge a fixed fee, but about 95% charge as a percent of AUM.

== See also ==
- Financial adviser
- List of securities examinations
