= Hedgeable =

U.S. based financial services company

- Company type: Private
- Industry: Personal finance, Investment Management, Digital Wealth Management, Automated Investing, Portfolio Management, Investment services
- Founded: 2009
- Founder: Michael Kane, Matthew Kane
- Defunct: 2021
- Headquarters: New York City, United States
- Key people: Michael Kane (Co-Founder, CEO), Matthew Kane (Co-Founder, COO), Siddharth Sharma, CFA, FRM (CTO)
- Website: www.hedgeable.com

Hedgeable, Inc. was a U.S. based financial services company and digital wealth management platform headquartered in New York City. Hedgeable was known for not following set allocations, and instead actively managing accounts in response to market movements.

On August 9, 2018, Hedgeable closed its doors to new investors, with existing investors required to transfer out of the company. The company claimed that it was not shutting down but simply removing its SEC registration.

== History ==
Hedgeable was founded in 2009 by twin brothers Michael and Matthew Kane, who previously worked at high-net worth investment managers such as Bridgewater Associates and Spruce Private Investors. Both Michael and Matthew graduated from Penn State University with degrees in finance. Hedgeable is a Registered Investment Advisor with the U.S. Securities and Exchange Commission. The company has received funding from SixThirty and Route 66 Ventures as well as various other angel investors. On August 9, 2018, Hedgeable closed its doors to new investors.

== Investing Strategies ==
Hedgeable did not follow a buy-and-hold approach, but instead actively manages accounts in response to market movements focusing on downside protection in bear markets. Their strategy was different from other robo-advisors, which use Modern Portfolio Theory.

Hedgeable offered investment options including Exchange Traded Funds (ETFs) to individual stocks, master limited partnerships, private equity and bitcoin. Mutual funds were not used in portfolios.

Although the firm's focus was to provide a direct-to-consumer service, Hedgeable's investment strategies were available to financial advisors and institutions as well through a variety of platforms.

== Product Features ==
When it was open to external clients, Hedgeable aimed to gamify their personal finance experience. Clients could open a new account or transfer an existing account. Hedgeable accepted retirement accounts, taxable accounts, business accounts and various other account types. Hedgeable offered the following features:

- Downside protection
- Account aggregation
- Alternative investments
- Alpha rewards
- API
- Mobile app

It was awarded 4/5 for client transparency by Paladin Research. Hedgeable was the winner of the Finovate Fall 2015 Best of Show Award and the GREAT 2015 Tech Award (FinTech Category).

In 2016, Hedgeable launched its first iOS mobile app in order to expand their product offerings.
