= Joseph Borg =

Joseph Borg may refer to

- Joseph Borg (regulator) (born 1951), American financial regulator
- Joe Borg (born 1952), Maltese politician
- Joe Borg (screenwriter) (born 1986), Maltese-English screenwriter
