= Uniform Investment Adviser Law Exam =

Uniform Investment Adviser Law Examination, also called the Series 65 exam, is a test taken by individuals in the United States who seek to become licensed investment adviser representatives. The exam covers topics necessary to provide investment advice to clients.

The Uniform Investment Adviser Law Examination was developed by the North American Securities Administrators Association (NASAA) and is administered by the Financial Industry Regulatory Authority (FINRA). Each Series 65, Uniform Investment Adviser Law Examination, contains a total of 140 questions. One hundred thirty (130) of the questions count toward whether the candidate passes or fails the Series 65 exam. The other 10 questions are pretest and could appear in any position within the exam but do not count towards the final grade. To pass the Series 65 Exam, candidates must correctly answer at least 92 of the 130 scored questions. Applicants have 180 minutes to complete the exam.

The Uniform Investment Adviser Law Examinations are assembled by FINRA using a process called "on the fly." Each question in the pool has two parameters that are used as part of the assembly, a difficulty parameter and a content parameter. Each exam is assembled to meet the exam specifications for content and to have the same difficulty level as all other exams in the same Series.

== Examination ==
The Uniform Investment Adviser Law Examination consists of 130 questions plus 10 pretest questions that cover topics applicants must know to provide investment advice to clients. Applicants have 180 minutes to complete the examination, and must answer at least 94 (72%) of the questions correctly to pass the Series 65 exam.

The graded exam questions are categorized as follows:

SUBJECT MATTER	WEIGHTING	NUMBER OF QUESTIONS
Economic Factors and Business Information	15%	20
Investment Vehicle Characteristics	25%	32
Client Investment Recommendations and Strategies	30%	39
Laws, Regulations and Guidelines Including Prohibition on Unethical Business Practices	30%	39
TOTALS	100%	130

There are a total of 140 questions, but an extra 10 questions do not count towards the final grade.

The examination is a closed book test and test takers are required to appear in person. On completion of the examination, the score for each section and the overall test score are immediately available to the candidate. Prior to January 1, 2010, a score of 68.5% was required to pass. To achieve a passing score, it is generally recommended applicants prepare for the exam with a high-quality prep course and practice tests to simulate test conditions.

== Registration ==
Individuals providing investment advice are called "Investment Adviser Representatives" (IAR). These IARs must generally complete The Uniform Investment Adviser Law Examination (see List of securities examinations) known as the Series 65 Exam, or by meeting the exam waiver requirement by holding one or more of the following pre-qualifying designations:

- Certified Financial Planner (CFP), conferred by the Certified Financial Planner Board of Standards (CFP Board).
- Chartered Financial Consultant (ChFC), conferred by the American College of Financial Services (The American College).
- Personal Financial Specialist (PFS). conferred by the American Institute of Certified Public Accountants (AICPA).
- Chartered Financial Analyst (CFA), offered internationally by the CFA Institute.
- Chartered Investment Counselor (CIC), a designation no longer offered but still maintained by the Investment Advisor Association.
- Certified Investment Management Analyst® (CIMA®), offered by Investments & Wealth Institute

== History ==
Since August 2020, when the SEC broadened the definition of accredited investor, the Series 65 exam is the only qualifying exam that doesn't require the sponsorship of a firm.

== See also ==
- List of securities examinations
- Series 7 exam
- Series 24 exam
- Series 63 exam
- Financial Industry Regulatory Authority (FINRA)
- https://www.series65examtutor.com
