= Chartered financial consultant =

Qualification for professional financial planners

Chartered financial consultant (ChFC) is the advanced financial planning designation awarded by The American College of Financial Services to individuals that have completed the specific training and have had three years of relevant business experience. Charter holders use the designation ChFC on their resumes and are qualified to provide comprehensive advanced financial planning for individuals, professionals, and small business owners.

The authority to use the ChFC mark is granted by the Certification Committee of the Board of Trustees of The American College, and is contingent on adherence to a set of ethical guidelines. According to the American College, "[a]ll ChFC advisors are required to do the same for clients that they would do for themselves in similar circumstances, the standard of ethical behaviour most beneficial for their clients."

Since 1982, approximately 40,000 people have earned the ChFC through regionally accredited program courses and exams. Successful completion of the ChFC qualifies designees to register as an Investment Adviser Representative (IAR) with FINRA without sitting for the Series 65 examination.

== Requirements ==
To secure the designation, applicants must have three years of full-time business experience within the preceding five years and must complete nine college-level courses, equivalent to 27 semester credit hours (9 courses). Students must master over 100 topics on integrated advanced financial planning, covering areas such as

- Financial planning: process and environment
- Insurance planning
- Employee benefits planning
- Income tax planning
- Estate tax, gift tax, and transfer tax planning
- Asset protection planning
- Retirement planning
- Estate planning
- Applications of comprehensive financial planning and consulting

Exams are closed-book and proctored for each course much like any business course offered by an accredited institution. To maintain the designation, holders must complete 30 hours of continuing education every two years and adhere to The American College Code of Ethics and Procedures. The American College is Accredited By Middle States Commission on Higher Education Agency. Those who have earned the ChFC designation have also met the educational requirements to sit for the CFP (Certified Financial Planner) Board exam. Those with a college degree who have passed the ChFC program may apply for the CWM Chartered Wealth Manager credential which is conferred from a TUV Accredited and ISO Certified 29990 certification body. Global Academy of Finance and Management

== See also ==
- Financial planner
- History of certifications in financial planning across the globe
- Financial adviser
- Wealth management
- Investment advisor
- List of securities examinations
