= List of securities examinations =

The following is a list of securities examinations and the organizations that offer them.

== Africa ==
- The Securities Industry Training Institute East Africa (SITI) was conceptualized in 2008 to standardize and administer market education for the East African region. It is a joint effort involving the region's Central Depository & Settlement Corporation Ltd (CDSC) and the following exchanges:
  - Uganda Securities Exchange Ltd (USE)
  - Kenya's Nairobi Securities Exchange Ltd (NSE)
  - Tanzania's Dar-es-Salaam Stock Exchange Ltd (DSE)
  - the Rwanda Stock Exchange.
- Ethiopia Institute of Financial Studies (EIFS) training program
- Ghana Stock Exchange (GSE) Securities Courses
- Namibia Stock Exchange (NSX) semi-annual Stock-brokering Exams
- Nigerian Stock Exchange (NSE) offers a few certificate programs including:
  - Module 1: The role and responsibilities of compliance officers in the capital market
  - Module 2: Compliance risk-based monitoring programmes
  - Module 3: Conduct of business obligations of a broker dealer firm
  - Module 4: Anti–money laundering and terrorist financing
  - Module 5: Capital market operations
- South Africa:
  - The South African Institute of Financial Markets (SAIFM) offers the specific technical exams required with regard to the "Regulated Positions" of trader, compliance officer, and settlement officer, at the JSE Stock Exchange, JSE Debt Market, South African Futures Exchange, AltX, and STRATE.
  - SAIFM also offers the "Registered Persons" examinations, required for licensing as financial market "practitioners" on the various exchanges, selecting up to 8 according to the requirements of the exchange for the specific function; the typical roles here are investment advisor and fund manager, as well as those executing transactions. (Additional to these, it offers various training courses and workshops.)
  - The South African Institute of Stockbrokers administers the six exams required to become a qualified stockbroker, so as to manage a member firm of the JSE; other requirements are 3 years' work experience, and specified education.

== Asia Pacific (ASEAN Plus Three) ==
=== Indonesia ===
- Indonesia Stock Exchange (IDX) Educational Programs
  - IDX Basic Education Program
  - IDX Intermediate Education Program
  - IDX Advance Education Program
- The Indonesia Capital Market Institute (TICMI) / The Committee For Capital Market Professional Standards (PSPPM)
  - Wakil Perantara Pedagang Efek (WPPE) / Broker Dealer Representative
  - Wakil Manajer Investasi (WMI) / Investment Manager Representative
  - Wakil Penjamin Emisi Efek (WPEE) / Underwriter Representative
  - Ahli Syariah Pasar Modal (ASPM) / Shariah Capital Market Professional

=== Singapore ===
- Singapore College of Insurance (SCI)

=== Malaysia ===
The Securities Commission of Malaysia (Suruhanjaya Sekuriti Malaysia) provides an overview of licensing/certification in the country for those who deal in securities, derivatives, financial planning, etc.

For actual exam detail, see SIDC

- Module 6: Stock Market and Securities Law
- Module 7: Financial Statement Analysis and Asset Valuation
- Module 9: Funds Management Regulation
- Module 10: Asset and Funds Management
- Module 11: Fundamentals of Compliance
- Module 12: Investment Management and Corporate Finance
- Module 14: Futures and Options
- Module 16: Rules and Regulations of Futures and Options
- Module 17: Securities and Derivatives Trading (Rules and Regulations)
- Module 18: Securities and Derivatives Trading (Products and Analysis)
- Module 19: Advisory Services (Rules and Regulations)
- Module 19A: Advisory Services (Rules and Regulations) - Part A
- Module 19B: Advisory Services (Rules and Regulations) - Part B

=== China ===
- ATA

For Futures Practitioners:

- China Futures Association
  - Futures Practitioner Exam
  - Futures Analyst Exam

=== Hong Kong, S.A.R. ===
- The Hong Kong Securities and Investment Institute (HKSI)
- Joint Programs with HKSI
  - Hong Kong Exchanges and Clearing Limited (HKEx)
  - The Chartered Institute for Securities & Investment (CISI)
  - The Hong Kong Polytechnic University
  - The City University of Hong Kong

=== India ===
- National Institute of Securities Markets
- National Stock Exchange of India NCMP Certified Market Professional
- Bombay Stock Exchange Training & Certification

=== Japan ===
- Core Knowledge Inc
- Japanese Securities Dealers Association (JSDA)
- FINRA Series 47

=== Philippines ===
- Securities Representative Certification Exam (SRCE)
- Associated Persons Certification Exam (APCE)
- The Investment Company Representative Certification Program (ICRCP)

=== Thailand ===
- Securities Analysts Association (SAA)

=== Cambodia ===
- Financial Institute of Cambodia (FIC)

== Global ==
- ACI The Financial Markets Association, f.k.a. Association Cambiste Internationale, offers a full 'suite of examinations' including Dealing & Operations certificates, among others
- CFA Institute
- Certified Futures and Options Analyst (CFOA), an examination focused on derivatives offered by the ICFDT.
- Securities & Investment Institute (SII) for Islamic/Syariah Finance
- Thomson Reuters

== The Middle East ==
- The Israel Securities Authority requires six exams and an internship to become a portfolio manager. Exams:
  - Securities Law and Ethics
  - Accounting
  - Statistics and Finance
  - Economics
  - Securities and Financial Instrument Analysis
  - Portfolio management
- Capital Market Authority (Saudi Arabia)
  - General Securities Qualification Examination (CME-1)
  - Compliance & Anti–money laundering/CTF (CME2)
  - Broker-Dealer Qualification Certificate (CME-3)
- Various courses for The U.A.E. (Dubai, Abu Dhabi), Kuwait, Bahrain, Saudi Arabia

== North America ==
=== Canada ===
- Canadian Securities Institute (CSI) – variety of exams for certification.
- IFSE Institute (IFSE) – variety of exams for certification.

=== United States ===
The following is a list of the U.S. Financial Industry Regulatory Authority (FINRA), NASAA, and National Futures Association (NFA) financial securities examinations. Most FINRA examinations are divided into two categories: Registered Representative and Registered Principal levels. An asterisk designates that there is no sponsorship requirement in order take the exam.

==== Registered representative level ====
- SIE – Securities Industry Essentials Exam*
- Series 00 – General Securities Principal Exam (Discontinued)
- Series 1 – Registered Representative Exam (Discontinued)
- Series 2 – Non-Member General Securities Exam (Discontinued)
- Series 3 – National Commodities Futures Exam*
- Series 5 – Interest Rate Options Exams
- Series 6 – Investment Company and Variable Contracts Exam (Mutual Funds Broker/Variable Annuities)
- Series 7 – General Securities Representative Exam (Stockbroker)
- Series 11 – Assistant Representative – Order Processing
- Series 15 – Foreign Currency Options Exam
- Series 17 – United Kingdom Securities Representative Exam
- Series 22 – Direct Participation (Limited partnerships) Exam
- Series 30 – NFA Branch Manager Exam
- Series 31 – Futures – Managed Funds Exam*
- Series 32 – Limited Futures Exam - Regulations
- Series 37 – Canada Securities Representative Exam - With Options
- Series 38 – Canada Securities Representative Exam - No Options
- Series 42 – Registered Options Representative Exam
- Series 44 – NYSE Arca Options Market Maker Exam
- Series 47 – Japanese Module of the General Securities Exam
- Series 50 – Municipal Advisor Representative Exam
- Series 52 – Municipal Securities Representative Exam
- Series 55 – Equity Trader – Limited Representative Exam
- Series 56 – Proprietary Trader Qualification Exam
- Series 57 – Securities Trader Qualification Exam
- Series 62 – Corporate Securities – Limited Representative Exam (Discontinued)
- Series 63 – Uniform Securities Agent State Law Exam*
- Series 65 – Uniform Investment Adviser Law Exam*
- Series 66 – Uniform Combined State Law Exam (Combined 63 and 65)*
- Series 72 – Government Securities – Limited Representative
- Series 79 – Investment Banking Exam
- Series 82 – Private Securities Offerings – Limited Representative
- Series 86 – Research Analyst – Securities Analysis
- Series 87 – Research Analyst – Regulations
- Series 99 – Operations Professional

==== Registered principal level ====
- Series 4 – Registered Options Principal Exam
- Series 8 – General Securities Sales Supervisor Exam – Options Module & General Module (Discontinued)
- Series 9 – General Securities Sales Supervisor Exam – Options
- Series 10 – General Securities Sales Supervisor Exam – General Module
- Series 12 – NYSE Branch Manager
- Series 14 – NYSE Compliance Officer
- Series 14A – NYSE DMM Compliance Official Examination
- Series 16 – NYSE Supervisory Analyst
- Series 23 – General Securities Principal (Upgrade from Series 9 and 10)
- Series 24 – General Securities Principal Exam
- Series 26 – Investment Company and Variable Contracts Products Principal Exam
- Series 27 – Financial and Operations Principal Exam
- Series 28 – Financial and Operations Principal Introducing Broker Exam
- Series 39 – Direct Participation Programs Principal Exam
- Series 51 – Municipal Fund Securities Limited Principal
- Series 53 – Municipal Securities Principal Exam

== Latin America ==
=== Brazil ===
Issued by ANBIMA (Brazilian Association of Financial and Capital Markets):

- CPA-10 (Securities Representative - for Retail Investors)
- CPA-20 (Securities Representative - for Qualified Investors)
- CEA (Retail Account Financial Advisor)
- CGA (Professional Portfolio Management)
- AAI (Autonomous Investment Agent)

Issued by APIMEC (Brazilian Association of Investment and Capital Markets Professionals):

- CNPI (Fundamental Securities Research) [Required for all fundamental sell-side research analysts]
- CNPI-T (Technical Securities Research) [Required for all technical sell-side research analysts]
- CNPI-P (Fundamental and Technical Securities Research)

=== Costa Rica ===
- Securities broker license
- Operator and promoter in currency derivatives

== Europe ==
- Irish Stock Exchange Xetra Exam
- Chartered Institute for Securities & Investment (CISI) (United Kingdom)
- The Finnish Society of Financial Analysts
- Courses & Seminars in English, offered by Oslo Stock Exchange
- Courses & Seminars in Norwegian/Norsk, offered by Oslo Stock Exchange
- SwedSec Licensiering AB, subsidiary of the Swedish Securities Dealers Association
- The European Federation of Financial Analysts Societies

== See also ==
- Registered Representative
- Registered Investment Advisor
