= Compare Travel Insurance =

Australian travel insurance price comparison website

Compare Travel insurance
- Industry: Insurance
- Founded: 2005
- Headquarters: Sydney, Australia
- Area served: Australia and New Zealand
- Key people: Natalie Ball (Director)
- Products: Travel Insurance
- Brands: Comparetravelinsurance.com.au; Comparetravelinsurance.co.nz
- Number of employees: 15 (2019)
- Parent: CoverDirect
- Website: www.comparetravelinsurance.com.au

Compare Travel Insurance is an Australian travel insurance price comparison website, comparing the policies of more than 20 travel insurance brands. Owned and operated by CoverDirect Pty Ltd, it has directors and shareholders in common with 1Cover, i-Trek, Ski-Insurance and Zoom Travel Insurance. The site also operates in New Zealand, as Comparetravelinsurance.co.nz.

== Operations and history ==
The company holds an Australian Financial Services Licence, and all article researchers, writers and customer service professionals are certified as Tier 1 or Tier 2 financial product advisers under the Australian Securities & Investments Commission's regulation RG146.

In 2014, travel booking site Webjet partnered with Comparetravelinsurance.com.au and listed their policies for comparison.

STA Travel and Travel Insurance Saver listed their travel insurance policies with Comparetravelinsurance.com.au in 2015, as did UK and Ireland travel insurance brand, Multitrip, which entered the Australian market through the comparison site.

In 2016, Fairfax Media entered the insurance market through the site with the launch of travel insurance product, Traveller Insure.

== Advertising ==
In February 2012, an advertisement for the website, featuring a fat man, a man with dwarfism, and a chainsaw was banned by the Ad Standards Bureau for demeaning fat people. The ad was however not found to demean dwarfs as the man with dwarfism was shown in a positive light. The ad, created by Blow Communications, won Mumbrella's January 2012 'Ad of the Month'. An edited version was released to YouTube in May 2012, and by August 2019 had been viewed some 7.2 million times.

The company's branding is centred around geeky insurance guru Eugene Wylde. In 2016, Wylde featured in a video advertising campaign dressed as a thieving chimpanzee, a rabid dog, and a disappointed skier dressed in tropical attire, to highlight problems travellers might face abroad and the value of travel insurance. The series later featured Wylde dressed as a tooth with toothache.
