= CPWA =

CPWA may refer to:

- Certified Private Wealth Advisor
- Church of the Province of West Africa
- Certified Professional in Web Accessibility
- College Place, Washington
- A variant of the Volkswagen EA211 engine
