= Series 6 exam =

Finance exam

In the United States, the Investment Company and Variable Contracts Products Representative Examination, is commonly referred to as the Series 6 exam. Individuals passing this multiple choice exam are licensed to sell a limited set of securities products:

- Mutual funds
- Closed-end funds on the initial offering only
- Unit investment trusts
- Variable Annuities

A Series 6 registered individual is not a stockbroker since Series 6 license holders cannot sell stock, other corporate securities, direct participation programs (DPPs), or option products.

This exam is administered by the Financial Industry Regulatory Authority (FINRA, previously known as the NASD). In order to take the exam, an individual must be sponsored by a member firm of either FINRA or a self-regulatory organization (SRO). The cost of the exam is $40. Individuals are allowed 90 minutes to complete 50 multiple choice questions. The passing score is 70%, and those who fail this exam must wait thirty days before taking it again. In order to be registered with the Series 6, an individual must also pass the Securities Industry Essentials Exam (The SIE Exam).

The table below lists the allocation of exam questions for each main job function of an investment company and variable contracts products representative.

Job Functions	Number of Questions
Function 1 – Seeks Business for the Broker-dealer from Customers and Potential Customers	12
Function 2 – Opens Accounts After Obtaining and Evaluating Customers’ Financial Profile and Investment Objectives	8
Function 3 – Provides Customers with Information About Investments, Makes Suitable Recommendations, Transfers Assets and Maintains Appropriate Records	25
Function 4 – Obtains and Verifies Customers’ Purchase and Sales Instructions; Processes, Completes and Confirms Transactions	5

== See also ==
- List of securities examinations
- Series 7 exam
- Series 24 exam
- Series 63 exam
- Financial Industry Regulatory Authority (FINRA)

== Sources ==
- Series 6 at the Financial Industry Regulatory Authority
- Series 6 Exam Tutor (via FINRA's series 6 content outline)
