= Certified Financial Education Instructor =

Certified Financial Education Instructor (CFEI) is a professional certification in the United States for instructors in personal finance. It is administered by the National Financial Educators Council and recognized by the Financial Industry Regulatory Authority.

Notable CFEIs include Alison Kosik, Vince Shorb, and Bola Sokunbi.

== See also ==
- Financial advisor
- Global Association of Risk Professionals
- Professional certification
