= General Securities Principal Exam =

Type of securities license

The general securities principal exam, commonly referred to as the Series 24 exam, is administered by the U.S. Financial Industry Regulatory Authority (FINRA) which qualifies a registered individual to supervise or manage branch activities such as corporate securities, REITs, variable contracts, and venture capital; a general principal may also approve advertising and sales literature, including communications regarding municipal securities. The exam covers topics such as supervision of investment banking, trading, customer accounts, and the primary/secondary markets.

A Series 24 license does not qualify an individual to function as a:

- Registered options principal – Series 4
- General securities sales supervisor for options and municipal securities – Series 9
- Municipal securities principal – Series 53
- Municipal fund securities principal – Series 51
- Financial and operations principal – Series 27
- Introducing broker/dealer financial and operations principal – Series 28

The Series 24 Exam is made up of 150 questions. Candidates have up to 3.5 hours to take the exam. 70% (105 correct answers) is considered a passing grade. In order to take the Series 24 exam, a candidate must be sponsored by a member firm of FINRA or another SRO (self-regulatory organization).

| Test breakdown | Number of questions | % of exam |
|---|---|---|
| Supervision of investment banking activities | 33 | 22% |
| Supervision of trading and market making activities | 31 | 21% |
| Supervision of brokerage office operations | 29 | 19% |
| Sales supervision; general supervision of employees; regulatory framework of FINRA | 43 | 29% |
| Compliance with financial responsibility rules | 14 | 9% |

== See also ==
- Financial Industry Regulatory Authority (FINRA)
- List of securities examinations
- Series 7
- Series 63
