= Alternative display facility =

Alternative display facility (ADF) is an equity trading platform created in the United States established by the Financial Industry Regulatory Authority (FINRA), a self-regulatory organization (SRO). The ADF is an alternative to the exchange for publishing quotations and for comparing and reporting trades. This differs from a trading facility with execution capabilities (stock exchange) in that the exchange would simply send a notice of execution back to the owner of the displayed order. FINRA has operated an ADF since July 29, 2002.
