= Chartered Financial Analyst =

Professional credential offered by the CFA Institute

The Chartered Financial Analyst (CFA) program is a postgraduate professional certification offered internationally by the US-based CFA Institute (formerly the Association for Investment Management and Research, or AIMR) to investment and financial professionals. The program teaches a wide range of subjects relating to advanced investment analysis—including business analysis, statistics, probability theory, fixed income, derivatives, economics, financial analysis, corporate finance, alternative investments, portfolio management, ethics applicable to the finance industry—and provides a generalist knowledge of other areas of finance.

A candidate who successfully completes the program and meets other professional requirements is awarded the "CFA charter" and becomes a "CFA charterholder". Successful candidates take an average of four years to earn their CFA charter.

== History ==
The predecessor of the CFA Institute, the Financial Analysts Federation (FAF), was established in 1947 as a service organization for investment professionals. The FAF founded the Institute of Chartered Financial Analysts in 1962; the earliest CFA charterholders were "grandfathered" in through work experience only, but then a series of three examinations was established along with a requirement to be a practitioner for several years before taking the exams. In 1990, in the hopes of boosting the credential's public profile, the CFA Institute (formerly the Association for Investment Management and Research) merged with the FAF and the Institute of Chartered Financial Analysts.

The CFA exam was first administered in 1963 and began in the United States and Canada, but has become global with many people becoming charterholders across Europe, Asia, and Australia. By 2003, fewer than half the candidates in the CFA program were based in the United States and Canada, with most of the other candidates based in Asia or Europe. The number of charterholders in India and China had increased by 25% and 53%, respectively, from 2005 to 2006.

== CFA Charter ==
The CFA designation is designed to demonstrate a strong foundation in advanced investment analysis and portfolio management, accompanied by a strict emphasis on ethical practice.

A charterholder is held to the highest ethical standards. Once an investment professional obtains the charter, this individual also makes an annual commitment to uphold and abide by a strict professional code of conduct and ethical standards. Violations of the CFA Code of Ethics may result in industry-related sanctions, suspension of the right to use the CFA designation, or a revocation of membership.

=== Requirements ===
To become a CFA charterholder, candidates must satisfy the following requirements:

- Have obtained a bachelor's degree or equivalent or be an undergraduate whose selected examination window is no more than 23 months before graduation.
- Complete at least one Practical Skills Module (PSM) at each program level before the corresponding examination result is released.
- Pass all three levels of the CFA program (mastery of the current CFA curriculum and passing three examinations).
- Have 4,000 hours in a minimum of three years of qualified work experience acceptable by the CFA Institute. However, individual-level exams may be taken prior to satisfying this requirement.
- Have two or three letters of reference.
- Become a member of the CFA Institute.
- Adhere to the CFA Institute Code of Ethics and Standards of Professional Conduct.

Due to the timing of the exams, completing all three levels of the CFA is possible within two years, but candidates must still complete the work experience requirement of 4,000 hours over a minimum of three years to become a charterholder.

=== Pass rates ===
In 2021, the CFA program made news headlines after the level I examination pass rate dropped to a record-low of 25%. In August 2021, the level II pass rate fell to 29%.

== Curriculum ==
The curriculum for the CFA program is based on a Candidate Body of Knowledge established by the CFA Institute. The CFA curriculum is updated annually to reflect the latest best practices, with the extent of changes varying by year and level. The curriculum comprises, broadly, the topic areas below. There are three exams ("levels") that test the academic portion of the CFA program. All three levels emphasize the subject of ethics. The material differences among the exams are:

- The Level I study program emphasizes tools and inputs and includes an introduction to asset valuation, financial reporting and analysis, and portfolio-management techniques.
- The Level II study program emphasizes asset valuation and includes applications of the tools and inputs (including economics, financial reporting and analysis, and quantitative methods) in asset valuation.
- The Level III study program emphasizes portfolio management and includes descriptions of strategies for applying the tools, inputs, and asset valuation models to manage equity, fixed income, and derivative investments for individuals and institutions. Since 2025, CFA Institute has introduced a Core curriculum plus a choice of 3 elective options called Specialized Pathways: Portfolio Management, Private Markets and Private Wealth.

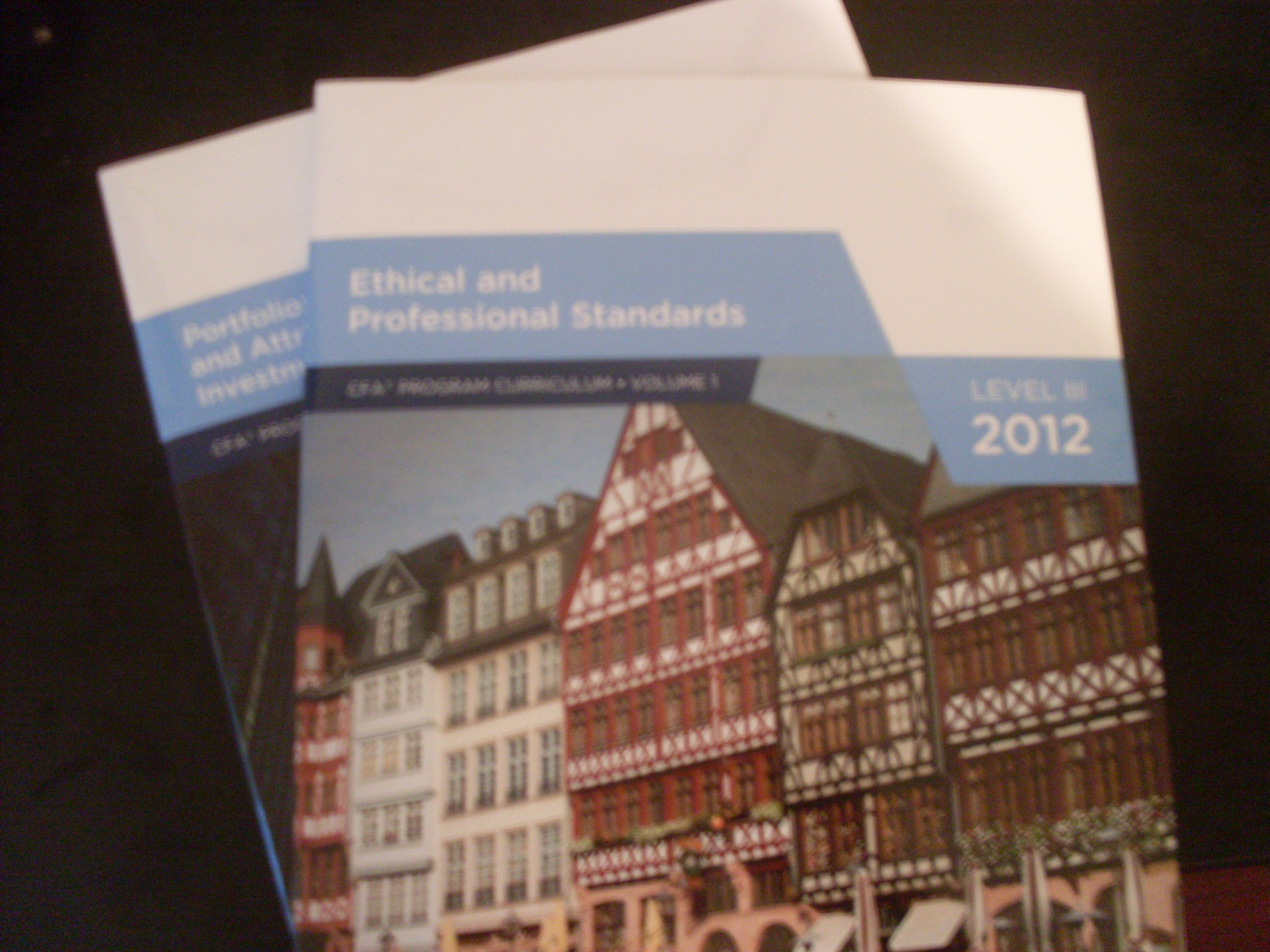
2012 Level III CFA Program Curriculum

For exams from 2008 onward, candidates are automatically provided the curriculum readings from the CFA Institute at the time of registration for the exam. If the student fails an exam and is allowed to retest in the same year, the CFA Institute offers a slight rebate and will not send the curriculum again (the curriculum changes only on an annual basis). If the student retests in a year other than the year of failure, he or she will receive the curriculum again, as it may have been changed. Study materials for the CFA exams are available from numerous commercial learning providers, although they are not officially endorsed. Various organizations (some officially accredited) also provide course-based preparation. As of 2019, the examination includes questions on artificial intelligence, automated investment services, and mining unconventional sources of data.

=== Ethical and professional standards ===
The ethics section is primarily concerned with compliance and reporting rules when managing an investor's money or when issuing research reports. Some rules pertain more generally to professional behavior (such as prohibitions against plagiarism); others specifically relate to the proper use of the designation for charterholders and candidates. These rules are delineated in the "Standards of Professional Conduct", within the context of an overarching "Code of Ethics".

=== Quantitative methods ===
This topic area is dominated by statistics: the topics are fairly broad, covering probability theory, hypothesis testing, (multi-variate) regression, and time-series analysis. Other topics include time value of money—incorporating basic valuation and yield and return calculations—portfolio-related calculations, and technical analysis. Recent additions, as mentioned above, are a survey of machine learning and big data.

=== Economics ===
Both microeconomics and macroeconomics are covered, including international economics (mainly related to currency conversions and how they are affected by international interest rates and inflation). By Level III, the focus is on applying economic analysis to portfolio management and asset allocation.

=== Financial statement analysis ===
The curriculum includes financial reporting topics (International Financial Reporting Standards and U.S. Generally Accepted Accounting Principles), and ratio and financial statement analysis. Financial reporting and analysis of accounting information is heavily tested at Levels I and II, but is not a significant part of Level III.

=== Corporate ===
Corporate finance topics include capital investment decisions, capital structure policy and implementation, and dividend policy; building on accounting, economics, and statistics. It then extends to more advanced topics such as the analysis of mergers and acquisitions, corporate governance, and business and financial risk.

=== Security analysis ===
The curriculum includes coverage of global markets as well as analysis and valuation of the various asset types: equity (stocks), fixed income (bonds), derivatives (futures, forwards, options, and swaps), and alternative investments (real estate, private equity, hedge funds, and commodities). The Level I exam requires familiarity with these instruments. Level II focuses on valuation, employing the "tools" studied under quantitative methods, financial statement analysis, corporate finance, and economics. Level III centers on incorporating these instruments into portfolios.

==== Equity and fixed income ====
The curriculum for equity investments includes the functioning of the stock market, indices, stock valuation, and industry analysis. Fixed income topics similarly include the various debt securities, the risk associated with these, and valuations and yield spreads.

==== Derivatives ====
The curriculum includes coverage of the fundamental framework of derivatives markets, derivatives valuations, and hedging and trading strategies involving derivatives, including futures, forwards, swaps, and options. The curriculum incorporates various pricing models and frameworks, such as Black-Scholes and binomial option pricing (extending to coverage of interest rate trees), while coverage of the underlying mathematics is conceptual as opposed to technical.

==== Alternative investments ====
The curriculum includes coverage of a range of topics in the alternative investment category. Topics include hedge funds, private equity, real estate, natural resources (particularly precious metals), infrastructure, and other alternative investments, including, as applicable, strategies, sub-categories, potential benefits and risks, fee structures, and due diligence.

=== Portfolio management and wealth planning ===
This section increases in importance with each of the three levels—it integrates and draws from the other topics, including ethics. It includes: (i) modern portfolio theory (efficient frontier, capital asset pricing model, etc.); (ii) investment practice (defining the investment policy for individual and institutional investors, resultant asset allocation, order execution, and hedging using derivatives); and (iii) measurement of investment performance.

== Efficacy of the CFA program ==
Given the time and effort that candidates must undergo to complete the CFA program, it would be expected that CFA charterholders have higher performance than those who do not complete the program. Academic research has suggested evidence that differential performance is economically significant, supporting the predominance of signaling. Furthermore, research in the Financial Analysts Journal (a journal published by CFA Institute) suggests a positive human capital impact from the CFA program.

== Global regulatory and legal recognition ==
=== Legal recognition by country ===
==== Australia ====
- The Australian Securities and Investments Commission (ASIC) has ranked the RG 146 Gap Training Program for CFA charterholders and CFA Program candidates at Tier 1. The RG 146 Gap Training Program is intended for candidates who have passed the CFA Level I exam or charterholders who wish to fulfill the requirements necessary to provide both financial product advice to retail clients and personal advice.
- The Government of Australia recognizes CFA charterholders as having automatically satisfied Standard Sets A, C, and D under the Code of Professional Conduct for Authorized Financial Advisers (AFA).
- Macquarie University recognizes completion of CFA Level III as equivalent to a bachelor’s degree in a relevant discipline in the admissions process. Similarly, successful completion of CFA Level I or II, combined with a bachelor’s degree in a non-relevant discipline, will be treated as a bachelor’s degree in a relevant discipline in the admissions process. Students who have passed CFA Levels I, II, or III are eligible for course waivers.
- Griffith University recognizes that students who have passed the CFA Level I exam are exempt from the GMAT, GRE, and BAT score requirements, as well as the requirement of completing a specialized undergraduate degree in finance. Applicants who have passed the CFA Level 1 exam are eligible for 40 CP credits (four courses) in the foundation component of the Master of Finance program.

==== Bahrain ====
- The Central Bank of Bahrain (CBB) recognizes CFA charterholders as meeting the requirements for the regulated functions of Head of Treasury, Financial Instruments Trader, and Investment Consultant.
- CFA charterholders automatically satisfy the requirements for the mandatory Financial Advice Program (AFP) level II.

==== Brazil ====
- Comissão de Valores Mobiliários (CVM) recognizes successful CFA Level III candidates as satisfying the requirements of taking the global content exams of the National Certificate of Professional Investment (CNPI).
- CFA charterholders are recognized by Brazilian main regulator of securities analysts, APIMEC, as the equivalent to their "global content" test, although the candidates must still pass a "local content" test to award their memberships.

==== Canada ====
- The CFA Institute is a recognized Educational Institution by Revenu Quebec
- CFA Charterholders are legally recognized by the Canadian Securities Administrators as qualifying for the position of portfolio manager, investment counsel, adviser in derivatives & commodity futures, exchange contracts and for the position of securities adviser.
- Certain Finance programs are recognized by the CFA Institute as a part of their University Recognition Program. This status is granted to institutions whose degree programs incorporate at least 70 percent of the CFA Program Candidate Body of Knowledge.

==== Egypt ====
- The Egyptian Financial Regulatory Authority (FRA) considers candidates which have passed CFA Level 1 to be exempt from exam requirements for relevant positions.

==== Germany ====
- The Deutsche Börse AG considers the successful completion of the CFA Level III exam as satisfactory for the requirements necessary to be an exchange trader.
- The Frankfurt School of Finance & Management allows elective waivers for passing any level of the CFA exams.

==== Greece ====
- The Capital Market Commission (CMC) waives licensing requirements for the position of investment analyst and portfolio manager for those who have passed CFA Level III.

==== Hong Kong, China ====
- The Government of Hong Kong officially recognizes the CFA Charter as a professional qualification.
- The Hong Kong Securities and Futures Commission (SFC) considers the passing of CFA Level I to be recognized as an industry qualification for various licensing exams.
- The Academic and Accreditation Advisory Committee of the SFC has approved the CFA designation as a recognized industry qualification for the licensing of Responsible Officers in Hong Kong.
- CFA Society Hong Kong (formerly The Hong Kong Society of Financial Analysts Limited) is recognized by the SFC as an institution for providing Continuous Professional Training (CPT). Continuing Education programs and seminars organized by CFA Society Hong Kong qualify for CPT hours.

==== Indonesia ====
- The Financial Services Authority of Indonesia (FSA) requires that any collective investment scheme must have at least one CFA charterholder.

==== Ireland ====
- The Institute of Banking exempts CFA charterholders from 2 out of 6 modules required for the Professional Diploma in Financial Advice.

==== Israel ====
- The Israel Securities Authority (ISA) requires six exams and an internship to become a portfolio manager. Exams include securities law and ethics, accounting, statistics, and finance; economics; securities and financial instrument analysis; and portfolio management. CFA charterholders are automatically considered to have completed five out of six exams.

==== Malaysia ====
- The Securities Commission Malaysia (SC) requires Capital Markets Services Representatives License (CMSRL) applicants to pass various exams. CFA charterholders are waived from four exams.

==== Mexico ====
- The Comision Nacional del Sistema de Ahorro para el Retiro (CONSAR) grants the general finance certification permanent license to people who have completed the CFA Institute Investment Foundations Program.

==== Netherlands ====
- The Dutch Securities Institute (DSI) recognizes the completion of the CFA Level 1 exam as being sufficient for the qualification to be a financial analyst.
- The Dutch Securities Institute (DSI) recognizes CFA charterholders as automatically meeting the qualifications requirement to be a senior fund manager.

==== Peru ====
- The Superintendencia del Mercado de Valores (SMV) recognizes applicants who have passed CFA Level I to be approved for the role of portfolio manager.

==== Philippines ====
- The Securities and Exchange Commission of the Philippines requires at least one fund manager to have passed CFA Level 1 in order to manage mutual funds.

==== Portugal ====
- The Comissão do Mercado de Valores Mobiliários (CMVM) (Portuguese Securities Market Commission) officially recognizes a CFA charterholder as fully satisfying the qualifications to register as an investment adviser or financial analyst.

==== Saudi Arabia ====
- The Capital Market Authority (CMA) recognizes CFA charterholders as sophisticated investors and they are exempted from CMA exam level I.

==== Singapore ====
- The Monetary Authority of Singapore (MAS) recognizes CFA charterholders seeking to apply for a license as a Capital Markets Services (CMS) Representative to be exempt from modules 6 and 7 of the Capital Markets and Financial Advisory Services (CMFAS) Exam.

==== South Africa ====
- The FAIS licensing process for Financial Service Providers (FSP) exempts CFA charterholders from category I, II, IIA, III, and IV of the FSP's entry level qualification for the Key Individuals and Representatives licensing process.
- Exemptions are available for various modules in the South African Institute of Financial Markets "Registered Persons Examination", depending on the candidate's level. No exemptions are available for the examination on local market regulations and compliance.
- The South African Qualifications Authority has bench-marked the CFA charter as comparable to its National Certificate in Financial Markets and Instruments.
- Exemptions are available to charterholders for two of the six qualifying exams of the South African Institute of Stockbrokers.

==== Spain ====
- Candidates who have passed Level 1 of the CFA Program are able to apply for the Certified Advisor (CAd) designation, a certification awarded by the CFA Society of Spain. CAd certification is recognized by Spain’s national securities regulator, the CNMV, as meeting the requirements of the European Union’s MiFID II directive for investment professionals who engage in any type of client advisory. Candidates must also pass the CAd test on Spanish and EU regulation, commit to the CFA Institute Code of Ethics and Standards of Professional Conduct, and be a local member of CFA Society Spain. CAd certification must be renewed every year by demonstrating 30 hours of continuous professional development (CPD) and reconfirming the observance of the code and standards.

==== Sri Lanka ====
- The Securities and Exchange Commission of Sri Lanka authorizes that CFA charterholders automatically meet the requirement to practice as investment managers, managing client funds.

==== Taiwan ====
- The Securities Investment Trust & Consulting Association (SITCA) of Taiwan officially recognizes CFA charterholders as qualified to practice as securities investment analysts.
- CFA charterholders are not required to sit the Securities Investment Trust Licensing Exam.

==== Thailand ====
- The Securities and Exchange Commission (SEC) of Thailand Passing CFA Level III qualifies the candidate to be a fund manager.

==== Turkey ====
- The Capital Markets Board (CMB) of Turkey considers the passing of CFA Level I, II, and III to be equivalent to the CMA Level 1, 2, and 3 licensing exams.

==== United Kingdom ====
- In 2009, the UK National Academic Recognition Information Centre (UK NARIC) bench-marked the CFA Program and the CFA charter as comparable to a Qualifications and Credit Framework (QCF) Master's Level 7. The levels of the CFA Program were bench-marked as:
  - Level III of the CFA Program and the CFA charter are bench-marked at Level 7 by NARIC
  - Level II of the CFA Program is bench-marked at Level 6 by NARIC
  - Level I of the CFA Program is bench-marked at Level 5 by NARIC

==== United States ====
- The CMT Association exempts candidates who have passed CFA Level I from its CMT Level 1 exam on technical analysis.
- The Financial Industry Regulatory Authority (FINRA) exempts candidates who have passed CFA Level I and II from the Series 86 examination from registering as research analysts.
- The Investment Adviser Registration Depository (IARD) exempts CFA charterholders from the required competency exams to register as an investment adviser.
- The North American Securities Administrators Association (NASAA) exempts CFA charterholders from the required Series 65 exams to register as investment advisers.
- The New York Stock Exchange (NYSE) exempts candidates who have passed CFA level I from the portion of the Series 16 exam that deals with rules on research standards and related matters from Part II of the NYSE Supervisory Analyst Qualification Exam.
- The National Football League Players Association (NFLPA) recognizes the CFA Charter as meeting the eligibility requirements to become a registered player financial advisor.
- The University of California, Berkeley, considers Master of Business Administration (MBA) candidates who have passed the CFA Level III exam to be granted an automatic waiver in two core courses.
- The University of Notre Dame considers CFA charterholders in the Executive Master of Nonprofit Administration (EMNA) to be eligible for a waiver of required course work.
- Boston University considers CFA charterholders to be eligible for waivers for up to two out of 10 courses in the Master of Science in Financial Management (MSFM) on-campus and online degree programs.
- Duke University considers students enrolled in its graduate business programs who have passed the CFA Level III exam to be eligible for an unconditional administrative exemption from Finance 645.

==== Vietnam ====
- The State Securities Commission (SSC) considers candidates who have passed CFA Level II to be sufficient in exempting them from three required securities practicing certificates:
  1. Basic issues regarding securities and the securities market
  2. Securities analysis and investment
  3. Analysis of enterprise financial statements

=== Recognition by professional organizations ===
==== CBV Institute ====
Individuals who have passed all three levels of the CFA exams are eligible to skip the elective courses of the CBV Institute Program of Studies.

==== The Society of Actuaries (SOA) ====
The Society of Actuaries (SOA) granted the credit of "Validation by Educational Experience (VEE)-Economics" to the candidates who passed the CFA Level I exam. SOA also granted both the credits of VEE-Corporate Finance and VEE-Applied Statistical Methods to the candidates who passed the CFA Level II exam.

==== Professional Risk Managers' International Association (PRMIA) ====
CFA charterholders are exempted by the Professional Risk Managers' International Association (PRMIA) from the first required exam for the PRM qualification.

==== Certified Financial Planner Board of Standards (CFP Board) ====
The Certified Financial Planner Board of Standards (CFP Board) has approved the CFA charter as fulfilling most of the education coursework requirement for CFP certification, pending completion of a capstone course registered with CFP Board prior to sitting for the CFP exam.

Chartered Alternative Investment Analysts Association (CAIA Association)

The Chartered Alternative Investment Analysts Association offers a Level I exam waiver to CFA charterholders who can present a digital badge verifiable by the CAIA Association.

== Trademark disputes ==
=== India ===
CFA Institute is not affiliated with the Chartered Financial Analyst degree offered by the Institute of Chartered Financial Analysts of India (ICFAI) University of India or its affiliate, the Council of Chartered Financial Analysts (CCFA).

In 1998, CFA Institute's predecessor organization, AIMR, sued and won a judgment in an American court against ICFAI/CCFA. The judgment prohibited ICFAI/CCFA and its members from using the CFA or Chartered Financial Analyst mark in the United States and Canada. In August 2006, an Indian court issued a temporary injunction against the Indian entity, as well.

The judgments made no assessment of the quality of the Indian program and merely discussed the trademark violation. The Indian Association of Investment Professionals is the only organization in India that is affiliated with the CFA Institute. The CFA Institute's trademark rights to the "CFA" and "Chartered Financial Analyst" brands were affirmed in India by the Delhi High Court. Further, the Delhi High Court issued an interim injunction ordering ICFAI and its affiliated Council of Chartered Financial Analysts to stop using CFA Institute trademarks. The Deputy Registrar of Trade Marks determined that the trademark registration issued to CFA Institute for the "CFA" brand must be republished because of an error by the Trade Marks Registry. CFA Institute has numerous trademark applications on file with the Trade Marks Registry, and CFA charterholders from CFA Institute are free to use the "CFA" and "Chartered Financial Analyst" marks throughout India.

On May 8, 2007, the U.S. District Court for the Eastern District of Virginia vacated a default judgment issued against ICFAI that CFA Institute obtained in October 1998. ICFAI had moved to reopen the case and to vacate the default judgment arguing that the court lacked jurisdiction over ICFAI at the time the default judgment was issued. With the default judgement vacated, ICFAI informed Indian CFA charterholders that they could legally use their charter in the United States and Canada. However, on September 4, 2007, the court reversed its decision to vacate after a motion to reconsider that decision was filed by CFA Institute.

=== United Kingdom ===
In January 2007, the UK Trade Marks Registry refused to register "Chartered Financial Analyst" as a trademark, as the word "chartered" in the United Kingdom is associated with bodies incorporated by royal charter and thus "the relevant public in the UK would, prima facie, expect a person using the mark applied for to be representing themselves as a member of an organization of the kind subject to a Royal Charter". "CFA" is a registered trademark in the UK, but only for "Educational services" (class 41) rather than "Financial services" (class 36) under which the attempt to register "Chartered Financial Analyst" had been made.

== See also ==
- Professional certification
- Professional certification in financial services
