= Certified Financial Planner =

Professional certification

The Certified Financial Planner (CFP) certification is a professional certification mark for financial planners conferred by the Certified Financial Planner Board of Standards (CFP Board) in the United States, and by 25 other organizations affiliated with the Financial Planning Standards Board (FPSB), the owner of the CFP mark outside of the United States. The certification is managed by the Certified Financial Planner Board of Standards, Inc. (CFP Board), which was founded in 1985 as a 501(c)(3) non-profit organization; it is neither a government designation nor an accredited degree.

To receive authorization to use the designation, a candidate must meet education, examination, experience, and ethics requirements and pay an ongoing certification fee.

In the United Kingdom, the CFP licence/designation is available to financial planners through membership of the Chartered Institute of Securities & Investment (CISI).

Globally, there are more than 230,648 licensed CFPs, with 57% in Americas, 37% in Asia Pacific, 3.3% in Europe & Middle East and 2% in Africa.

== Requirements for initial certification ==
For initial certification, an individual must meet four categories of requirements: education, examination, experience, and ethics.

=== Education requirements ===
The candidate must have a bachelor's degree (or higher), or its equivalent in any discipline, from an accredited college or university. The bachelor's degree requirement may be completed after passing the CFP exam (within five years) and is not a requirement to be eligible to take the CFP Board Certification Examination. As a first step to the present CFP certification criteria, students must master a curriculum of approximately 100 topics on financial planning.

Individuals holding professional designations pre-approved by the CFP Board, which include attorneys, Certified Public Accountants (CPAs), Chartered Certified Accountants (CCAs), Chartered Accountants (CAs), Chartered Wealth Managers (CWMs), Chartered Life Underwriters (CLUs), Chartered Financial Consultants (ChFCs), and Chartered Financial Analysts (CFAs) are all entitled to register for and take the exam without having to complete the education requirements, by using the CFP-board's "challenge" status. PhDs in business or economics are also exempted from the educational requirements.

Individuals who seek to challenge the CFP certification exam must take a financial planning capstone course before sitting for the exam.

Foreign degrees may be substituted for a U.S. degree if they receive equivalency from a third-party organization. The CFP Board began requiring a college education in 2008. In the early years, for the first 25,000 CFP members, candidates could take the five courses and achieve certification without a comprehensive exam. In 1991 a comprehensive exam became required for new students.

The CFP board and other organizations have communicated with the Consumer Financial Protection Bureau to augment accredited degree standards and ranking of professional designations.

The CFP Certification Examination is a multiple choice, computer-based exam consisting of 170 questions, broken into two sessions separated by a 40-minute break. Candidates have up to three hours to complete each session. The exam includes two case studies, multiple mini-case problem sets and stand-alone questions designed to assess the student's ability to apply their knowledge of the aforementioned areas to financial planning situations.

Students and certificants must adhere to the CFP Board Code of Ethics & Professional Responsibility and the Financial Planning Practice Standards. Registered investment advisors have a fiduciary duty to care for investments. The CFP Board can enforce them through its Disciplinary Rules and Procedures.

== Renewal of certification ==
To maintain certification, in the United States, license holders are required to complete thirty hours of continuing education, of which two hours must be board-approved Ethics CE, and the remaining 28 are General CE.

== Related designations ==
There are over 208 designations available for financial-services professionals. These are some of the more common designations.

- Life and Annuity Certified Professional (LACP), from the National Association of Insurance and Financial Advisors (NAIFA)
- Chartered Alternative Investment Analyst
- Professional Financial Advisor
- Certified Investment Management Analyst (CIMA), Investment Management Consultants Association (IMCA)
- Chartered Certified Accountant
- Chartered Financial Analyst
- Certified Management Accountant
- Chartered Financial Consultant
- Chartered Market Technician
- Certified International Investment Analyst
- Certified Public Accountant
- Financial Risk Manager

== See also ==
- Financial adviser
- List of Securities Examinations
- Registered Investment Advisor
