= Thomas Krebs =

American securities and finance attorney

Thomas L. Krebs is an American securities and finance attorney. Krebs continues to represent the Alabama Securities Commission in select matters and maintains a private securities practice. He is recognized in The Best Lawyers in America for Securities Law.

== Background ==
=== Education ===
Krebs graduated from the University of Virginia in 1966 and was awarded a Juris Doctor degree from the University of Alabama School of Law in 1972.

=== Military service ===
Prior to attending law school, Krebs was an officer in the United States Marine Corps serving in Vietnam as a platoon commander, where he was twice decorated for heroism and meritorious service (Bronze Star with Combat "V", the Navy Commendation Medal with Combat "V" and the Purple Heart Medal).

== Public service ==
=== Alabama Securities Commission ===
Krebs served as the director of the Alabama Securities Commission from 1975 until 1985.

=== Leviticus project ===
In 1978, together with the Honorable Robert Morgenthau, the District Attorney for the County of New York, Krebs founded the Leviticus Project, a six-state, sixteen agency task force organized to investigate and prosecute crime in the coal industry. The Leviticus Project was and continues to be one of the finest state-to-state cooperative investigative programs in the United States. The Leviticus Project created the Prosecutorial Management Information System (PROMIS) which is a clearinghouse for information concerning fraud schemes and con persons. The Leviticus Project organized to fight fraud in the coal industry and expanded to investigate and multi-jurisdictional fraud cases generally.

=== World Securities Conferences ===
In 1980 and 1981 at the request of the then director of the SEC's Division of Enforcement, Judge Stanley Sporkin, Krebs was selected to be a member of the United States delegation to the World Securities Conferences. Krebs served as the commission's director until August 1982.

=== NASAA ===
In 1981, Krebs served as the president of the North American Securities Administrators Association.

=== U.S. Agency for International Development ===
In 1982, Krebs accepted and completed an engagement by the United States Agency for International Development to recommend a program of training for the Amman Financial Market, the securities regulatory agency for the Country of Jordan. Following a six-week study of the Jordanian securities market, Krebs drafted a 108-page report which made specific training proposals for specified AFM personnel, together with a time table for the completion of that training.

=== Utah Securities Division ===
In 1983, the governor of the State of Utah requested that Mr. Krebs consult with and advise his staff regarding the enactment of legislation and the staffing of the Utah Securities Division aimed at stopping the "penny stock" frauds which then plagued that state.

=== Cumberland School of Law ===
In 1986, Krebs taught "Securities Regulation" as an adjunct lecturer at the Cumberland School of Law of Samford University in Birmingham, Alabama.

=== Financial Crisis Inquiry Commission ===
Starting in 2010, Krebs served as the assistant director and Deputy General Counsel of the Financial Crisis Inquiry Commission, where he spearheaded the investigation of securitizations of mortgaged-backed securities, foreclosures and misrepresentations, Lehman Brothers, Bear Sterns and Shadow Banking, among other investigations.

=== House Financial Services Committee ===
Krebs was appointed by Senator Spencer Bachus to serve as senior counsel to the House Financial Services Committee.

== Published writings ==
- Securities Litigation in Alabama: Open shirts, gold chains, and pinkie rings - a guide for widows and orphans, co-authored with David R. Donaldson, 20 Cumberland L.Rev. 481, 531-532 (1990).
- Krebs is under contract with Matthew Bender, edited the Blue Sky Fraud portions of the H. Sowards & N. Hirsch's "Business Organization" (1989).
