= Proper authority =

In Australian corporations law, proper authority is the authorisation provided by a licensed securities dealer to an individual that permits the holder to represent the securities dealer.

== See also ==
- Registered representative (securities), in the United States
