= Bola Sokunbi =

Nigerian-American educator, author, and entrepreneur

Bola Sokunbi is a Nigerian-American personal finance author and social media influencer.

She has contributed to CNBC and Fox Business, and is the author of several books about personal finance, including Grow Your Money and Choosing to Prosper.

She also maintains a personal finance-focused Instagram account, Clever Girl Finance. Sokunbi is a Certified Financial Education Instructor.
