= Joseph Borg (regulator) =

American financial regulator

- Born: 1951 (age 74–75); New York City, New York, US
- Education: Hofstra University School of Law
- Occupation: Financial regulation
- Employer: State of Alabama
- Title: Securities Commissioner
- Term: 1994–present

Joseph P. Borg (born 1951) is an American financial regulator who has served as the Securities Commissioner of Alabama since 1994. In this position, he is responsible for prosecuting financial crimes which affect Alabama residents. He has also served as the president of the North American Securities Administrators Association for two terms. He was described in a 2002 Forbes article as "Wall Street's Worst Nightmare". Smart Money magazine listed Borg in its listing of "The Power 30- The Top Financial Players" citing his 98% conviction rate and calling him "one of the toughest 'stock cops' in America" [Smart Money November, 2011]

== Early life ==
Borg was born in New York City to Maltese immigrants Philip J. Borg and Dorothy Borg (née Chircop). He attended Hofstra University School of Law and then worked as a personal injury lawyer. He moved from Queens to Montgomery, Alabama to work as a defense lawyer in product–liability cases. Borg soon made partner in a Montgomery law firm and later worked as a corporate lawyer for First Alabama Bank.

== Securities regulation ==
Borg represented the victim of a microcap fraud case in 1993.

Borg was first elected as the president of the North American Securities Administrators Association for the 2001–02 term. The NASAA is a nonprofit organization which represents regulators from across North America. He also served in this role for the 2006–07 term and now serves on their board of directors.

== Political views ==
Borg has been critical of the U.S. Securities and Exchange Commission and the Financial Industry Regulatory Authority for not imposing tougher sanctions on financial criminals. He has also argued that financial regulatory power in the U.S. should not be concentrated in one agency. Rather, he proposes that regulatory agencies across the country should attempt to work together more effectively.
