= Uniform Combined State Law Exam =

The Uniform Combined State Law Examination also called the Series 66 exam is designed to qualify candidates as both securities agents and investment adviser representatives in the United States. It was developed by North American Securities Administrators Association (NASAA) and operated by the Financial Industry Regulatory Authority (FINRA).

The Uniform Combined State Law Examination consists of 100 multiple-choice questions and 10 pretest questions. Applicants are allowed 2½ hours (150 minutes) to complete the examination.

The examination is conducted as a closed-book test. Upon completion of the examination, the score for each section and the overall test score will be processed by Financial Industry Regulatory Authority headquarters and made available to the candidate's sponsor.

A score of at least 73% on the Series 66 exam is needed to pass and become eligible for registration as a Registered Investment Adviser Representative. Prior to July 1, 2016, candidates had to attain scores of 75% in order to pass and prior to January 1, 2010, candidates had to attain scores of 71% in order to pass.

- Note: the General Securities Representative Examination (Series 7) is a corequisite exam that needs to be successfully completed in addition to the Series 66 exam before a candidate can apply to register with a state. Candidates may take either exam first but must complete both satisfactorily.

== See also ==
- Series 63
