= Uniform Securities Act =

US model statute

The Uniform Securities Act (USA) is a model statute designed to guide each state in drafting its state securities law. It was created by the National Conference of Commissioners on Uniform State Laws (NCCUSL).

The purpose of the Uniform Securities Act is to provide model legislation that can be adopted by a state to deal with securities fraud at the state level, supplementing enforcement and regulation efforts of the U.S. Securities and Exchange Commission (SEC). Not all investments are covered federally and not all investment dealers are registered at the federal level, so the SEC does not have authority over all securities and securities transactions. As a result, there is a need for state-level security regulations to protect investors with respect to these securities. The Uniform Securities Act provides model legislation that can be enacted by a state to provide this protection. The state security laws are often known as blue sky laws.

The Act was first promulgated in 1930, when it was entitled the Uniform Sales of Securities Act of 1930. The 1930 Act met with limited success, enacted by only five jurisdictions. In 1943, the NCCUSL dropped the Act from its list of Uniform Acts.

The Act was substantially revised in 1956, as the Uniform Securities Act of 1956. This revision was much more successful, and was adopted by 37 jurisdictions. The act was revised again in 1985 as the Uniform Securities Act of 1985, and amended in 1988, but few states adopted these changes, and instead continued to operate under the 1956 Act.

The most recent version of the Act is the Uniform Securities Act of 2002 which was last revised in 2005. As of January 2009, the 2002 Act has been enacted in Georgia, Hawaii, Idaho, Indiana, Iowa, Kansas, Maine, Minnesota, Missouri, Oklahoma, South Carolina, South Dakota, Vermont, Wisconsin and the US Virgin Islands.

The 2002 Act has been endorsed by the following organizations:

- American Bar Association (ABA)
- ABA Business Law and Litigation Sections
- Certified Financial Planner Board of Standards
- Investment Counsel Association of America (ICAA) (now the Investment Adviser Association (IAA))
- National Association of Securities Dealers (NASD)
- New York Stock Exchange (NYSE)
- North American Securities Administrators Association (NASAA)
- Securities Industry Association (SIA)

== See also ==
- Uniform Securities Agent State Law Examination (Series 63)
- The National Securities Markets Improvement Act of 1996 (NSMIA)
- National Conference of Commissioners on Uniform State Laws (NCCUSL)
