= ACT (Nasdaq) =

ACT, or Automated Confirmation of Transactions, is a system for reporting and clearing trades in the over-the-counter (OTC) and NASDAQ securities markets. Trades compared through ACT are forwarded as locked-in trades to the National Securities Clearing Corporation (NSCC) for settlement; broker-dealers may alternatively clear through Qualified Special Representative (QSR) agreements with the NSCC.

ACT offers a risk management system, approved by the SEC in October 1990, that allows clearing firms to set daily trading thresholds for their correspondent brokers and monitor their activity. This tool is unique within the clearing business.

Since 2006, ACT technology has served as the platform for the Financial Industry Regulatory Authority (FINRA)/Nasdaq Trade Reporting Facility (TRF), a facility of the Financial Industry Regulatory Authority (FINRA) operated by Nasdaq for reporting off-exchange transactions.

== History ==
The National Association of Securities Dealers (NASD) developed ACT as an online trade reporting and comparison system to shorten the comparison cycle for telephone-negotiated trades in Nasdaq securities. A pilot program began on August 30, 1989, with five member firms using the system on test securities; Nasdaq securities were then phased into the pilot alphabetically by ticker symbol, beginning with symbols starting with "A" on November 17, 1989. Participation became mandatory on March 1, 1990, for all self-clearing broker-dealers that were members of a registered clearing agency or had an access relationship with such a member.

On October 26, 1990, the U.S. Securities and Exchange Commission (SEC) approved ACT's risk management functions, which allowed clearing firms to set daily purchase and sale thresholds for their correspondent broker-dealers and to monitor their correspondents' trading activity. In November 1990, ACT also began comparing over-the-counter trades in exchange-listed stocks quoted on the Consolidated Quotation Service.

ACT's reporting obligations expanded during the 1990s. Beginning June 15, 1992, members were required to report broker-to-broker and internalized transactions in regular Nasdaq securities to ACT within 90 seconds of execution. In 1994, the SEC approved rules replacing the manually prepared Form T with electronic reporting through ACT for transactions executed outside normal market hours. In the third quarter of 1998, Nasdaq discontinued the Trade Acceptance and Reconciliation Service (TARS), which had operated since June 1989, and incorporated its reconciliation functionality into ACT.

When Nasdaq began operating as a national securities exchange on August 1, 2006, trade reporting of off-exchange transactions was transferred to the newly created NASD/Nasdaq Trade Reporting Facility (TRF), a limited liability company operated by Nasdaq on the ACT technology platform; it was renamed the FINRA/Nasdaq TRF in 2007 when the NASD became the Financial Industry Regulatory Authority (FINRA). In 2021, Nasdaq re-platformed the ACT Workstation, replacing it with Nasdaq WorkX.

== See also ==
- Securities market
- Stock market data systems
- U.S. Securities and Exchange Commission
- Financial Industry Regulatory Authority
- Electronic communication network
- NASDAQ
