= Vince Shorb =

- Born: Brentwood, California, United States
- Occupation: Financial literacy educator
- Known for: Campaigning for financial literacy

Vince Shorb, is an American educator and campaigner for financial literacy. He founded and is the CEO of the National Financial Educators Council in Huntington Beach, California, United States. A national organization that provides financial literacy resources and is an advocate for financial literacy.

He is also the creator of the Financial EduNation Campaign and the American Dream Movement Student Loan Debt Campaign. He also leads the Financial EduNation statewide financial literacy initiative with Penn State Erie, the Behrend College.

== Career ==
Shorb spent fifteen years in financial services working one-on-one with clients before moving to work on improving financial literacy.

He developed the Money XLive Community Ambassador initiative which recruits celebrities and athletes to teach financial literacy to youth.

In 2014, Shorb was instrumental in developing the NFEC's national financial education standards and the NFEC's College Prep Financial Education Standards.

In 2009 he founded the Money XLive which is a live financial literacy event designed for young adults. At the February 2009 event, Vince and his business partner of Money XLive brought Wilmer Valderrama, John Salley, Christian Hosoi, Brian Sumner, Tyler Christopher, Jessie Billauer and others to perform at the event. This event also had live bands, DJs and dance crews to entertain the audience while teaching financial literacy.

He serves as lead instructor for the Certified Financial Education Instructor training program that served the Office of the Arizona Attorney General for their military financial literacy program.

He led the financial educator training for MidFirst Bank's peer-to-peer financial education at Arizona State University.

He is the Director of the NFEC's Curriculum Advisory Board, which is composed of experts in the personal finance space and is instrumental in coordinating the development of the NFEC's financial literacy curriculum for kids, teens and adults.

He was instrumental in writing the College Student Protection and Financial Education Act.

He was the creator of "The Talk" public service announcement which was featured in TIME Moneyland.

He was an ezine expert author whose programs were featured on The Big Idea with Donny Deutsch, CNN Money, District Administration Magazine, New York Post, CNBC, USA Today, and TIME Moneyland.
