= Series 14 exam =

Exam at the New York Stock Exchange

The Series 14 – NYSE Compliance Official exam is a qualification examination administered to compliance officials at New York Stock Exchange (NYSE) registered broker-dealers. The 110-question test is intended to ensure that individuals designated as having overall day-to-day compliance responsibilities for their firms, or who directly supervise ten or more persons engaged in compliance activity, have the knowledge, skills, and abilities necessary to carry out their job responsibilities.

The Series 14 exam was announced on July 29, 1988 and first administered September 25, 1989. NYSE-member organizations were warned of punishment if they continued operations without a Series 14 qualified compliance official after March 31, 1990.

== Eligibility ==
The Series 14 does not have a prerequisite exam.
