= Financial adviser =

Professional who renders financial services to clients

Financial advisor
Occupation
- Names: Registered representative, financial advisor, investment advisor representative, private banker, attorney, insurance producer, insurance agent, accountant
- Occupation type: Profession
- Activity sectors: Financial services, private banking, banking, business

A financial adviser or financial advisor is a professional who provides financial services to clients based on their financial situation. In many countries, financial advisors must complete specific training and be registered with a regulatory body in order to provide advice.

Relationships between clients and financial advisors can be characterized by principal-agent problems, as financial advisors may possess information and conflicts of interest that lead to dishonest advice and misconduct.

Financial advisors provide a broad range of services that may include investment advice, retirement and estate planning, wealth management, tax‑efficient strategies, insurance solutions, and holistic financial guidance, depending on their licensing, credentials, and scope of practice.

== Role ==
Financial advisers typically provide financial products and services, depending on the qualification examinations they hold and the training they have. Financial advisers are registered, not licensed. For example, a licensed insurance agent may be qualified to sell both life insurance and variable annuities, because the insurance agent holds an insurance license and holds the Series 7 qualification examination. A broker (Series 7) may also be a financial planner. Any advisor can say they are a financial planner; they do not have to hold the CFP (Certified Financial Planner) designation to do so. A financial adviser may create financial plans for clients or sell financial products, or a combination of both. They may also provide insight on savings.

In Canada, the regulatory structure differs significantly. Individuals may hold a life and accident and sickness insurance licence, obtained through the Life Licence Qualification Program (LLQP), which permits the sale of life and health insurance, segregated funds, and annuities. Securities advisors are registered under the Canadian Investment Regulatory Organization (CIRO) and may qualify to sell mutual funds, exchange‑traded funds (ETFs), equities, bonds, or derivatives depending on their registration category and completed courses, such as the Canadian Securities Course (CSC). Many advisors are dual‑licensed, allowing them to offer both insurance and investment products.

Financial planning is a separate professional function. In Ontario and Québec, the titles Financial Planner and Financial Advisor are legally protected and may only be used by individuals who hold approved credentials from recognized credentialing bodies. Common planning designations include CFP, QAFP, PFA, CLU, and RFP. Advisors may create financial plans, provide holistic financial guidance, or combine planning with product distribution depending on their qualifications and regulatory permissions.

== Compensation ==
A financial adviser is generally compensated through fees, commissions, or a combination of both. For example, a financial adviser may be compensated in one or more of the following ways:

- An hourly fee, for advisory or planning services
- A flat fee, such as $3,500 per year, for an annual portfolio review or $5,000 for a financial plan. This is often referred to as "flat fee advisors" or "fee-based advising"
- Asset-based fee, typically a percentage of assets under management (AUM), such as 1% annually of assets managed.
- Mutual fund commissions, including front‑end loads, deferred sales charges (DSCs), or ongoing trailer fees (the latter being common in Canada). This is based on the amount invested in a mutual fund or variable annuity.
- Insurance commissions, including first‑year commissions, renewal commissions, and service fees for life and health insurance products.
- Segregated fund commissions, which apply to insurance‑based investment products.
- A commission on the securities transactions, such as $12 per trade, where permitted, including mark‑ups or mark‑downs on fixed‑income products.
- A mark-up, when one buys house products (such as bonds that the broker holds in inventory), or a mark-down when they are sold.

== Regulation ==
=== United States ===
Advisors typically fall into two separate categories: broker-dealers (BD) who typically earn a commission from sales and registered investment advisers (RIAs) who typically charge a fee based upon assets under management while serving as fiduciaries and are registered at the state or federal level. Additionally, an advisor can be either affiliated with a large firm ("wirehouse") or be independent (e.g., independent broker-dealer or IBD). There are also "hybrid RIAs" who are both broker-dealers and registered.

The number of independent broker-dealer firms has declined from 1175 in 2007 to 819 in 2018, while RIA firms have grown from 9,538 to 15,645 over the same time period. As of 2016, the largest IBD firm by revenue was LPL Financial followed by Ameriprise Financial and Raymond James Financial. Edward Jones is another large broker-dealer, and in 2017 stopped selling commission-based funds in response to a best interest fiduciary rule by the Department of Labor (DOL). As of 2019, Merrill Lynch had not adopted an RIA model while Wells Fargo and Goldman Sachs had opened up to the business model. As of 2019, the largest fee-only RIA firm was Edelman Financial Engines with over $200 billion in assets under management, under the ownership of private equity firm Hellman & Friedman. Other large fee-only RIA firms include Fisher Investments, which has over $120 billion in assets under management. As of 2019, 80% of the $4 trillion managed by RIAs were on one of four platforms: Fidelity Investments, Schwab, and Pershing LLC. Some RIAs operate inside "RIA aggregators" which provide institutional support similar to a wirehouse.

In the United States, the Financial Industry Regulatory Authority (FINRA) regulates and oversees the activities of brokerage firms, and their registered representatives. The Securities and Exchange Commission (SEC) regulates investment advisers and their investment adviser representatives. Insurance companies, insurance agencies and insurance producers are regulated by state authorities. Investment Advisers may be registered with state regulatory agencies, the Securities and Exchange Commission, or pursuant to certain exemptions, remain unregistered.

In the United States, a financial adviser carries a Series 7 and Series 66 or Series 65 qualification examination. According to the U.S. Financial Industry Regulatory Authority (FINRA), qualification designations and compliance issues must be reported for public view. Details of formal compliance issues can be found on the Investment Adviser Public Disclosure (IAPD) website. FINRA specifies the following groups of "investment professionals" who do not necessarily or always represent a "financial adviser:" brokers, investment advisers, private bankers, accountants, lawyers, insurance agents and financial planners. Financial advisors need to be able to take the full picture of the client's financial situation into account.

==== Fiduciary standard ====
The anti-fraud provisions of the Investment Advisers Act of 1940 and most state laws impose a duty on Investment Advisors to act as fiduciaries in dealings with their clients. This means the adviser must hold the client's interest above its own in all matters. The SEC has said that an adviser has a duty to:

- Make reasonable investment recommendations independent of outside influences
- Select broker-dealers based on their ability to provide the best execution of trades for accounts where the adviser has authority to select the broker-dealer.
- Make recommendations based on a reasonable inquiry into a client's investment objectives, financial situation, and other factors
- Always place client interests ahead of its own.

Since the financial crisis in 2008, there has been great debate regarding the fiduciary standard and to which advisers it should apply. In July 2010, The Dodd–Frank Wall Street Reform and Consumer Protection Act mandated increased consumer protection measures, including enhanced disclosures and authorized the SEC to extend the fiduciary duty to include brokers rather than only advisers regulated by the 1940 Act. As of July 2016, the SEC has yet to extend the fiduciary duty to all brokers and advisers regardless of their designation. However, in April 2016, the Department of Labor finalized a thousand-page rule holding all brokers, including independent brokers, working with retirement accounts (IRAs, 401(k)s, etc.) to the fiduciary standard.

In June 2016, as a way to address adviser conflicts of interest, the DOL ruled in a redefinition of what constitutes financial advice, and who is considered a fiduciary. Prior to 2016, fiduciary standards only applied to Registered Investment Advisers (RIAs), and did not impact brokers, who previously operated under a less strict "suitability" standard that provided leeway to provide education without "advice". The new ruling requires all financial advisers who offer advice for compensation to act as fiduciaries and meet the fiduciary standard, but only when dealing with retirement accounts such as IRA or 401(k) accounts. The ruling includes one exemption for brokers, Best Interest Contract Exemption, which can be allowed if the broker enters into a contract with the plan participant and meets certain behavioral requirements. The new ruling does not impact the advice or investment product sales pertaining to non-retirement accounts.

Opposition to the fiduciary standard maintains that the higher standard of fiduciary duty, vs the lower standard of suitability, would be too costly to implement and reduce choice for consumers. Other criticisms suggest that consumers with smaller retirement accounts may be less able to access personalized advice due to advisor/broker compensation models, many of which have been restructured to comply with the fiduciary rule.

The decision has caused a massive shift in the financial community. One survey found that 73% of advisors were concerned the rule would have an adverse impact on how they do business, 71% anticipated increased client frustration, and 66% planned to reevaluate the products they recommend.

Enforcement of the rule began on 9 June 2017 but is no longer enforced since the DOL fiduciary rule was officially vacated on 21 June 2018 by the U.S. Fifth Circuit Court of Appeals. On 5 June 2019, the SEC adopted Regulation Best Interest, establishing a new standard of conduct under the Securities Exchange Act of 1934 ("Exchange Act") for broker-dealers, with compliance due to begin 30 June 2020.

In July 2020, the DOL proposed a new fiduciary rule, and made two changes to guidance and regulation.

==== Registration ====
A registered investment adviser (RIA) refers to an IA that is registered with the SEC or a state's securities agency and typically provides investment advice to a retail investor or registered investment company such as a mutual fund, or exchange-traded fund. Registered Investment Advisors are regulated by either the SEC or by the individual states, depending on the amount of assets under management.

=== Canada ===
In Canada, the spelling "financial advisor" (with an o) is the standard form used by regulators, credentialing bodies, and the financial services industry, including FSRA, CIRO, FP Canada, and major financial institutions.

The financial advisory industry in Canada is regulated through multiple frameworks depending on the products and services an individual is licensed to provide. In Ontario, the titles "Financial Planner" and "Financial Advisor" are legally protected under the Financial Professionals Title Protection Act, administered by the Financial Services Regulatory Authority of Ontario (FSRA). Individuals may use these titles only if they hold an approved credential from an FSRA‑approved credentialing body. Financial advisors may hold insurance licences, securities registrations, financial planning credentials, or a combination of all three.

Insurance‑licensed advisors are regulated at the provincial level. In most provinces, individuals must complete the Life Licence Qualification Program (LLQP) to obtain a life and accident & sickness insurance licence. In Québec, licensing is overseen by the Autorité des marchés financiers (AMF), which administers its own education and examination requirements. Insurance advisors may distribute life and health insurance, segregated funds, annuities, and related products. Many operate through Managing General Agencies (MGAs), which serve as distribution intermediaries rather than regulatory categories.

Securities‑licensed advisors are regulated nationally by the Canadian Investment Regulatory Organization (CIRO), formed in 2023 through the consolidation of the Mutual Fund Dealers Association of Canada (MFDA) and the Investment Industry Regulatory Organization of Canada (IIROC). Registration categories under CIRO determine the types of securities an advisor may offer. Completion of the Canadian Securities Course (CSC) typically qualifies individuals to sell a broad range of securities, including stocks, bonds, mutual funds, and exchange‑traded funds (ETFs). Mutual fund representatives may complete a mutual funds licensing course, which permits the sale of mutual funds but not individual equities or certain specialized products. Additional licensing is required for derivatives, options, and exempt market securities.

Financial planners provide comprehensive financial planning services, including retirement, tax, estate, and risk management planning. In Ontario, the titles "Financial Planner" and "Financial Advisor" are legally protected under the Financial Professionals Title Protection Act, administered by the Financial Services Regulatory Authority of Ontario (FSRA). Individuals may use these titles only if they hold an approved credential from an FSRA‑approved credentialing body. Québec has long regulated the title "Financial Planner," requiring certification through the Institut québécois de planification financière (IQPF) under the oversight of the AMF. Saskatchewan has also adopted title protection legislation for financial planners and advisors.

Common financial planning designations in Canada include the Certified Financial Planner (CFP), Qualified Associate Financial Planner (QAFP), Personal Financial Planner (PFP), Professional Financial Advisor (PFA), Chartered Life Underwriter (CLU), Registered Retirement Consultant (RRC) and Registered Financial Planner (R.F.P.).Many advisors hold multiple designations to expand their scope of practice and provide more holistic advice.

=== United Kingdom ===
There are three main bodies awarding qualifications for financial advisers in the UK. The main one is the Chartered Insurance Institute, which offers professional financial services qualifications all the way from beginner to degree levels. The IFS School of Finance offers alternative courses/qualifications in certain specialist areas such as mortgages and equity release. The Institute of Financial Planning offers the Certified Financial Planner.

In the United Kingdom, investment advice is given either by a financial adviser or a stockbroker.

Financial advisers need to pass a series of exams and receive a Diploma in Financial Planning (or, prior to the Retail Distribution Review, a Financial Planning Certificate) and also authorised by the Financial Conduct Authority, a UK government qango that must be satisfied that the adviser is a "fit and proper person" before they may practice. Typically a diploma qualified adviser will have DipFA or DipPFS after their name.

Financial advisers are either restricted or independent. An independent financial adviser is free to select a suitable solution for the client from all the products and providers in the market. An adviser that is not free to select from the entire market, for whatever reason, is restricted. An adviser may be restricted because they only advise on a specific area, for example pensions, or because they only advise on products from one company such as a bank.

Since the rules resulting from the Retail Distribution Review took effect on 31 December 2012, advisers in the UK must be paid through adviser charges agreed with the client. They may not receive commission from product providers when making personal recommendations on retail investment products.

In the UK there are 30,043 investment advisers, 27,776 mortgage advisers of which 8,788 are holistic advisers providing investment and mortgage advice. Each firm will be granted permissions by the FCA to operate, and each adviser has qualifications that will allow them to give advice on some or all of the permissions the firm has. It is possible to check the regulatory status of a firm, its granted permissions, trading names, and individuals authorised to act on its behalf as financial advisers by using either the regulatory body register or a commercial service that relies on the same data but provides additional functionality such as mapping and location searches such as financialadvisers.co.uk.

Best advice is a concept that was never more than a heading in the FSA/PIA/NASDIM regulations (and is now withdrawn in favour of the 'appropriate' standard) and which refers to the general obligation under Contract Law (Agency) that a broker has to find the correct 'financial product' to match a client 'need'. A provider firm must not make a recommendation unless it has a suitable product to offer. If it offers no suitable products then none should be recommended. A multi-tied firm must not make any recommendations unless it has access to a suitable product from the providers on their panel.

=== Ireland ===
The QFA ("qualified financial advisor") designation is awarded to those who pass the Professional Diploma in Financial Advice and agree to comply with the ongoing "continuous professional development" (CPD) requirements. It is the recognised benchmark designation for financial advisers working in retail financial services. The qualification, and attaching CPD programme, meets the "minimum competency requirements" (MCR) specified by the Financial Regulator, for advising on and selling five categories of retail financial products:

- Savings, investments and pensions
- Housing loans and associated insurances
- Consumer credit and associated insurances
- Shares, bonds and other investment instruments
- Life assurance protection policies

=== New Zealand ===
The National Certificate in Financial Services [Financial Advice] [Level 5] is currently being introduced in New Zealand. All individuals and registered legal entities providing financial services must be registered as a (Registered Financial Service Provider). Their Directors, retail and sales staff are required to gain the national certificate.

The New Zealand Qualifications Authority (NZQA) in conjunction with industry groups via the ETITO administers a qualifications frame work for the qualification. Registrations and examinations are conducted by the ETITO. All financial advisers are required to register with the ETITO by March 31, 2011.

The Qualifications Framework consists of a core set of competencies sets, A B C followed by 2 electives covering specialist areas such as Insurance and Residential Property Lending. Certain NZQA approved qualifications such as an Accountancy degree may exempt students from competency set A NZQA approved training. The certificate is offered by the accredited organizations.

=== South Korea ===
In South Korea, the Korea Financial Investment Association oversees the licensing of investment advisers.

=== Australia ===
Financial advisors in Australia must have passed a RG146 qualifying and hold a license that is overseen by the Australian Securities and Investments Commission. It ought to be noted that financial advisers in Australia will need to undergo transitional arrangements as new educational requirements will be in place on 1 January 2019. Additionally, financial advisers in Australia are subject to fiduciary obligations.

=== India ===
The Securities and Exchange Board of India (SEBI) is the regulator for the securities market in India.

It was established in 1988 and given statutory powers on 12 April 1992 through the SEBI Act, 1992. In India, SEBI registered investment advisor is referred, when an investor who would like advice on where to invest in share market or an investor. SEBI has put certain guidelines before giving RIA license to any individual, corporate or firms. In India, there are 1160 RIAs as of 31 January 2020, who are registered with SEBI as registered investment advisor (2013) regulations.

== See also ==
- Certified Financial Education Instructor
- Collective investment schemes
- Socially responsible investing
- Robo-advisor
