= Joe Borg (screenwriter) =

Maltese-English screenwriter and director

- Born: Joseph Borg; 1986 (age 39–40); Malta
- Occupation: Screenwriter
- Known for: Winner: Best Narrative Feature 2015 at the American Movie Awards
- Notable work: What Not to Forget, The Stalker Cycle

Joe Borg (born 1986) is a Maltese-English screenwriter and director known for his feature scripts What Not To Forget, and comedy The Stalker Cycle, which won the 2015 Best Narrative Feature of the American Movie Awards. His drama script What Not To Forget was named a semi-finalist in the 2016 BlueCat Screenplay Competition.
