= South African Qualifications Authority =

Statutory body to oversee the national qualifications framework

- Formation: 1995; 31 years ago
- Type: Statutory body
- Headquarters: Pretoria, South Africa
- Region served: South Africa
- Key people: Nadia Starr (CEO)
- Website: saqa.org.za

The South African Qualifications Authority (SAQA) is a statutory body, regulated in terms of the National Qualifications Framework Act No. 67 of 2008. It is made up of 29 members appointed by the Minister of Education in consultation with the Minister of Labour. SAQA is mandated by legislation to oversee the development and implementation of the National Qualifications Framework (NQF).

== The National Qualifications Framework ==
The NQF is a framework, i.e. it sets the boundaries, principle and guidelines, which provide a vision, a philosophical base and an organisational structure, for the construction of a qualifications system. Detailed development and implementation is carried out within these boundaries. All education and training in South Africa fits within this framework.

It is national because it is a national resource, representing a national effort at integrating education and training into unified structure of recognised qualifications. It is framework of qualifications i.e. records of learner achievements.

The NQF is a set of principles and guidelines by which records of learner achievement are registered to enable national recognition of acquired skills and knowledge, thereby ensuring an integrated system that encourages lifelong learning.

The NQF consist of 10 levels divided into three bands; Levels 1 to 4 equate to high school grades 9 to 12 or vocational training, 5 to 7 are college diplomas and technical qualifications, 7 to 10 are university degrees.

Levels	Designation
1	Grade 9
2	Grade 10 and National (vocational) Certificates level 2
3	Grade 11 and National (vocational) Certificates level 3
4	Grade 12 (National Senior Certificate) and National (vocational) Cert. level 4
5	Higher Certificates and Advanced National (vocational) Cert.
6	National Diploma and Advanced certificates
7	Bachelor's degree, Advanced Diplomas, Post Graduate Certificate and B-tech
8	Honours degree, Post Graduate diploma and Professional Qualifications
9	Master's degree
10	Doctor's degree

A graph mapping out the National Qualification Frameworks (NQF) and how they relate to different educational options within the South African educational system in 2017

== History ==
In October 1995, the South African Qualifications Authority Act (No. 58 of 1995) was promulgated to establish the authority, whose main task was to establish the National Qualifications Framework (NQF). The authority started operations in May 1996.

By 2001 the NQF was under review, and after that the 1995 SAQA law was replaced by the National Qualifications Framework Act (No. 67 of 2008). The authority remained in place and so did the updated NQF.

== Functions ==
The functions of SAQA are essentially twofold :

- to oversee the development of the NQF by formulating and publishing policies and criteria for registration of bodies responsible for establishing education and training standards or qualifications and for accreditation of bodies responsible for monitoring and auditing achievements in terms of such standards and qualifications
- to oversee the implementation of the NQF by ensuring the registration, accreditation and assignment of functions to bodies referred to above, as well as the registration of national standards and qualifications on the framework. It must also take steps to ensure that provisions for accreditations are complied with and where appropriate, that registered standards and qualifications are internationally comparable.

== Activities ==
To realise this objective, SAQA has established and maintains the following:

- a system for setting nationally recognised and internationally comparable education and training standards and qualifications from NQF Level 1 (Grade 9 or Adult Basic Education and Training Level 4 – the exit point from General Education and Training) to NQF Level 8 (post-graduate qualifications)
- a national quality assurance system to ensure that education and training is delivered to the set standards
- an electronic management information system which records all relevant information on the achievements of South African learners (the National Learners’ Records Database).

SAQA also has the task of evaluating foreign educational qualifications to determine their South African equivalence. People with foreign qualifications who wish to attend South African education institutions or who wish to enter the South African labour market apply to SAQA to have their qualifications evaluated.
