= RG146 =

Regulatory Guide 146 (RG 146) on Training of financial product advisers, formerly known as policy statement 146 (PS 146) is an Australian financial regulation issued by the Australian Securities & Investments Commission (ASIC) related to the minimum training required by individuals selling financial products. When used in the context of describing an individual it means that such an individual has completed relevant training and passed an exam recognised as meeting RG 146 criteria and is then able to provide advice on financial products to the general public in Australia.

All individuals must meet the RG 146 requirements before they can sell financial products in Australia to the general public, this includes up-to-date ongoing training through a continuous professional development (CPD) program.

== History ==
Policy Statement 146 (PS146) was introduced under the Financial Services Reform Act 2001 (FSR Act). It prescribes adequate levels of training, competence, and experience for those seen to be giving financial product advice to retail investors. It was part of ASIC's aim to protect so called 'mum & dad' investors. The designation was changed to RG146 by ASIC on 5 July 2007.

== Structure ==
Under RG 146, an adviser can be categorised in one of two ways, providing General financial advice or providing Personal financial advice. General financial advice is categorised as Tier 2, and Personal financial advice is categorised as Tier 1.

If an adviser is considering an investors personal financial position (i.e. he/she is aware of the investors personal financial position, personal financial aims and needs, and is recommending a product) when recommending a financial product, then that is Tier 1 advice. However, if an adviser is simply talking about the benefits of a product without any personal reference to any client (i.e. he/she may be marketing a new financial product through the media, or a presentation to a group of different investors) then this is categorised as Tier 2 advice.

Generally (there are some exceptions to this rule) a Tier 2 adviser will be in a position to sell large quantities of a financial product downstream to Tier 1 advisers. The Tier 1 advisers will then on-sell the product in smaller quantities to his/her clients who he/she believes would have the most to gain from this particular product. For this reason investment banks generally concentrate on having a retail sales team for financial products consisting exclusively of Tier 2 advisers. By doing so, they reduce the number of transactions (because each transaction is of greater worth) and sell their product down-stream much faster.

Tier 1 compliance is harder to gain than Tier 2 as it takes into account individual's positions (which by their nature are diverse). Tier 1 requires two examinations, while Tier 2 requires one examination.

Tier 1 advice is divided into a number of categories that focus on a specific segment of the financial market, for example: Managed Investments (see collective investment scheme), securities, derivatives, life insurance, and superannuation. An adviser can either choose to study these individually or in succession as part of the Diploma of Financial Services (Financial Planning). Whichever the adviser chooses to do they must ensure that they are RG 146 compliant for the knowledge area they specialise in.

There are many providers of RG146 compliance training in Australia but these have to be registered with ASIC and meet specific criteria.

== See also ==
- Financial planner
- Certified Financial Planner
