= North American Securities Administrators Association =

American investor protection entity

The North American Securities Administrators Association (NASAA), founded in Kansas in 1919, is the oldest international investor protection organization and is one of many self-regulatory organizations. NASAA is an association of state securities administrators who are charged with the responsibility to protect consumers who purchase securities or investment advice. NASAA's membership consists of 67 administrators from the territories, districts, and states of the United States, from Mexico, and from the provinces of Canada.

In the United States, NASAA is the voice of state securities agencies responsible for efficient capital formation and grassroots investor protection. NASAA's fundamental mission is protecting consumers who purchase securities or investment advice, and its jurisdiction extends to a wide variety of issuers and intermediaries who offer and sell securities to the public.

Through the association, NASAA members participate in multi-state enforcement actions and information sharing. NASAA also coordinates and implements training programs and education seminars for state, district, provincial, and territorial securities agency staff.

Representative of the nature of its activities are its frequent warnings regarding investment fraud, its focus on the tax advantages of college plans, and its involvement in naked short selling litigation aimed at the Depository Trust & Clearing Corporation.

NASAA also provides a coordinated review process for companies using Regulation A of the Securities Act of 1933 to raise capital.

== Exams ==
There are three exams written by NASAA, all of which are currently administered by FINRA.

- Uniform Securities Agent State Law Exam (Series 63)
- Uniform Investment Adviser Law Exam (Series 65)
- Uniform Combined State Law Exam (Series 66)

None of these exams require sponsorship from a firm; however, the Series 66 requires the Series 7 as a co-requisite.

== Presidents ==
2022: Senter Lubin, Maryland

2021: Lisa Hopkins, West Virginia

2020: Christopher W. Gerold, New Jersey

2019: Michael Pieciak, Vermont

2018: Joseph Borg, Alabama

2017: Mike Rothman, Minnesota

2016: Judy Shaw, Maine

2015: Bill Beatty, Washington

2014: Andrea Seidt, Ohio

2013: A. Heath Abshure, Arkansas

2012: Jack E. Herstein, Nebraska

2011: David S. Massey, North Carolina

2010:Denise Voigt Crawford, Texas

2009: Fred Joseph, Colorado

2008: Karen Tyler, North Dakota

2007: Joseph Borg, Alabama

2006: Patricia D. Struck, Wisconsin

2005: Franklin L. Widmann, New Jersey

2004: Ralph A. Lambiase, Connecticut

2003:Christine A. Bruenn, Maine

2002: Joseph Borg, Alabama

2001:Deborah R. Bortner, Washington

2000: Bradley W. Skolnik, Indiana

1999: Peter C. Hildreth, New Hampshire

1998: Denise Voigt Crawford, Texas

1997: Mark J. Griffin, Utah

1996: Dee Riddell Harris, Arizona

1995: Philip A. Feigin, Colorado

1994: Craig A. Goettsch, Iowa

1993: Barry Guthary, Massachusetts

1992: Lewis W. Brothers, Jr., Virginia

1991: Doug Mays, Kansas & John R. Perkins, Missouri

1990: Susan E. Bryant, Oklahoma

1989: John C. Baldwin, Utah

1988: James C. Meyer, Tennessee

1987: F. Daniel Bell, III, North Carolina

1986: Royce O. Griffin, Colorado

1985: H. Wayne Howell, Georgia

1984: Michael Unger, Massachusetts

1983: Richard D. Latham, Texas

1982: David Hart Wunder, Illinois

1981: Thomas L. Krebs, Alabama

For presidents prior to 1981, See Official website (below).

== See also ==
- Uniform Securities Act
