= Uniform Securities Agent State Law Exam =

The Uniform Securities Agent State Law Examination, commonly referred to as the Series 63, is developed by North American Securities Administrators Association (NASAA) and is administered by the Financial Industry Regulatory Authority (FINRA). The examination is designed to qualify candidates as securities agents in the United States; nearly all states require individuals to pass the Series 63 as a condition of state registration.

The Uniform Securities Agent State Law Examination consists of 65 multiple-choice questions. Applicants are allowed 75 minutes to complete the examination. Applicants must attain scores of 72% in order to pass. Credit is only given for correct answers. Of the 65 questions on the exam, 60 will count toward the final score. The remaining 5 questions are being pre-tested for possible inclusion in the operational question bank; these questions may appear anywhere in the exam and are not identified.

The examination covers the principles of state securities regulation reflected in the Uniform Securities Act (with the amendments adopted by NASAA and rules prohibiting dishonest and unethical business practices). The examination is intended to provide a basis for state securities administrators to determine an applicant's knowledge and understanding of state law and regulations.

Test Breakdown	# of Questions	% of Exam
Registration of Persons	24	40%
Securities	6	10%
Business Practice	24	40%
Administrative Provisions & Other Remedies	6	10%

Test Breakdown	# of Questions	% of Exam
State & Federal Securities Acts and related rules & regulations	36	60%
Ethical practices & fiduciary obligations	24	40%

== See also ==
- List of Securities Examinations
- Series 6
- General Securities Representative Exam (Series 7)
- Series 65
- Financial Industry Regulatory Authority (FINRA)
- Uniform Securities Act
