= Investments and Wealth Institute =

The Investments and Wealth Institute (IWI), previously known as Investment Management Consultants Association (IMCA), was founded in 1985 in Colorado to provide investment consulting and wealth management credentials and educational offerings for its members. IMCA is both a certification organization and a membership association.

== Membership ==
IWI members work in all areas of the financial services industry. Approximately half serve at major national and regional brokerage firms; about a quarter of IWI members work independently. In 2011, IWI reported that membership had grown to 8,400. By 2013, IWI membership topped 9,000—a 7 percent increase over the previous year.

In September 2013, Tim Whiting was hired as national sales director. Whiting served as group publisher at SourceMedia from 2006 until 2013.

== Conferences ==
IWI hosts Best of IWI regional seminars around the country and four to five major conferences each year A New York Consultants Conference is held annually in January or February, and IWI’s Annual Conference is held each spring. This conference is the largest association gathering of investment advisors and private wealth management professionals in the country.

== Certifications ==
=== Certified Investment Management Analyst (CIMA) ===
Since 1988, IWI has offered the Certified Investment Management Analyst certification to experienced financial consultants who have successfully completed the educational program and met other certification requirements, including examination. CIMA professionals provide investment advice and guidance to both individuals and institutions.

In April 2011, CIMA certification earned accreditation by the American National Standards Institute, making it the only financial services designation in the United States accredited under an international personnel certification standard (ISO 17024).

To earn CIMA certification, applicants must demonstrate at least three years of financial industry experience, complete a registered education course, and pass a background check and certification exam. Candidates choosing the traditional in-class education model attend a week-long executive education program at qualifying institutions including: The University of Chicago Booth School of Business or The Wharton School of the University of Pennsylvania. Candidates choosing an online education model enroll in the program at The Yale School of Management

==== FINRA Series 65 or Series 66 Exam Waiver for CIMA® Certified ====
Investments & Wealth Institute, the leading credentialing body for financial advisors and wealth management professionals, has announced that the Institute’s Certified Investment Management Analyst® (CIMA®) certification has been recognized by the North American Securities Administrators Association (NASAA) as a designation eligible for waiver from the FINRA Series 65 or 66 exams.

=== Certified Private Wealth Advisor (CPWA) ===
IWI also offers the Certified Private Wealth Advisor credential designed for advisors and wealth managers who specialize in counseling high-net-worth clients. The curriculum immerses professionals into issues dealing with estate and tax planning, executive compensation, stock options, charitable planning and more. The certification reinforces advanced expertise in the life cycle of wealth: accumulating, preserving and protecting, and distributing.

The registered education provider for the traditional in-class program for CPWA certification is The University of Chicago Booth School of Business. The registered education provider for the online program for CPWA certification is The Yale School of Management.
