= Series 7 exam =

American standardized test for entry-level stockbrokers

In the United States, the Series 7 exam, also known as the General Securities Representative Exam (GSRE), is a test for entry-level registered representatives, that demonstrates competency to buy or sell security products such as corporate securities, municipal securities, options, direct participation programs, investment company products, and variable contracts. The Series 7 is administered by the Financial Industry Regulatory Authority (FINRA), an industry regulatory agency.

The Series 7 exam ensures a baseline level of proficiency for individuals starting their careers in the financial industry. It is particularly important for newly hired personnel who may lack prior exposure to finance-related subjects during their university education. Passing the Series 7 exam is often a requirement for other FINRA exams, including those related to options trading and managerial roles.

== Permitted activities ==
A candidate who passes the Series 7 exam is qualified for the solicitation, purchase and/or sale of all securities products, including corporate securities, municipal fund securities, options, direct participation programs, investment company products and variable contracts.

Covered activities and products include:

- public offerings and/or private placements of corporate securities (stocks and bonds),
- rights,
- warrants,
- mutual funds,
- money market funds,
- unit investment trusts (UITs),
- exchange-traded funds (ETFs),
- real estate investment trusts (REITs),
- options, options strategies and mortgage-backed securities,
- government securities,
- repos and certificates of accrual on government securities,
- direct participation programs,
- venture capital,
- sale of municipal securities and
- hedge funds

== Eligibility ==
The corequisite is the Securities Industry Essentials (SIE) exam, a change FINRA enacted in 2018. In October 2018, the 250-question Series 7 exam was replaced by the current top-off exam that is now taken in conjunction with the SIE exam (a correlative change was made to the Series 6 exam). In order to take the exam, an individual must be sponsored by a member firm of either FINRA or a self-regulatory organization (SRO). Employers will sponsor candidates as part of employment.

There is no education requirement.

== Structure ==
The Series 7 is a three-hour, forty-five-minute exam. It is held in one four-hour session. There are 125 questions on the test. Candidates have to score at least 72% to pass. The SIE Exam and the Series 7 Exam are co-requisite exams.

Average study time is between 80 and 150 hours depending on current financial knowledge.

The Series 7 exam tests candidates on four functions.

Test Breakdown by Function	Number of Questions	Percentage of Test Questions
(F1) Seeks Business for the Broker-Dealer through Customers and Potential Customers	9	7%
(F2) Opens Accounts after Obtaining and Evaluating Customers’ Financial Profile and Investment Objectives	11	9%
(F3) Provides Customers with Information about Investments, Makes Suitable Recommendations, Transfers Assets and Maintains Appropriate Records	91	73%
(F4) Obtains and Verifies Customers’ Purchase and Sales Instructions and Agreements; Processes, Completes, and Confirms Transactions	14	11%
TOTAL	125	100%

== Registration costs ==
As of June 24, 2023, the registration cost is $300.

== See also ==
- List of securities examinations
- Series 6 exam
- Uniform Securities Agent State Law Exam (Series 63)
- General Securities Principal Exam (Series 24)
- U.S. Securities and Exchange Commission
