= Financial Industry Regulatory Authority =

American financial self-regulatory organization

Financial Industry Regulatory Authority, Inc.
- Predecessor: National Association of Securities Dealers (1939–2007)
- Founded: July 30, 2007; 19 years ago
- Headquarters: Washington, D.C., US
- Key people: Robert W. Cook (President and CEO); Eric Noll (Chairperson)
- Budget: US$1.5 billion (2025)
- Employees: 4,382 (2025)
- Website: www.finra.org

The Financial Industry Regulatory Authority, Inc. (FINRA) is a private, non-governmental American corporation that acts as a self-regulatory organization (SRO) that regulates member brokerage firms and exchange markets. FINRA is the successor to the National Association of Securities Dealers, Inc. (NASD) as well as to the member regulation, enforcement, and arbitration operations of the New York Stock Exchange.

The United States Securities and Exchange Commission (SEC) is the federal government agency that serves as the ultimate regulator of the United States securities industry, including oversight of FINRA.

== Overview ==
The Financial Industry Regulatory Authority is the largest independent regulator for all securities firms doing business in the United States. FINRA's mission is to protect investors by making sure the United States securities industry operates fairly and honestly. As of March 2026, FINRA oversees over 3,250 brokerage firms and 625,000 registered securities representatives.

FINRA has approximately 4,200 employees and operates from Washington, D.C., and New York City, with 20 regional offices around the United States.

FINRA offers regulatory oversight over all securities firms that do business with the public, plus those offering professional training, testing, and licensing of registered persons, arbitration and mediation, market regulation by contract for the New York Stock Exchange, the NASDAQ Stock Market, Inc., the American Stock Exchange LLC, and the International Securities Exchange, LLC; and industry utilities, such as Trade Reporting Facilities and other over-the-counter operations.

FINRA was formed by a consolidation of the member regulation, enforcement, and arbitration operations of the New York Stock Exchange, NYSE Regulation, Inc., and NASD. The merger was approved by the Securities and Exchange Commission on July 26, 2007.

FINRA's authority was upheld in June 2025, when the United States Supreme Court declined to hear an argument that the regulator is unconstitutional. The case was raised after FINRA made a 2019 judgement against a broker-dealer for alleged theft of client funds, and the appeals process resulted in the denial from the high court and upholding of FINRA's regulatory authority.

Congresswoman and Republican Conference Chair Lisa McClain introduced legislation in April 2025 to transfer the rulemaking, examination, and enforcement authority held by FINRA to the SEC. McClain's bill was the subject of a House Subcommittee on Capital Markets hearing in March 2026; the abolition of FINRA's regulatory authority is one of the aims of Project 2025.

== History ==
The NASD was founded on September 3, 1936, as Investment Bankers Conference, Inc. and, on August 7, 1939, was registered under the name National Association of Securities Dealers, Inc. as a national securities association with the SEC under authority granted by the 1938 Maloney Act amendments to the Securities Exchange Act of 1934, which allowed it to supervise the conduct of its members subject to the oversight of the SEC. In 1971, NASD launched a new computerized stock trading system called the National Association of Securities Dealers Automated Quotations (NASDAQ) stock market. The NASDAQ and American Stock Exchange (AMEX) stock exchanges merged in 1998. Two years later, the NASDAQ underwent a major recapitalization and became an independent entity from NASD. In July 2007, the SEC approved the formation of a new SRO to be a successor to NASD. The NASD and the member regulation, enforcement and arbitration functions of the New York Stock Exchange were then consolidated into the Financial Industry Regulatory Authority (FINRA).

== Board of governors ==
FINRA's Board comprises 22 industry and public members, with 10 seats designated for industry members, 11 seats designated for public members and one seat reserved for FINRA's Chief Executive Officer. The FINRA By-Laws provide that the number of public governors shall exceed the number of Industry governors. The small firm governors, mid-size firm governor, and large-firm governors are elected by members of FINRA according to their classification as a small firm, mid-size firm, or large firm.

== Regulation and licensure functions ==
FINRA regulates trading in equities, corporate bonds, securities futures, and options. All firms dealing in securities that are not regulated by another SRO, such as by the Municipal Securities Rulemaking Board (MSRB), are required to be member firms of FINRA.

As part of its regulatory authority, FINRA periodically conducts regulatory exams of its regulated institutions. FINRA publishes an annual report detailing its observations from the prior year's examinations in order to provide member firms with insight into findings from the recent oversight activities of FINRA's Member Supervision, Market Regulation and Enforcement programs. Topics covered in the 2023 report include manipulative trading, fair pricing of fixed income, fractional shares, Regulation SHO, financial crimes, cybersecurity, complex products, Regulation Best Interest (Reg BI) and Form CRS, and mobile apps.

NASD, the predecessor of FINRA, founded the NASDAQ (National Association of Securities Dealers Automated Quotations) stock market in 1971. In 2006, NASD demutualized from NASDAQ by selling its ownership interest.

The NASD, and later FINRA, publishes much educational information for the public and has been publishing and disclosing the education and exam requirements for US-based credentials, charters, designations and certifications that are offered by SROs for about a decade. In 2003, FINRA established an Investor Education Foundation focused on providing underserved Americans with financial decision-making tools and education, as well as funding research into financial education and protection for American households.

== BrokerCheck ==
FINRA publishes the background and experience of all licensed financial brokers, advisors and firms for free through the BrokerCheck website. The BrokerCheck Report for an individual contains:

- A summary section that provides a brief overview of the investment professional and credentials.
- The individual's employment history for the last 10 years, including a list of registered securities firms where the individual is or was registered
- A qualifications section that includes a listing of the individual's current registrations or licenses, if any, and industry exams they have passed.
- A disclosure section that includes information about customer disputes, disciplinary events and certain criminal and financial matters on the individual's record
- The individual's most recently submitted comment(s)

The BrokerCheck report for a brokerage firm contains

- A summary section that provides a brief overview of the firm and its background.
- A firm profile that describes where and when the firm was established and lists the people and organizations that own controlling shares or directly influence the firm's daily operations.
- A firm history that details any mergers, acquisitions or name changes affecting the firm.
- A firm operations section that lists the firm's active licenses and registrations, the types of businesses it conducts and other details pertaining to its operations.
- A disclosures section that contains information about any arbitration awards, disciplinary events and financial matters on the firm's record. Some of these items may involve pending actions or allegations that have not been resolved or proven.

After 10 years, an individual will only remain in BrokerCheck system if they were:

- The subject of a final regulatory action
- Convicted of or pled guilty or no contest to certain crimes
- Subject to a civil injunction involving investment-related activity or found in a civil court to have been involved in a violation of investment-related statutes or regulations
- Named as a respondent or defendant in an arbitration or civil litigation in which the investment professional was alleged to have committed a sales practice violation, and which resulted in an award or civil judgment against the investment professional

Academic researchers, journalists and politicians rely on FINRA BrokerCheck data to document misconduct in the US financial industry. A 2016 research paper from the University of Chicago and the University of Minnesota found that 7% of advisors industry-wide had been disciplined for misconduct. In 2017, Reuters analyzed FINRA data and found that a significant percentage of brokers with multiple disclosures on their record worked at only 48 firms. While FINRA does not publicly identify or name individual firms as being "high-risk", they do have an internal unit dedicated to tracking high-risk firms. According to studies in the Journal of Financial Economics and from the University of California, Berkeley, FINRA approves 84% of requests for expungement of BrokerCheck disclosures. In 2019, Senator Elizabeth Warren called for FINRA to be more stringent about granting expungement requests for misconduct, stating, "The study suggests that FINRA's current method of assessing expungement requests-which approves the vast majority of expungement requests-is failing to safeguard information needed for investor protection." In response, FINRA amended its rules in 2023 to make the process more stringent for brokers seeking expungement. The new rules require that expungement cases be decided unanimously by a three-member panel of public arbitrators with "enhanced expungement training" rather than the current sole arbitrator option. It also requires brokers to file straight-in requests within two years of the closing of a customer arbitration or civil litigation and requires earlier notification of customers and state regulators when brokers seek expungement while allowing state regulators to participate in straight-in requests.

== Central Registration Depository ==
On behalf of state securities regulators, FINRA maintains the Central Registration Depository (CRD), the central database containing records for all firms and individuals registered in the securities industry of the United States.

== Size and scale ==
FINRA had total revenues of US$1.34 billion in 2022. FINRA is funded primarily by assessments of member firms' registered representatives and applicants, annual fees paid by members, and by fines that it levies. The annual fee that each member pays includes a basic membership fee, an assessment based on gross income, a fee for each principal and registered representative, and charge for each branch office.

FINRA issued $48.1 million in fines in 2022, down from $90.1 million in 2021, though the 2021 number was fueled by a record fine against Robinhood for $57 million.

== Arbitration ==
FINRA operates the largest arbitration forum in the United States for the resolution of disputes between customers and member firms, as well as between brokerage firm employees and their firms. This function had been performed by both NASD and NYSE's regulation committee until their merger in 2007 to form FINRA. Each entity had its own set of rules on arbitration procedures. After its creation, FINRA Dispute Resolution harmonized the prior NYSE and NASD rules.) Virtually all agreements between investors and their stockbrokers include mandatory arbitration agreements, whereby investors (and the brokerage firms) waive their right to trial in a court of law. While arbitration cases are the usual resolution procedure of last resort, class action cases are brought and often permitted to go forward in courts, where binding arbitration contracts are sometimes rejected, typically after being ruled unconscionable for inflicting high up-front financial costs on consumers. Although the fairness of such mandatory arbitration clauses has been called into question, the United States Supreme Court has generally upheld both the enforceability and result of these arbitrations, including those that limit the availability of class actions. However, FINRA rules do not allow member firms to limit customers' right to pursue class actions in court, rather than arbitration.

As of 2026, the pool of arbitrators consisted of 4,031 individuals classified by FINRA as public and 4,045 classified as non-public.

In 1987, the US Supreme Court ruled in Shearson/American Express Inc. v. McMahon that clauses mandating arbitration for disputes under the Securities Exchange Act of 1934 were enforceable. Three years later, it overturned Wilko v. Swan in Rodriguez de Quijas v. Shearson/American Express Inc., extending the arbitration requirement to disputes under the Securities Act of 1933. Thus, many securities disputes are now resolved in arbitration.

For disputes over US$100,000 between customers and member firms, the panel that decides the case generally consists of three arbitrators: one industry (or, at the customer's timely discretion, non-industry) panelist, one non-industry panelist, and one non-industry chairperson, according to the Code of Arbitration Procedure for Customer Disputes. For disputes between an employee and member firms, all three arbitrators are industry panelists, according to the code. For a given case, the two sides are provided separate lists by FINRA of ten local arbitrators for each category from which each party can strike up to four arbitrators and provide a ranking for the rest. Also provided are ten-year biographies and prior award histories for each arbitrator. FINRA will then provide the parties with the panel members by selecting the highest ranked available arbitrator from each category. Smaller claims are decided by one arbitrator and the smallest—claims of up to $50,000—may be decided through a Simplified Arbitration Process, with the arbitrator deciding the case by reviewing all the materials presented by the parties without an in-person hearing.

According to FINRA, as of February 2026, there were 2,867 new cases filed for arbitration. 240 customer claimant cases had been decided in 2025 and in 28% of those cases, customers were awarded damages. FINRA rates any positive award to a customer as a win for the customer, regardless of the magnitude of losses or legal fees.

FINRA rules do not require parties to be represented by attorneys. A party may also appear pro se, or be represented by a non-attorney in arbitration. The third option is not advised, however, since this may be the unauthorized practice of law. Brokerage firms routinely hire attorneys, so a customer who does not can be at a serious disadvantage.

In June 2006, attorney Lewis D. Lowenfels said of the NASD arbitration process: "What started out as a relatively swift and economical process for a public customer claimant to seek justice has evolved into a costly extended adversarial proceeding dominated by trial lawyers and the usual litigation tactics."

Amidst speculation that Congress was contemplating legislation preventing mandatory arbitration clauses, FINRA announced in July 2008 that it would be launching a pilot program to evaluate all-public arbitration panels (thus not requiring an industry arbitrator to be on each panel). In February 2011, FINRA announced that it would be making the program permanent. In that announcement, Richard Ketchum, then-FINRA Chairman and chief executive officer stated, "We believe that giving investors the ability to have an all-public panel will increase public confidence in the fairness of our dispute resolution process." There are those, however, who see valid reasons for including an industry arbitrator on each panel. According to Richard Jackson, a principal at the advisor firm of Schlindwein Associates, LLC "It's probably pretty important to have someone on the panel who has specific industry knowledge and past experience in that field to explain some of the complexities that may be at issue,"

== See also ==
- List of Securities Examinations
- ACT (Automated Confirmation of Transactions)
- Alternative display facility
- American Academy of Financial Management
- Municipal Securities Rulemaking Board (MSRB)
- Securities Investor Protection Corporation (SIPC)
- Securities market participants in the United States
- Securities regulation in the United States
