= Chartered Administrator =

Professional title in Quebec, Canada

A Chartered Administrator (French: Administrateur agréé) is a member of the Ordre des Administrateurs Agréés du Québec who may use the abbreviation "Adm.A." in French or "C.Adm." in English.

The title Adm.A. or C.Adm. turns out to be a reserved regulated profession; it has no reserved activities. These management professionals are supervised by the Quebec professional system.

In Canada (outside Quebec), there is no equivalent professional title in management sciences.

== Profession Adm.A. ==
Under article 37i of the Quebec Professional Code, Adm.A. may exercise the following professional activities: participate in the establishment, management, and management of public bodies or enterprises, determine or remake their structures, as well as coordinate and control their production or distribution methods and their economic or financial policies and provide advisory services in these matters.

Adm.A. can also use the titles:

- C.M.C. (Certified management consultant or Conseiller en management certifié), if they have qualified with CMC-Canada, through the Ordre des Administrateurs Agréés du Québec;
- Pl.Fin. (Planificateur financier) or F.Pl. (Financial planner) in English, if they have obtained the diploma of "financial planner" from the Institut québécois de planification financière (IQPF) and if they are eligible for supervision by the OAAQ according to the criteria the Financial Products and Services Distribution Act (LDPSF) which is administered by the Autorité des Marchés Financiers (AMF).

The OAAQ also administers the title of "Financial Planner" (Pl.Fin.) for its members who bear it, within the framework of an agreement between the OAAQ and the AMF (Autorité des marchés financiers).

== History of the Adm.A title ==
- As early as 1954, the foundation of the "Corporation des Administrateurs Professionnels / The Corporation of Professional Administrators", these professionals used the designation ""Administrateur Professionnel" (Adm.P.) /"Professional Administrator"(P.Adm.)."
- In 1973, under the new law governing the Quebec professional system, these professionals were designated "Administrateur agréé" (Adm.A.) in French or "Chartered Administrators" (C.Adm.), in English.

== See also ==
- Office des professions du Québec (OPQ)
- Conseil Interprofessionnel du Québec (CIQ)
- Professional Code of Quebec
- Ordre des Administrateurs Agréés du Québec (OAAQ)

== Notes and references ==
=== External links ===
- "Chartered administrators". Official website of the Ordre des Administrateurs agréés du Québec (in French).
- CMC-Canada
