= Bureau des services financiers (Quebec) =

Bureau des services financiers (Québec)
Agency overview
- Formed: 1998
- Dissolved: February 1, 2004
- Jurisdiction: Canadian province of Quebec
- Headquarters: Quebec, Canada
- Agency executive: President and CEO, Louise Champoux-Paillé

The Bureau des services financiers (BSF) was an organization in the Canadian province of Quebec responsible for the distribution of financial products and services covering the various disciplines defined by the "Act on the distribution of financial products and services": Insurance of persons, group insurance of persons, damage insurance, claims adjudication, financial planning, mutual fund brokerage, brokerage in investment contracts and brokerage in stock exchange plans studies. The BSF was in operation from 1998 to 2004, when its mission was absorbed under the Autorité des marchés financiers (Quebec).

== Mission ==
The BSF ensured the protection of the public through the application of the provisions of the Act and its regulations to which certificate holders, firms, representatives and independent corporations, insurers and distributors are subject, and the framework of distribution without a representative. To do so, the BSF was responsible for developing a large part of the regulations, with the exception of the codes of ethics, continuing education and professional titles enacted, as the case may be, by the Chambre de la sécurité financière (Québec) (CSF), the Chambre de l'assurance de dommages (Québec) (Property Insurance Board) (CAD) or the Institut québécois de planification financière (IQPF), and part of the regulations applicable to securities representatives, which are enacted by the Commission des valeurs mobilières du Québec (Quebec Securities Commission) (CVMQ).

The BSF issued practice fees through the certification of representatives and the registration of law firms, independent representatives and independent companies. In particular, it ensured that the conditions for eligibility for the certificate (minimum training, examinations, training periods) were met. It inspected and controlled the activities of registrants, imposing sanctions when necessary, and regulated distribution without a representative, including approving distribution guides for consumers.

In addition, the BSF was responsible for the Information and Referral Center, which provided consumers and industry with answers to their questions and, where appropriate, an accompaniment and support service for any approach to the distribution of financial products and services. This information center was also the focal point for receiving complaints.

The "Bureau des services financiers" was in constant contact with a number of partner organizations, each of which had a role to play in consumer protection: the Chambre de l'assurance de dommages (Québec), Chambre de la sécurité financière (Québec), the Commission des valeurs mobilières du Québec, the "Financial Services Compensation Fund", the "Inspector General of Financial Institutions", and the Institut québécois de planification financière (IQPF).

The BSF therefore proposed a single reference framework bringing together all the players in the distribution of financial products and services under its direction for coherent and integrated supervision of all disciplines.

== C.A. and leaders ==
A fifteen-member Board of Directors administered the organization. Ten of them were appointed by the Quebec Minister of State for the Economy and Finance, including the president and vice-president.

Of these ten appointed members, five were chosen to represent the public and five from the financial planning, life and health insurance, property and casualty insurance, deposit insurance and mutual funds sectors.

The last five members came from the Chambers (three from the Chambre de la sécurité financière (Québec) and two from the Chambre de l'assurance de dommages (Québec)).

From 1998 to 2004, Louise Champoux-Paillé acted as president and CEO of the organization.

== History ==
1998 - Created by the "Law on the Distribution of Financial Products and Services", the BSF began its activities in the autumn of 1998. In its first year, the BSF has put in place the resources required to ensure its mission.

1999 - As of 1 October 1999, the BSF replaced the "Life and Health Insurance Board" and the "Property and Casualty Insurance Board". The BSF also assumed part of the mission of the "Commission des valeurs mobilières du Québec" (Québec Securities Commission) (CVMQ) in respect of representatives and firms that were active in group savings, investment contracts or scholarship plans, in particular for the issue of exercise rights. The BSF also replaced the "Inspector General of Financial Institutions" (IGIF) in the framework of all multidisciplinary firms and financial planners.

Several regulatory adjustments have been required following the adoption of the "Law on the Distribution of Financial Products and Services", in particular the upgrading of minimum training after 2002, the ownership of firms in the life and health insurance disciplines and in the group insurance of persons (agent and broker) and the notice of special consent. The BSF then published all of its administrative regulations and rules of procedure, as well as those of the Chambers (CSF and CAD).

2001 - Signature of three years agreements with certain professional orders (Adm.A., C.A., Notaires and c.g.a.) for the supervision of their members entitled to the title "Financial Planner". Holding of the first elections of the directors of the Chambers. Establishment of the decision-making committees of registered companies. The BSF then oversees 37,225 representatives and 6910 companies in the eight disciplines defined by Bill 188.

2002 - Establishment of an information and referral center as well as an inspection and investigation service. Finalization of the procedure for handling complaints in the office. Most disclosure articles come into force. Workgroup start-up, including accessibility to professional liability insurance, damage insurance examinations and the new life and health insurance qualification program (LLPQ) set up by Canadian counterparts.

2003 - Entry into force of regulations, disclosures, and distribution guides. Regulation no. 1 of the BSF modifies the minimum training requirements for the disciplines of group insurance, damage insurance and claims adjudication.

2004 - As part of the Autorité des marchés financiers (Québec) (AMF) as of February 1, 2004, the BSF ended its operations after five years. The BSF thus transferred to the AMF, in particular, 72 statutory powers under the Act, 14 regulations and 17 directives and moratoria adopted; a survey inspection service; a supervision of distribution without a representative; an information center, and a complaint and dispute resolution mechanism; an operational structure for the management of career access (minimum training, examinations, internship); an operational structure for managing the issuance and renewal of representative and registration certificates for firms, independent companies and independent representatives; a computer system for all multidisciplinary administrative operations of training, pre-certification, certification and registration; and an up-to-date register of more than 39,000 representatives and 6660 registered companies.

== See also ==
=== Related Articles ===
- Autorité des marchés financiers (Québec) (Financial Market Authority) (AMF)
- Chambre de la sécurité financière (Québec) (Chamber of Financial Security) (CSF)
- Chambre de l'assurance de dommages (Québec) (Damage Insurance Chamber) (CAD)
- Institut québécois de planification financière (Financial Planning Institute of Québec) (IQPF)
- Market manipulation
- Insider trading
- Applied Ethics
- Financial ethics
- List of business and finance abbreviations
- Ordre des Administrateurs Agréés du Québec (Chartered Administrators Order of Québec) (Adm.A.)

=== External links ===
- Official website of the "Autorité des marches financiers" (AMF) in Québec
- Official website of the "Chambre de la sécurité financière" (CSF)
- Official website of the "Chambre de l'assurance de dommages" (CAD)
