= Institut québécois de planification financière =

Training institute in financial planning

Institute of Financial Planning
- Formation: 1989-10-05
- Legal status: Non-profit organization
- Headquarters: 3 Place du Commerce, suite 501 Île-des-Sœurs, Verdun (Québec) H3E 1H7
- Members: 5000
- Board of directors: Bernard Fortin MBA, FCSI®, C.Adm., F.Pl., FICB, Chair of the Board
- Key people: Chantal Lamoureux, LL.B., CRHA, Distinction Fellow, ICD.D, President & CEO, Secretary
- Affiliations: Autorité des marchés financiers (Quebec) (AMF) and FP Canada
- Website: https://institutpf.org/en/

The Institute of Financial Planning (formerly Institut québécois de planification financière, or IQPF) is the only organization in Quebec (Canada) authorized to grant the financial planning diploma which leads to the Financial Planner (F.Pl.) title.

In addition, the institute develops and delivers professional development activities for financial planners. Financial planners must accumulate professional development units in three categories:

- Integrated personal financial planning (IPFP)
- Training activities in one or more of the financial planning areas (SFPA)
- Training activities in subjects pertaining to compliance with standards, ethics and business conduct (SC), and training activities in subjects pertaining to compliance with standards, ethics and business conduct related directly to financial planning (SC-FP)

== Regulation of financial planners ==
In Quebec, under article 57 of the "Loi sur la distribution des produits et services financiers" (Act respecting the distribution of financial products and services), only a person holding a diploma in financial planning issued by the Institute may obtain, from the Autorité des marchés financiers (Quebec) (AMF), a certificate authorizing the person to use the title of financial planner.

The Chambre de la sécurité financière (CSF) is responsible for financial planners' ethical obligations since 1998. Financial planners that are members of the Ordre des Administrateurs Agréés du Québec fall under their professional order's regulation, according to an agreement with the AMF.

== Awards and distinctions ==
Institute Fellow

The Institute's Fellow distinction is awarded since 2019 by the Institute's Board of Directors to honour people who have made extraordinary contributions to the development and influence of the profession. Since 2023, these individuals must hold the Institute's Financial Planning Diploma and have held the title of F.Pl. for at least 10 years. Here are the recipients:

2019 - Jocelyne Houle-LeSarge
2020 - Martin Dupras and Claude Paquin
2021 - Nathalie Bachand and Cary List
2022 - Lorena Biason and Daniel Laverdière
2023 - Caroline Marion, Nancy Paquet and Denis Preston

Institute Distinction

Launched in 2023, the Institute Distinction award is given by the Institute's Board of Directors to recognize the extraordinary contribution of individuals to the development and influence of the financial planning profession. Here are the recipients:

2023 - Carl Thibeault

Trainers of the Year

Since 2009, the Institute has awarded the title of "Trainer of the Year" annually to recognize and encourage excellence in the Institute's instructors. The award is granted for the previous year's performance. The recipients of these awards are:

2008 - Martine Berthelet and Pierre Larose
2009 - Martine Berthelet and Annie Boivin
2010 - Marthine Berthelet and Robert McLaughlin
2011 - Daniel T. Jolin and Jean Turcotte
2012 - Martine Berthelet and Caroline Marion
2013 - Martine Berthelet and Denis Preston
2014 - Nancy D'Amours, Caroline Marion and Denis Preston
2015 - Nancy D'Amours, Caroline Marion and Denis Preston
2016 - Martin Dupras, Caroline Marion and Jean Turcotte
2017 - Martin Dupras and Sylvain Houde
2018 - Nancy D'Amours and Denis Preston
2019 - Caroline Marion and Felice Torre
2020 - Denis Preston and Guy Sauvé
2021 - François Archambault
2022 - Nancy D'Amours

Recruit of the Year

The Recruit of the Year award is given since 2023 by the Institute's Board of Directors to recognize financial planners who have made an exceptional start to their careers and who have distinguished themselves in various ways, including outstanding service to the Institute, the financial planning profession or the community. Here are the recipients:

2023 - Étienne Bélanger and Jean-François Girard

Honorary members

From 2007 to 2020, the Institute has awarded honorary membership annually to financial planners who had distinguished themselves in a variety of ways, including providing exceptional services to the Institute, the financial planning profession or the community. These recipients are:

2007 - Jean-Guy Grenier
2007 - Guy Jasmin
2008 - Henri Gagnon
2009 - Daniel Laverdière
2010 - Robert McLaughlin
2011 - Thérèse Quirion
2012 - Gilles Garon
2013 - Natalie Hotte
2014 - Fabien Champagne
2015 - Michel Lavoie
2016 - Pierre Larose
2017 - Sylvain Chartier
2018 - Denis Preston
2020 - Nancy Paquet
2020 - Dany Provost

In addition, the presidents of the Institute's Board of Directors were appointed honorary members until 2020.

Prix de journalisme en littératie financière

From 2012 to 2018, the Institute awarded a "Prix de journalisme en littératie financière" to a journalist in Québec who contributed, by their actions, their implication and their outreach, to the financial education of Quebecers and by so doing, to the influence of financial planning. The winners were:

2012 – Stéphanie Grammond
2013 – Gérald Fillion
2014 – René Vézina
2015 – Marc Tison
2016 – Pierre-Yves McSween
2017 – François Gagnon
2018 - Daniel Germain

== History of the Institute ==
- 1989 - The passing of the Act respecting market intermediaries, providing for the creation of a "Institut québécois de planification financière". The Institute was created in 1989 under the 3rd part of the Quebec Companies Act, following the coming into force of the Act respecting market intermediaries (RSQ c. I-15.1), passed on June 21, 1989, by the National Assembly of Quebec:

"The Minister shall, before granting his accreditation to a Québec institute of financial planners, obtain the advice of the Inspector General.

The accredited institute shall, by a by-law subject to the approval of the Government, determine the conditions governing the issuance of financial planner's diplomas, including those relating to equivalence, and the terms and conditions of payment of the contributions to be paid by the persons who use the title of financial planner."

- 1992 - The Institute holds its first official graduation ceremony.
- 1996 - The first "Certificate in personal financial planning" program begins in the autumn of 1996 at the University of Laval with 850 registrations. Today, a dozen or so institutions offer a program in personal financial planning approved by the Institute.
- 1996 - Publication of the first edition of "La Collection de l'IQPF", the reference work for financial planners.
- 1997 - The Institute develops the Competency profile of financial planners, which aims to define the financial planner's role, as well as the professional skills essential to the practice of financial planning.
- 1998- The passing of the Act respecting the distribution of financial products and services (bill 188), which recognizes the Institute as the exclusive authority in granting the financial planning diploma and establishing the rules concerning the ongoing professional development of professional financial planners. Bill 188 comes into force in 1999.
- 1998- The Institute partners up with five other organizations to hold the first Financial Planning Week. This annual event turned into the Mois de la planification financière de la retraite, organized by Question Retraite.
- 1999 - Professional development becomes mandatory for financial planners.
- 1999 - The Institute amends its regulation on the basic education of financial planners to make the bachelor's degree (or equivalent training) the standard for obtaining the financial planner diploma. This minimum standard came into force in 2002 for new registrants and in 2005 for those who were already enrolled in the training program leading to the title.
- 2001 - Approval by decree of the new regulation on the compulsory professional development of financial planners, which is administered by the Institute.
- December 2002 - The Act respecting the "Agence nationale d'encadrement du secteur financier", which became the Act respecting the "Autorité des marchés financiers" (AMF) in 2004, recognizes the Institute as the only organization authorized to grant the financial planning diploma in Quebec. The Institute determines the diploma requirements as well as those for academic equivalency. The AMF must consult with the Institute on all matters relating to financial planning. The Institute reports to the AMF when it comes to financial planners' compliance with professional development requirements.
- 2004 - First edition of the "Professional Standards in Financial Planning" including Ethical Standards.
- 2004 - The Institute files a formal application with the Office des professions du Québec (OPQ) requesting the creation of a professional order of financial planners.
- 2005 - The bachelor's degree is required to obtain the Institute's diploma.
- 2007 - Entry into force of the new Regulation respecting the compulsory professional development of financial planners, which is administered by the Institute.
- 2007 - The OPQ launches a public consultation on the Institute's request to establish a professional order of financial planners. 238 individuals and 27 ministries, organizations, professional associations and financial institutions responded to this consultation. Individual respondents are overwhelmingly in favor of the creation of a new order.
- 2008 - After a long study by the Advisory Committee, the Office des professions du Québec does not recommend the establishment of a professional order of financial planners, arguing that the current regulation framework is sufficient. Despite this outcome, the Institute continues to call for the creation of a professional order of financial planners.
- 2008 - Launch of the Solution IQPF, online tool which includes "La Collection de l'IQPF", "Professional Standards", the "La Cible" magazine and hyperlinks to legal documents. 2008 - Launch of the "Projection Assumption Guidelines".
- 2010 - The Institute grants the "Affiliated to the IQPF" status to all accredited financial planners in Québec.
- June 2010 - The IQPF becomes the 7th member organization of the Financial Planning Standards Council (FPSC).
- May 2011- The Institute and four other organizations join to form the "Coalition for Professional Standards for Financial Planners", now called the "Financial Planning Coalition". The mandate of the Coalition is to lay the foundations for the profession of financial planner in Canada and to promote the formal recognition of financial planning as a distinct profession. The Coalition currently consists of four organizations: the Canadian Institute of Financial Planners (CIFPs), the Financial Planning Standards Council (FPSC, renamed FP Canada in 2019), the Institute of Advanced Financial Planners (IAFP) and the "Institut québécois de planification financière" (renamed Institut de planification financière, or, in English, Institute of Financial Planning, in 2023).
- 2011 - The Institute and the FPSC (renamed FP Canada in 2019) agree on a common set of principles within their respective Codes of Ethics.
- December 1, 2011 - Entry into force of the AMF's new regulation respecting the compulsory professional development of financial planners, which is administered by the Institute.
- 2012 - Reciprocal agreement with the Association française des Conseils en gestion de patrimoine certifiés (CGPC).
- 2015 - Publication of the guide entitled "Financial Planning in Canada: Definitions, Standards and Competencies" by the IQPF and the FPSC (renamed FP Canada in 2019).
- 2015 - The FPSC (renamed FP Canada in 2019) joins the Institute in publishing the "Projection Assumption Guidelines", which become Canada-wide guidelines.
- 2015 - The Institute and FPSC (renamed FP Canada in 2019) launch an app for their Projection Assumption Guidelines.
- 2016 - The Institute's official magazine, La Cible, now published in digital format.
- 2017 - The Institute and FPSC (renamed FP Canada in 2019) publish an Addendum to the Projection Assumption Guidelines, which provides the data sources on which the Projection Assumption Guidelines are based, as well as calculations for inflation standards and rates of return.
- September 2023 - The Institute launches its first specialization program, Accompagner et conseiller l'entrepreneur dans sa PFPI, the ACE program, as well as a Competency Guide for F.Pl.
- December 2023 - The Institut québécois de planification financière becomes the Institut de planification financière (in English, Institute of Financial Planning).

List of Institute Presidents: Charles Pelletier (1989-1992), Jocelyne Gagnon (1992-1993), Jean-Claude Lefebvre (1993-1994), Robert Lafond (1994-1995), Michel Mailloux (1995-1996 et 2000–2002), Paul Turcot (1996-1997), Anne-Marie Girard-Plouffe (1997-1998), Réjean Ross (1998-1999), Denis Boucher (1999-2000), Richard Pilotte (2002-2004), Jean Girard (2004-2005), André Buteau (2005-2006), Gilles Sinclair (2006-2008), Robin W. De Celles (2008-2010), Martin Dupras (2010-2012), Yves L. Giroux (2012-2014), Nathalie Bachand (2014-2016), Sylvain B. Tremblay (2016-2018), Julie Raîche (2018-2020), Daniel Lanteigne (2020-2022), Bernard Fortin (2022-).

== See also ==
- FP Canada
- Autorité des marchés financiers (Quebec) (AMF)
- Chambre de la sécurité financière (Québec) (CSF)
- Ordre des Administrateurs Agréés du Québec (domain of patrimonial management)
- Personal finance
- Financial planning (business)
- Financial plan
