= Tax advisor =

Financial expert trained in tax law

A tax advisor or tax consultant is a person with advanced training and knowledge of tax law. The services of a tax advisor are usually retained in order to minimize taxation while remaining compliant with the law in complicated financial situations. Tax advisors are also retained to represent clients before tax authorities and tax courts to resolve tax issues.

== Money ==
=== Austria ===
In Austria, Steuerberater is the professional license for tax advisors.

=== Germany ===
In Germany, Steuerberater is the professional license for tax advisors. Moreover, attorneys-at-law (Rechtsanwälte) and Certified Public Accountants (Wirtschaftsprüfer) are allowed by law the practise tax law in Germany. All three aforementioned professions have unlimited representation rights, including representing clients in front of German tax courts (Finanzgerichte).

=== Italy ===
In Italy, tax advisors are called commercialisti, and provide assistance in business management, business law, economics, finance, tax, accounting, commercial, corporate and administrative matters. Dottori commercialisti, who have a degree in economics, and ragionieri commercialisti, who have a specific high school diploma, were members of two different professional orders, which were merged in 2008 into the Ordine dei Dottori Commercialisti e degli Esperti Contabili (Italian for "Professional order of tax advisors"). Access to this order is now restricted with specific laurea magistrale qualifications. Esperti contabili, whose roles are similar to those of a commercialista, must have a laurea, a first cycle degree that is equivalent to a bachelor's degree. According to Italian law, the following activities are some of the roles of a commercialista:

- Administration and liquidation of companies and assets;
- Surveys and technical advice;
- Inspections and administrative reviews;
- Verifications and investigations regarding the reliability of financial statements, accounts and records of a company.

=== Japan ===
In Japan, there is a specific license for tax advisors called certified public tax accountant (税理士, zeirishi). In order to obtain this qualification, an individual must pass a special state examination, or already be qualified as an attorney at law or certified public accountant.

=== South Korea ===
In South Korea, there is a specific license for tax advisors called certified tax accountant (세무사). In order to obtain this qualification, an individual must pass a special examination.

=== United Kingdom ===
In the UK, guidelines concerning professional conduct in relation to taxation are published in conjunction with the Chartered Institute of Taxation, the Association of Taxation Technicians, the Institute of Indirect Taxation, the Institute of Chartered Accountants in England and Wales, the Institute of Chartered Accountants of Scotland, the Society of trust and estate practitioners (STEP) and the Association of Chartered Certified Accountants. These were prepared for the assistance of members of the various associations both generally in dealing with clients and the tax authorities and specifically in relation to irregularities and errors.

The guidelines, which include practical advice about a range of legal and ethical issues, are summarised as:

- A member's primary duty is to ensure that his actions comply with the law. He/she owes a contractual duty to the client to act for him/her with the requisite degree of skill and care, and the contractual relationship should be governed by a letter of engagement. The member also has duties to the tax authorities, notably of compliance with the law and the honest presentation of his client's circumstances.
- It is the taxpayer's responsibility to ensure that returns made to the tax authorities are correct and complete. It is for the member to assist him to decide on the extent and manner of disclosure of facts in relation to his tax affairs.
- Where a member becomes aware that irregularities have occurred in relation to a client's tax affairs he should advise the client of the consequences, and the manner of disclosure. If necessary, appropriate specialist advice should be taken.
- Where a client refuses to follow the advice of a member in relation to issues involving disclosure, the member should consider whether he should continue to act. If appropriate, specialist advice should be taken.
- If mistakes are made by the tax authorities there may be a need, and in some cases a duty, on the part of the client and sometimes the member, to put matters right.
- Members may have statutory duties of disclosure where they have suspicions of criminal activity.
- When approached for information on a client's affairs by another adviser the member should ensure that he has his client's authority before making any disclosure.
- Ethical tax guidelines balance law compliance and client service.

=== United States ===
In the United States, the titles "tax advisor" and "tax professional" are generic terms describing several occupations focused on minimizing tax risk and counseling clients on financial management to limit total tax paid.

Generally, tax advisors can be divided into three types: tax return preparers, Certified Public Accountants (CPAs), and tax attorneys. In addition, any of these three types of professionals may choose to become an Enrolled Agent (EA) by successfully passing an exam administered by the Internal Revenue Service. EA licensure gives the tax advisor federal representational rights, or the right to speak on a client's behalf to IRS staff on matters related to federal tax obligations.

==== Tax return preparer ====
Tax return preparers assist taxpayers in filling out federal and state tax forms, or do so on their behalf. To do so at the federal level as a business or vocation requires a tax advisor to become a Registered Tax Return Preparer — requiring the candidate pass a 120-question, multiple choice quiz —or to work directly under the supervision of a CPA.

There are no mandatory educational requirements to become a tax return preparer. As of 2022, there were 82,370 professional tax return preparers in the United States with a median annual salary of $55,840.

==== Certified Public Accountant (CPA) ====
CPAs are authorized to undertake any of the duties of a Registered Tax Return Preparer, without obtaining that specific credential, and can also provide financial audit and attestation services, and supervise unregistered tax return preparers.

CPAs are licensed by licensure bodies in each state and territory. Generally, to obtain licensure, they must hold a Bachelor's degree in accounting, pass a written exam, and undergo a minimum period of work under the supervision of a CPA. Some CPAs are also tax attorneys, and some tax attorneys are also CPAs.

As of 2022, CPAs had an average base salary of $79,316.

==== Tax attorney ====
Tax attorneys are persons licensed to practice law in a state or territory and who focus on tax law. Tax attorneys can represent clients in state and federal courts and before the United States Tax Court. Some CPAs are also tax attorneys, and some tax attorneys are also CPAs.

As of 2022, tax attorneys had an average base salary of $133,580.

== See also ==
- Tax avoidance
- Tax evasion
- Taxation in Germany
- Worshipful Company of Tax Advisers
