= Ivanovski =

Ivanovski (Macedonian: Ивановски; feminine: Ivanovska, Macedonian: Ивановска) is a common Macedonian surname that means 'son of Ivan'. Occasionally the Russian surname Ivanovsky is transliterated as "Ivanovski".

Notable people with the surname include:

- Aleksandar Ivanovski, Macedonian lawyer
- Daniel Ivanovski (born 1983), Macedonian football player
- Dario Ivanovski, Macedonian long-distance runner
- Filip Ivanovski (born 1985), Macedonian footballer
- Katarina Ivanovska (born 1988), Macedonian model and actress
- Mirko Ivanovski (born 1989), Macedonian footballer playing for Hajduk Split
- Viacheslav Ivanovski (born 1975), Israeli Olympic weightlifter
- Kalin Ivanovski (born 2004), Macedonian tennis player
