= Raymond Chabot Grant Thornton =

Canadian accounting firm

- Headquarters: Montreal, Quebec
- Area served: Canada
- Website: Official website

Raymond Chabot Grant Thornton (RCGT) is a member firm of Grant Thornton International Ltd. This Canadian firm covers areas of assurance, tax, advisory, and business recovery, reorganization services and cybersecurity. It has over 5,400 professionals, including more than 450 partners. The company hands over its services to socio-economic sectors like SMEs, large businesses and public and para-public organizations.

As of January 2026, Samuel Havida serves as the company's president. The firm has 100+ offices throughout Quebec, as well as in Ottawa and Edmundston. It offers its services and through affiliates: Raymond Chabot Inc, Raymond Chabot Ressources Humaines, Taxo, Operio, Auray Capital, RCGT Consulting and Catallaxy.

== History and founders ==
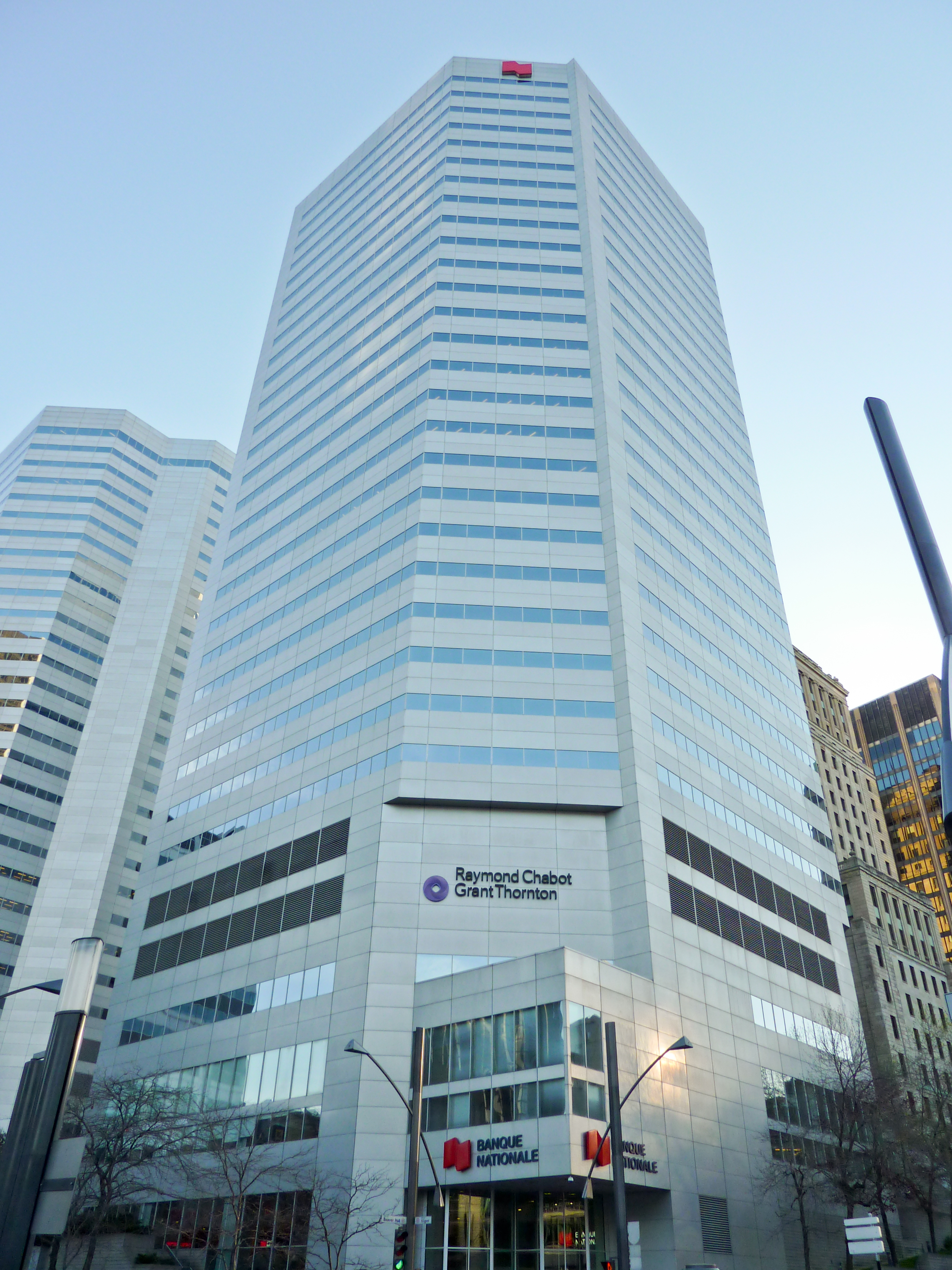
The head office of Raymond Chabot Grant Thornton is located in the National Bank Tower.

Jacques Raymond was born in Montréal on 30 September 1919, to French-Canadian parents. After secondary studies at Collège Jean-de-Brébeuf in Outremont, he took night courses at HEC Montréal, and obtained his title of Chartered Accountant. He later became a Chartered Administrator and Certified Management Consultant.

He founded a small accounting firm in Montreal with Guy Chabot in 1948, named Raymond Chabot, which later became Raymond, Chabot, Martin & Cie when Guy Martin joined the firm. In 1967, with Jacques Paré joining, the business took the name Raymond Chabot Martin Paré, which stayed under that name until May 1998, when they took the current name of Raymond Chabot Grant Thornton, the biggest of its kind in Quebec as of 2021.

Raymond was President of the Ordre des comptables agréés du Québec and the Canadian Tax Foundation. He was life member of the Institute of Chartered Accountants of Ontario (now CPA Ontario), honorary member of Club social Saint-Denis and Club de tennis Mont-Royal.

Raymond received the title of Fellow, indicated by the letters FCA. He was also a recipient of the Queen Elizabeth II Golden Jubilee Medal, and named Man of the Month from Commerce magazine; also decorated with the Merit of HEC and title of "Bâtisseur du 20e siècle" from the Chamber of Commerce of greater Montreal. Raymond died on March 6, 2010, in Westmount.

== Services ==
- Assurance
- Taxation
- Corporate Finance
- Advisory
- Strategic Performance & Consulting
- Private Management
- Human Resources
- Occupational Health & Safety

== Insolvency and restructuring ==
Raymond Chabot Grant Thornton provides insolvency and financial restructuring services in Canada through licensed insolvency trustees operating under the Raymond Chabot brand. These activities are conducted in accordance with the provisions of the Bankruptcy and Insolvency Act of Canada.

The firm's insolvency-related activities began in 1981 following the acquisition of the trustee firm Mercure Béliveau, marking its entry into insolvency and financial restructuring services in Quebec. These services have since evolved alongside changes in the Canadian legal and regulatory framework governing insolvency, including processes such as personal bankruptcy and consumer proposals.

Insolvency services are carried out by licensed insolvency trustees, who are regulated by the Office of the Superintendent of Bankruptcy of Canada. Trustees affiliated with Raymond Chabot are listed in the official registry maintained by the Government of Canada. Trustees may also be identified using search tools provided by the Canadian Association of Insolvency and Restructuring Professionals (CAIRP).

== See also ==
- Grant Thornton International Ltd.
- Raymond Chabot Grant Thornton Park
- (fr) Jacques Raymond
