= Order of Physicians =

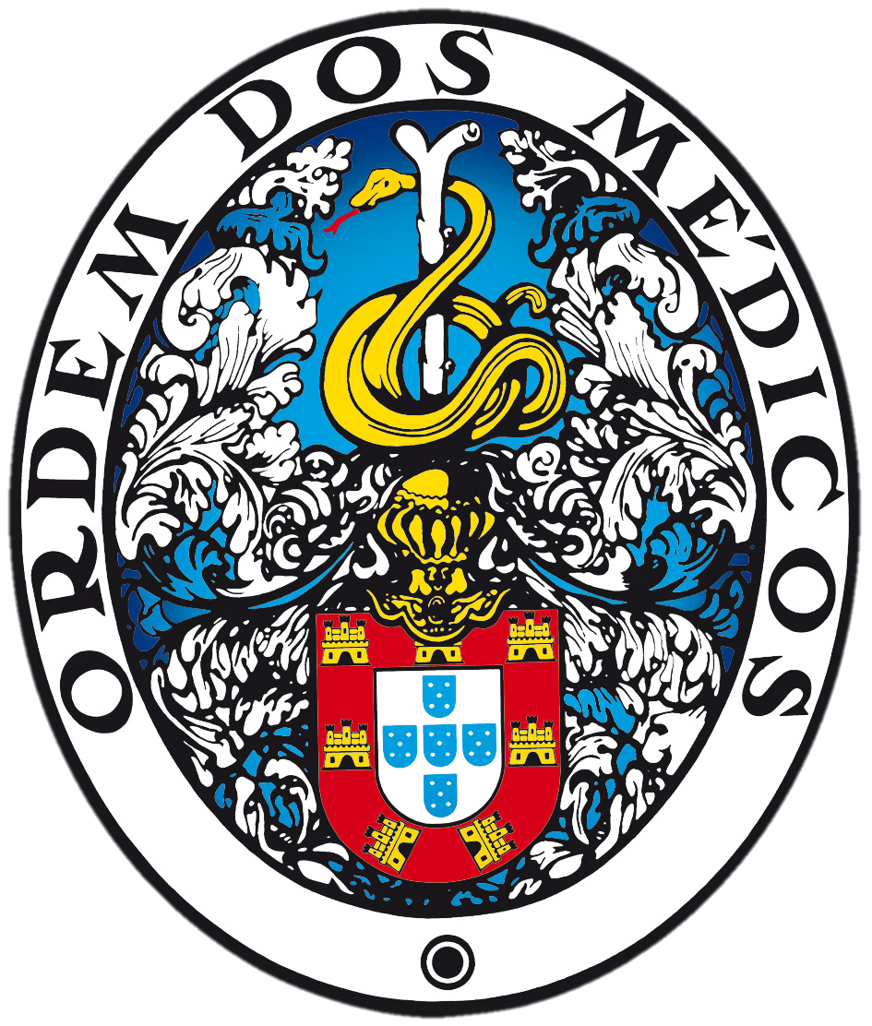
- Formation: 24 November 1938; 87 years ago (1898, as the Association of Portuguese Physicians)
- Headquarters: 151, Av. Alm. Gago Coutinho; 1749–084 Lisbon
- Mace-Bearer (Bastonário): Carlos Cortes
- Website: ordemdosmedicos.pt

The Order of Physicians MHSE (Portuguese: Ordem dos Médicos) is the public entity that serves as the regulatory and licensing body for physicians in Portugal. As a professional order, it is responsible for licensing physicians to practice medicine, for the deontological norms that regulate the medical profession, it has an autonomous disciplinary regime, and represents the profession vis-à-vis the public authorities.

It was first established in 1898, as the Association of Portuguese Physicians (Portuguese: Associação dos Médicos Portugueses), the first of its kind in the country. It was incorporated as the Order of Physicians by Decree-Law No. 29 171 of 24 November 1938, and its first Chairman (with the distinctive title of Bastonário; literally, Mace-Bearer) was Elísio de Azevedo e Moura (1877–1977). The current Mace-Bearer is Carlos Cortes, elected in 2023.

The Order of Physicians is also responsible for the technical standards of postgraduate medical training and attributes clinicians with the degree of specialist.
