= Ordine dei Dottori Commercialisti e degli Esperti Contabili =

- Abbreviation: ODCEC
- Formation: 1 January 2008
- Headquarters: Rome, Italy
- Region served: Italy

The Ordine dei Dottori Commercialisti e degli Esperti Contabili (ODCEC) (Italian for "Professional order of tax advisors") is the Italian professional accounting body offering the dottore commercialista and esperto contabile qualifications. In 2008 it was created from the merger of the professional orders of dottori commercialisti, ragionieri commercialisti and periti commerciali due to Legislative Decree No 139/2005. It is composed of different non-economic public bodies: the Consiglio Nazionale dei Dottori Commercialisti e degli Esperti Contabili (Italian for 'National council of tax advisors') and the territorial entities.

== History ==
The Decrees of the President of the Italian Republic No. 1067 and 1068 of 27 October 1953 established the territorial orders of dottori commercialisti (tax advisors with a degree in economics) and the local colleges of ragionieri commercialisti and periti commerciali (tax advisors with a high school diploma), which would be coordinated, supervised and represented by the corresponding national board, at the Ministry of Justice of Italy.

Both decrees were abolished by Legislative Decree No 139/2005, so the members of the territorial orders and local colleges were transferred to section A of ODCEC's professional register and it is now impossible to become a commercialista without a laurea magistrale.
