= Taxation (magazine) =

British magazine

Taxation Magazine
- Type: Weekly
- Format: Magazine
- Owner(s): LexisNexis
- Editor: Mike Truman
- Founded: October 1927
- Headquarters: Quadrant House, The Quadrant, Sutton, SM2 5AS, UK
- Circulation: Over 8,500 ABC audited
- Price: single copy: £6.50; Subscription price: UK 1 year £284
- ISSN: 0040-0149

Taxation is an English-language weekly magazine for professional UK tax advisors. It is owned by LexisNexis, part of RELX. The magazine is edited in the LexisNexis Sutton office. The first issue was published on 1 October 1927. It has been in continuous publication ever since. The masthead declares that the magazine has been 'since 1927 the leading authority on tax law, practice and administration'. It is published on Thursdays.

== Contents ==
Each issue of Taxation usually contains about 25 pages of editorial. The issues also contain display, recruitment advertising and a directory of service providers. The editorial content is written by contributors and by a small in-house team with a background in the tax profession. Typical contents include:

- Comment article – expressing the view of the contributor about a particular technical tax issue, typically calling for a change in the law or in HM Revenue & Customs practice.
- Update – news of changes in tax and comment on them from industry spokespeople, plus concise coverage of recent tax cases.
- Feature articles – normally three main articles, around 2000 – 3000 words each, examining a particular tax issue in technical detail. Occasionally there are interviews with leading figures in the tax industry.
- Meeting points – concise reports of practical tax issues taken from presentations at conferences and seminars.
- Feedback – correspondence from readers.
- Readers' Forum – technical tax questions sent in by readers, which are then answered three issues later by other readers.

== History ==
The magazine was founded by its first editor, Ronald Staples, and originally published by Gee & Company, and then by Taxation Publishing Company, formed in 1932. It was sold in 1984 to Tolley Publishing Co, which through a series of mergers became part of LexisNexis.

Staples, who was also a founding member of what became the Chartered Institute of Taxation continued as editor until 1957. Subsequent editors have been:

- Percy Hughes 1957 – 1977
- Ken Tingley 1978 – 1984
- Simon Owen 1984 – 1988
- Malcolm Gunn 1988 – 2004
- Mike Truman 2004 – 2015
- Richard Curtis 2015–present

== Online ==
The magazine's website, www.taxation.co.uk, has an archive of articles going back to 2000. Most of the site is behind a subscription log-in, but some articles - most notably those in the Latest News section - are available to non-subscribers. Subscribers to the magazine can get a log-in to the website at no extra cost.

== Weekly e-Newsletter ==
Each Wednesday an e-newsletter is sent to all registered readers – this is a mix of subscribers and those that have signed up to receive the newsletter, which is free of charge. The newsletter contains links straight into the most recent articles as well as listing the latest jobs that have been posted on www.taxation-jobs.co.uk and a calendar on upcoming events of interest to tax professionals.

== Circulation ==
Circulation for the magazine, audited by the Audit Bureau of Circulations (ABC), was over 8,500. Each issue's official date range is from Thursday to the next Wednesday, and in the UK print copies are dispatched late Wednesday, for Friday delivery to customers. Retail outlets receive their copies on Thursday/Friday depending on their location. The Taxation website posts each week's new content on Wednesday morning, ahead of the official publication date.
