= Chambre de la sécurité financière =

Chambre de la sécurité financière (Québec)
Agency overview
- Formed: 1998
- Jurisdiction: Canadian province of Quebec
- Headquarters: Québec, Canada
- Agency executive: President and CEO, Marie Élaine Farley
- Website: www.chambresf.com

The Chambre de la sécurité financière (English: Chamber of Financial Security) is the self-regulatory organization for representatives subject to Autorité des marchés financiers (Québec) distributing financial products and services, and Financial Planners of Quebec (Canada).

The reason of being of CSF is to ensure the integrity and professionalism of its members by maintaining discipline and by ensuring the training and supervision of its members.

The CSF supervises about 32,000 members who have ethical obligations. Those subjects to the CSF must take care of the interests of their clients and establish a relationship of trust with them in their consulting services. In their approach, they must know their client well and make the right diagnosis on their financial health. They must identify the specific needs of their clients, address their concerns and issues; in addition, they help them make good decisions in the choice of financial products and services and in their implementation.

== Services to the Public ==
The "Info-Déonto" application on the CSF website informs the public about the ethical standards and obligations that financial products professionals must comply with. The Public Protection section of the site is also specifically designed to guide the consumer in establishing a healthy relationship with a member of the CSF.

== Operation ==
From its founding until 2014, the CSF consisted of 20 regional sections. Each period of mandatory continuing education is two years starting on the first day of December.

The Act respecting the distribution of financial products and services (ADFPS) provides that the board of directors of the CSF is made up of 11 directors, nine of whom are elective. Of these nine positions, six are elected on a regional basis: three for the insurance of persons discipline and three for the group savings plan brokerage discipline. Representatives of investment contract and scholarship plans, group insurance of persons and financial planning are elected by all the representatives of these disciplines, on a voluntary basis. provincial. Finally, two (2) directors are appointed by the Minister of Finance to represent the public and complete the total of 11 directors.

== History ==
Around 1905, volunteers from the Montreal and Quebec regional associations joined forces to form the "Association des assureurs-vie du Canada" (AAVC)(English: Association of Life Insurers of Canada). Subsequently, this organization became the "Association provinciale des assureurs-vie du Québec"(APAVQ) (English: Quebec Association of Life Underwriters), which was replaced by the "Association des intermédiaires en assurance de personnes du Québec" (AIAPQ) (English: Association of Life and Health Insurance Intermediaries of Quebec). The latter ceased to exist in 1999 to be replaced by the CSF.

This organization was incorporated in 1998 by the "Act respecting the distribution of financial products and services" (RSQ, c. D-9.2). It is vested with the same powers as any Professional Order created under the Professional Code of Quebec (L.R.Q., c. C-26). More specifically, its mission is "to ensure the protection of the public by maintaining discipline and by ensuring training and professional ethics" of its members.

- 1999 - Start of operations of the Financial Security Chamber (CSF).
- 2001 - The CSF, insurance companies and Université Laval join together to finance the development of a certificate in insurance and group annuities.
- 2003 - Restructuring of the executive management which will be headed from 2004 by an executive VP.
- 2004 - Implementation of the Law on the National Agency for Financial Sector Supervision (Law 107) granting the CSF a role of self-regulatory organization. Amendments to the By-Laws giving a new mandate to the regional chapters who will henceforth play a key role at general meetings of the CSF, represented by administrators and delegates.
- 2006 - Launch of mandatory compliance training effective December 1 st. 2006.
- 2007 - New regulation to bail out the financial services compensation fund. First cohort of graduates of the group insurance and annuities certificate
- 2008 - New Regulation on Mandatory Continuing Education in force at 1 Dec. 2008. The group savings sector is now under the Securities Act, rather than the ADFPS. Agreement between the "College of Corporate Directors" and the CSF to participate in the development and dissemination of certain training content in the college's courses. Establishment of the "Prix d'Excellence" and the "Prix de la relève".
- 2009 - Launch of the new website of the CSF.
- 2010 - Beginning of the systematic diffusion of all the disciplinary radiations of the CSF.
- 2011 - New Regulation on Compulsory Continuing Education of the CSF, effective December 1 st. 2011; this regulation now allows the postponement of up to 5 surplus PDUs. Putting on-line the Info-déonto website, a reference center for CSF professionals. Revised the brand image of the CSF with a new logo and a new signature.
- 2012 - First Internet vote for the CA election of the CSF. New CSF-Advocis Mutual Recognition Agreement Promoting the Mobility of Registered Life Insurers (A.V.A.) in Canada. Advertising campaign to increase the reputation of the CSF.
- 2013 - The Info-Déonto site now available to the general public. Launch of a mandatory course in compliance for members. Appearance of the CSF on social media. Electronic edition of the magazine "Financial Security" of the CSF.
- 2014 - Official launch of the Corporation of Financial Services Professionals (CDPSF) on June 6, 2014, initiated by the regional chapters. This project started in 2011 with the aim of separating the activities of member associations from its mission of protecting the public. Migration of CSF regional sections as of Oct 22, 2014 to CDPSF. After fifteen years of activity, the CSF's regional sections become autonomous corporations. The mission of this council is to bring together all professionals in financial services, valuing the advisory role while promoting their interests and strengthening the bonds of trust and professional solidarity. The CSF is the 2014 recipient of a "Mention of the Quebec Grands Prix de la qualité", organized by the "Mouvement québécois de la qualité" (Quebec Quality Mouvement), under the auspices of the Quebec government. Launch of the new adaptive website.
- 2015 - New platform of the CSF website, deployed on June 25 as part of a major overhaul of applications used by staff and members of the CSF. CSF advertising campaign with the character of "woolen stockings".
- 2016- New multiplatform advertising campaign of the CSF under the theme of financial health. Launch of the second compulsory course in compliance for members.
- Sept. 2017 - Bill 141 is tabled at the National Assembly of Quebec, proposing the amalgamation of the CSF's mission to the Autorité des marchés financiers (Québec) (AMF).
- June 13, 2018 - Adoption of Bill 141 (amended) at the National Assembly of Quebec, after having withdrawn the project of amalgamation of the CSF at the AMF.

CEOs of the CSF:

- Lucie Granger, executive director (1999-2003);
- Yves Gagné, executive VP and chief executive officer (2004-2005);
- Luc Labelle, VP executive and chief executive officer in 2005 until March 13, 2015;
- Marie Elaine Farley, president and chief executive officer since 2015

Chairmen of the board of directors:

- Martin Rochon, (1999-2004);
- Louise Viau, A.V.A., Pl.Fin., B.A.A. (2004-2006);
- Norman Caty, Pl.Fin. (2006-February 22, 2008);
- Clément Blais (Feb 22, 2008-2009);
- Stéphane Prévost (2009-2010);
- Dany Bergeron, B.A.A., A.V.A., C.A.A.S., FMA, FCSI (June 2011-2014);
- Lyne Gagné, Pl.Fin. (June 2014-2017);
- André Di Vita (2017- ).

== CSF outstanding Awards ==
Winners of the outstanding awards given by the CSF since 2008 are
Year	Award of Excellence	Succession Award	Career Award
2008	Sylvain De Champlain, A.V.A., Pl.Fin.	Dominic Durant	
2009	Dominic Paquette, B.Sc., Pl.Fin.	Jean-Sébastien Gilbert	
2010	Patrick Charlebois, B.A.A., FCSI	Hugo Lehoux, H.B.Commerce, Pl.Fin.	
2011	Kaddis R. Sidaros, A.V.A., Pl.Fin.	Mathieu Marcil, Pl.Fin.	
2012	Élaine Saint-Onge, M. Fisc., Pl.Fin., A.V.A., LL.B.	Alain Parent, A.V.C., Pl.Fin.	
2013	Sophie Babeux, MBA	Guillaume Parent, B.A.A.	Jacques Chabot, A.V.A., Pl.Fin.
2014	Dominique Asselin, B.A.A., Pl.Fin., FCSI	Marc-Antoine Mainville, B.A.A.	Robert A. Faust, A.V.A.
2015	Francine Lavallée	Hugo Neveu and David Truong	Kaddis Sidaros
2016	Sussy Galvez	Maxime Gauthier	Gilles Garon and Gaétan Veillette, B.A.A., F.Adm.A., Pl.Fin.
2017	Christine Lengvari	Marc-Étienne Legault Salvail	Claude Paquin

Note: The 2016 Future Prize (French: Prix Avenir) was awarded to Marie-Philip Babineau and Racky Fayol N'Diaye; and in 2017 to Mak Vaillancourt. This distinguished awards program was discontinued after that of 2017.

"Association des intermédiaires en assurance de personnes du Québec" (AIAPQ)

== Winner of the outstanding awards given by the AIAPQ Trophé Victor Dumais ==
In 1996 Kamal G. Lutfi A.V.C. Pl.Fin. President of Laval Chapter (third largest Chapter), President of the Board of all Presidents 20 Chapters in Quebec, Provincial Administrator in 1997

The Trophé Victor Dumais is the highest Award for Excellency and Accomplishment in the Life Insurance Industry. It is measured by the efficiency and participation of its members plus Education seminars and fund raising activities.

== Members ==
Its members are:

1. Financial security advisors(i.e. representatives in insurance of persons);
2. Group insurance representatives;
3. Representative of mutual fund dealer;
4. Representatives of Scholarship plan broker, and;
5. Financial planners who are not regulated by an authorized Professional Order.

For example, the "Chambre de la sécurité financière" (Chamber of Financial Security) brings together all professionals in the Quebec financial sector (except: securities representatives) with its counterpart, the Chambre de l'assurance de dommages (Québec) (Chamber of Damage Insurance), whose members are "damage insurance agents", "damage insurance brokers" and claims adjusters.

== Compulsory continuing education ==
The CSF supervises the compulsory continuous training of its subjects in the disciplines it supervises, in particular by:

- The administration of its register of continuing education units (UFC);
- Accreditation of continuing education activities offered to training providers;
- Its offer a large range of training activities in meeting room or through Internet.

Historically, the CSF has been innovative in terms of training its members. It also provides in-company training on request. Training focuses on compliance and on the various disciplines under supervision. Internet training activities have become very popular.

== Disciplinary Committee ==
The "Discipline Committee" shall hear any complaint made by the trustee against a representative. Complaints may come from a consumer or from any representative of the CSF. For example, a consumer who feels aggrieved or a representative of unethical practices may apply directly to the CSF or to the Information Center of the Autorité des marchés financiers.

== See also ==
- Autorité des marchés financiers (Quebec) (AMF)
- Chambre de l'assurance de dommages (Québec) (CAD)
- Institut québécois de planification financière (IQPF)
