= Madeleine Plamondon =

Canadian politician and consumer advocate

The Hon. Madeleine Plamondon

Senator for The Laurentides, Quebec
- In office 2003–2006
- Appointed by: Jean Chrétien
- Preceded by: Raymond Setlakwe
- Succeeded by: Michel Rivard

Personal details
- Born: September 21, 1931 (age 95) Warwick, Quebec, Canada
- Party: Independent

Madeleine Plamondon (born September 21, 1931) is a Canadian retired Senator and consumer advocate specializing in financial services, privacy, and rights of the elderly.

She has headed the Service d'aide au consommateur in Shawinigan, Quebec, since its foundation in 1974 and has also been active with the Financial Services OmbudsNetwork, the Bureau des services financiers (Quebec) and the Association des courtiers et agents immobiliers du Québec.

In September 2003, Plamondon was appointed to the Senate by Prime Minister Jean Chrétien who is a fellow resident of Shawinigan. She sits as an independent Senator. She retired from the Upper House on September 21, 2006, when she attained the mandatory retirement age of 75.
