= Financial planner =

Professional who prepares financial plans for people

A financial planner or personal financial planner is a qualified financial advisor. Practicing in full service personal finance, they advise clients on investments, insurance, tax, retirement and estate planning.

As a general rule, a financial planner’s work can:

- integrate into the range of professional services (eg: lawyer, accountant); or
- integrate into the offer of a range of financial products and services (eg: financial advisor, insurance agent); or
- not be integrated into other products or services, providing stand alone financial planning.

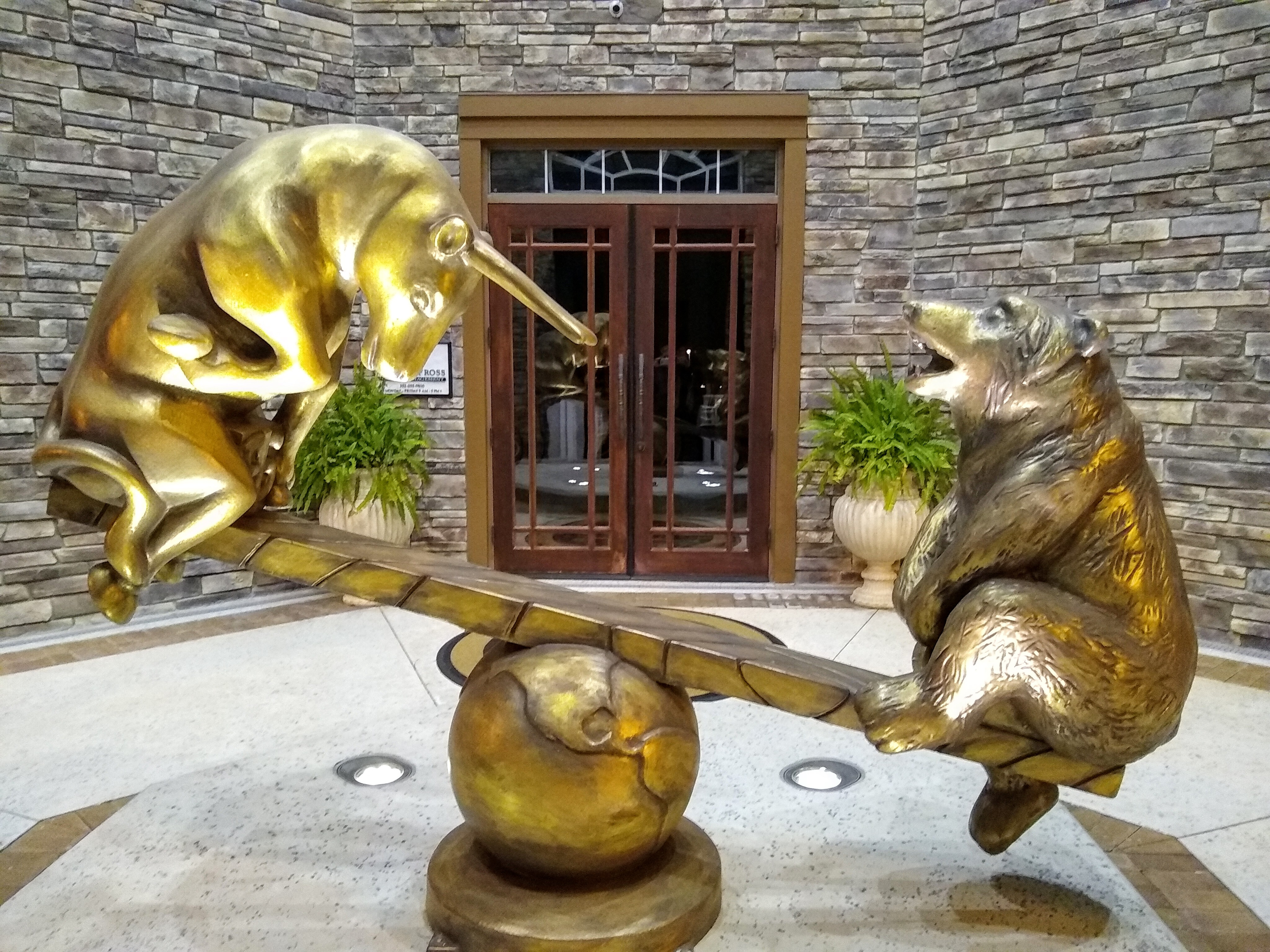
Sculpture of bull and bear on seesaw in front of Fross and Fross Wealth Management office in The Villages, Florida.

== Scope ==
Financial planning should cover all areas of the client's financial needs and should result in the achievement of each of the client's goals as required. The scope of planning would usually include the following:

- Risk management and insurance planning: managing cash flow risks through sound risk management and insurance techniques
- Investment and planning issues: planning, creating and managing capital accumulation to generate future capital and cash flows for reinvestment and spending, including managing for risk-adjusted returns and to deal with inflation
- Retirement planning: planning to ensure financial independence at retirement including 401Ks, IRAs etc.
- Tax planning: planning for the reduction of tax liabilities and the freeing-up of cash flows for other purposes
- Estate planning: planning for the creation, accumulation, conservation and distribution of assets
- Cash flow and liability management: maintaining and enhancing personal cash flows through debt and lifestyle management

== Process ==
The personal financial planning process is described in ISO 22222:2005 as consisting of six steps:

1. Establishing and defining the client and personal financial planner relationship
2. Gathering client data and determining goals and expectations
3. Analysing and evaluating the client's financial status
4. Developing and presenting the financial plan
5. Implementing the financial planning recommendations
6. Monitoring the financial plan and the financial planning relationship

== Licensing, regulations and self-regulation ==
In many countries, there are no requirements (no legal framework) regarding the use of the title of 'financial planner'.

The scope of the title "financial planner" varies from one jurisdiction to another. The legal framework of the profession may include:

- a reserved title (eg: PFA-certified financial planner, CFP, financial planner): the protection of the title ensures that the services are provided by accredited persons meeting ethical standards;
- reserved activities: as a general rule, the asset planning activity is shared between several professions;
- compulsory basic and continuing training: the training requirements of financial planners ensure updating of skills;
- professional liability insurance;
- a compensation fund;
- a supervised service offer;
- supervised instrumentation;
- an obligation of written mandate before delivering a professional service.

=== Australia ===
In Australia, financial advisors must be authorised under an Australian Financial Services licence holder to provide financial product advice. The licence holder must obtain a licence from the Australian Securities and Investments Commission (ASIC). The ASIC website states that "Holding an AFS licence does not provide a guarantee of the probity or quality of the licensee's services."

There has been recent reforms to the licensing of financial advisors in Australia as a result of several scandals involving things such as inadequate or improper advice and fees charged to clients for no service. From 1 January 2019, new education and training standards apply to financial advisers these standards include undertaking approved post graduate study, passing a national accredited examination and undertaking continuing professional education. New entrants to the industry have additional requirements.

=== Belgium ===
In Belgium, advice in this area is regulated by the law of 25 April 2014 relating to the status and control of independent financial planners and to the provision of planning consultations by regulated companies. Notaries, lawyers, accountants and auditors are however not targeted. The law uses the term "financial planning", which creates an amalgamation between two disciplines.

=== Canada ===
Regulation of the title “Financial Planner” in Canada varies by province. Québec has long maintained the most stringent framework: only individuals certified by the Institut québécois de planification financière (IQPF) and licensed by the Autorité des marchés financiers (AMF) may use the title Planificateur financier (Pl. Fin.).

Outside Québec, title regulation has expanded significantly in recent years. In Ontario, the Financial Professionals Title Protection Act, administered by the Financial Services Regulatory Authority of Ontario (FSRA), restricts the use of the titles Financial Planner and Financial Advisor to individuals who hold an approved credential from an FSRA‑approved credentialing body. Saskatchewan has passed similar legislation under the Financial Planners and Financial Advisors Act, establishing a comparable title protection framework.

Under Ontario’s framework, several credentials qualify an individual to use the title Financial Planner, including the Certified Financial Planner (CFP) and Qualified Associate Financial Planner (QAFP) designations from FP Canada, the Chartered Life Underwriter (CLU) from the Institute for Advanced Financial Education, the Personal Financial Planner (PFP) credential from the Canadian Securities Institute, the Registered Retirement Consultant (RRC) designation from the Canadian Institute of Financial Planning and the Registered Financial Planner (R.F.P.) designation from the Institute of Advanced Financial Planners. These credentials require education, examinations, continuing education, and adherence to professional standards.

Although many financial advisors in Canada offer planning‑related services, only individuals holding an approved credential may legally use the title Financial Planner in Ontario and Québec. Other provinces do not currently regulate the title, though several are reviewing potential frameworks.

==== Quebec ====
The title of financial planner (F.P.) or planificateur financier (Pl.Fin.) is a professional title used in Quebec (Canada). This Quebec title applies to a person who graduated from the Institut québécois de planification financière program and then supervised by a regulatory body authorized by provincial law: the Chambre de la sécurité financière, the Ordre des administrateurs agréés du Québec or the Ordre professionnel des comptables professionnels agréés du Québec (lit. 'Professional Order of Chartered Professional Accountants of Quebec'). At the end of his basic training, the financial planner is qualified to exercise the activity of “financial planning” of the asset type.

In Quebec, this title is granted by the regulatory bodies that oversee this professional practice, namely the AMF (Autorité des marchés financiers) and the Participating professional orders: Ordre des administrateurs agréés du Québec and the Ordre professionnel des comptables professionnels agréés du Québec.

=== Malaysia ===
The Securities Commission Malaysia introduced legislation through amendments made to the Securities Industry Act in 2003 to regulate financial planning and the use of the title or related-title of 'financial planner' or to conduct activities related to financial planning.

In 2005, amendments to the Malaysian Insurance Act require those who carry out financial advisory business (including financial planning activities related to insurance) and/or use the title of financial adviser under their firm (which, like in Singapore, must be a corporate structure) to obtain a license from Bank Negara Malaysia (BNM). Some persons who offer financial advisory services, e.g., licensed life insurance agents, are exempted from licensing as a practising requirement.

=== Singapore ===
In Singapore, financial services are highly regulated by The Monetary Authority of Singapore (MAS), the regulator and supervisor of financial institutions in Singapore. Rules are set by MAS for financial institutions and are implemented through legislation, regulations, directions and notices. Currently, the majority of the financial planners (financial consultants) are commission-based, which may cause a conflict of interest related to the products recommended. In 2015, a balanced scorecard framework was implemented to better align the interests of the FA industry and consumers. This ensures FA representatives and supervisors meet key performance indicators that are not related to sales, such as providing suitable product recommendations and making proper disclosure of material information to customers (Non-Sales KPI). Failure to achieve good grades for the Non-Sales KPI will directly affect their commission (variable income).

=== New Zealand ===
The Financial Markets Authority (FMA) (formerly the Securities Commission) provides Authorisation to individuals who provide Personalised Financial Advice, Investment Planning Services and/or Discretionary Investment Management Services. Individuals who receive authorisation are referred to as an Authorised Financial Adviser (AFA). In order to receive authorisation, individuals must complete the National Certificate in Financial Services (Financial Advice) (Level 5).

== See also ==
- Registered investment advisor
- Certified Financial Planner
- Chartered Financial Planner
- Family planning
- Professional Financial Advisor
- Financial adviser
- Financial plan
- Financial planning (business)
- Life planning
- Discretionary investment management
- Professional certification in financial services § Financial planning
- Wealth management
