= Raymond Setlakwe =

Canadian politician (1928–2021)

Raymond C. Setlakwe CM

Senator for The Laurentides
- In office 20 June 2000 – 3 July 2003
- Appointed by: Jean Chrétien
- Preceded by: Arthur Tremblay
- Succeeded by: Madeleine Plamondon

Personal details
- Born: 3 July 1928 Thetford Mines, Quebec, Canada
- Died: 14 October 2021 (aged 93) Thetford Mines, Quebec, Canada
- Party: Liberal
- Children: Michelle Setlakwe

Raymond C. Setlakwe, CM (3 July 1928 – 14 October 2021) was a Canadian entrepreneur, lawyer and senator.

== Biography ==
Born in Thetford Mines, Quebec, of Armenian descent, Setlakwe graduated from Bishop's College School and received a Bachelor of Arts from Bishop's University and an L.L.L from Université Laval in Quebec. He was summoned to the Senate in 2000 on the advice of Jean Chrétien and represented the senatorial division of The Laurentides, Quebec. He was a member of the Liberal caucus and retired at the age of 75 in 2003. In 1996, he was made a Member of the Order of Canada. On 4 June 2016, the Lieutenant Governor of Quebec, J. Michel Doyon, presented Setlakwe with the prestigious ‘Outstanding Merit” medal, due to his professional background and his extensive involvement in various social causes in the Thetford area.

Setlakwe played a role in the Canadian recognition of the Armenian genocide, taking on the cause in the Senate, culminating in the June 2002 recognition of the upper house. The Senator stated: "Humanity is far from being safe from a repetition of this massacre. Therefore, it is all the more important that the genocide be recognized," he added, "Africa and many other places in the world are threatened by this sort of barbaric behaviour." He died on 14 October 2021, aged 93 at a hospital in Thetford Mines.

His niece Michelle Setlakwe was elected to the National Assembly of Quebec in the 2022 Quebec general election.
