= Chartered Institute of Taxation =

UK professional body

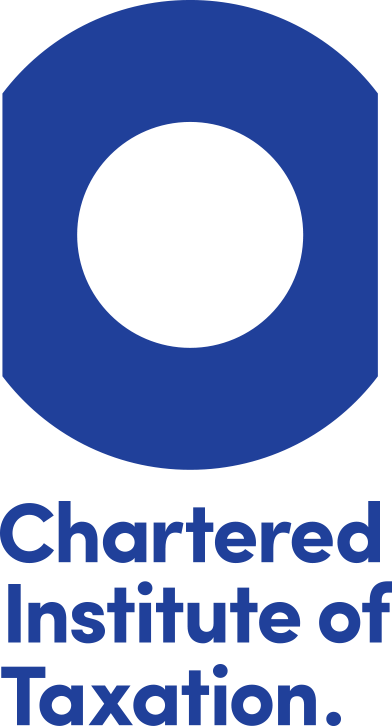
- Abbreviation: CIOT
- Predecessor: Chartered Institute of Taxation
- Formation: 1930; 96 years ago
- Legal status: Chartered body
- Headquarters: London, United Kingdom
- Members: 20,000
- President: Nichola Ross Martin
- Deputy President: Paul Aplin
- Vice-President: John Barnett
- Students: 11,000 students (CTA, ATT-CTA and ADIT)
- Website: tax.org.uk

The Chartered Institute of Taxation (CIOT) is a registered charity and the leading professional body in the United Kingdom concerned solely with taxation. The CIOT deals with all aspects of direct and indirect taxation.

== Activities ==
The primary purpose of the CIOT is to promote education in and the study of the administration and practice of taxation. One of its key aims is to achieve a better, more efficient, tax system for all affected by it – taxpayers, advisers and the authorities. The CIOT's comments and recommendations on tax issues are made solely in order to achieve its aims: it is entirely apolitical in its work.

The CIOT administers and awards three qualifications: the CTA (Chartered Tax Adviser) qualification for domestic tax practitioners in the United Kingdom, the ADIT (the Advanced Diploma in International Taxation) for international tax professionals around the world and the DITT (Diploma in Tax Technology), which was introduced in November 2022.

== Membership ==
Membership is awarded on passing the Institute's CTA examinations and completing three years' practical taxation experience. Members may use the letters CTA (Chartered Tax Adviser), formerly ATII (Associate of the Taxation Institute Incorporated). Members who joined before the change in designatory letters to CTA may continue to use ATII if they wish. The CIOT describes its qualifications as the 'gold standard'. Fellowship is available following the submission of a thesis or a body of work. Fellow members may use the letters CTA (Fellow), formerly FTII, after their name to indicate fellowship.

Since 2014, the CIOT and Institute of Chartered Accountants in England and Wales (ICAEW) have offered the ACA/CTA Joint Programme, a combined route which allows tax students to achieve both prestigious qualifications in a shorter length of time.

== Foundation ==
The Institute of Taxation (the forerunner of the Chartered Institute) was formed in 1930, incorporated as a Company Limited by Guarantee. The Chartered Institute is incorporated by Royal Charter. One of the founder members was Ronald Staples, the founding editor of Taxation Magazine. It was originally proposed to use the letters ATI (Associate of the Taxation Institute) and FTI (Fellow of the Taxation Institute). When it was discovered that these letters had already been allocated to the Textiles Institute, an extra "I" was added to each set of letters, standing for "Incorporated".

== Affiliations ==
The Institute was the first UK tax body to join the Confédération Fiscale Européenne (CFE).

The 500 members of the Institute of Indirect Taxation (IIT) became members of the CIOT in August 2012 following the memberships of both bodies approving the merger of the two bodies at separate meetings in May 2012.

== Partnerships ==
- The CIOT owns a significant collection of taxation-related literature which is held in King's College London's Maughan Library and is made available to both CIOT and King's College members.
- Although an independent organization, the CIOT shares back-office services with the Association of Taxation Technicians.

== Arms ==
Coat of arms of Chartered Institute of Taxation
Escutcheon Azure a garb Or charged with a saltire couped Gules a chief chequy of the last and second.
