= Advanced Diploma in International Taxation =

Professional credential

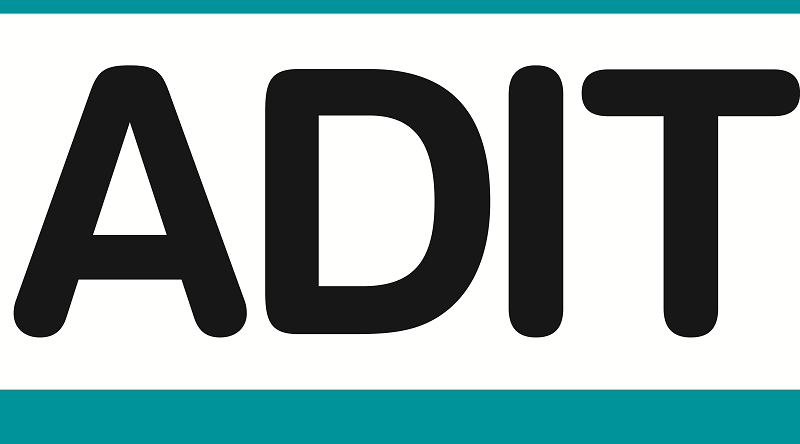
- Abbreviation: ADIT
- Headquarters: London, United Kingdom
- Website: www.tax.org.uk/adit

ADIT (the Advanced Diploma in International Taxation) is a professional qualification and credential, offered globally by the UK-based Chartered Institute of Taxation (CIOT) to international tax professionals.

As of August 2021, there were more than 5,000 ADIT students, graduates and International Tax Affiliates in approximately 120 countries. The biggest employers of ADIT professionals are the “Big Four”, major international law firms, industry and commerce, and revenue authorities.

A candidate who successfully completes ADIT is awarded the ADIT credential. Candidates who wish to adhere to professional requirements by retaining an ongoing link with the CIOT can apply to become an International Tax Affiliate of the Chartered Institute of Taxation. This subscription package entitles the Affiliate to a number of benefits and resources, including the right to use the letters 'ADIT' after their name, discounts and priority access for online CIOT events, and access to the CIOT’s international branch network.

Affiliates are able to demonstrate their commitment to high standards of ethical and professional behaviour by adhering to the ADIT Code of Conduct.

== Governance ==
The standard of the ADIT credential is overseen and evaluated by an Academic Board of leading international tax academics, to ensure a high standard of technical rigour. The following members comprise the Academic Board:

- Philip Baker QC OBE (University of Oxford)
- Prof. Rita de la Feria (University of Leeds)
- Malcolm Gammie QC CBE (London School of Economics)
- Prof. Ruth Mason (University of Virginia)
- Prof. Zhu Qing (Renmin University of China)
- Prof. Diane Ring (Boston College)
- Prof. Dr Luís Eduardo Schoueri (University of São Paulo)
- Dr Partho Shome (Ministry of Finance, Government of India)
- Prof. Dr Kees Van Raad (University of Leiden)
- Jefferson VanderWolk (Squire Patton Boggs)
- Prof. Richard Vann (University of Sydney)

Academic Board meetings are chaired by Jim Robertson (UN Subcommittee on Extractive Industries Taxation).

The ADIT exams are widely considered to be technically rigorous, with demanding pass requirements for each of the three examinations. Successful candidates take an average of two to three years to earn their ADIT credential. ADIT covers a broad range of topics relating to the OECD Model Convention, double tax treaties, a select number of countries’ international tax regimes, Transfer Pricing, the cross-border taxation of the banking and energy sectors, and transnational tax issues relating to the EU.

== Qualification structure ==
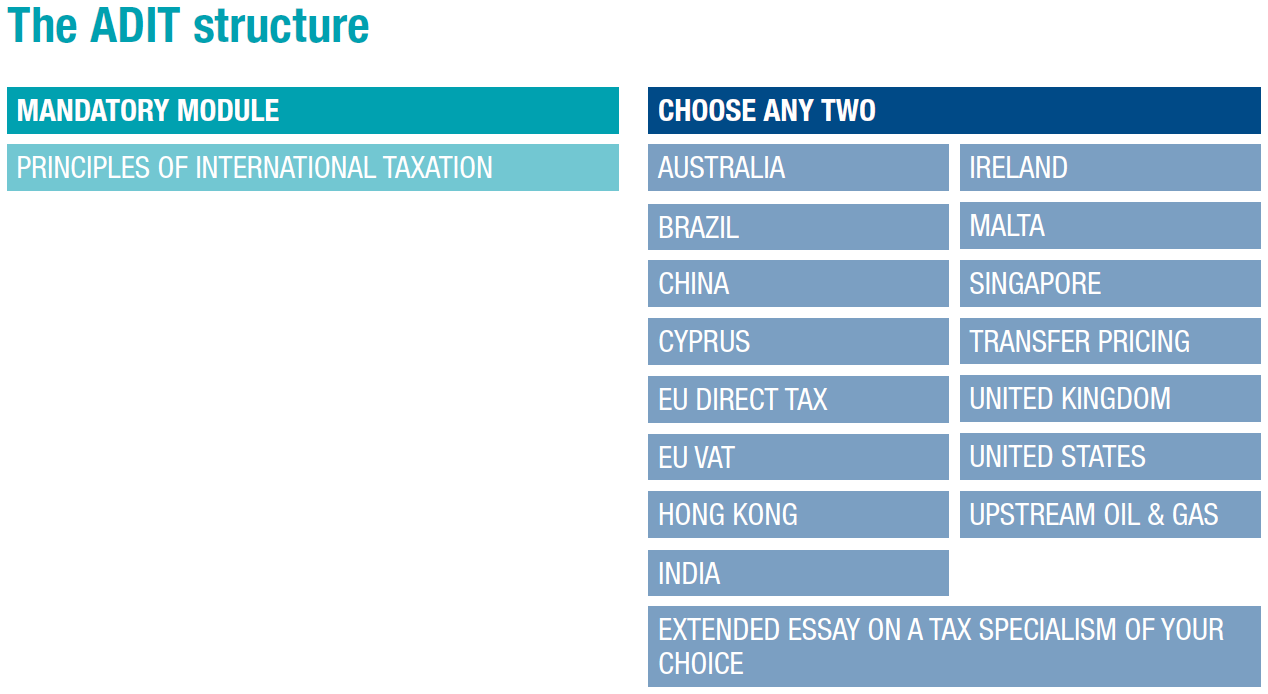
The ADIT qualification structure (click to enlarge)

The ADIT qualification structure includes a mandatory 'Principles of International Taxation' exam, which covers fundamental concepts in international tax. In addition, students are required to select two further exams, from a range of jurisdiction-based and thematic international tax subject areas. The ADIT qualification structure was changed to its present form in 2015.

ADIT exam sessions are organised twice per year, with exams taking place in June and December. Students who complete their final exam during each session receive an ADIT certificate. Students may sit ADIT exams remotely, anywhere in the world. Since 2014, ADIT students have been able to sit their exams electronically, using a purpose-built on-screen exam application installed on their own laptop devices.

Sponsored medals and prizes are awarded to students achieving the highest marks in each ADIT exam session. These awards include the Tom O'Shea Prize, the Heather Self Medal, the Raymond Kelly Medal, the Wolters Kluwer Prize, and the Worshipful Company of Tax Advisers Medal.

In addition to the ADIT certificate issued upon achievement of the full ADIT qualification, standalone certificates are also available for students who complete either the 'Module 1 Principles of International Taxation', 'Module 3.01 EU Direct Tax option, 'Module 3.02 EU VAT option', 'Module 3.03 Transfer Pricing option', 'Module 3.04 Upstream Oil and Gas option' or 'Module 3.05 Banking option' exam. A modular certificate is available to any ADIT student who has passed the exams for both Module 1 Principles of International Taxation and one option module.

== See also ==
- International taxation
