= Aleksandar Ivanovski =

Macedonian lawyer

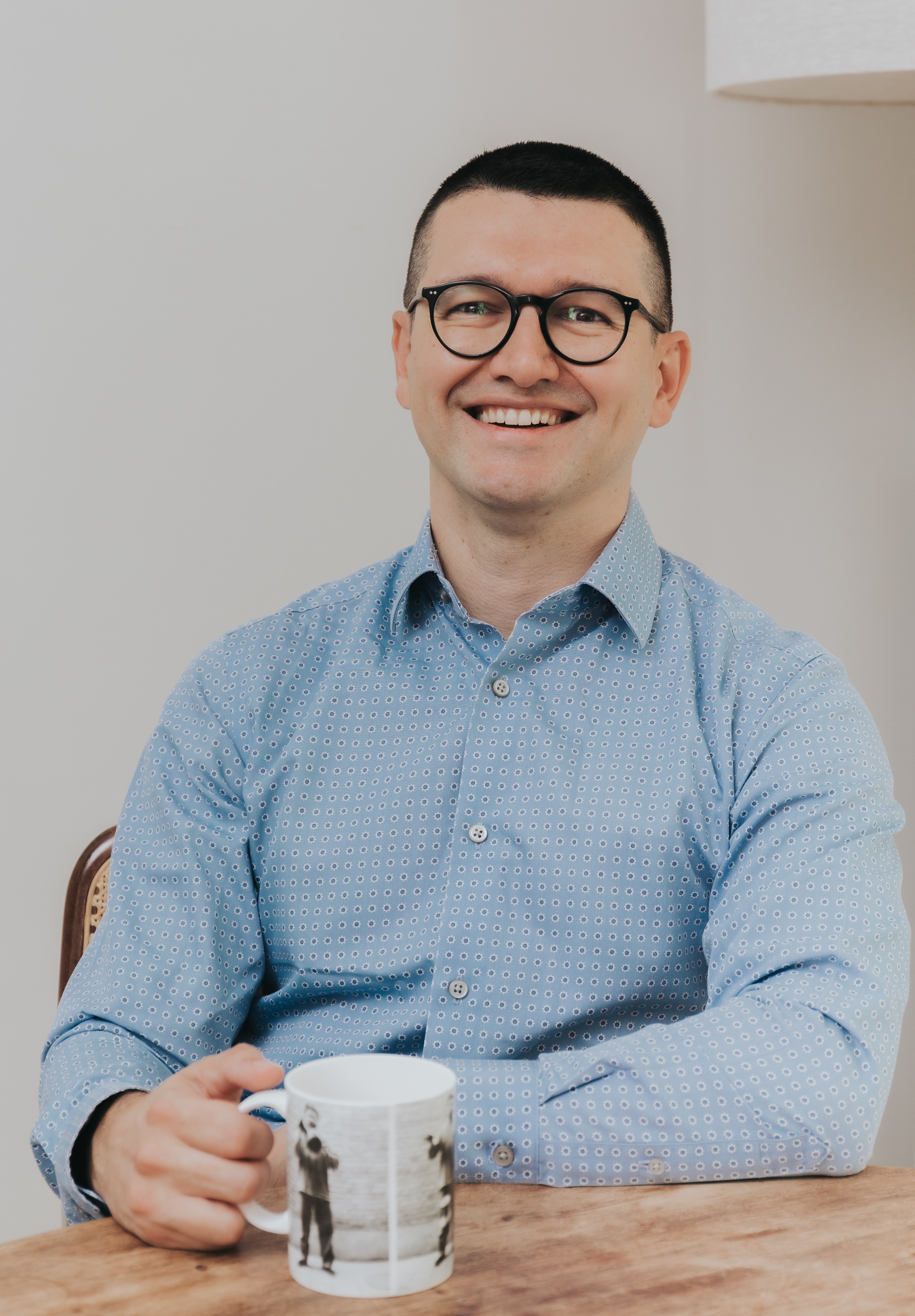
- Aleksandar Ivanovski in 2022
- Born: 23 June 1981 (age 45); Skopje, Yugoslavia
- Education: University of Amsterdam, Queen Mary University of London
- Occupations: lawyer, EU expert

Aleksandar Ivanovski (Macedonian: Александар Ивановски) is a Belgian - Macedonian lawyer academic and EU legal expert.

Ivanovski introduced the phrase “grey zone” used in European tax policy.

== Education and career ==
Ivanovski studied law at Ss. Cyril and Methodius University of Skopje. He holds an LLM degree from the University of Amsterdam and a PhD from Queen Mary University of London on the principle of equal treatment in EU tax and State aid law.

Ivanovski serves as director of CFE Tax Advisers Europe. He previously worked as tax inspector.

== European tax policy ==
Ivanovski’s academic research is centered around tax and EU State aid rules, specifically the way State aid rules apply to individual tax deals by national authorities. He is a frequent commentator on European tax rulings, such as Apple's EU tax dispute, on VAT and tax fraud as well as questions of tax transparency, such as de:Public Country-by-Country-Reporting.

Advising on the prospective accession of his home country North Macedonia to the EU, Ivanovski insisted on the importance of transparency in providing state subsidies to companies and on committing to sustainable investment policies.

== Ethics for tax advisors ==
Ivanovski is a member of the European Commission Platform for Tax Good Governance, as independent expert on tax policy. He represents CFE Tax Advisers Europe in discussions on sustainable green transition.

In 2022, Ivanovski coined the phrase “grey zone” in the conversation on the need to regulate the tax advisors’ profession. He put forward that it would not be sufficient for the European Union to outlaw blatantly illegal misconduct because tax planning takes place in such grey zones. Ivanovski raised the question of important national differences within the EU in the attitude of citizens to tax. He has been advocating in favor of ethical standards to be set for the tax advisors’ profession and to be included in the university program forming tax advisors.
