= Office des professions du Québec =

The Office des professions du Québec, abbreviated to abbreviation OPQ, is an autonomous and extrabudgetary governmental organization with a defined mandate by the Professional Code of Quebec. The OPQ reports to the Minister of Justice, who is, by Order in Council, the Minister responsible for the administration of professional legislation. The OPQ is a Quebec body responsible for ensuring that the professions are exercised and develop by offering the public a guarantee of competence and integrity.

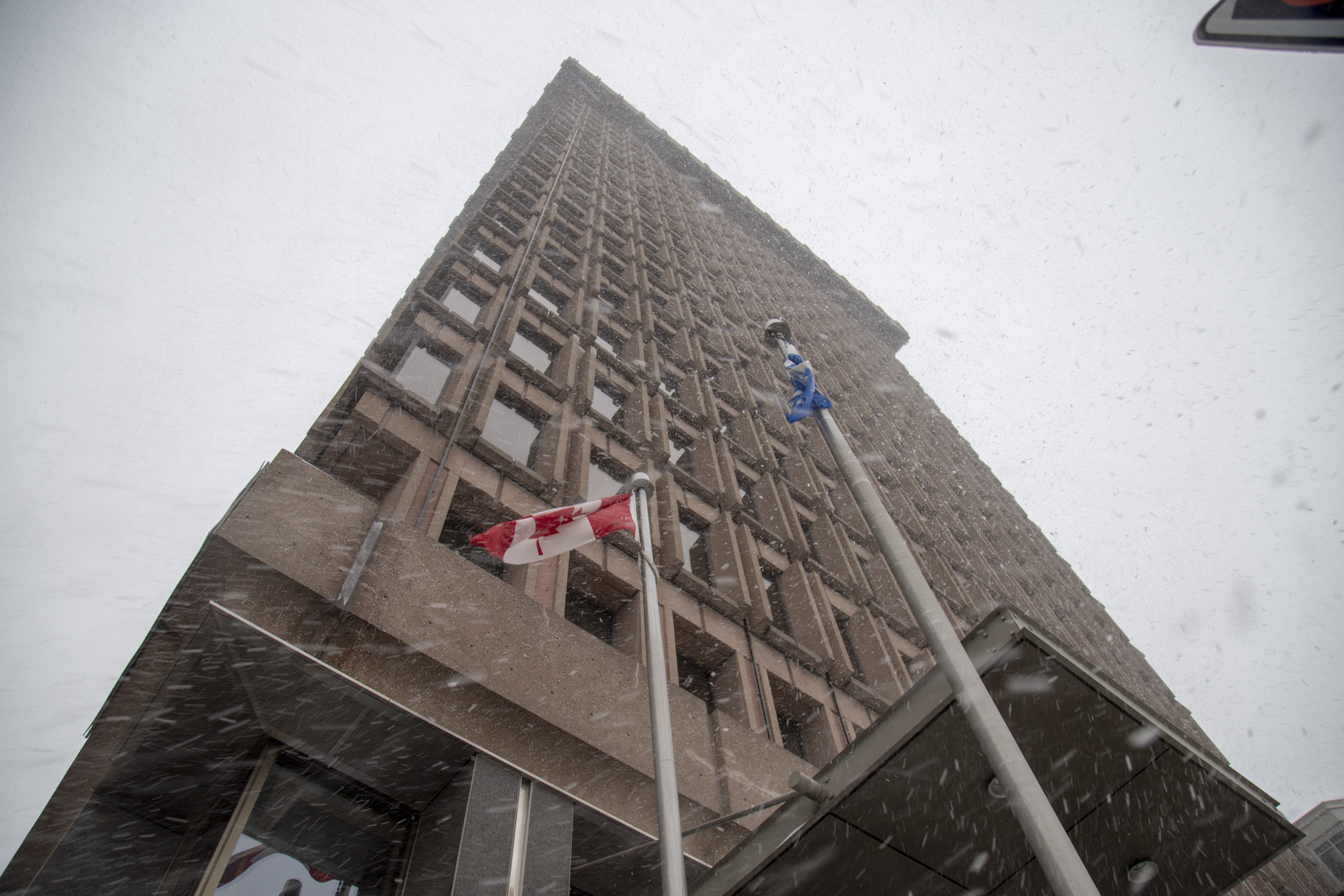
An Office des professions du Québec building in Quebec City.

In 2017, the "Office des professions du Québec" supervises 46 professional orders and 54 professions. As of March 31, 2016, OPQ is composed of 385 205 professionals, including 39.0% of men and 61.0% of women. The "Ordre des infirmières et des infirmiers du Québec" (English: Order of Nurses of Quebec) (OIIQ) had 74,206 members, the "Ordre des ingénieurs du Québec" (English: Engineers Order of Quebec) (OIQ) 62,068 members and the "Ordre des comptables professionnels agréés du Québec" (English: Order of Chartered Professional Accountants of Quebec) (OCPAQ) 37,963 members.

The financing of the OPQ's expenses is assumed by the individual annual contributions fixed by the government and collected by the orders from their members.

== Organization Chart ==
The Board of Directors of the OPQ is composed of five members. The mandate of the Board is defined by section 12 of the Professional Code of Quebec (RLRQ, c. C-26). Since August 27, 1999, members of the Board have been subject to a code of ethics and professional deontology.

The OPQ's services are based on the following administrative units: the Office of the President, the Legal Affairs Directorate, the Research and Analysis Directorate and the Administrative Services Directorate. Finally, the Professional Code of Quebec established the position of Complaints Commissioner with respect to the mechanisms for the recognition of professional competencies and the Office of the Chairpersons of the Disciplinary Councils of the professional orders.

== Mission of the OPQ ==
The OPQ ensures that each professional order ensures the protection of the public. This mission is exercised through the supervision of the exercise of professions and their development, offering the public guarantees of competence and integrity. Together with the Ordre and the Conseil Interprofessionnel du Québec (CIQ), the OPQ contributes to building public and institutional confidence in the professional system.

In summary, to carry out its mission, the OPQ:

- Makes sure the Professional Orders have the appropriate means to carry out their mandate;
- Advises the Quebec government on the guidelines for the continuous improvement of the professional system;
- Ensures that the legal framework for the professional system is adapted;
- Promotes the effectiveness of the mechanisms established within the "Professional Orders";
- See that the public is informed and represented in the "Professional Orders".

The Agency, a government agency striving for excellence, promotes innovation, creativity, human resource development and teamwork. In consultation with its partners, the Office seeks coherence in its work.

== Professions subject to OPQ ==
The Professional Code of Quebec (French: "Code des professions du Québec") establishes two types of professions: those of exclusive exercise and those reserved. In the case of a profession of exclusive exercise, only the members of the order can carry out the activities and carry the title that the law reserves to them. The Government of Quebec has established 25 professional laws which give members of specific professions the exclusive right to carry out their exclusive activities.

Exclusive professions each have their own law which defines, among other things, professional activities that are strictly reserved for the members of the Order.

Furthermore, only members of the professions on a reserved basis have the right to use the professional title. However, members of a reserved Order are not exclusively engaged in professional activities, with the exception of certain occupations in the health field.

Roles of Professional Orders

The main role of each of the professional orders subject to the supervision of the OPQ is to: ensure, in their specific field, that professionals offer services that meet standards of quality and integrity of the profession . In order to fulfill the important statutory mandate, each professional order has a number of powers that provide guarantees for the protection of the public and ensure the quality of professional services. The role of a professional association is rather to promote the socio-economic interests and well-being of its members.

The roles and responsibilities of the professional orders are:

1. Control the competence and integrity of its members;
2. Monitoring the practice of the profession;
3. Regulate the practice of the profession;
4. Manage the disciplinary process;
5. Promote the development of the profession;
6. Control the illegal practice of the profession and the usurpation of the title.

Each professional order is required to produce an annual report of its activities. This report shall be made public as soon as it is presented to the general meeting of members. The Minister responsible for the application of the professional laws then files this report with the National Assembly of Quebec.

== List of Professional Orders in Quebec ==
The 46 regulated Professional Orders and 54 professions in Quebec are:

Professional Order	French title	English title	Abbreviation
Ordre des acupuncteurs du Québec (Order of Acupuncturists of Quebec)	Acupunteur	Acupuncturist	Ac.
Ordre des Administrateurs Agréés du Québec (Order of Chartered Administrators of Quebec)	Administrateur agréé, conseiller en management certifié	Chartered Administrator, Certified Management Advisor	Adm.A., C.M.C., (C.Adm.)
Ordre des agronomes du Québec (Order of Agronomists of Quebec)	Agronome	Agrologist	
Ordre des architectes du Québec (Order of Architects of Quebec)	Architecte	Architect	
Ordre des arpenteurs-géomètres du Québec (Order of Quebec land surveyors)	Arpenteur-géomètre	Land Surveyor	
Ordre des audioprothésistes du Québec (order of Audioprosthetist of Quebec)	Audioprothésiste	Hearing-Aid Acoustician	
Barreau du Québec (The Barreau of Quebec)	Maître, avocat, conseiller en loi, conseiller juridique, membre du Barreau, avocat à la retraite, procureur	Advocate, solicitor, legal adviser, member of the Bar, retired advocate, attorney	Me, Mtre
Ordre des chimistes du Québec (Order of the chemists of Quebec)	Chimiste, chimiste professionnel	Chemist, Professional Chemist	
Ordre des chiropraticiens du Québec (Order of Chiropractors of Quebec)	Chiropraticien, docteur	Chiropractor, doctor	
Ordre des comptables professionnels agréés du Québec (Order of Chartered Professional Accountants of Quebec)	Comptable professionnel agréé ou ce titre suivi de l’un des suivants: comptable agréé, comptable général accrédité, comptable en management accrédité ou auditeur/auditrice, expert-comptable	Chartered Professional Accountant ou ce titre suivi de l’un des suivants : chartered accountant, certified general accountant, certified management accountant ou auditor professional accountant, public accountant	CPA; CPA, CA; CPA, CGA; CPA, CMA
Ordre des conseillers et conseillères d’orientation du Québec (Order of Guidance Counsellors of Quebec)	Conseiller d’orientation/conseillère d’orientation, orienteur professionnel, orienteur	Vocational Guidance Counsellor, Guidance Counsellor	C. O., C.O.P., O.P., (V.G.C.), (G.C.)
Ordre des conseillers en ressources humaines agréés du Québec (Order of Human Ressources Advisors of Quebec)	Conseiller en ressources humaines agréé, conseiller en relations industrielles agréé	Certified Human Resources Professional, Certified Industrial Relations Counsellor	C.R.I., C.R.I.A., C.R.H.A., (I.R.C.), (C.I.R.C.), (C.H.R.P.)
Ordre professionnel des criminologues du Québec (Professional Order of Criminologists of Quebec)	Criminologue	Criminologist	crim., (criminol.)
Ordre des dentistes du Québec (Order of dentists of Quebec)	Dentiste, docteur	Dentist, doctor	Dr
Ordre des denturologistes du Québec (Order of denturists of Quebec)	Denturologiste	Denturologist	
Ordre professionnel des diététistes du Québec (Professional Order of Dietitians of Quebec)	Diététiste, diététicien, nutritionniste	Dietician, dietitian, nutritionist	
Ordre des ergothérapeutes du Québec (Order of Occupational Therapists of Quebec)	Ergothérapeute	Occupational Therapist	erg., (O.T.), (O.T.R.)
Ordre des évaluateurs agréés du Québec (Order of Chartered Appraisers of Quebec)	Évaluateur agréé, estimateur agréé	Chartered Appraiser, Chartered Assessor	E.A., (C.App.)
Ordre des géologues du Québec (Order of Geologists of Quebec)	Géologue	Geologist	géo. (P. Geo.), géo.r., géo. stag. (GIT)
Chambre des huissiers de justice du Québec (Chamber of Judicial Officers of Quebec)	Huissier, huissier de justice	Baillif, court bailiff	
Ordre des hygiénistes dentaires du Québec (College of Dental Hygienists of Quebec)	Hygiéniste dentaire	Dental Hygienist	H.D., (D.H.), (R.D.H.)
Ordre des infirmières et infirmiers du Québec (Order of Nurses of Quebec)	Infirmière/infirmier	Nurse	
Ordre des infirmières et infirmiers auxiliaires du Québec (Order of Assistant Nurses of Quebec)	Infirmière auxiliaire/infirmier auxiliaire	Nursing Assistant, Licensed Practical Nurse	inf. aux., I.A., I.A.D., I.A.L., (n. ass’t), (L.P.N.), (N.A.), (R.N.A.)
Ordre des ingénieurs du Québec (Order of engineers of Quebec)	Ingénieur	Engineer	
Ordre des ingénieurs forestiers du Québec (Order of forester engineers of Quebec)	Ingénieur forestier	Forest engineer	
Ordre professionnel des inhalothérapeutes du Québec (Professional Order of Quebec Respiratory Therapists	Inhalothérapeute, technicien en inhalothérapie et anesthésie	Registered Respiratory Therapist, Technician in Inhalation Therapy and Anesthesia	Inh.,(R.R.T.)
Collège des médecins du Québec (College of Doctors of Quebec)	Médecin, docteur	Physician, doctor	Dr
Ordre des médecins vétérinaires du Québec (Order of Veterinarians of Quebec)	Médecin vétérinaire, docteur	Veterinary surgeon, doctor	Dr
Chambre des notaires du Québec (Chamber of Notaries of Quebec)	Notaire, conseiller juridique, notaire public, Maître	Notary, legal adviser, title attorney or notary public	Mtre, Me
Ordre des opticiens d’ordonnances du Québec (Order of Opticians of Quebec)	Opticien d’ordonnances, opticien	Dispensing optician, optician	
Ordre des optométristes du Québec (Order of Optometrists of Quebec)	Optométriste, docteur, docteur en optométrie	Optometrist, doctor, doctor in optometry	Dr
Ordre des orthophonistes et audiologistes du Québec (Order of Speech-Language Pathologists and Audiologists of Quebec)	Orthophoniste, Audiologiste	Speech Therapist, Speech-Language Pathologist, Audiologist	
Ordre des pharmaciens du Québec (Order of Pharmacists of Quebec)	Pharmacien, docteur	Pharmacist, doctor	
Ordre professionnel de la physiothérapie du Québec (Professional Order of Physiotherapy of Quebec)	Physiothérapeute, Thérapeute en réadaptation physique, thérapeute en physiothérapie, technicien en réadaptation physique/ technicienne en réadaptation physique, technicien en physiothérapie/technicienne en physiothérapie	Physiotherapist, Physical Therapist, Physical Rehabilitation Therapist, Physiotherapy Therapist, Physical Rehabilitation Technician, Physiotherapy Technician	pht, (P.T.); T.R.P., (P.R.T.)
Ordre des podiatres du Québec (Order of Podiatrists of Quebec)	Podiatre, docteur	Podiatrist, doctor	Dr
Ordre des psychoéducateurs et psychoéducatrices du Québec (Order of Psychoeducators of Quebec)	Psychoéducateur/psychoéducatrice	Psychoeducator	ps. éd., (Ps. Ed.)
Ordre des psychologues du Québec (Order of Psychologists of Quebec)	Psychologue, docteur, [titre réservé] psychothérapeute27	Psychologist, doctor, [reserved title] psychotherapist	Dr
Ordre des sages-femmes du Québec (Order of Midwives of Quebec)	Sage-femme	Midwife	
Ordre professionnel des sexologues du Québec (Order of Sexologists of Quebec)	Sexologue	Sexologist	
Ordre des techniciens et techniciennes dentaires du Québec (Order of Dental Technicians of Quebec)	Technicien dentaire, technicienne dentaire	Dental Technician	T.D., T.D.C., (D.T.), (C.D.T.)
Ordre professionnel des technologistes médicaux du Québec (Professional Order of Medical Technologists of Quebec)	Technologiste médical	Medical Technologist, Registered Technologist	tech.med., T.M., (M.T.), (R.T.)
Ordre des technologues en imagerie médicale, en radio-oncologie et en électrophysiologie médicale du Québec (Order of Medical Imaging, Medical Radiation Oncology and Medical Electrophysiology Technologists of Quebec)	Technologue en imagerie médicale, Technologue en radio-oncologie, Technologue en électrophysiologie médicale	Medical imaging technologist, Radiation oncology technologist, Medical electrophysiology technologist	
Ordre des technologues professionnels du Québec (Order of Professional Technologists of Quebec)	Technologue des sciences appliquées, technologue professionnel, technicien professionnel	Applied Sciences Technologist, Professional Technologist, Professional Technician	T.Sc.A., T.P., (A.Sc.T.), (P.T.)
Ordre des traducteurs, terminologues et interprètes agréés du Québec (Order of Certified Translators, Terminologists and Interpreters of Quebec)	Traducteur agréé/traductrice agree, terminologue agréé/terminologue agree, interprète agréé/interprète agréée	Certified Translator, Certified Terminologist, Certified Interpreter	trad.a., (C.Tr.); term.a., (C.Term.); int.a., (C.Int.)
Ordre des travailleurs sociaux et des thérapeutes conjugaux et familiaux du Québec (Order of Social Workers and Marriage and Family Therapists of Quebec)	Travailleur social/travailleuse sociale, thérapeute conjugal et familial/thérapeute conjugale et familiale, thérapeute conjugal/thérapeute conjugale, thérapeute familial/thérapeute familiale	Social worker, marriage and family therapist, marriage therapist, family therapist.	T.S.P., T.S., (P.S.W.), (S.W.) T.C.F., T.C., T.F., (M.F.T.), (M.T.), (F.T.)
Ordre des urbanistes du Québec (Order of town planners of Quebec)	Urbaniste	Urbanist, Town Planner, City Planner	urb.

== External administrators within professional orders ==
In accordance with the Professional Code of Quebec, the OPQ appoints between 2 and 4 directors outside the Board of Directors of each of the professional orders. These appointments are selected from a list of people registered at the nominating bank to represent the public. During fiscal year 2015-2016, 61% of these outside directors are not members of any professional order.

== History ==
In Quebec, professional corporations of notaries, doctors and lawyers were the first to be constituted in the mid-nineteenth century, at the beginning of the era of urbanization and industrialization of Quebec society. These initial clusters were designed to protect clients in the absence of training standards and professional practices. These groupings were also aimed at countering impostors improvising as experts, sharing expertise, developing instrumentation and establishing standards of professional practice.

During the 1960s and 1970s, members of several new professions aspired to be recognized and the legislations governing occupations were disparate, calling into question the professional supervision in Quebec. On November 9, 1966, the Lieutenant-Governor in Council set up a commission to examine the professional system, to investigate the whole field of health and social welfare in Quebec.

In a section of the report entitled "Professions and Society" published in the summer of 1970 on the very foundations of the notion of profession, the "Commission of Inquiry on Health and Welfare" (named "The Castonguay-Nepveu inquiry") noted the change in the liberal professions and mentioned the traditional professional corporatism which prevented it from adapting to economic and social transformations. The report recommends an important reorganization of the professional organization in Quebec beyond the scope of the health and social services professions. As a result of this report, in 1973, the Government of Quebec passed the "Professional Code" (Bill 250) and 23 other bills to govern an exclusive practice.

In July 1973, the articles of the Professional Code of Quebec relating to the Conseil Interprofessionnel du Québec (Quebec Interprofessional Council) entered into force and in September 1973 for the articles relating to the Office des professions du Québec. The majority of the other articles will be in force on 1 February 1974. Any Professional Order in operation on February 1, 1974 was to adopt a new regulation before February 1, 1975, adapted to the new professional legislation. As early as February 1974, the chairpersons of disciplinary committees were appointed to the committees that were in operation; the OPQ encourages orders to complete their discipline committee and to appoint their respective trustee. The delimitations of the electoral regions of the orders become linked to those of the administrative regions of Quebec.

The new Professional Code of Quebec subjected all orders to common organizational principles adapted to the conditions of contemporary society and to the current needs of users of professional services. From now on, the State may establish professional associations, in particular, by entrusting them with the mandate to protect the public with respect to certain activities that involve risks of harm to physical, psychological and patrimonial integrity. Each constituted order regulates and monitors the practice of professional activities.

Historically, in Quebec, most professional bodies have made the match between the interests of the members and the interest of the public. The adoption of the Professional Code of Quebec clearly gave professional corporations the mission of protecting the public in the practice of the profession. Furthermore, members'interests will be assured by professional associations. The legislator then provided for a periodic professional inspection mechanism. The mission of protecting the public assumed by the professional corporations was then divided into two parts:

- Ensure the quality of all professional services offered, by setting satisfactory qualification standards for candidates for professions and by controlling the integrity and competence of professionals by specific mechanisms;
- To ensure the availability and efficient distribution of the professional services required by the public.

Highlights

- 1973 - Creation of the OPQ and the CIQ.
- 1974 - During 1974-75, the OPQ appointed 114 directors representing the public to the Board of Professional Orders. From now on, the OPQ becomes attached to the Office at the "Ministère du Conseil executive", rather than at the "Ministère des Affaires sociales".
- 1975 - The OPQ publishes a first collection of the decisions rendered by the disciplinary committee of each of the professional orders and the "Tribunal des professions"; in the past this information was confidential. Adoption of approximately 600 regulations (since the adoption of the Professional Code of Quebec) by some fifteen professional bodies in the context of the reform of the professional system.
- 1994 - Significant amendments (Bill 140) have been made to the Professional Code of Quebec, including the revision of the disciplinary system, the relaxation of the regulatory process, the composition and powers of the Office, the powers vested in the government and the role of the CIQ. The Act sets out certain obligations of a professional to its clients, including sexual behavior and access to information contained in the records that the professional constitutes. The law now obliged each professional order to adopt a regulation on the professional liability insurance of its members who would henceforth have to take out an individual insurance policy, adhere to the contract of a collective plan concluded by the order, Subscribe to the insurance fund established by the order. The OPQ is now empowered by law to investigate orders that do not fulfill or could not fulfill the duties imposed on them by law. The OPQ is mandated to prepare and make available to the professional associations and the public documents and forms to assist in the exercise of remedies under the Act, including the request for an investigation and the private complaint to the Discipline Committee. Professional corporations become professional corporations.
- 1995 - Effective July 1, 1995, the provisions of Chapter 7 of Canada's Agreement on Internal Trade (AIT) to allow any worker qualified to practice a profession in a province (or territory) to have access to employment opportunities in this field in another provincial (or territorial) jurisdiction. Act 89 (1995, Chapter 50) introduces an annual membership fee to members of the professional orders to cover the expenses incurred by the OPQ, thereby transforming the OPQ into an extrabudgetary body retroactive to April 1, 1995.
- 1998 - Entry into force of an amendment to the Professional Code of Quebec relating to the new rules on the merger and integration of groups to existing professional orders by decrees rather than through the introduction of new regulations (1998, c.14) instead of a law.
- 1999 - As of March 31, 1999, the Québec professional framework included 589 regulations applicable to the 43 professional orders governed by the Professional Code of Quebec.
- 2001 - Under Law 169, the right of professionals to incorporate their practice is adopted, subject to the adoption of a regulation on the incorporation of professionals by their respective Professional Order. The first regulation to come into force on the exercise of the profession as a corporation is that of the "Ordre des comptables agrees" du Québec, in 2003.
- 2001 - New sharing of professional fields of practice in the field of health and activities now reserved for doctors, pharmacists, nurses, radiology technologists, dieticians, speech therapists and audiologists, physiotherapists, occupational therapists, nursing assistants, medical technologists and respiratory therapists; the bill authorizes professionals other than physicians, including nurses, to perform certain medical activities.
- 2009 - Establishment of the position of Complaints Commissioner, concerning the mechanisms for recognizing professional competencies under the responsibility of Quebec professional associations. The first incumbent, Me André Gariépy, took office on 27 July 2010.

== Personalities in the management of the professional system ==
List of presidents of OPQ: Mr René Dussault (1973 to 30 June 1977), André Desgagné (1 August 1977 to 1987), Thomas J. Mulcair (9 Dec. 1987-31 August 1993), Robert Diamant (1 Sep. 1993-31 Aug. 1998), Jean-K. Samson (Sept. 28, 1998-2003), Gaétan Lemoyne (29 sept. 2003-2007) and Jean-Paul Dutrisac (2007-today).

List of vice-presidents of the OPQ: Jean-Marie Dionne (1973-7 Nov. 1983), Louis Roy (1983-1993), Sylvie de Grandmont (1994-2007), Christiane Gagnon (2007-today).

List of ministers responsible for the enforcement of professional laws: Claude Castonguay (until July 1973), Fernand Lalonde (Nov. 1973-?), Bernard Lachapelle (1974-1976), Jacques-Yvan Morin (1983-1985), Camille Laurin (1980-1983), Yves Bérubé (1983-1985), Claude Ryan (1985-1988), Pierre Fortier (1988-1989), Raymond Savoie (1989-1993), Jacques Chagnon (1993-1994), Paul Bégin (1994-1996), Serge Ménard (1996-1998), Linda Goupil (1998-1999), Paul Bégin (2000-2001), Normand Jutras (2001-2002), Marc Bellemare (2002-2003), Jacques P. Dupuis (2003-2005), Yvon Marcoux (2005-2006), Jacques P. Dupuis (2007-2008), Kathleen Weil (2008–2010), Jean-Marc Fournier (2010-2012), Bertrand Saint-Arnaud (2012-2013), Stéphanie Lavallée (2013-today).

== Professional Inspection within each Professional Orders ==
Within each professional order, the professional inspection of the professional practice of the members proves to be a mechanism for education, prevention and awareness.

Each professional order shall have a professional inspection committee which is composed of at least three members of the Order appointed by the Board of Directors of each Order. The main roles of these committees relate to monitoring the application of deontological and ethical rules governing the practice of the profession. The interventions of these committees contribute in particular to the control of the competences of the members.

A professional inspection committee shall in particular inspect the professional records kept by their respective members, books, registers, medicines, poisons, products, substances, apparatus and equipment used in the practice of the profession, and the audit of property entrusted to them by their clients or another person.
