= Professional Order (Portugal) =

A Professional Order (Portuguese: Ordem), more generically known as a professional public association (Portuguese: associação pública profissional) is, in the Portuguese legal system, a public entity with an associative structure representing a profession that should be subject to control of access and exercise. The Order is also responsible for the elaboration of specific technical and deontological norms and has an autonomous disciplinary regime by imperative of tutelage, in the pursue of public interest.

== General Principles ==
The establishment of professional Order is exceptional and can only take place when its purpose is to safeguard a public interest of particular importance that the State cannot directly ensure. Its creation must be adequate, necessary and proportionate to regulate the legal property to be protected, and to respect to professions that should be subject to it.

All Orders are legal persons governed by public law and each regulated profession can only correspond to one Order. Nevertheless, the same Order may represent more than one profession, provided that they all have a common technical or scientific basis.

== Incorporation of an Order ==
Orders are incorporated by law, therefore incorporation of an Order starts with a bill tabled by the Assembly of the Republic and approved by the President of the Republic.

The creation of new Order is always preceded by an independent study on its need to achieve the public interest and their impact on the regulation of the profession. The study also involves the hearing of the existing professional associations and a public consultation.

== Denomination ==
Under the law, the term Order (in Portuguese: Ordem) is to be used only when the exercise of the regulated professions depends on the prior attainment of a bachelor's degree or higher. Should the profession depend on the attainment of any other degree, the association is to be called a Chamber (in Portuguese: Câmara).

== Colleges, Mace-Bearers and Symbols ==
Orders can be internally subdivided into specialized colleges (in Portuguese: Colégios das Especialidades), which group different areas of expertise within the Profession. For example, the Order of Biologist has four specialized colleges that group four major fields: the college of Environment, the college of Biotechnology, the college of Education, and the college of Human Biology and Health.

The President of an Order has the title of Mace-Bearer (in Portuguese: Bastonário).

In accordance to Portuguese Law, Orders are entitles to their symbols, chains of office and flags. Under these prerogatives, most Orders, namely the oldest ones have adopted as their symbols, coat or arms, such is the case of the: Order of the Medical Doctors, the Order of the Engineers, the Order of the Engineering Technicians, the Order of the Economists and the Order of the Veterinarians.

The Order of the Nurses had adopted and heraldic badge, while the remaining Orders have adopted logos.

== Legal Framework ==
The Constitution of the Portuguese Republic, under Article 267 (4), establishes that Orders can only be incorporated to satisfy specific needs and that they cannot perform the functions of trade unions associations. Furthermore, their internal organization must be based on respect of the rights of its members and the democratic formation of their organs.

== Existing Orders ==
- Order of the Pharmacists (founded in 1835 as the Pharmaceutical Lusitanian Society and legally succeeded by incorporation as Order in 1972)
- Order of the Lawyers (incorporated in 1926)
- Order of the Engineers (incorporated in 1935)
- Order of the Physicians (incorporated in 1938)
- Order of the Customs Agents (incorporated first as a Chamber in 1945 and then as Order in 2015)
- Order of the Veterinarians (incorporated in 1991)
- Order of the Architects (incorporated in 1998)
- Order of the Biologists (incorporated in 1998)
- Order of the Economists (incorporated in 1998)
- Order of the Nurses (incorporated in 1998)
- Order of the Dentists (incorporated in 1998)
- Order of the Chartered Accountants (incorporated in 1999)
- Order of the Engineering Technicians (incorporated in 1999)
- Order of the Statutory Auditors (incorporated in 1999)
- Order of the Solicitors and Enforcement Agents (incorporated first as a Chamber in 2003 and then as Order in 2015)
- Order of the Notaries (incorporated in 2004)
- Order of the Nutritionists (incorporated in 2011)
- Order of the Psychologists (incorporated in 2008)
- Order of the Social Workers (incorporated in 2019)

== Bibliography ==
- COSTA, Carlos Filipe Fernandes de Andrade. «Ordens profissionais : Associações de empresas (o caso particular da ordem dos advogados)» in E-publica, vol. 2, n.º 1, março de 2015, pp. 69–98. ISSN 2183-184x
- MOREIRA, Vital. Administração autónoma e associações públicas. Coimbra, Coimbra Editora, 1997ISBN 972-32-0797-4.
- MOREIRA, Vital. Auto-regulação profissional e administração pública. Coimbra, Livraria Almedina, 1997. ISBN 978-972-40-1044-1
- PARDAL, Paulina Pinto. Hetero-Regulação vs. Auto-Regulação : As Entidades Reguladoras Independentes e as Associações Públicas Profissionais : em especial a Ordem dos Advogados. Porto, 2016. Dissertação de Mestrado em Direito Administrativo apresentada à Universidade Católica Portuguesa.
