= Elísio de Moura =

Portuguese physician and psychiatrist

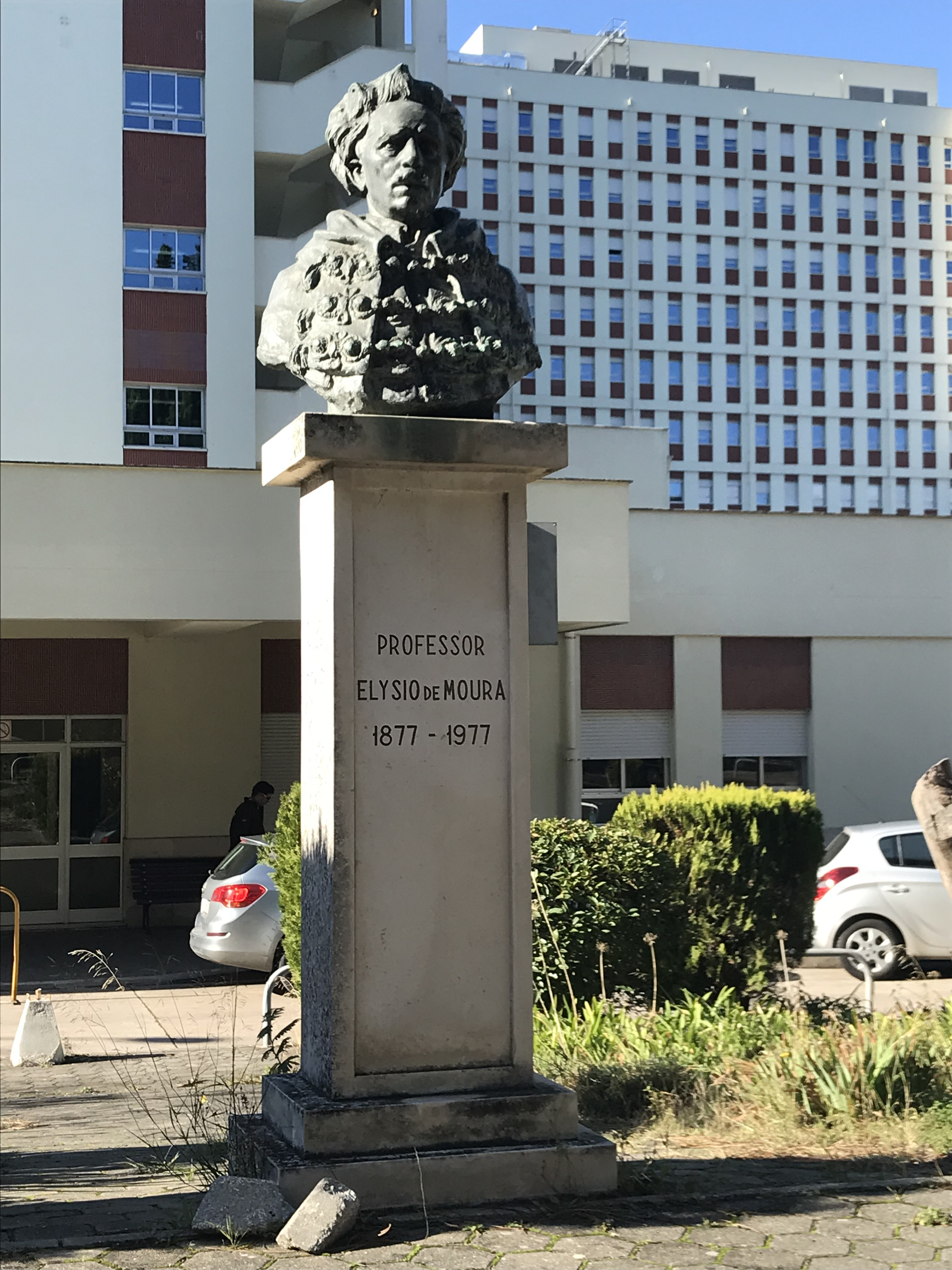
Elísio de Moura Azevedo

Elísio de Moura Azevedo (born 30 August 1877 in Braga – 18 June 1977 in Coimbra) was a Portuguese physician, professor, psychiatrist and the first president of the College of Physicians in 1939.

== Biography ==
Elísio de Moura was notable for teaching and research in psychiatry and neurology. He contributed, in the beginning of the Republic, to keep the faculty of medicine at the University of Coimbra, which was at risk of moving to the new University of Lisbon and University of Porto.

Elísio de Moura was the son of José Alves de Moura, who studied theology, and subsequently became a professor and rector of the Liceu de Braga (currently Escola Secundária Sá de Miranda), and his wife Emília da Costa Pereira de Azevedo. He was the only one of his parents' ten children to pursue medicine. On October 15, 1892, at the age of fifteen, he enrolled at the University of Coimbra, as a student at the faculties of mathematics and philosophy. On July 10, 1895, he obtained a bachelor's degree in philosophy. He then enrolled at the Faculty of Medicine of the University of Coimbra, attending from 1895 to 1901. On March 1, 1901, he completed the medical degree. After graduating with distinction, he was appointed substitute professor at the Faculty of Medicine of the University of Coimbra in 1902. Later, as a full professor, he taught internal pathology, medical propaedeutics, obstetrics, and pediatrics. It was the conducting of the courses in internal pathology and internal medicine that motivated Elísio de Moura to study neurology and psychiatry. In 1907, he began teaching neurology and psychiatry at the University of Coimbra.

Along with research and teaching, the doctor also founded and directed what is today known as the Casa da Infância Dr Elísio de Moura in Coimbra. In 1939, his colleagues elected him to become the first president of the Portuguese Medical Association.

On 5 June 1947, he was made Grand Officer of the Military Order of Sant'Iago da Espada. On 31 May 1961 he was awarded the Grand Cross of the Order of Benemerence and on 5 July 1971 he was elevated to Great Britain, Cross of the Military Order of Sant'Iago da Espada.

He died on 18 June 1977 and was buried in Mount Cemetery d'Arcos in Braga.
