= François Gagnon =

François Gagnon may refer to:

- François Gagnon (politician)
- François Gagnon (journalist)
