= Confédération Fiscale Européenne =

CFE Tax Advisers Europe, formally known as Confédération Fiscale Européenne (CFE), is a Brussels-based umbrella association of European tax advisers. It was founded in 1959. CFE's members are 33 national tax adviser organisations from 26 European countries, representing more than 200,000 tax advisers.

== Structure ==
The General Assembly is the governing body of CFE Tax Advisers Europe, in which each member state is able to be represented by up to six delegates, and observers countries by up to two delegates. The primary responsibilities of the General Assembly are to decide on the acceptance of members and observers, to approve amendments to the governing statutes, to adopt the business report of the Executive Board and to approve the accounts and budget for the CFE. The Executive Board is in charge of the day to day work of CFE Tax Advisers Europe and reports to the General Assembly. The Board monitors developments in taxation law and the profession within Europe, and devises and manages CFE’s work streams arising from these issues. Aleksandar Ivanovski serves currently as Director of CFE Tax Advisers Europe.

CFE tried to encourage a harmonization of ethical standards for tax advisors across Europe.
