= Association of Taxation Technicians =

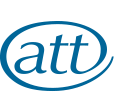
- Abbreviation: ATT
- Members: 10,000
- President: Graham Batty
- Deputy President: Barry Jefferd
- Vice President: Eleanor Theochari
- Chief Executive: Jane Ashton
- Website: att.org.uk

The Association of Taxation Technicians or ATT, is a leading professional body in the UK for those providing tax compliance services and related activities. It is registered with the Charity Commission in the UK.

The association has over 9,000 members and fellows together with over 5,000 students. Members and fellows use the practising title of 'Taxation Technician' or ‘Taxation Technician (Fellow)’ and the designatory letters 'ATT' and 'ATT (Fellow)' respectively.

The ATT is based in London, UK. Although an independent organisation, the ATT shares back-office services with the Chartered Institute of Taxation (CIOT).

The association is a charity and a leading professional body for those providing UK tax compliance services. Its primary charitable objective is to promote education and the study of tax administration and practice. One of its key aims is to provide an appropriate qualification for individuals who undertake tax compliance work. It contributes to consultations on the development of the UK tax system and seek to ensure that, for the general public, it is workable and as fair as possible.

The ATT is a technician level qualification which entitles those who have completed the exams and obtained relevant supervised work experience to call themselves taxation technicians. Training may be provided by other organizations. For example, BPP University provides courses for students who plan to sit the ATT examinations to qualify as a taxation technician. As well as passing the exams, students seeking certification as a registered Taxation Technician must be able to show that they have two years' of acceptable practical experience.

== Higher Apprenticeship framework ==
In 2011, the UK government launched the Higher Apprenticeship Fund to support a new wave of Apprenticeship frameworks. With the support from that Fund, PwC led the development of the Higher Apprenticeship in Professional Services framework.

The new framework includes distinct pathways for Audit, Tax and Management consulting. The tax pathway within this framework is aligned with the requirements of the ATT exams.

It is said that the framework has the blend of technical knowledge, wider competence and business skills that employers have told they are looking for to enable Apprentices to operate effectively and productively in a tax environment.

== Branches ==
There are 40 branches run in conjunction with the Chartered Institute of Taxation catering for the requirements of the members and students within their areas.

== Technical submissions to HMRC ==
The technical officers of the ATT meet with officials from HM Treasury and HM Revenue & Customs, to help ensure that the viewpoint of the taxpayer and tax practitioners is taken into account in the development of HMRC's policy and practice.
