= Institute of Indirect Taxation =

The Institute of Indirect Taxation (IIT) was a distinct professional body in the United Kingdom prior to its merger with the Chartered Institute of Taxation in August 2012.

Members of the IIT specialised in the study and practice of indirect taxes. The body was formed in July 1991 and formally launched in October 1991. It gained permission to call itself an institute in December of the same year. It operated as a company limited by guarantee.

Entry to the institute was normally gained by taking up to four professional examinations in indirect taxation. There were two routes through the exams, the Value Added Tax route and the customs route, which reflect two of the most major areas that indirect taxation is applied to in the United Kingdom. It was possible to gain exemptions from some of the exams through possessing other suitable qualifications which include those from various British accountancy professional bodies, the Chartered Institute of Taxation and HM Revenue and Customs.

The four papers were:

- I: Legal, Business and Professional Ethics
- II: optional paper which is dependent on whether the VAT or customs route through the qualification is being taken
- III: Other Indirect Taxes
- IV: Stamp Taxes, Direct Taxes and Interaction of all Taxes

Those who have passed the examinations and been accepted into membership were entitled to use the designatory letters AIIT (Associate of the Institute of Indirect Taxation). Upon submission of a thesis to the institute it was possible to become a Fellow of the Institute of Indirect Taxation which allowed for the use of the designatory letters FIIT. Other categories of member, which were without designatory letters, were student members and affiliate members. It was also possible to be made an honorary member or Fellow.

== Merger with CIOT ==
The 500 members of the (IIT) became members of the Chartered Institute of Taxation (CIOT) in August 2012 following the memberships of both bodies approving the merger of the two bodies at separate meetings in May 2012.
