= Ordre des ingénieurs du Québec =

- Founded: 1974
- Type: Professional order
- Location: Montreal (Quebec)
- Origins: After Quebec's Professional Code came into effect. The Quebec Corporation of Engineers became the Ordre des ingénieurs du Québec.
- Region served: Province of Quebec
- Members: 65,000+
- Key people: Sophie Larivière-Mantha, Eng. (current president)
- Website: oiq.qc.ca

The Ordre des ingénieurs du Québec (OIQ) is the self-regulatory body that governs Quebec's 65,001 professional engineers. In Quebec, the OIQ carefully monitors compliance with rules of this trade and with the professional integrity of its members while also overseeing the development of the engineering profession.
