= FP Canada =

- Founded: 1995
- Type: Professional Organization
- Location: Toronto
- Region served: Canada, including a special status for Quebec members
- Website: www.fpcanada.ca

It is a national professional body working in the public interest, FP Canada (formerly known as Financial Planning Standards Council) certifies professional financial planners.

== See also ==
- Partners in the Profession
- Donald J. Johnston Lifetime Achievement Award in Financial Planning
- FP Canada Fellow Distinction
- President’s List
- History
- Find a Certified Financial Planner
