= Ordre des administrateurs agréés du Québec =

Ordre des administrateurs du Québec
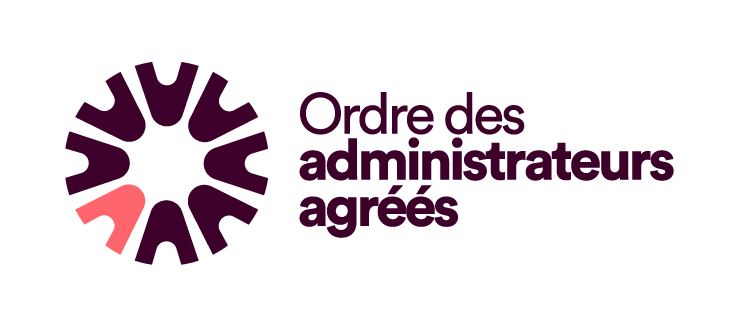
- Founded: 1973 (original association founded in 1954)
- Type: Professional Organization
- Location: Montreal, Quebec
- Origins: After Quebec's Professional Code came into effect. The "Corporation of Chartered Administrators of Quebec" became the "Ordre des administrateurs agréés du Québec".
- Region served: Quebec
- Members: 2100+
- Official language: fr
- Key people: Elias Kallas, Adm.A., (current president)
- Website: www.adma.qc.ca

The Ordre des administrateurs agréés du Québec (lit. 'Chartered Administrators Order of Quebec', Adm.A.) is a professional order mandated by the Government of Quebec to regulate the practice of the administrateurs agréés (chartered administrators) in Quebec, Canada.

Under article 37i of the Quebec Professional Code, Adm.A. may exercise the following professional activities: participate in the establishment, management and management of public bodies or enterprises, determine or remake their structures as well as coordinate and control their production or distribution methods and their economic or financial policies and provide advisory services in these matters.

The head office of the order is located in Montreal.

== Titles Adm.A. and CMC ==
The Professional Code of Quebec provides that the administrateurs agréés (chartered administrators) shall practice a profession in a reserved capacity in Quebec. Only the administrateurs agréés registered on the Ordre board are permitted to use the such title (Adm.A.) or "Certified Management Consultant" (cmc) if they hold a valid license to this end.

== History ==
This "Corporation des administrateurs professionnels" (in English: Corporation of professionals administrators), comes from the Association des L.S.C. de l’Université Laval (Association of L.S.C. Of Laval University), which had set up a committee in 1953 to study the question of the professional status of management graduates. The primary purpose of establishing a professional association was to gain recognition equivalent to that of members of the accounting profession; around 1945, the latter being considered as the only true legitimate professionals in the business world.

This new corporation was dedicated to the defense of the interests of its members and to the promotion of the profession of administrator.

From professional corporation to professional order

In 1994, amendments to the Professional Code of Quebec and the measures adopted by the Office des professions du Québec changed the orientation of the organization that became the Ordre des administrateurs agréés du Québec (OAAQ). The mission of the OAAQ is redefined and therefore includes a component to defend the interests of the public. The Order of ADMA now requires its members to contract professional liability insurance when they deal directly with the public.

On June 17, 2015, the order launched the LaCopropriété.info website, featuring a unique and educational content on condominiums in Quebec.

== Regulations ==
In their professional activities, the Adm.A. are regulated in particular by:

- The Professional Code of Quebec,
- The Code of Ethics of the OAAQ (c. C-26, r.14.1, updated in 2004, 2011 and 2013). This Code determines, in particular, acts derogating from the dignity of the profession, provisions intended to preserve the confidentiality of information of a confidential nature that comes to the knowledge of the member of the OAAQ in the practice of his profession, Exercise of the rights of access and rectification provided for in sections 60.5 and 60.6 of the Professional Code of Quebec and the conditions, obligations and prohibitions with respect to advertising by a member of the OAAQ.

Other regulations governing the OAAQ and its members are:

1. Regulation respecting the diplomas awarded by designated educational institutions that grant the permits and certificates of specialists of the professional orders (C-26, r.2, section 1.27);
2. Regulation respecting general meetings and determining the location of the head office of the Corporation des administrateurs agréés du Québec (C-26, r.11);
3. Regulation respecting professional liability insurance of the "Ordre des administrateurs agréés du Québec" (C-26, r.12, last updated 2008);
4. Regulation respecting the legal authorizations to practice the profession of certified administrator outside Québec that give rise to the permit of the "Ordre des administrateurs agréés du Québec" (C-26, r.13);
5. Regulation respecting the training committee for certified administrators (C-26, r.15);
6. Trustee accounts for Trustees Regulations (C-26, r.16, last update in 2010)
7. Regulation respecting the issuance of a license of a certified administrator of the "Ordre des administrateurs agréés du Québec" to give effect to the arrangement entered into by the Order under the Agreement between Québec and France on mutual recognition of professional qualifications (C-26, r.16.1);
8. Regulation respecting elections and regional representation on the Board of Directors of the "Ordre des administrateurs agréés du Québec" (C-26, r.17);
9. Regulation respecting the practice of the profession of chartered administrator (C-26, r.17.1);
10. Regulation respecting the Compensation Fund of the "Ordre des administrateurs agréés du Québec" (C-26, r.18, last update in 2010);
11. Regulation respecting the compulsory professional development of certified administrators of Québec (C-26, r.19.01);
12. Regulation respecting the equivalence standards for diplomas and training for the issue of a permit from the "Ordre des administrateurs agréés du Québec" (C-26, r.19.1);
13. Regulation respecting the procedure for conciliation and arbitration of the accounts of members of the "Ordre des administrateurs agréés du Québec" (C-26, r.21);
14. Regulation respecting the procedure of the professional inspection committee of certified administrators (C-26, r.22);
15. Regulation respecting the keeping of records and consulting firms of members of the "Ordre des administrateurs agréés du Québec" (C-26, r.24);
16. Regulation respecting professional development periods for certified administrators (C-26, r.23).

== See also ==
Media related to Category:Ordre des Administrateurs agréés du Québec at Wikimedia Commons

- Office des professions du Québec (OPQ)
- Conseil Interprofessionnel du Québec (CIQ)
