= Chambre de l'assurance de dommages (Québec) =

Agency overview
- Formed: 1998
- Jurisdiction: Canadian province of Quebec
- Headquarters: 999, boul. De Maisonneuve Ouest, bureau 1200, Montréal, Québec, Canada
- Agency executive: Diane Beaudry, CPA, CA, IAS.A., President and CEO
- Website: www.chad.ca/en

The Chambre de l'assurance de dommages (Damage Insurance Chamber) (ChAD) in Quebec (Canada) was created under section 284 of the "Act respecting the distribution of financial products and services" (RSQ, (C) D-9.2) at the same time of the creation of the Chambre de la sécurité financière (Québec) (Chamber of Financial Security). Legal entity, its mission is to ensure the protection of the public in matters of damage insurance. The ChAD oversees the compulsory professional development and the ethical conduct of over 15,000 damage insurance agents and brokers, as well as claims adjusters; and provides preventive oversight and enforces discipline on individuals working in these fields.

== Members ==
Members of the "Chambre de l'assurance de dommages" (Damage Insurance Chamber) are:

- Damage insurance brokers (working for a brokerage or self-employed),
- Damage insurance agents (working for insurers),
- Claims adjusters (working for an insurer or a firm).

The "Chambre de l'assurance de dommages" ensures the compulsory continuing education and professional ethics of its members.

== Regulation ==
Professionals in property and casualty insurance are certified by the Autorité des marchés financiers (Québec) (Authority of the financial markets) and supervised by the "Chambre d'assurance de dommages". For example, agents, brokers and claims adjusters:

- Must adhere to a code of ethics;
- Must follow continuing education;
- Can be investigated by a trustee, may be inspected by the "Chambre de l'assurance de dommages" or by the Autorité des marchés financiers (Québec)

== Laws and regulations ==
At the ethical and regulatory level, members of the Damage Insurance Chamber must comply with the following laws and regulations:

- An "Act respecting the distribution of financial products and services".
- Code of Ethics for Insurance Representatives of damage.
- Code of Conduct for Claims Adjusters.
- Mandatory Continuing Education Requirements Regulation of the "Chambre de l'assurance de dommages.

A professional who does not respect his obligations may be brought before the Discipline Committee of the "Chambre de l'assurance de dommages" and receive a penalty which may range from reprimand to temporary or permanent cancellation, in accordance with the section 156 of the Professional Code.

== Discipline ==
The Discipline Committee shall hear any complaint made by the trustee against a professional. Complaints may come from a consumer or from any member of the "Chambre de l'assurance de dommages". Thus, a consumer who feels wronged or a representative who is a witness to non-ethical practices may apply directly to the "Chambre de l'assurance de dommages" or the Information Center of the Autorité des marchés financiers (Québec).

== Coalition for the Promotion of Damage Insurance Professions ==
In 2002, the Coalition for the Promotion of the Damage Insurance Professions (Coalition) was set up on the initiative of the "Chambre de la sécurité financière". The entire insurance industry then mobilized by associating itself with this cause, its program and its activities. The mission of this coalition is to attract more candidates to career opportunities in property and casualty insurance and to enhance the image of the professionals who work there.

The Coalition's Board of Directors consists of 13 executive directors from various organizations or categories of members. Maya Raic, President and CEO of the "Damage Insurance Chamber", is a member of the Board of Directors.

== History ==
- Sept. 2017 - Bill 141 is tabled at the National Assembly of Quebec, proposing the amalgamation of the mission of the CAD to the Autorité des marchés financiers (Québec) (AMF).
- June 13, 2018 - Adoption of Bill 141 amended at the National Assembly of Quebec, after withdrawing the proposed amalgamation of CAD to the AMF.

== Price Marcel-Tassé ==
In 1999, the "Chambre de l'assurance de dommages" (ChAD) launched the Marcel-Tassé Prize with the objective of encouraging and honoring individuals of the next generation in damage insurance.

The Marcel-Tassé Prize consists of two parts: • general: addressing the next generation of a college or university program not specializing in damage insurance; • specialized in property and casualty insurance: intended for graduates of the DEC (collegial studies diploma) in insurance and financial services or an AEC (attestation of collegial studies) in property and casualty insurance.

For the insurance industry, the Marcel-Tassé Awards are an exceptional recognition and a remarkable distinction. The Marcel-Tassé Awards are each awarded with a $2,000 grant.

== See also ==
- Autorité des marchés financiers (Québec) (AMF)
- Chambre de la sécurité financière (Québec) (CSF)
