= Conseil Interprofessionnel du Québec =

Canadian legal entity

Conseil Interprofessionnel du Québec (CIQ)
- Abbreviation: CIQ
- Formation: 1965
- Type: Professional organism
- Purpose: The CIQ is the collective way of the 46 Professional Orders of Quebec and an advisory body of the Government of Quebec
- Headquarters: 550, rue Sherbrooke Ouest; Montreal, Quebec, Canada
- Region served: CA-QC
- Members: 385 000 (2017)
- Key people: Gyslaine Desrosiers, current president
- Website: professions-quebec.org/en/

The Conseil Interprofessionnel du Québec (In English: Quebec Interprofessional Council) is a Canadian legal entity regrouping the professional orders in Quebec, which are represented by their president or another member designated by the board of directors of the order. This entity is legally constituted by the Professional Code of Quebec. The head office of the "Conseil interprofessionnel du Québec" (CIQ) is located at 550, rue Sherbrooke Ouest in Montreal.

== History ==
The Quebec Interprofessional Council, established in 1965 under the 3rd part of the Quebec Companies Act, is a non-profit organization (legal person). The CIQ was initially the voluntary grouping of 15 professional corporations, referred to as "professional orders" since 1994.

When the Professional Code of Quebec was adopted in 1973, which came into force in 1974, the council's existence and role were recognized by specific legislative provisions. In addition to regrouping the professional orders, he was entrusted, in parallel with the newly created Office des professions du Québec, as an advisory body to the public authority. In this regard, the Professional Code of Quebec may be consulted under the Professional Legislation section of the commission's home page.

In 1990, the CIQ instituted a system of recognition and honour for the entire Quebec professional system. This program includes a prestigious "Prix" awarded annually to a person and a "Merit" prize awarded annually by the CIQ to a professional of each of the orders. This award is bestowed by the CIQ to highlight the exceptional career of distinguished professionals as well as their contribution to the influence of their profession and the development of Québec's professional system. The work that symbolizes the "Prix du CIQ" is a solid silver medal.

The first CIQ website was launched on May 24, 2002.

== Members of the Council ==
The Council brings together the 46 professional orders in Quebec, which collectively have more than 385,000 members (see list of orders below).

== Mission ==
The Conseil is a grouping of professional bodies to which the Professional Code of Quebec recognizes an existence and grants an advisory body to the governmental authority.

As a grouping of "professional orders", the council:

- Provides opportunities for exchange and mutual assistance to professional orders;
- Intervenes, when appropriate, as a place of mobilization and collective voice of professional orders on matters of common interest;
- Acts as a service unit to the professional orders, according to the mandates and budgets adopted;
- Acts as a reference to the public concerned, using an information approach on the value of the professional status and system and the promotion of the public interest that results from it.

As an advisory body to the public authority, the council is consulted, inter alia, on:

- General and particular orientations of the professional system,
- Bills or regulations affecting the system,
- The appointment of certain officers and members of the Office des professions du Québec,
- The appointment of non-member directors,
- The contribution to the funding of the Office des professions du Québec,
- The budget estimates of the Office des professions du Québec,
- The constitution of a new Order or the integration of a professional order.

Some of the council's interventions are required by law. It may be a request from the government or the minister to which the law requires a response or a consultation step under the act.

The Council may also, on its own initiative and after consulting its members, carry out other interventions. The Council therefore issues opinions on various projects relating to governmental and legislative actions that affect the purpose, coherence and effectiveness of the professional system.

Finally, the Conseil contributes to debates on issues important to Québec society, in a broad public interest perspective.

== Order to protect ==
In 2013, the Conseil interprofessionnel du Québec and the 45 professional colleges jointly launched an information campaign that aims to reinforce public confidence in professionals and professional orders:

- The role of professional bodies and the means available to them;
- The social and economic contribution of professional orders and their members.

Under the theme "Order to Protect", this campaign is based on a blogging type and takes place primarily in social media.

== Recognition of internationally trained individuals ==
Recognition of the skills of internationally trained individuals has been a hot topic for many years, and the Quebec Professional Orders are doing well on this.

For example, there are "mutual recognition agreements" (MRAs) for graduate professionals in some countries. This is notably the case for France.

The Quebec-France Accord, signed in 2008, ensures that graduates from 25 professions have their diploma recognized as equivalent in both jurisdictions. At the end of 2012, 624 professionals graduated in France and 119 professionals graduated in Quebec had received an MRA.

When a person is a graduate of a country that does not have an MRA with Quebec, the candidate must then follow the process of recognition of an equivalence, described in detail on the website of the "Conseil Interprofessionnel du Québec".

The number of applications for recognition of foreign diplomas has increased by more than 600% in 15 years. The 45 professional orders in Quebec shared more than 5,000 applications in 2011–2012. The College of Engineers and the Nurses are most in demand, accounting for more than 40% of the total number of applications received.

Of the applications received in 2011–2012, almost 95% were accepted in full or partially. This means that only 5% of the files were refused, which corresponds to the reality of the last 5 years.

The overall picture of the recognition of equivalences in the Quebec system is positive. This demonstrates the importance that professional bodies place on efforts to improve their processes for recognizing the skills of internationally trained individuals.

== Annual prices of the CIQ ==
The CIQ awards the "CIQ Award" generally to one member per year of each professional order for its contribution to the advancement of its profession.

== See also ==
Media related to Category:Conseil interprofessionnel du Québec at Wikimedia Commons

- Office des professions du Québec (OPQ)
- Professional Code of Quebec
