= Professional Code of Quebec =

Professional law in Quebec

The Professional Code is a Quebec law that governs the professional system of the province of Quebec, in Canada. This system is composed of the Government of Quebec, the National Assembly of Quebec, the 46 professional orders, the Office des professions du Québec (OPQ) and of Conseil Interprofessionnel du Québec (CIQ) (Quebec's Interprofessional Council).

== Framework of the Professional Code ==
The Professional Code is a framework law defining the mandates, responsibilities, structure and functioning of:

- The Office des professions du Québec (OPQ),
- The Conseil Interprofessionnel du Québec (English: Quebec Interprofessional Council) (CIQ),
- The Quebec Professional Orders.

The Professional Code of Quebec defines:

1. the practice of the professional activities of members subject to the Professional Code;
2. the exclusive use of reserved professional titles;
3. the exclusivity of acts reserved for certain professions;
4. regulations to be adopted by the board of directors of each order;
5. the roles, duties and functioning of the board of directors of each professional order;
6. licenses issued by radiology, psychotherapist, directorate of a dental prosthesis laboratory;
7. the practice of professional activities within a limited liability partnership or a joint-stock company;
8. provisions specific to certain professions;
9. provisions for professional inspection and discipline;
10. penal provisions;
11. investigations and immunities;
12. the role of the OPQ Commissioner of Complaints regarding mechanisms for recognizing professional competencies.

== History ==
The Professional Code was created in 1973. In July 1973, the articles of the Quebec Professional Code relating to the Conseil Interprofessionnel du Québec (Quebec Interprofessional Council) entered into force and in September 1973 for the articles relating to the Office des professions du Québec. The majority of the other articles will be in force on 1 February 1974.
