= Autorité des marchés financiers (Quebec) =

Agency overview
- Formed: February 1, 2004
- Jurisdiction: Canadian province of Quebec
- Headquarters: Quebec City, Quebec
- Agency executive: Yves Ouellet, President and CEO
- Website: www.lautorite.qc.ca

The Autorité des marchés financiers (AMF; lit. 'Financial Markets Authority') is a self-funding government agency responsible for financial regulation in the Canadian province of Quebec. It regulates the province's financial markets and provides assistance to consumers of financial products and services. Under its enabling legislation, the AMF's mission is to enforce the laws governing the regulation of the financial sector, particularly in the areas of insurance, securities, deposit institutions (other than banks) and the distribution of financial products and services.

The AMF acts in coordination with other self-regulating bodies such as the Chambre des services financiers (Chamber of Financial Security) and the Chambre de l'Assurance de dommages (Chamber of Damage Insurance), including professional ethics and continuing education.

== History ==
Established under An Act respecting the Autorité des marchés financiers on February 1, 2004, the AMF is unique by virtue of its integrated regulation of the Québec financial sector, notably in the areas of insurance, securities, deposit institutions (other than banks) and the distribution of financial products and services.

The AMF derives its authority from the Loi sur l'Autorité des marchés financiers (Financial Market Authority Act). It is the result of the merger of the Commission des valeurs mobilières du Québec (Québec Securities Commission - CVMQ), the Bureau des services financiers (Quebec) (Financial Services Bureau - BSF), the Régie de l'assurance-dépôt du Québec (Québec Deposit Insurance Corporation - RADQ), the Fonds d'indemnisation des services financiers (Financial Services Compensation Fund - FISF) and the Inspecteur general des institutions financières (Inspector General of Financial Institutions - IGIF).

The AMF was established by Bill 2002-45 of December 11, 2002 under the name Agence nationale d'encadrement du secteur financier (National Financial Sector Management Agency), in order to integrate the functions of the BSF and the CVMQ.

It was then renamed to its current name by Bill 2004-37 of December 17, 2004.

Since 2023, Yves Ouellet has been the AMF's President and Chief Executive Officer.

== Responsibilities ==
In addition to the powers and responsibilities conferred on it by its incorporating legislation, the AMF oversees the enforcement of laws in each of the areas it regulates. It can also draw on self-regulatory organizations (SROs), to which certain regulatory powers are delegated.

The AMF is financially self-sufficient through the fees and dues paid by the persons and firms governed by the legislation it is charged with enforcing.

The AMF is headed by a President and Chief Executive Officer appointed by the government. In applying its governance rules, the AMF is supported by an Internal Auditor as well as an Advisory Board.

== Other mandates of the Authority ==
The AMF also administers the following functions:

- Provides the required authorization for RVER (Régime volontaire d'épargne retraite) (VRSP - Voluntary Retirement Savings Plan) issuers and for companies wishing to enter into a public contract;
- Issue the required license to money service businesses;
- Gives permission to companies participating in a tendering or award process for public contracts and subcontracts;
- Seeks to implement the Act respecting transparency measures in the mining, oil and gas industries.

== Registries administered by the AMF ==
The Authority permits public access to various registries:

- Registry of individuals and businesses authorized to carry out various activities in Québec, such as insurance or administration of VRSP;
- Registry of issuers subject to Québec securities;
- Registry of insurers to which it grants the right to carry on insurance activities in Québec;
- Registry of deposit-taking institutions: financial services cooperatives (caisses), trust companies and savings companies to which it grants the right to carry out activities in Québec;
- Registry of enterprises that have been authorized to conclude public contracts and subcontracts;
- Registry of legal entities authorized to act as administrator of a VRSP;
- Participatory financing portals operating under two types of plan: a registered dealer with the AMF or a participating financing scheme for start-ups.

== AMF in Canada ==
The AMF is one of two major securities regulators in Canada, the largest being the Ontario Securities Commission. The AMF regulates securities in the province of Quebec. The major exchange under its purview is the Montreal Exchange.

== See also ==
- Autorité des marchés financiers (France)
- Financial Markets Authority of the West African Monetary Union
- Securities Commission
- Canadian Securities Administrators (CSA)
- Canadian securities regulation (CSR)
- Ontario Securities Commission (OSC)
- Bureau des services financiers (Quebec) (BSF)
- Chambre de la sécurité financière (Québec) (CSF)
- Chambre de l'assurance de dommages (Québec)
- Montreal Exchange (MX)
- List of financial supervisory authorities by country
