= Professional order =

A professional order is an organization that regulates the activities and members of a profession.

Unlike a professional association or some trade unions, membership in a professional order is obligatory for members of the profession, since registration in the order is a necessary condition of practice of the profession.

Such associations have existed since before the 16th century. For example, the Royal College of Physicians received its charter in 1518, with the "power to grant licenses to those with actual qualifications and to punish unqualified practitioners and those engaging in malpractice".

In France, the oldest professional orders are the "bars" (in French: Barreau), which were created in the 17th century. Medical orders are more recent, but the creation of the Order of Physicians in France in 1940 is the culmination of fifty years of claim. The one in Belgium was created in 1938, while its Quebec counterpart, the Collège des médecins du Québec (Quebec College of Physicians) (CMQ), dates back to 1847.

A professional order is a legal person governed by private law with a public service mission, constituted by a law defining its public function and a decree by the Council of State giving it its status.

Under the pressure of the World Trade Organization, relayed by the European Union, many liberal professions tend to be deregulated, being seen as obstacles to free trade. On the other hand, many lobby groups propose that certain professions should be supervised by professional orders for better protection of the public. In addition, some professional associations claim the status of a professional order to demonstrate professionalism and distinguish themselves from professions not controlled by the professional system.

== Missions ==
A professional order may carry out the following duties:

- Regulation of access to the profession (verification of the professional qualification, possibly validation of diplomas) and its follow-up (keeping of registration registers of members);
- Contribution to lifelong learning or, more simply, monitoring of the obligation of continuing education;
- Representation of the profession vis-à-vis the public authorities;
- Promotion of the profession through the media and schools and universities;
- To organize competition among its members on a fair, non-venal and respectful basis, while limiting concentrations and dominant positions;
- A judicial function, with a Disciplinary Council in which a Councilor of State is sitting and whose decisions are under appeal by the administrative courts, these decisions may be recommendations, warnings, reprimands, suspension, delisting, liquidation and Under ordinary administration, in the event of a violation of the code of ethics of the profession;
- Arbitration to resolve conflicts of interpretation relating to agreements between a professional and his client on the basis of the documents he advocates or between two members;
- More generally, control of the respect of patients and clients in the defense of the general interest.

An order is not a union. They are not in opposition but complement each other. While the union defends the interests of professionals only, the council promotes the interests of the profession. The latter may, for example, in disciplinary training, punish a professional who behaves contrary to the interests of the profession, which is absolutely not the case with trade unions. In addition, the council of public order has powers of public authority which enable it to take administrative decisions, unlike unions whose powers are strictly governed by private law.

In the Canadian province of Quebec, a superior body oversees the proper functioning of each of the orders: the Office des professions du Québec.

== In France ==
In France, sixteen professions are regulated by an ordinal structure.

Orders of Health Professions:

- Ordre des masseurs-kinésithérapeutes (Council of the Order of Massagers Physiotherapists | Order of Massagers Physiotherapists),
- Ordre des sages-femmes (National Council of the College of Midwives of the College of Midwives)
- Ordre des médecins (Council of the Order of Physicians in France),
- Ordre national des pharmaciens (National Order of Pharmacists),
- National Order of Nurses (Ordre national des infirmiers),
- National Order of Dental Surgeons (Ordre national des chirurgiens dentistes),
- Ordre national des pédicures-podologues (National Order of Pedicures-Podiatrists).

Orders of the legal and judicial professions:

- Conseil national des barreaux (National Council of Bars and Law Societies),
- Conseil supérieur du notariat (High Council of Notaries),
- Ordre des avocats au Conseil d'État et à la Cour de cassation (Bar Association of the Council of State and the Court of Cassation),
- Ordre des avocats de Paris (Paris Bar Association),
- Chambre nationale des huissiers de justice (National Chamber of Judicial Officers).

Orders of technical professions:

- Ordre des architectes (National Council of the Ordre des architectes),
- Ordre des géomètres-experts (Order of surveyors),
- Ordre national des vétérinaires (Order of Veterinarians (France)),
- Conseil Supérieur de l'Ordre des experts-comptables (Order of Chartered Accountants).

== In Portugal ==
In Portugal, the legal framework of professional public associations (associações públicas profissionais) is regulated by Law No. 2/2013 of 10 January. Such associations are called "Order" (Ordem) if they relate to professions whose practice requires prior academic qualification of a university degree, and "Chamber" (Câmara) if otherwise. The President of a Professional Order has the distinctive title of Bastonário (literally, Mace-bearer).

There are currently 18 Professional Orders in Portugal.

== In Quebec (Canada) ==
In the province of Quebec, Canada, the Professional Code of Quebec regulates 46 professional orders and 54 professions, which are governed by the Office des professions du Québec (OPQ). Their fundamental mission is the protection of the public through supervision of the exercise of one or more professions. First adopted in 1973, the code has been amended several times to adapt to the evolution of professional services. As of March 31, 2016, the OPQ was composed of 385,205 professionals, 39.0% of them men and 61.0% of them women. At that time, the Ordre des infirmières et infirmiers (Order of Nurses) (OIIQ) had 74,206 members, the Ordre des ingénieurs du Québec (OIQ) had 62,068 members, and the Ordre des comptables professionnels agrees (OCPAQ) had 37,963 members. See Office des professions du Québec and Professional Code of Quebec.

== See also ==
- Regulatory college
