= List of Canadian tribunals =

This is a list of tribunals in Canada. Tribunals do not necessarily have to be referred to as such in their title, and are also commonly known as "commissions" or "boards."

Tribunals in Canada are established by federal or provincial legislation, and generally refer to any persons or institution with authority to judge, adjudicate on, or determine claims or disputes. An administrative tribunal is a kind of quasi-judicial body that makes decisions on behalf of federal and provincial/territorial governments when it is impractical or inappropriate for the government to do so itself. Appointment to such tribunals is usually by order-in-council.

== Federal tribunals ==
| Name | Area of concern | Description |
|---|---|---|
| Canada Agricultural Review Tribunal | agriculture and agri-food | An independent, quasi-judicial tribunal that reviews agricultural and agri-food administrative monetary penalties issued to those who have allegedly "contravened federal rules pertaining to: the import of animal and plant products; the humane transport of livestock; the use of pesticides; or the inspection of plants, animals and meats." |
| Canada Industrial Relations Board | industrial relations | Promotes constructive labour-management relations in the federally-regulated private sector by "overseeing the acquisition and termination of bargaining rights; resolving unfair labour practice complaints through mediation or adjudication; and assuring the continuity of services necessary to protect public health and safety in the event of a labour dispute." |
| Canadian Broadcast Standards Council | programming of private broadcasters | |
| Canadian Cultural Property Export Review Board | cultural property | The CCPERB is an independent decision-making body that reports to the Ministers of Canadian Heritage and Official Languages. It "determines whether cultural property is of outstanding significance and national importance." |
| Canadian Human Rights Tribunal | human rights | An independent, quasi-judicial tribunal that inquires into allegations of prohibited discrimination under the Canadian Human Rights Act. |
| Canadian International Trade Tribunal | trade | The CITT adjudicates "trade remedy, customs, excise tax, and federal procurement cases." It also inquires into tariff and commercial matters for the Minister of Finance. |
| Copyright Board of Canada | copyright law | |
| Patent Appeal Board | patent law | The Patent Appeal Board of the Canadian Intellectual Property Office, headed by the Commissioner of Patents, is an advisory body primarily concerned with the "review of rejected applications, the review of rejected applications for the reissue of a patent, and determinations of first inventorship in patent conflict situations." |
| Competition Tribunal | competition laws | The CT is an independent specialized tribunal deal with such matters as mergers, misleading advertising, and restrictive trade practices. |
| Environmental Protection Tribunal of Canada | environmental protection | Formerly the Environmental Protection Review Canada, the EPTC is an independent, quasi-judicial tribunal that carries out review hearings of AMPs and Compliance Orders issued by Environment and Climate Change Canada. |
| Federal Public Sector Labour Relations and Employment Board | labour relations, public sector | Established from merging the Public Service Labour Relations Board and the Public Service Staffing Tribunal, the board is a quasi-judicial statutory tribunal that administers the collective bargaining and grievance adjudication systems in the public service as well as in the institutions of Parliament. |
| Immigration and Refugee Board of Canada | immigration & refugee law | |
| Information Commissioner of Canada | access to information | The Office of the Information Commissioner is concerned with the handling of access requests by federal institutions. |
| Investment Industry Regulatory Organization of Canada | | |
| Mutual Fund Dealers Association | | |
| Occupational Health and Safety Tribunal Canada | occupational safety & health | As part of the Employment and Social Development Canada portfolio, this administrative tribunal provides support to appeals officers in occupational health and safety dealing with issues pursuant to the Canada Labour Code. |
| Privacy Commissioner of Canada | | |
| Public Servants Disclosure Protection Tribunal | federal accountability | The PSDPT is responsible for hearing reprisal complaints referred by the Public Sector Integrity Commissioner. |
| Social Security Tribunal of Canada | pensions | The SST is an independent administrative body that makes quasi-judicial decisions on appeals related to the Canada Pension Plan (CPP), Old Age Security (OAS), or Employment Insurance (EI). |
| Specific Claims Tribunal Canada | Indigenous land claims | The SCT is an independent specialized tribunal tasked with deciding issues of "validity and compensation relating to specific claims of First Nations." |
| Trademarks Opposition Board | trademark law | The Trademarks Opposition Board of the Canadian Intellectual Property Office conducts hearings and renders decisions pursuant to the Trademarks Act and Trademarks Regulations. |
| Transportation Appeal Tribunal of Canada | transportation | The TATC provides a "recourse mechanism to the national transportation sector regarding administrative actions taken by the Minister of Transport and the Canadian Transportation Agency under various pieces of federal transportation legislation." |
| Veterans Review and Appeal Board | veterans affairs | |

The Administrative Tribunals Support Service of Canada (ATSSC) is responsible for providing support services and facilities to 11 federal administrative tribunals by way of a single, integrated organization. This organization falls under the purview of the Minister of Justice and Attorney General of Canada.

== Provincial tribunals ==
In areas with provincial jurisdiction, tribunals are administered by the provinces themselves.

=== Alberta tribunals ===
| Name | Area of concern | Description |
|---|---|---|
| Alberta Employment Standards Appeals | employment standards | Formerly called the Alberta Employment Standards Umpire until 2018. |
| Alberta Energy Regulator | | |
| Alberta Environmental Appeal Board | | |
| Alberta Grievance Arbitration Awards | | |
| Alberta Human Rights Commission | human rights | The AHRC is an independent commission that fulfills its mandate of fostering equality and reducing discrimination through tribunals and court hearings, as well as through the resolution and settlement of complaints. |
| Alberta Labour Relations Board | labour laws | The Board administers and interprets Alberta's Labour Relations Code and other union-focused laws. |
| Alberta Land and Property Rights Tribunal | | Formed in 2021 from the merger of the Alberta Land Compensation Board, the Alberta Municipal Government Board, the Alberta Surface Rights Board, and the Alberta New Home Buyer Protection Board |
| Alberta Law Enforcement Review Board | law enforcement | |
| Alberta Public Lands Appeal Board | | |
| Alberta Securities Commission | | |
| Appeals Commission for Alberta Workers' Compensation | workers' compensation | The Appeals Commission, which is independent from the Workers' Compensation Board, is the final level of appeal for workers and employers who disagree with a WCB decision |
| Calgary Subdivision & Development Appeal Board | city planning | The Calgary SDAB is a quasi-judicial board that hears appeals related to decisions made by the City of Calgary subdivision and development authorities. |
| College of Physicians and Surgeons Discipline Committee | medical practice | |
| Land and Property Rights Tribunal | expropriation, property subdivision, intermunicipal disputes | Merger of the Municipal Government Board, Land Compensation Board, Surface Rights Board, and New Home Buyer Protection Board. |
| Law Society of Alberta | legal practice | |
| Metis Settlements Appeal Tribunal | Métis settlements | MSAT is a quasi-judicial body that deals with land and membership disputes, as well as other matters related to Settlement lands. |
| Office of the Information and Privacy Commissioner | information & privacy | |
| Physiotherapy Alberta College Association | | |
| Real Estate Council of Alberta | real estate | |
| SafeRoads Alberta | transportation safety | As the administrative adjudication branch of Alberta Transportation, this tribunal began operations on December 1, 2020, replacing the Alberta Transportation Safety Board. It is responsible for conducting reviews for provincial administrative penalties received by impaired drivers, and vehicle seizures. |

=== British Columbia tribunals ===
| Name | Area of concern |
|---|---|
| British Columbia College of Nurses and Midwives | |
| British Columbia College of Oral Health Professionals | |
| British Columbia Container Trucking Commission | |
| British Columbia Employment Standards Tribunal | employment standards |
| British Columbia Hospital Appeal Board | |
| British Columbia Human Rights Tribunal | human rights |
| British Columbia Liquor and Cannabis Regulation Branch | |
| British Columbia Property Assessment Appeal Board | |
| British Columbia Review Board | |
| British Columbia Securities Commission | |
| British Columbia Workers' Compensation Appeal Tribunal | workers' compensation |
| Building Code Appeal Board | |
| Civil Resolution Tribunal | |
| College of Dental Surgeons of British Columbia | |
| College of Pharmacists of British Columbia | |
| College of Physicians and Surgeons of British Columbia | |
| Community Care and Assisted Living Appeal Board | |
| Energy Resource Appeal Tribunal | |
| Engineers and Geoscientists British Columbia | |
| Environmental Appeal Board | |
| Financial Services Tribunal | |
| Forest Appeals Commission | |
| Health Professions Review Board | |
| Information and Privacy Commissioner | |
| Labour Arbitration Awards | |
| Labour Relations Board | labour relations |
| Law Society of British Columbia | legal practice |
| Office of the Registrar of Lobbyists | |
| Real Estate Council of British Columbia | real estate |
| Registrar of Mortgage Brokers | |
| Skilled Trades BC Appeal Board | |
| Superintendent of Financial Institutions | |
| Superintendent of Pensions | |
| Superintendent of Real Estate | |
| Surface Rights Board of British Columbia | |

=== Manitoba tribunals ===
| Name | Area of concern | Government department | Description |
|---|---|---|---|
| Animal Care Appeal Board | animal care | Manitoba Agriculture | |
| College of Physicians & Surgeons of Manitoba Discipline Committee | | | |
| Cooperative Housing Appeal Tribunal | housing | Manitoba Finance | |
| Clean Environment Commission | environment | Manitoba Environment and Climate | The Commission was established for the purpose of providing advice and recommendations to the Minister of Environment and Climate, and developing and maintaining public participation in environmental matters. |
| Combative Sports Commission | sports | Manitoba Sport, Culture and Heritage | The Combative Sports Commission (formerly Manitoba Boxing Commission) was incorporated on October 16, 1993 to regulate professional boxing and mixed martial arts (MMA) matches in Manitoba in accordance with regulations as set out in the Boxing Act. |
| Denturists Association of Manitoba | | Manitoba Health | |
| Disaster Assistance Appeal Board | disaster assistance | Manitoba Transportation and Infrastructure | The Board is a quasi-judicial tribunal that hears appeals and may provide assistance for disaster assistance. |
| Land Value Appraisal Commission | land value | Consumer Protection and Government Services | The Commission is an independent tribunal that "determines the due compensation payable for government land purchases and expropriations." |
| Manitoba Law Reform Commission | law | Manitoba Justice | |
| Law Society of Manitoba | law | | The LSM is the independent regulator of the legal profession in Manitoba |
| Manitoba Health Appeal Board | health | Manitoba Health | The Board is an independent quasi-judicial administrative tribunal that serves as an appeal body for recipients and providers of health services and others as provided for under The Health Services Insurance Act, The Emergency Response and Stretcher Transportation Act, and The Mental Health Act. |
| Manitoba Human Rights Commission | human rights | Manitoba Justice | |
| Judicial Inquiry Board | | Manitoba Justice | The Board was established to investigate complaints alleging misconduct by Provincial Court judges, judicial justices of the peace, and masters of the Court of King's Bench; and to conduct proceedings before the Judicial Council when charges of misconduct are laid. |
| Manitoba Labour Board | labour relations | Manitoba Labour and Immigration | The Manitoba Labour Board is an independent and autonomous specialist tribunal responsible for the "fair and efficient administration and adjudication of issues brought before it by labour and management concerning rights and responsibilities of the parties under the provisions of The Labour Relations Act, The Employments Standards Code, The Construction Industry Wages Act, The Pay Equity Act, The Workplace Safety and Health Act, and The Essential Services Act." |
| Municipal Board | municipal relations | Manitoba Municipal Relations | The Board is a quasi-judicial tribunal that hears applications, appeals, and referrals pursuant to various statutes of the Legislature including the Municipal Act, the Municipal Assessment Act, The Planning Act, and The Municipal Board Act. |
| Public Utilities Board | public utilities | Consumer Protection and Government Services | The Board is an independent quasi-judicial administrative tribunal responsible for the regulation of public utilities and other matters as defined under the Public Utilities Board Act. |
| Residential Tenancies Commission | real estate | Consumer Protection and Government Services | The Residential Tenancies Commission is a quasi-judicial, specialist tribunal that hears appeals from decisions and orders of the Director of the Residential Tenancies Branch under The Residential Tenancies Act. |
| Manitoba Securities Commission | securities | Manitoba Finance | The Commission is a special operating agency responsible for administering The Securities Act, The Real Estate Brokers Act, The Mortgage Dealers Act, and The Commodity Futures Act. |
| Surface Rights Board | | Manitoba Natural Resources and Northern Development | The Board is a quasi-judicial board that administers and enforces the Surface Rights Act. It is responsible for resolving land access and development disputes between oil and gas development proponents and surface rights holders. |
| Tax Appeals Commission | taxes | Manitoba Finance | |

=== New Brunswick tribunals ===
- Financial and Consumer Services Tribunal
- Law Society of New Brunswick
- New Brunswick Assessment and Planning Appeal Board
- New Brunswick Labour and Employment Board
- New Brunswick Office of the Ombudsman
- Workers' Compensation Appeals Tribunal

=== Newfoundland and Labrador tribunals ===
- College of Physicians and Surgeons of Newfoundland and Labrador
- Information and Privacy Commissioner
- Law Society of Newfoundland and Labrador
- Newfoundland and Labrador Human Rights Commission
- Newfoundland and Labrador Labour Relations Board

=== Nova Scotia tribunals ===
- College of Physicians and Surgeons of Nova Scotia
- Information and Privacy Commissioner of Nova Scotia
- Nova Scotia Barristers' Society Hearing Panel
- Nova Scotia Human Rights Commission
- Nova Scotia Labour Board
- Nova Scotia Labour Relations Board
- Nova Scotia Labour Standards Tribunal
- Nova Scotia Occupational Health and Safety Appeal Panel
- Nova Scotia Police Review Board
- Nova Scotia Securities Commission
- Nova Scotia Serious Incident Response Team
- Nova Scotia Utility and Review Board
- Nova Scotia Workers' Compensation Appeals Tribunal

=== Ontario tribunals ===
- Agriculture, Food & Rural Affairs Appeal Tribunal
- Alcohol and Gaming Commission of Ontario
- Assessment Review Board
- Child and Family Services Review Board
- College of Chiropodists of Ontario
- College of Massage Therapists of Ontario
- College of Nurses of Ontario Discipline Committee
- College of Occupational Therapists of Ontario
- College of Optometrists of Ontario
- College of Physicians and Surgeons of Ontario
- College of Physiotherapists of Ontario
- College of Psychologists of Ontario
- College of Traditional Chinese Medicine Practitioners and Acupuncturists of Ontario
- Condominium Authority Tribunal
- Consent and Capacity Board
- Criminal Injuries Compensation Board
- Financial Services Tribunal
- Grievance Settlement Board
- Health Professions Appeal and Review Board
- Health Services Appeal and Review Board
- Horse Racing Appeal Panel
- Human Rights Tribunal of Ontario
- Information and Privacy Commissioner of Ontario
- Landlord and Tenant Board
- Law Society of Ontario
- Municipal Integrity Commissioners of Ontario
- Normal Farm Practices Protection Board
- Office of the Ombudsman of Ontario
- Ontario Animal Care Review Board
- Ontario Civilian Police Commission
- Ontario College of Early Childhood Educators
- Ontario College of Pharmacists Discipline Committee
- Ontario College of Teachers
- Ontario Condominium Authority
- Ontario Court of the Drainage Referee
- Ontario Custody Review Board
- Ontario Energy Board
- Ontario Fire Safety Commission
- Ontario Labour Relations Board
- Ontario Land Tribunal
- Ontario Licence Appeal Tribunal
- Ontario Pay Equity Hearings Tribunal
- Ontario Physician Payment Review Board
- Ontario Public Service Grievance Board
- Ontario Racing Commission
- Ontario Securities Commission
- Ontario Social Benefits Tribunal
- Ontario Special Education (English) Tribunal
- Public Service Grievance Board
- Workplace Safety and Insurance Appeals Tribunal
- Workplace Safety & Insurance Board

=== Prince Edward Island tribunals ===
- Information and Privacy Commissioner
- Prince Edward Island Human Rights Commission
- Prince Edward Island Labour Relations Board

=== Quebec tribunals ===
| Name | Area of concern | Description |
|---|---|---|
| Administrative Tribunal of Québec | | |
| Bar of Quebec | legal practice | |
| Collège des médecins du Québec | medical practice | |
| Comité de déontologie policière | | |
| Chambre de l'assurance de dommages | | |
| Chambre de la sécurité financière | | |
| Chambre des notaires du Québec | legal practice | |
| Commission d'accès à l'information | access to information | |
| Commission d'appel en matière de lésions professionnelles du Québec | | |
| Commission de la construction du Québec | construction | |
| Commission de la fonction publique | | |
| Commission de protection du territoire agricole du Quebec | | |
| Commission de reconnaissance des associations d'artistes et des associations de producteurs | | |
| Commission des normes, de l’équité, de la santé et de la sécurité du travail | occupational health & safety | CNESST was established in January 2016 from the merger of the Commission de l'équité salariale (QCCES), the Commission de la santé et de la sécurité du travail (QCCSST), and the Commission des normes du travail. |
| Commission des services juridiques | | |
| Commission des transports du Québec | | |
| Commission des valeurs mobilières du Québec | | |
| Commission municipale du Québec | | |
| Conseil de la justice administrative | administrative justice | |
| Conseil de la magistrature | | |
| Conseil des services essentiels | | |
| Corporation des maîtres mécaniciens en tuyauterie du Québec | | "Corporation of Master Pipe-Mechanics of Québec" |
| Guarantee Plan For New Residential Buildings | | |
| Human Rights Tribunal of Quebec | | |
| Office québécois de la langue française | French language | |
| Organisme d’autoréglementation du courtage immobilier du Québec (OACIQ) | real estate | The OACIQ ensures the protection of members of the public who enlist the services of real estate brokerage professionals governed by the Real Estate Brokerage Act. |
| Quebec Autorité des marchés financiers | consumer protection | |
| Régie de l'énergie | | |
| Régie des alcools des courses et des jeux | liquor and lotteries | |
| Régie des marchés agricoles et alimentaires du Québec | | |
| Régie du bâtiment du Québec | building management | |
| Retraite Québec | pensions | This agency was established in January 2016 as a merger of the Régie des rentes du Québec (RRQ) and the Commission administrative des régimes de retraite et d'assurances (CARRA). It also includes all the decisions issued by the Tribunal d’arbitrage (CARRA) before 2016. |
| Tribunal administratif des marchés financiers | | |
| Tribunal administratif du travail | labour relations, occupational safety & health, and essential services | As of 2016, TAT replaced the Commission des relations du travail (CRT) and the Commission des lésions professionnelles (CLP). |
| Tribunal administratif du logement du Québec | rental housing | Formerly known as Régie du logement. |

Other disciplinary councils (conseil de discipline)

- Chambre des huissiers de justice du Québec
- Conseillers et conseillères d'orientation du Québec
- Ordre des acupuncteurs du Québec
- Ordre des administrateurs agréés du Québec
- Ordre des agronomes du Québec
- Ordre des architectes du Québec
- Ordre des arpenteurs-géomètres du Québec
- Ordre des audioprothésistes du Québec
- Ordre des chiropraticiens du Québec
- Ordre des comptables professionnels agréés du Québec
- Ordre des criminologues du Québec
- Ordre des dentistes du Québec
- Ordre des ergothérapeutes du Québec
- Ordre des hygiénistes dentaires du Québec
- Ordre des infirmières et infirmiers auxiliaires du Québec
- Ordre des infirmières et infirmiers du Québec
- Ordre des ingénieurs du Québec
- Ordre des médecins vétérinaires du Québec
- Ordre des opticiens d'ordonnances du Québec
- Ordre des optométristes du Québec
- Ordre des pharmaciens du Québec
- Ordre des podiatres du Québec
- Ordre des psychologues du Québec
- Ordre des sages-femmes du Québec
- Ordre des sexologues du Québec
- Ordre des techniciens et techniciennes dentaires du Québec
- Ordre des technologues en imagerie médicale et en radio-oncologie du Québec
- Ordre des technologues professionnels du Québec
- Ordre des traducteurs, terminologues et interprètes agréés du Québec
- Ordre des urbanistes du Québec
- Ordre professionnel de la physiothérapie du Québec
- Ordre professionnel des chimistes du Québec
- Ordre professionnel des conseillers en ressources humaines et en relations industrielles agrées du Québec
- Ordre professionnel des denturologistes du Québec
- Ordre professionnel des diététistes du Québec
- Ordre professionnel des évaluateurs agréés du Québec
- Ordre professionnel des géologues du Québec
- Ordre professionnel des ingénieurs forestiers du Québec
- Ordre professionnel des inhalothérapeutes du Québec
- Ordre professionnel des orthophonistes et audiologistes du Québec
- Ordre professionnel des technologistes médicaux du Québec
- Ordre professionnel des travailleurs sociaux et des thérapeutes conjugaux et familiaux du Québec
- Ordre des psychoéducateurs et psychoéducatrices du Québec

=== Saskatchewan tribunals ===
| Name | Area of concern | Description |
|---|---|---|
| Agri-Food Council | | The council is an independent board that supervises and monitors all agri-food agencies in Saskatchewan. |
| Automobile Injury Appeal Commission | traffic injury | |
| Athletics Commission of Saskatchewan | sports/athletics | The ACS provides licensing, event permits, and oversight for professional combative sports events in the province. |
| Board of Revenue Commissioners | taxation | This Board hears and determines appeals respecting "taxes imposed or assessed pursuant to and by virtue of any taxing enactment and respecting other monies claimed to be due and payable to the Crown where the right of taking appeal to the Board is given by any statute." |
| Farm Land Security Board | agriculture | This Board is a quasi-judicial tribunal funded and managed as part of the Ministry of Agriculture. |
| Financial and Consumer Affairs Authority of Saskatchewan | consumer protection | |
| Heritage Review Board | heritage property | The HRB "provides a platform for public objections to proposed designations, repeals, alteration, or demolition of designated property." |
| Highway Traffic Board | transportation | The HTB is an independent quasi-judicial administrative tribunal responsible for administering transportation regulatory functions, including hearing appeals for various programs administered by Saskatchewan Government Insurance (SGI). |
| Information and Privacy Commissioner | | |
| Justices of the Peace Compensation Commission | Justices of the peace | This commission is established every four years under The Justices of the Peace Act, 1988, in order to conduct an independent review of salaries, benefits, and pensions for Justices of the Peace. |
| Law Reform Commission of Saskatchewan | law reform | This commission is tasked with reviewing Saskatchewan law, in the interest of its systematic modernization and simplification. |
| Law Society of Saskatchewan | legal practice | |
| Office of the Public Guardian and Trustee | vulnerable people | The Office is responsible for protecting the interests of vulnerable people. |
| Practitioner Staff Appeals Tribunal | | |
| Provincial Capital Commission | provincial heritage | |
| Provincial Mediation Board | debt collection | This Board mediates between debtors and creditors to reach an "amicable arrangement for payment of debt without resorting to legal proceedings." |
| Public and Private Rights Board | land disputes | The PPRB mediates in disputes between landowners and expropriating authorities. |
| Public Service Commission | public service human resources | The PSC is the central human resources body for the Government of Saskatchewan. |
| Saskatchewan Apprenticeship and Trade Certification Commission | apprenticeship | The SATCC oversees and administers the apprenticeship and trade certification system in Saskatchewan. |
| Saskatchewan Assessment Commission | | |
| Saskatchewan College of Pharmacy Professionals | | |
| Saskatchewan Higher Education Quality Assurance Board | higher education | This Board oversees quality assurance reviews of institutions that seek degree-granting status in Saskatchewan. |
| Saskatchewan Human Rights Commission | human rights | |
| Saskatchewan Labour Relations Board | labour relations | The Board administers the Trade Union Act, Construction Industry Labour Relations Act, 1992, the Health Labour Relations Reorganization Act, and the Public Service Essential Services Act, all of which apply to most unionized employees in Saskatchewan. |
| Saskatchewan Local Government Board | | |
| Saskatchewan Master of Titles | | |
| Saskatchewan Municipal Board | local government | The SMB is an administrative tribunal that deals with issues from local government. The SMB also serves as the Board of Revenue Commissioners (BRC). |
| Saskatchewan Office of Residential Tenancies | | |
| Saskatchewan Police Commission | law enforcement | The SPC works with police services and boards of police commissioners to "promote effective policing throughout the province." |
| Saskatchewan Public Complaints Commission | municipal law enforcement | The PCC is a 5-person, non-police body appointed by the Government of Saskatchewan that investigates complaints made against municipal police. |
| Saskatchewan Real Estate Commission | real estate | |
| Saskatchewan Review Board | mental disorder defence | This Board works to determine whether an individual accused of a crime is not criminally responsible or is unfit to stand trial by reason of mental disorder. |
| Surface Rights Board of Arbitration | land rights | The SRBA is a last-resort body that deals with disputes between landowners or occupants and oil/gas or potash operators who are unable to reach an agreement for surface access to private land and related compensation. |
| Workers' Compensation Board | workers' compensation | The Workers' Compensation Board delivers workplace insurance to Saskatchewan employers and benefits to Saskatchewan workers when they are hurt at work. |

== Territorial tribunals ==
=== Northwest Territories ===
- Employment Standards Appeals Office
- Human Rights Adjudication Panel
- Law Society of the Northwest Territories
- Northwest Territories Information and Privacy Commissioner
- Northwest Territories Liquor Licensing Board
- Rental Officer

=== Nunavut ===
- Information and Privacy Commissioner
- Nunavut Human Rights Tribunal
- Nunavut Registrar of Securities

=== Yukon ===
- Education Appeal Tribunal
- Forest Commission
- Surface Rights Board
- Workers' Compensation Appeal Tribunal
- Yukon Human Rights Panel of Adjudicators
