= Ombudsman for Banking Services and Investments =

Canadian financial dispute resolution service

- Abbreviation: OBSI
- Formation: 1996; 30 years ago
- Type: Ombudsman
- Purpose: Financial disputes resolution
- Location: Toronto, Canada
- Region served: Canada
- Services: External dispute resolution
- Members: 600 (2022)
- Website: www.obsi.ca
- Formerly called: Canadian Banking Ombudsman

The Ombudsman for Banking Services and Investments (OBSI) is the Canadian external dispute resolution organization whose responsibility is to handle the financial disputes of consumers and small businesses that could not be resolved by the customers and the financial firms on their own. The OBSI provides the service on an impartial and independent basis, and free of charge to the consumer as an alternative to the legal system.

Individuals and small businesses may contact OBSI with a complaint at no charge to them. If OBSI decides that a firm has acted unfairly or made an error and the customer lost money, it will recommend that the firm pay compensation. OBSI may also recommend other types of non-financial compensation when appropriate. OBSI is a non profit organisation and charges fees to its member financial firms.

== History ==
OBSI was founded in 1996 as the Canadian Banking Ombudsman to review complaints by small business against the chartered banks. In a few short months, the mandate was expanded to cover unresolved consumer complaints as well.

In 2002, as a result of discussions among government, industry and consumer groups about improving consumer protection in financial services, all members of the Investment Industry Regulatory Organization of Canada and the Mutual Fund Dealers Association of Canada joined the organization. At the same time, OBSI invited credit unions to join and changed its name to “Ombudsman for Banking Services and Investments” (OBSI).

In 2013, the Canadian Securities Administrators announced amendments to National Instrument 31-103 Registration Requirements, Exemptions and Ongoing Registrant Obligations (NI 31-103) and Companion Policy 31-103CP Registration Requirements, Exemptions and Ongoing Registrant Obligations that will require all registered dealers and advisers outside of Quebec to use OBSI as their provider of dispute-resolution services. By August 1, 2014, all registered dealers must be members in OBSI, with the effect that OBSI's membership will more than double, to over 1600 participating firms.

Any regulated firm in the banking services and investment fields is eligible to join OBSI.

In September 2018, Scotiabank stopped using OBSI, making it the third big bank, after Toronto-Dominion Bank and the Royal Bank of Canada, to not use OBSI.

In October 2023, “amid a surge in consumer complaints about their banks, the federal Finance department is mandating that the non-profit Ombudsman for Banking Services and Investments (OBSI) serve as the sole provider of external complaint handling.”

== Operation ==
OBSI is Canada's national independent dispute resolution service (ADR) for consumers or small businesses with a complaint they can't resolve with their financial services firm. As a free alternative to the legal system, OBSI works informally and confidentially to find fair outcomes to disputes about banking and investment products and services.

If OBSI decides that a firm has acted unfairly, made an error or given a customer bad advice, and the customer lost money as a result, it will recommend that the firm restore your financial position to where it should have been. OBSI may also recommend other types of non-financial compensation when appropriate. If OBSI thinks a customer has been treated fairly, or the settlement offer the customer has previously received from a firm is fair, OBSI will inform the customer and let them know the reasons why it believes so. While OBSI cannot order a firm to follow a recommendation, OBSI has an excellent record of firms – and clients – accepting its recommendations. OBSI will make public the name of any firm that refuses a recommendation.

The limit for OBSI's recommendations is $350,000. However, if a customer's claim is for an amount higher than $350,000 the customer can voluntarily reduce it.

OBSI is not a regulator, and because OBSI is impartial it does not advocate for consumers or the industry. That also means OBSI doesn't give advice – financial, legal or other. If a customer doesn't like OBSI's findings in a case, the customer is still able to go to a lawyer or seek other ways of resolving the dispute.

== Complaints it will deal with ==
OBSI looks into complaints about most banking and investment matters including:

- mutual funds
- bonds and GICs
- stocks, exchange-traded funds, income trusts and other securities
- investment advice
- unauthorized trading
- fraud
- mortgages
- loans and credit
- debit and credit cards
- fees and rates
- transaction errors
- misrepresentation;
- accounts sent to collections

OBSI is able to make recommendations for amounts up to $350,000.

OBSI currently has more than 600 participating firms in Canada, that include Investment Industry Regulatory Organization of Canada (IIROC) member firms, Mutual Fund Dealers Association of Canada (MFDA) member firms, mutual fund companies, banks, Credit unions and deposit-taking organizations.

== Complaints that it won't deal with ==
If the customer's complaint involves an insurance company, the customer should contact one of the insurance ombudservices to see if they can help. The OmbudService for Life and Health Insurance (OLHI) deals with concerns about life and health insurance, including disability, while the General Insurance Ombudservice (GIO) covers issues of car, property and business insurance.

Along with OBSI, the insurance services are part of the Financial Services OmbudsNetwork, a network of dispute resolution services working to resolve complaints fairly and impartially.

OBSI won't take on a complaint if:

- The customer or the firm has started a court action or arbitration process
- The firm responded to customer’s complaint, and the customer did not bring it to OBSI on a timely basis
- The customer has already settled the complaint by accepting an offer from the firm
- It’s about a general commercial decision of the firm, such as an interest rate or a credit decision

== Governance ==
OBSI's governance structure is designed to ensure the Ombudsman and staff are independent and impartial, and have the necessary resources to carry out their jobs.

A non-profit and independent organization, OBSI is overseen by a Board of Directors. A majority of the directors are independent, and have not been part of industry or government for at least five years. A minority of the directors are appointed from lists of nominees provided by industry bodies. The directors also comprise the voting membership of the organization.

OBSI is headed by the Ombudsman has two teams of investigators: one for Banking Services and the other for Investments. The Ombudsman is also independent of industry and government.

== Funding ==
OBSI levies fees on all of participating firms based on their size or volume of business. OBSI's budget is set each year by the Board of Directors based on the advice of staff.

== International Network of Financial Services Ombudsman Schemes ==
OBSI is a member of the International Network of Financial Services Ombudsman Schemes, a global association whose members operate as out-of-court dispute resolution mechanisms in the financial sector.
