= Glorianne Stromberg =

Canadian lawyer and public official (1939–2023)

Ione Glorianne Felice Stromberg (July 5, 1939 – October 13, 2023) was a Canadian securities lawyer, commissioner of the Ontario Securities Commission, and author of numerous reports, papers and other articles on securities regulation reform in Canada.

Stromberg's reports include Investment Funds in Canada and Consumer Protection, released in 1998, which called for greater transparency and disclosure to retail investors, but she is perhaps best known for her 1995 report on the lack of mutual fund regulation in Canada. The 1995 report triggered the creation of the Mutual Fund Dealers Association of Canada, a self-regulatory organization. Previously, the mutual fund industry had been mostly unregulated, although their peers in brokerages had long been regulated by the Investment Dealers Association of Canada (now being phased out and replaced by the Investment Industry Regulatory Organization of Canada).

Stromberg was also a frequent media commentator, and public speaker, and has advised retail investors to "streetproof" themselves in their dealings with the financial services industry.

Stromberg died on October 13, 2023, at the age of 84.
