= Fellow of the Canadian Securities Institute =

The Fellow of CSI (FCSI) is the highest credential offered by the Canadian Securities Institute (CSI)

The Fellow of CSI is held by a small number of financial services professionals in Canada who have met standards for industry experience, advanced education, ethics and who have been endorsed by peers and superiors. As of fall 2011, 3,380 Canadian financial services professional held an FCSI. At the end of 2012, there were 3,500 FCSIs in good standing. A maximum of two individuals per year may also be awarded an Honorary FCSI. To date there have been 17 Honorary FCSIs awarded.

A list of active FCSIs is maintained in the FCSI Directory. The FCSI Advisory Council's mandate is to ensure continued growth and promotion of the FCSI, improve protection to the public who rely on the knowledge and competence of FCSI holders, and act as key ambassadors and mentors within the financial services community.

== Prerequisites ==
To earn the FCSI, candidates must already hold and maintain one or more of the following designations:

- Personal Financial Planner (PFP)
- Chartered Strategic Wealth Professional (CSWP)
- Chartered Investment Manager (CIM)
- Canadian Investment Manager (CIM)
- MTI Estate and Trust Professional (MTI)
- Derivatives Market Specialist (DMS)
- Financial Management Advisor (FMA)
- Fellow, Institute of Canadian Bankers (FICB)
- Certified Financial Planner (CFP)
- Chartered Financial Analyst (CFA)
- Chartered Life Underwriter (CLU)

The Fellow of CSI (FCSI) is the highest distinction offered by the Canadian Securities Institute.

== Work Experience Requirement ==
To be eligible for the FCSI, a candidate must have a minimum of seven years of financial services work experience within the last 10 years of his/her career.

== Education Path ==
An FCSI candidate who has the required prerequisite designation (or designations) must take two additional eligible courses from a different stream than that required for the designation(s) already held. A list is posted by the Canadian Securities Institute to identify which courses may/may not be used depending on the designation(s) already held by an FCSI candidate.

In addition, all FCSI candidates must also take Financial Services Industry: Business Drivers and Challenges (FSDC). The FSDC course provides an understanding of the broader economic role and related public policy considerations of the financial services industry and how trust and confidence in the industry affect it.

== Certification ==
Besides holding a pre-requisite designation and taking the additional required courses, a candidate for the FCSI must receive endorsement from a direct supervisor and from a sponsor who is a practising FCSI. This latter requirement is unique to the FCSI; it is not mandated by any other credential offered by the Canadian Securities Institute. Additionally, FCSIs may fulfil their industry contribution requirements by serving as mentors to other financial services professionals.

== Code of Ethics ==
FCSIs must formally sign a Code of Ethics specific to the FCSI every year. Adherence to the FCSI Code of Ethics is monitored through reviews and periodic audits of Fellows’ annual commitment and declaration, public complaints, and tracking of news and regulatory reports.

Allegations of violation of the FCSI Code of Ethics are handled by the Ethics Committee according to the FCSI Ethical Misconduct Disciplinary Process. If the Ethics Committee determines a violation occurred, a disciplinary sanction is recommended.

== Maintaining the Credential ==
FCSIs are required to contribute to the financial services industry and the public through:

- Speaking engagements
- Written/academic contributions
- Committee involvement
- Community involvement (charitable work)
- Mentoring

A minimum of 12 hours annually, outside of an FCSI's primary job function, is mandated to fulfil the industry contribution requirement (detailed examples of qualifying contributions are posted online). FCSIs must retain supporting documents to confirm completion of industry contribution credits and are subject to an annual audit against their claims. Many FCSIs fulfil part of their industry contribution by participation in Junior Achievement's financial literacy educational programs "Economics for Success" and "Dollars With Sense." Last year, 76 FCSIs volunteered across Canada to deliver programs to 2,040 Junior Achievement students in 68 classrooms.

== Honorary FCSI program ==
Under special circumstances, the Canadian Securities Institute may award an honorary FCSI to recognize distinguished leadership in financial services. Each year, the FCSI Advisory Council may select a maximum of two individuals to receive an honorary FCSI. Any active FCSI may nominate candidates for an honorary FCSI. Each candidate must meet the stated eligibility requirements to be considered for an honorary FCSI.

In October 2004, two Canadian financial experts and media commentators were presented with the honorary FCSI: Patricia Lovett-Reid of TD Waterhouse and Fred Ketchen of Scotia McLeod. In 2011, Roberta Wilton, PhD, formerly president of CSI Global Education Inc., was awarded the Honorary FCSI.
