= Wealthsimple =

Canadian investment management company

Wealthsimple Inc.
- Type: Private
- Industry: Financial services; Online investment management
- Founded: September 2014; 12 years ago
- Founders: Michael Katchen (CEO); Rudy Adler (CMO); Brett Huneycutt (CPO)
- Headquarters: Toronto, Ontario, Canada
- Services: Robo-advisor; Stockbroker; Electronic trading platform
- AUM: CA$155.6 billion (2026)
- Owner: Power Corporation of Canada (52.4%)
- Number of employees: >1000 (2025)
- Website: www.wealthsimple.com

Wealthsimple Inc. is a Canadian online investment management service. The firm was founded in September 2014 by Michael Katchen, Brett Huneycutt, and Rudy Adler and is based in Toronto. As of November 5, 2025, the firm holds over C$170 billion in assets under administration. It is primarily owned by Power Corporation, which holds a 52.4% undiluted stake aggregated through three entities: its wholly-owned subsidiary (Power Financial), its majority-owned subsidiary (IGM Financial), and its controlled alternative asset platform (Sagard's Portage Ventures).

== History ==
=== Pre-founding ===
Prior to founding Wealthsimple, Michael Katchen worked for 1000Memories, a Silicon Valley–based startup. After Ancestry.com bought 1000Memories in 2012, Katchen developed a spreadsheet with tips to help his colleagues set up investment portfolios. Interest in the spreadsheet helped inspire the idea for Wealthsimple. In 2014, he returned to Toronto to launch the company.

=== 2015 acquisition of Canadian ShareOwner Investments Inc. ===
In December 2015, Wealthsimple merged with Canadian ShareOwner Investments Inc., a Canadian order-execution only broker-dealer. Through the acquisition, Wealthsimple became an owner of one of Canada's 14 discount brokerages (2015) alongside other owners of discount brokerages including Bank of Montreal and Royal Bank of Canada. The acquisition of Canadian ShareOwner Investment Inc. resulted in the assets under management comprising CA$400,000,000 across 10,000 customer accounts.

=== Since 2016: focus on product offerings ===
In 2015, Product Hunt Toronto honoured Wealthsimple with its first-ever Product of the Year Award. In 2016, the 20th Annual Webby Awards named Wealthsimple its Best Financial Services/Banking website.

In March 2016, Wealthsimple began offering clients access to socially responsible investment funds.

In May 2016, the firm announced a partnership with Mint, thus allowing clients to sync their Wealthsimple investment account to Mint's budgeting software. Also, that month, Wealthsimple launched Wealthsimple for Advisors, an automated platform for financial advisors. The service is intended for advisors who wish to maintain clients with accounts below their minimum requirements.

On April 5, 2018, the firm launched Wealthsimple Save, a high-interest savings account offering a rate higher than those available at the large Canadian banks at the time. Wealthsimple Trade, a zero-commission stock and exchange-traded fund (ETF) trading mobile app, was available as a beta in August 2018 and publicly launched in March 2019.

As of March 2019, Wealthsimple publicly supports Wealthica synchronization via their secure, open API.

In January 2020, Wealthsimple launched Wealthsimple Cash for Canadian customers, a hybrid savings/chequing account offering high interest on balances. Spending features such as a Visa Debit card, e-transfers, bill payments, and paycheque/cheque deposits are planned to be rolled out through 2020.

As of March 2020, Wealthsimple Trade became unable to handle the volume of trades their customers were placing and began capping the number of users and putting some investors on to waitlists.

In November that year, Wealthsimple Cash transitioned from a savings account to a peer-to-peer cash transfer app. Having first launched in beta, the app was made widely available in March 2021.

On July 8, 2021, Wealthsimple Trade announced that they would launch fractional shares in the platform, starting the next day.

In October 2022, Wealthsimple announced that it had become Canada's first nonbank, non-credit-union to be approved for a direct settlement account by the Bank of Canada, paving the way for its access to Canada's future real-time-rail payment system.

In October 2024, Wealthsimple launched their own travel eSIM with Gigs. The following year, the company surpassed $100 billion CAD in total assets under administration (AUA).

== Products and services ==
=== Invest ===
Wealthsimple Invest is the company's automated investing service, which manages users' investments via a personalized portfolio of low-fee exchange-traded funds.

Via Wealthsimple for Advisors and also for firms via Wealthsimple for Work, Wealthsimple combines a robo-advisor platform with access to live advisors. Each client is provided an investment advisor who helps match investments to the client's long-term goals and risk tolerance.

In September 2018, the company started offering a micro-investing service called Roundup, which automatically rounds up purchases and invests the extra change into one's Wealthsimple investment account.

Micro-investing is a type of investment strategy that is designed to make investing regular, accessible and affordable, especially for those who may not have a lot of money to invest or who are new to investing.

=== Chequing ===
Wealthsimple Chequing (formerly called Wealthsimple Cash) is a peer-to-peer cash transfer platform.

In April 2018, the company began offering Smart Savings (later known as Wealthsimple Save), an interest-earning savings account.

In January 2020, the company launched Wealthsimple Cash for Canadian customers, a hybrid savings/chequing account offering high interest on balances. That November, Wealthsimple Cash transitioned from a savings account to a peer-to-peer cash transfer app.

On March 29, 2021, Wealthsimple simplified the names of their products and how users see their accounts. Since the update, users are only able to have one Wealthsimple Cash account, and any accounts that are not connected to the Wealthsimple Cash app now appear as Wealthsimple Save.

In May 2025, the company phased out their Save and Smart Savings account. In June 2025, Cash accounts were renamed to Wealthsimple Chequing accounts.

In January 2026 Wealthsimple added the ability to deposit Canadian cash via Canada Post

In May 2026, at an event in Calgary, Wealthsimple announced an expansion into family and business banking. Households, available immediately, lets clients view household finances across chequing, investment and mortgage accounts held at Wealthsimple or elsewhere. A kids and teens account, structured as a trust account owned by the parent, lets parents raise the interest rate on a child's account and pay the difference themselves, and an authorized trader feature lets clients trade on behalf of another person such as a spouse or parent. The company also expanded its business offering to include chequing accounts, a credit card, U.S. dollar accounts and business lines of credit, and announced a U.S. dollar chequing account for personal clients.

In May 2026, Wealthsimple launched Monthly Millionaire, a recurring prize-linked savings promotion for clients. Clients earn 500 entries for opening a chequing account and one entry for each dollar of net deposits, with entries doubled for clients who set up direct deposit and 5,000 entries for each successful referral. Each edition runs about four to five weeks with weekly draws, and grand prizes have included CA$1,000,000 in cash. Investment Executive compared the program to the United Kingdom's Premium Bonds.

=== Credit Card ===
In June 2025 Wealthsimple launched a Visa credit card product and announced a line of credit offering Visa Infinite tier cards. Later on Wealthsimple added a Visa Infinite Privilege.

=== Trade and Crypto ===
Wealthsimple Trade is a self-directed investment platform, allowing users to buy and sell various individual stocks and exchange-traded funds (ETFs) on major Canadian and U.S. exchanges. This platform was introduced in March 2019, offering a stock and ETF trading account with zero-commission fees in the U.S. and Canada. Wealthsimple Trade was the first commission-free trading platform in Canada.

Wealthsimple Crypto is the company's platform for buying and selling several cryptocurrencies, including BTC and ETH. This service is offered through the same app/web portal as Trade. Much like Trade, this service has no fees. WealthSimple Crypto now allows users to deposit and withdraw select cryptocurrencies to and from self-custody wallets.

=== Tax ===
Wealthsimple Tax (formerly SimpleTax) is an all-in-one tax preparation and filing platform.

SimpleTax was founded in 2012 by Allison Suter, Jonathan Suter, and Justin Reynen. Wealthsimple acquired the platform in September 2019. The acquisition of SimpleTax added online tax-return preparation and filing service to Wealthsimple's suite of financial products.

== Current operations ==
=== Assets under management ===
In December 2023, Mike Katchen announced the company is targeting CA$100B in assets under administration within five years. In October 2025, Michael Katchen announced that Wealthsimple had reached CA$100B in assets under administration 3 years ahead of schedule.

Year	# of Clients (excluding tax filers)	AUM (CA$)
2026 June 30	3.6 million	156 billion
2025 Dec 31	3.2 million	111 billion
2024 Dec 31	2.6 million	64 billion
2023 Dec 31	2.2 million	31 billion
2022 Dec 31	2 million	18.3 billion
2021 Dec 31	1.6 million	18.8 billion
2020 Dec 31	500,000	9.7 billion
2019 Dec 31	250,000	6.3 billion
2018 Dec 31	100,000	3.4 billion
2018 Oct 10	100,000	3 billion
2018 Feb 21	65,000	1.9 billion
2017 May 11	30,000	1 billion
2017 Jan 10	15,000	750 million
2015 Dec 2	10,000	400 million
2015 April 10	1,000	

=== Funding ===
In May 2014, the company raised CA$1.9 million from investors Eric Kirzner, Joe Canavan, and Roger Martin.

In April 2015, the firm received $10 million from Power Financial Corporation in an agreement structured to allow for a future investment of $20 million within 12 months. In total, Power Financial Corporation has invested $30 million in Series A funding. It is now primarily owned by Power Corporation indirectly at 77.4% (the investments were through their holdings in Power Financial, IGM Financial, and Portag3).

In October 2020, Wealthsimple raised $114 million (US$87 million) in funding from an investor group led by Technology Crossover Ventures, in addition to Greylock Partners, Meritech Capital Partners, Two Sigma Ventures, and Allianz X.

In May 2021, Wealthsimple announced a $750 million CAD financing round at a post-money valuation of $5 billion CAD, co-led by Meritech Capital Partners and Greylock Partners. Other investors included DST Global, ICONIQ Capital, Dragoneer Investment Group, TCV, iNovia Capital, Allianz X, and celebrity investors including Drake, Michael J. Fox, and Ryan Reynolds.

In October 2025, Wealthsimple raised $750 million CAD in a Series F round at a post-money valuation of $10 billion CAD, co-led by Dragoneer Investment Group and GIC. The round included new investor CPP Investments, and existing investors Power Corporation of Canada, IGM Financial, ICONIQ Capital, Greylock Partners, and Meritech Capital Partners.

== See also ==
- List of electronic trading platforms
