= Canadian Investment Regulatory Organization =

Canadian self-regulatory organization for investments

- L’Organisme canadien de réglementation des investissements
- Abbreviation: CIRO/OCRI
- Formation: 2023
- Type: Self-Regulatory Organization (SRO)
- Legal status: active
- Purpose: Monitors members for securities law compliance; enforces securities regulations through quasi-judicial proceedings
- Headquarters: Suite 2600, Bay Adelaide North, 40 Temperance Street, Toronto, Ontario, Canada
- Region served: Canada
- Official language: English, French
- CEO, President: Andrew J. Kriegler
- Chair: Miranda Hubbs
- Budget: C$149.576M (FY 2024)
- Website: www.ciro.ca

The Canadian Investment Regulatory Organization (CIRO; Organisme canadien de réglementation des investissements or OCRI in French) is a non-profit, national self-regulatory organization (SRO). Established through the merger of the Investment Industry Regulatory Organization of Canada (IIROC) and Mutual Fund Dealers Association (MFDA) on January 1, 2023, CIRO oversees all investment dealers, mutual funds, and trading activity on debt and equity markets in Canada.

The organization sets regulatory and investment industry standards and has quasi-judicial powers in that it holds enforcement hearings and has the power to suspend, fine and expel members and their representatives.

== History ==
CIRO was formed on January 1, 2023, through the merger of the Investment Industry Regulatory Organization of Canada (IIROC) and Mutual Fund Dealers Association (MFDA) as the New Self-Regulatory Organization of Canada (New SRO).

On April 24, 2023, the name of the Canadian Investment Regulatory Organization (CIRO) was approved by its members.

== Management ==
Andrew J. Kriegler has been the president and chief executive officer of CIRO since January 1, 2023, after having served on the same position in IIROC since 2014.

Miranda Hubbs is an independent director having served on the CIRO Board of Directors since 2023. On March 26, 2025, she was unanimously appointed as the Chair of the board.

== Operations ==
CIRO operates under Recognition Orders from the Canadian Securities Administrators (CSA), which is the umbrella for Canada's provincial and territorial securities regulators. CIRO is subject to CSA oversight and regular operational reviews. It operates according to its By-Law No. 1.

== Controversies ==
=== Cybersecurity breach (2025) ===
On August 11, 2025, the Canadian Investment Regulatory Organization (CIRO) confirmed a cybersecurity breach that compromised the personal information of approximately 750,000 investors. CIRO offered affected individuals two years of credit monitoring and identity theft protection. While there was no evidence that the compromised data had been misused, the incident raised concerns regarding CIRO's ability to safeguard sensitive investor information.

=== Ali Reza Sultani v. IIROC ===
On November 27, 2019, the Quebec Financial Markets Administrative Tribunal overturned a decision by the Investment Industry Regulatory Organization of Canada (IIROC) that had sanctioned Ali Reza Sultani for allegedly making false statements about his dismissal from a previous firm. The tribunal determined that IIROC's enforcement action was duplicative and constituted an abuse of process, as the organization had previously granted Sultani registration while aware of the issues.

=== Robert Adrian Crandall v. IIROC ===
In November 2019, the New Brunswick Court of Appeal reinstated IIROC's disciplinary decision against Robert Adrian Crandall. The ruling overturned a prior tribunal decision that had vacated sanctions due to alleged procedural unfairness. The court concluded that IIROC had fulfilled its disclosure obligations and that the tribunal's process demonstrated a reasonable apprehension of bias against IIROC.

=== Mark Odorico v. IIROC ===
On October 16, 2023, the Ontario Capital Markets Tribunal partially upheld an appeal by Mark Odorico against an IIROC decision from March 2022 that had found him guilty of misappropriating client funds. The tribunal found that IIROC had overlooked key evidence, including a promissory note indicating that funds received from clients may have been structured as loans. As a result, part of the sanctions, including a $150,000 reduction in disgorgement, were set aside.

=== CIRO panel revokes third-party order ===
On January 13, 2025, a CIRO hearing panel revoked its own order requiring Fidelity Clearing Canada ULC to produce records in an enforcement proceeding against Echelon Wealth Partners Inc. and one of its representatives. The reversal was made on procedural grounds, indicating a reassessment of the panel's earlier decision.

=== CIRO v. Englesby and Nishimura ===
On April 7, 2025, a jurisdictional challenge arose in CIRO v. Englesby and Nishimura. The British Columbia Securities Commission determined that CIRO staff lacked standing to seek a hearing and review, referencing precedent from Bahcheli v. Alberta (Securities Commission), which requires an appellant to be directly affected by a decision.

== See also ==
- Canadian securities regulation
- Universal Market Integrity Rules
- List of financial supervisory authorities by country
