= Canadian Securities Institute =

Canadian organization

Canadian Securities Institute (CSI Global Education Inc.)
- Type: Private Education Institution
- Established: 1970
- Location: (Canada) Toronto: 200 Wellington Street West Toronto, ON M5V 3C7 Montreal: 625 René-Lévesque Blvd West, Suite 400, Montreal, QC H3B 1R2, Canada
- Website: csi.ca

The Canadian Securities Institute (CSI; formerly, CSI Global Education) is a Canadian organization that offers licensing courses, advanced certifications, continuing education and custom training for financial services professionals in Canada and internationally.

CSI provides licensing and testing to meet the regulatory requirements to work within the Canadian financial services industry. It is endorsed by the Investment Industry Regulatory Organization of Canada (IIROC), and Canadian Securities Administrators (CSA).

CSI is based in Toronto and Montreal and owned by Fitch Learning. The credentials offered by the institute are recognized by several foreign securities regulators, including those in the U.S., France, U.K., Singapore and Hong Kong.

== Courses, programs and certificates ==
The Canadian Securities Institute offers 100 courses, 11 certificate programs, specialized designations, as well as continuing education programs for Canadian financial professionals, primarily in the area of financial advice.

CSI offers programs and courses through a variety of formats including distance (primarily online) and in class, to make them as accessible as possible. Some courses are available through Ontario community colleges (e.g., Fanshawe College in London, Ontario and Centennial College in Toronto). The PFP may be applied to an MBA (Financial Services) at Dalhousie University.

== Specialist certificates ==
The 11 specialist certificates offered by the Canadian Securities Institute are intended to provide specialized knowledge in a specific aspect of financial/investment management. Some are stand-alone; some provide interim qualifications for pursuing a designation. They are:

- Retirement Strategy
- Investment Dealer Compliance
- Financial Services Advice
- Estate Planning and Trust Strategy
- Derivatives Market Strategies
- Small Business Advisory
- Advanced Investment Advice
- Fixed Income Trading and Sales
- Equity Trading and Sales
- Advanced Mutual Funds Advice
- Personal Banking

== Designations ==
The Canadian Securities Institute offers these specialized designations and distinctions:

=== PFP – Personal Financial Planner ===
Comprehensive financial advice designation prevalent in financial institutions. It is recognized across Canada except Quebec and is accredited under ISO 17024*. (CSI also provides the education that meets Quebec's provincial requirements and leads to the IQPF Financial Planning Exam and to earning the Financial Planner (Pl. Fin.) designation.)

=== CIM – Chartered Investment Manager ===
Designation enabling investment professionals to meet regulatory requirements for providing discretionary portfolio management services in Canada.

=== Certified International Wealth Manager (CIWM) ===
Designation for investment advisors, financial advisors, financial planners and life insurance specialists, working within a securities firm, bank, or a financial planning organization who provide financial counsel to affluent clients.

=== Fellow of Canadian Securities Institute (FCSI) ===
This is the highest credential and honour bestowed by the Canadian Securities Institute. At the end of 2012, the Fellow of CSI was held in good standing by 3,469 financial services professionals. A maximum of two individuals per year may be awarded an honorary FCSI.

=== MTI – Estate and Trust Professional ===
For advanced estate and trust professionals, working in trust companies and law or accounting firms with some high level wealth management specialists, e.g., trust/tax officers, senior trust officers, estate planners and trust administrators. The MTI designation was introduced in 1976. In its 2012 Advisors' Report Card, Investment Executive found that 12.3% of financial advisors overall held the CIM, 10.3% held the PFP and 10.2% were recognized as Fellows of the Canadian Securities Institute.

== International education activities ==
Besides providing financial education within Canada, CSI partners with organizations worldwide to provide financial proficiency training in China, Europe, the Middle East, Central America and the Caribbean. CSI designations are recognized by regulatory authorities, financial organizations and associations in Canada and internationally. CSI operates 150 exam centres worldwide.

Between 2005 and 2010, CSI had trained more than 1,000 financial professionals in China. It opened its first office in China – in Shanghai – in 2009.

== History ==
CSI was established as the "Canadian Securities Institute" in 1970 by Canadian financial self-regulatory organizations (SROs) and changed its name in 2002 after incorporating as a for-profit entity under the name CSI Global Education Inc. It is more commonly known as the Canadian Securities Institute.

- 1964: Canadian Securities Course is first offered.
- 1970: Established as the Canadian Securities Institute. More than 750,000 financial services professionals had taken its courses to the end of 2012.
- 1976: Fellowship of the Canadian Securities Institute (FCSI) was introduced Member, Trust Institute (MTI) designation is introduced.
- 1993: Development of new designations in financial planning and portfolio management launched. Expanded beyond securities industry to serve training needs of banks, mutual fund dealers and universities.
- 1999: First roster of Internet-based courses launched on CSI's website.
- 2000: Specialized designation introduced to certify financial derivatives specialists. First such designation offered internationally.
- 2001: One of 10 educational providers in Canada granted accreditation to provide life insurance licensing to Canadian students.
- 2003: Canadian Securities Institute is renamed CSI Global Education Inc. As of 2012, CSI resumed using "Canadian Securities Institute".
- 2005: Canada-China initiatives launched. Developed with the Securities Association of China (SAC), it brings Chinese financial services professionals to Toronto for educational programs (basic to advanced).
- 2006: Acquired by investment firm Onex Corporation in January.
- 2007: Institute of Canadian Bankers (ICB) is acquired by CSI. Enables CSI to provide extended financial services training and educational courses. Begins to offer advanced educational courses in licensing and compliance training in banking, investment, wealth management, insurance, trust and management studies.
- 2010: Acquired by Moody's Corporation for $CDN 155 million. CSI operates as part of the Training and Certification arm of Moody's Analytics.
- 2011: Eleven (11) course bundles introduced by CSI to help professionals obtain various designations. These include the Personal Financial Planner (PFP), CIM and Certified Financial Planner designations. Canadian Investment Manager designation renamed in September 2011 to Chartered Investment Manager (CIM) to improve portability outside Canada.
- 2012: Canadian Securities Institute and its Personal Financial Planner (PFP) designation receive ISO 17024 accreditation through the American National Standards Institute (ANSI).

== ISO accreditation ==
The Canadian Securities Institute and its PFP designation received ISO 17024 (International Organization for Standardization) accreditation from the ANSI (American National Standards Institute) simultaneously on June 28, 2012.

ISO 17024 establishes standards for "personal certifications" – i.e., professional designations. ISO 17024 accreditation signifies that CSI and the PFP program meet the requirements to be a credentialing organization (rather than merely an educator/examiner).

== Partner and industry relationships ==
The Canadian Securities Institute (CSI) has established partnerships and/or industry relationships with a variety of organizations:

- IIROC (Investment Industry Regulatory Organization of Canada): Completing specific CSI courses is a requirement for meeting IIROC's registration categories.
- MFDA (Mutual Fund Dealers' Association of Canada): Application requirements for mutual fund salesperson licensing are met by completing the Canadian Securities Course (CSC) or Investment Funds in Canada Course (IFIC). Branch Compliance Officer licensing requirements are met by completing the Branch Compliance Officer's Course.
- IFIE (International Forum for Investor Education): CSI is a member of IFIE, a non-commercial, private sector organization that seeks to improve investor education around the world.
- CFP (Certified Financial Planner): CSI offers three approved core and advanced curriculum routes that lead to FP Canada Institute's pre-certification education.
- CMT (Chartered Market Technician) Advanced standing in the CMT Program is achieved by students who complete CSI's Technical Analysis Course.
- PRMIA (Professional Risk Managers' International Association): Exemption from Exam 1 of the PRM certification program is granted to those who complete CSI's Financial Markets Risk Management Course.
- STEP (Society of Trust and Estate Practitioners): Exemption from the Wills, Trust & Administration course within the STEP Diploma program is granted to those who complete CSI's MTI designation.
- Mortgage Professionals Canada: Qualification for the AMP designation is possible completion of a required course in residential mortgage lending and the Mortgage Professionals Canada Ethics Module.
