= FMA =

FMA may refer to:

== Arts and entertainment ==
- Faroese Music Awards
- Free Music Archive, a website
- Fullmetal Alchemist, Japanese manga series
- Festival du Monde Arabe de Montréal
- FMA (album), a 2016 album by Grace

== Science and technology ==
- Fused multiply–add, a floating-point multiply–add operation
  - FMA instruction set, in the x86 microprocessor instruction set
- Foundational Model of Anatomy

== Law ==
- Financial Management and Accountability Act 1997, of Australia
- Federal Marriage Amendment, a failed proposed US Constitutional amendment

== Organizations ==
- Fabricators & Manufacturers Association, International
- Fábrica Militar de Aviones, later Fábrica Argentina de Aviones, an aircraft manufacturer
- Monegasque Athletics Federation (French: Fédération monégasque d'athlétisme)
- Mozambican Athletics Federation (Portuguese: Federação Moçambicana de Atletismo)
- FMA Architects, Nigeria
- Financial Market Authority (Liechtenstein)
- Financial Markets Authority (New Zealand)
- Forestville Military Academy, in Maryland, US
- Foundation for Media Alternatives
- Future Media Architects, an internet development company

== Other uses ==
- Financial management advisor
- Filipino martial arts
- Fellow of the Museums Association
- Formosa International Airport (IATA code), Argentina
- First-mover advantage
- Ferry Monster Autosport, a Dutch auto racing team
- February, March, April, a 3-month season period
