= Alberta Human Rights Commission =

Canadian human rights authority

Commission overview
- Type: Independent human rights commission
- Headquarters: 800 - 10405 Jasper Ave NW, Edmonton, AB T5J 4R7 620 - 7 Ave SW Calgary, AB T2P 0Y8
- Motto: Fostering equality and reducing discrimination
- Annual budget: $6.918 m CAD (2023)
- Minister responsible: Mickey Amery, Minister of Justice
- Commission executive: Zabeda Yaqoob KC, Chief of the Commission and Tribunals
- Key document: Alberta Human Rights Act
- Website: albertahumanrights.ab.ca

The Alberta Human Rights Commission (AHRC) is a quasi-judicial human rights commission in Alberta, Canada, created by the provincial government.

The Commission was established under and tasked with administering the Alberta Human Rights Act (AHRA). Its mandate is to reduce discrimination in Alberta "through the resolution and settlement of complaints of discrimination, and through human rights tribunal and court hearings." In relation to complaint resolution and settlement, the primary purpose of the tribunals is adjudicative.

It is headed by the Chief of the Commission and Tribunals, who is tasked with informing Alberta's Minister of Justice of human rights issues, as well as providing guidance to Commission members regarding such functions as their tribunal hearings, and to the Commission director regarding the overall objective of the Commission. Both the Chief and Commission members are appointed by Order in Council.

The AHRC differs from the Canadian Human Rights Commission (CHRC), which deals with complaints relating to treatment by the federal government or a federally-regulated business.

== Organization ==
The functions of the Commission are laid out in the Alberta Human Rights Act. In particular, section 16(1) states that the function of the Commission is:

(a) to forward the principle that all persons are equal in dignity, rights and responsibilities without regard to race, religious beliefs, colour, gender, gender identity, gender expression, physical disability, mental disability, age, ancestry, place of origin, marital status, source of income, family status or sexual orientation,

(b) to promote awareness and appreciation of and respect for the multicultural heritage of Alberta society,

(c) to promote an environment in which all Albertans can participate in and contribute to the cultural, social, economic and political life of Alberta,

(d) to encourage all sectors of Alberta society to provide equality of opportunity,

(e) to research, develop and conduct educational programs designed to eliminate discriminatory practices related to race, religious beliefs, colour, gender, gender identity, gender expression, physical disability, mental disability, age, ancestry, place of origin, marital status, source of income, family status or sexual orientation,

(f) to promote an understanding of, acceptance of an compliance with this Act,

(g) to encourage and coordinate both public and private human rights programs and activities, and

(h) to advise the Minister on matters related to this Act.

=== Members and leadership ===
The Commission is headed by the Chief of the Commission and Tribunals, who advises Alberta's Minister of Justice on human rights issues, guides Members of the Commission in tribunal hearings, and directs the overall objectives of the Commission. Section 15 of the Alberta Human Rights Act stipulates that the Chief and members of the Commission are appointed by the Lieutenant Governor in Council.

As of July 2025, Zabeda Yaqoob KC serves as the Chief of the Commission and Tribunals.

Previous chiefs include:

- Kathryn Oviatt, K.C. – November 2022 – January 2025
- Dr. Evaristus Oshionebo – September 2022 – November 2022
- Collin May – July 2022 – September 2022
- Kathryn Oviatt, K.C. – January 2022 – July 2022
- Michael Gottheil – August 2018 – January 2022
- William D. McFetridge (acting) – August 2017 – August 2018
- Robert A. Philp – July 1, 2014 – June 30, 2017
- David Blair Mason – 2009–2014
- Brenda F. Scragg (acting) – 2008–2009
- Charlach Mackintosh – 1994–2008
- Jack O'Neil – 1993–1994
- Fil B. Fraser – 1989–1992
- Stan Scudder – 1986–1989
- Marlene Antonio – 1981–1986
- Bob Lundrigan – 1979–1981
- Max Wyman – 1973–1979

As of March 2025, the appointed Members of the Alberta Human Rights Commission are:

- Rabie Ahmed Abdelhamid
- Nduka Ahanonu
- Sandra Badejo
- Faraz Bawa
- Doris Bonora, K.C.
- Dana Christianson
- Cynthia Dickins, K.C.
- Jessica Gill
- Teresa Haykowsky, K.C.
- Shawn Leclerc
- Erika Ringseis
- Karen Scott
- Leigh Sherry
- Wilma Shim
- Nathalie Whyte
- Rod Wiltshire

Source: [Alberta Human Rights Commission – Our People](https://albertahumanrights.ab.ca/what-are-human-rights/about-the-commission/our-people/)

=== Indigenous Advisory Circle ===
The Alberta Human Rights Commission established an Indigenous Advisory Circle in August 2021 to assist the Commission with the implementation of its Indigenous Human Rights Strategy. The Circle provides advice and guidance on best practices, community engagement, and priority actions.

The Circle is composed of 12 Indigenous individuals from across the province. Members are chosen through an open competition process. In selecting Circle members, the Commission strives to include people with diverse experience and expertise (including women, 2SLGBTQ+ individuals, and persons with disabilities) from multiple cultural backgrounds. The Commission also strives to ensure the Circle includes both urban and rural perspectives.

=== Tribunal ===
The quasi-judicial Tribunal office is the independent adjudicative arm of the Alberta Human Rights Commission. Members of the Commission (who serve on human rights tribunals) are neither employees of the Government of Alberta or the Commission; they are private citizens appointed by the Lieutenant Governor in Council.

== Controversial decisions ==
=== Mihaly v The Association of Professional Engineers and Geoscientists of Alberta ===
Since 1999, Ladislav Mihaly, who trained as an engineer in Czechoslovakia in the 1970s, has sought accreditation as an engineer in Alberta, but the Association of Professional Engineers and Geoscientists of Alberta (APEGA) said that he did not meet its requirements. He refused to submit to any of the technical examinations but did take a required ethics examination—and failed it, twice. Almost a quarter of Alberta's engineers are immigrants who submitted to the same examinations that Mihaly refused or failed. In 2008, he took his case to the Alberta Human Rights Commission, which ruled in February 2014 that APEGA must pay Mihaly $10,000, provide him with a personal mentor and form a committee to re-evaluate his credentials. APEGA successfully appealed the decision.

=== Lund v Boissoin ===
On July 18, 2002, Dr. Darren Lund, a professor at the University of Calgary, filed a complaint with the Alberta Human Rights Commission against Reverend Stephen Boissoin and the Concerned Christian Coalition.

Boisson had letter published in the Red Deer Advocate that stated, "Where homosexuality flourishes, all manner of wickedness abounds" and "Homosexual rights activists and those that defend them, are just as immoral as the pedophiles, drug dealers and pimps that plague our communities." Lund's complaint alleged that Boisson's letter constituted discrimination on the basis of sexual orientation, as prohibited by Alberta's Human Rights, Citizenship and Multiculturalism Act.

A one-member Alberta Human Rights Panel accepted Lund's arguments that the letter was "likely to expose homosexuals to hatred and/or contempt." The Canadian Civil Liberties Association intervened in the case, condemning the views expressed in the letter but arguing they should not be subject to legal sanction.

On May 30, 2008, the Alberta Human Rights Panel ordered Boissoin and the Concerned Christian Coalition to refrain from publishing future disparaging remarks about homosexuals and provide Lund with a written apology and in $5,000 damages.

On December 3, 2009, the Court of Queen's Bench of Alberta overturned the decision of the Alberta Human Rights Panel. The Court found that the contents of the letter did not violate the Alberta Human Rights Act, and that the remedies that had been imposed were either unlawful or unconstitutional. The Court also identified "troubling aspects of the process leading to the decision of the Panel," including the inclusion of the Concerned Christian Coalition as a respondent. In October 2012, the Court of Appeal of Alberta upheld the decision and agreed with the lower court that Boissoin's letter was "a polemic on a matter of public interest and does not qualify as reaching the extreme limits... to expose persons to hatred or contempt," within the meaning of the Alberta Human Rights Act.

== See also ==
- List of Canadian tribunals

Federal

- Canadian Human Rights Commission
- Canadian Human Rights Tribunal

BC

- British Columbia Human Rights Tribunal
- British Columbia Human Rights Code

Ontario

- Ontario Human Rights Commission
- Human Rights Tribunal of Ontario

Quebec

- Quebec Human Rights Commission
- Human Rights Tribunal of Quebec

Other

- Manitoba Human Rights Commission
- Nova Scotia Human Rights Commission
- Saskatchewan Human Rights Commission
