= Phoenix Trading and Research Corp. =

Defunct Canadian hedge fund

Phoenix Research and Trading Corp.
- Industry: Financial services
- Founded: 1994
- Defunct: 2000
- Headquarters: Toronto, Ontario, Canada
- Key people: Stephen Duthie, Ron Mock

Phoenix Research and Trading Corp. was a Canadian hedge fund firm, based in Toronto, Ontario, that experienced catastrophic trading losses. The firm's fixed income trader, Stephen Duthie, accumulated losses in unhedged U.S. Treasuries that resulted in Phoenix losing approximately 75% of its assets in a month as the positions were unwound. This early Canadian hedge fund blow-up was the result of deceitful trading and incompetent oversight rather than fraud or malfeasance.

== Regulatory action ==
The OSC investigated the sources of the losses and reached settlement agreements with three principals in 2003.

- Stephen Duthie, the trader responsible for the losses, was banned from acting as a portfolio manager, or as a partner or director of a public company for 20 years. The OSC stated that "Duthie's conduct, if not fraudulent, was both unfair and improper". Duthie was also ordered to pay $90,000 towards the costs of the OSC investigation.
- Ronald Mock, the Chief Executive Officer of Phoenix, was banned from registering with the OSC in any capacity for 5 years "for failing to adequately supervise Mr. Duthie".
- Mark Kassirer, founder and Chairman of Phoenix, received a $10,000 fine and his investment firm, Kassirer Asset Management Corp., was subject to an OSC review.
