= Traynor Ridge Capital Inc. =

Defunct Canadian hedge fund

- Industry: Financial services
- Founded: 2020
- Fate: Receivership
- Headquarters: Toronto, Ontario, Canada
- Key people: Christopher Callahan

Traynor Ridge Capital Inc. was a Canadian hedge fund firm, based in Toronto, Ontario, that was placed into receivership in November 2023, shortly after the unexplained death of its 30-year old founder, Christopher Callahan. The firm allegedly had $94 million in assets as of September 30, 2023 but the Ontario Securities Commission ("OSC") stated in early December that the entire amount may have been lost in a series of failed trades executed in October.

Shortly after being notified of Callahan's death, the OSC applied for a cease trade order on the firm. Callahan was the portfolio manager, trader and compliance officer for Traynor Ridge. With his passing, the firm was non-functional and subject to claims for settlements from at least three brokers. Virtu Financial Inc., Echelon Wealth Partners Inc. and JonesTrading Canada all executed trades on behalf of Traynor Ridge but then Traynor Ridge did not settle (i.e., pay for) the trades.
