= Michael Lynk =

Canadian legal academic (born 1952)

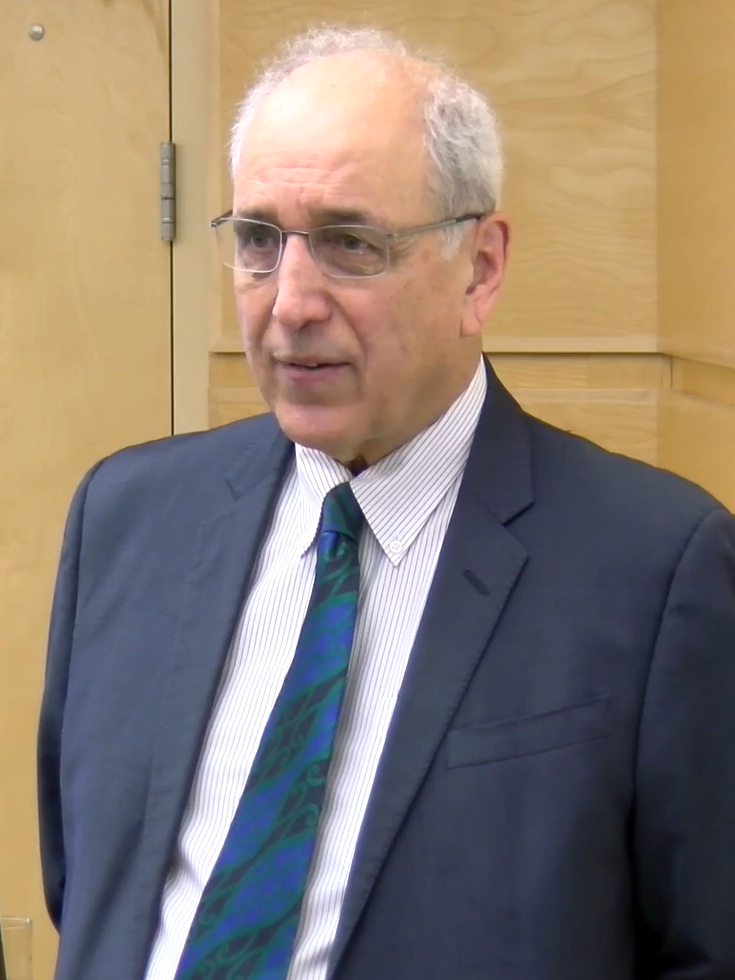
- Lynk in 2025

United Nations Special Rapporteur on the Situation of Human Rights in the Palestinian Territories Occupied since 1967
- In office March, 2016 – May, 2022
- Preceded by: Makarim Wibisono
- Succeeded by: Francesca Albanese

Personal details
- Born: Stanley Michael Lynk; May 2, 1952 (age 74) Halifax, Nova Scotia, Canada
- Spouse: Jill Tansley (m. 2001)
- Children: 2
- Education: Dalhousie University (BA, LL.B); Queen's University (LL.M)
- Occupation: Associate Professor of Law

Stanley Michael Lynk (born 1952) is a Canadian legal academic. He was an associate professor at the University of Western Ontario from 1999 until his retirement in 2022. From 2016 to 2022 he was the Special Rapporteur on the situation of human rights in Palestine.

== Early life and education ==
Michael Lynk was born in Halifax, Nova Scotia to parents: Sarah and Stanley Lynk. His maternal grandparents were Lebanese emigrants to Canada.

Lynk earned a Bachelor of Arts degree from Dalhousie University in 1974, followed by a bachelor of laws from the same university in 1981, before completing a master of law at Queen's University.

== Professional career ==
Lynk is an associate professor of law at the University of Western Ontario. He was initially appointed in 1999, and taught courses in labor, human rights, disability, constitutional and administrative law. He served as associate dean of the faculty between 2008 and 2011. Lynk is a labour arbitrator with the Ontario Grievance Settlement Board, and has served as a vice-chair with the Ontario Public Service Grievance Board. He has written widely on the issues of labour law and human rights in the unionized Canadian workplace, and is a frequent speaker at industrial relations and labour law conferences across the country.

== Work as United Nations Special Rapporteur ==
In March 2016, Lynk was appointed “Special Rapporteur for the human rights situation in the Palestinian Territories occupied since 1967” by the UN Human Rights Council. The position had previously been held by American Richard Falk and South African John Dugard among others. Lynk was succeeded as Special Rapporteur since May 1 2022 by Italian Francesca Albanese. Lynk's appointment was criticized by pro-Israel groups at the time, as well as by Canada's Foreign Minister Stéphane Dion. Supporters of Lynk said such criticism was off-base and “ridiculous”. London, Ontario lawyer Dimitri Lascaris, the Justice Critic for the federal Green party’s shadow cabinet, said Dion's treatment of Lynk was “unconscionable”. Lynk was named to London Mayor Matt Brown’s honour list in January 2015 for humanitarianism.

In July 2021, Lynk wrote that "the creation and expansion of Israeli settlements in the Occupied Palestinian Territory is the State's largest and most ambitious national project since its founding in 1948 (...) the full apparatus of the State – political, military, judicial and administrative – has provided the leadership, financing, planning, diplomatic cover, legal rationale, security protection and infrastructure that has been indispensable to the incessant growth of the enterprise" and that "to incentivize Israeli and diaspora Jews to live in its settlements in the occupied territory, the Government of Israel actively offers a range of financial benefits, including advantageous grants and subsidies for individuals and favourable fiscal arrangements for settlements". Lynk also said that "while the Israeli settlements have flourished and provide an attractive standard of living for the settlers, they have created a humanitarian desert for the Palestinians, reaching every facet of their lives under occupation. Human rights violations against Palestinians arising from the Israeli settlements are widespread and acute and settler violence has created a coercive environment. There is an apartheid-like two-tier legal system granting full citizenship rights for the Israeli settlers while subjecting the Palestinians to military rule".

The report recommended that "the Government of Israel fully comply with its obligations under international law and completely dismantle its civilian settlements in the occupied Palestinian territory", called "upon all United Nations Member States to implement the injunction of the Security Council in resolution 465 (1980) not to provide Israel with any assistance to be used specifically in connexion with settlements in the occupied territories" and said that "the Israeli settlements are the engine of this forever occupation, and amount to a war crime. An occupying power that initiates and expands civilian settlements in defiance of international law and the Rome Statute cannot be serious about peace. Equally, an international community that does not impose accountability measures on a defiant occupying power contrary to international law cannot be serious about its own laws". Same month Lynk told the U.N. Human Rights Council that "I conclude that the Israeli settlements do amount to a war crime,” and calling on countries to inflict a cost on Israel for its illegal occupation. In response, Israel's mission to the UN in Geneva accused the UNHRC of anti-Israel bias.

In March 2022, Lynk submitted a UN Human Rights Council report accusing Israel of apartheid. According to the report, "the Special Rapporteur has concluded that the political system of entrenched rule in the occupied Palestinian territory which endows one racial-national-ethnic group with substantial rights, benefits and privileges while intentionally subjecting another group to live behind walls, checkpoints and under a permanent military rule “sans droits, sans égalité, sans dignité et sans liberté” satisfies the prevailing evidentiary standard for the existence of apartheid (...) It does not have some of the same features as practiced in southern Africa; in particular, much of what has been called ‘petit apartheid’ is not present. On the other hand, there are pitiless features of Israel's ‘apartness’ rule in the occupied Palestinian territory that were not practiced in southern Africa, such as segregated highways, high walls and extensive checkpoints, a barricaded population, missile strikes and tank shelling of a civilian population, and the abandonment of the Palestinians’ social welfare to the international community".

He has frequently called for economic sanctions against Israel to compel the country to end its “illegal occupation” of the West Bank. In his October 2019 report to the General Assembly, Lynk recommended that the international community "take all measures, including countermeasures and sanctions, necessary to ensure the respect by Israel, and all other relevant parties, of their obligations under international law to end the occupation".

== Personal life ==
Lynk is married to Jill Tansley, with whom he has two children, Matthew Lynk and Petra Tansley.
