= Investment Industry Regulatory Organization of Canada =

Canadian self-regulatory organisation (2008–2023)

- Predecessor: Investment Dealers Association of Canada; Market Regulation Services Inc.
- Founded: 17 March 2008
- Defunct: 1 January 2023
- Fate: Merged with the Mutual Fund Dealers Association to form Canadian Investment Regulatory Organization
- Successor: Canadian Investment Regulatory Organization
- Headquarters: Toronto, Ontario
- Website: iiroc.ca

The Investment Industry Regulatory Organization of Canada (IIROC; French: Organisme canadien de réglementation du commerce des valeurs mobilières, or OCRCVM) was a non-profit, national self-regulatory organization (SRO). Established through the merger of the Investment Dealers Association of Canada (IDA) and Market Regulation Services Inc. (RS) on June 1, 2008, IIROC oversaw all investment dealers and trading activity on debt and equity markets in Canada. It was later merged with the Mutual Fund Dealers Association of Canada (MFDA) to form the Canadian Investment Regulatory Organization (CIRO).

The organization set regulatory and investment industry standards. It also had quasi-judicial powers in that it held enforcement hearings and had the power to suspend, fine and expel members and registered representatives, such as advisors. However, it has often been criticized by investor advocates as ineffective.

== History ==
IIROC was formed on June 1, 2008, through the merger of the Investment Dealers Association of Canada (IDA) and Market Regulation Services Inc. (RS).

The Bond Dealers Section of the Toronto Board of Trade was formed in 1916 as a trade organization to coordinate financing of Canada's war effort. It was renamed the Investment Dealers Association of Canada in 1934. Throughout most of its history, the IDA serve both as a regulator and as an advocacy organization for the securities dealers. In 2006, IDA narrowed its focus to regulation and transferred its industry association role to a new separate and independent industry association, the Investment Industry Association of Canada.

Market Regulation Services Inc. was formed in 2002 in response to the implementation of National Instruments 21-101 Marketplace Operation and 23-101 Trading Rules, which require an independent regulation services provider to regulate trading in all Canadian marketplaces, including the TSX.

In January 2023, IIROC merged with the MFDA to form the CIRO, a new single regulator for all investment firms and advisors in Canada.

== Operations ==
IIROC operated under Recognition Orders from the Canadian Securities Administrators (CSA), which is the umbrella for Canada's provincial and territorial securities regulators. IIROC was subject to CSA oversight and regular operational reviews.

=== Regulatory failures ===
==== Loss of unencrypted private investor data ====
The CSA (Canadian Securities Administrators) investigated IIROC for the loss of personal financial data of thousands of brokerage clients after IIROC announced that it lost a mobile device containing the information. The device had not been encrypted, which is in violation of IIROC policy. The case reviewed IIROC's current policies, controls and procedures around information security.

More than 50,000 Canadian brokerage clients, from 32 investment firms, had personal financial information on the device. At least one source has called the incident a cover up.

==== Charges against David Berry ====
IIROC charged David Berry with securities law violations that were used by Scotiabank as grounds for his dismissal. David Berry claims his dismissal and the reputation damage stemming from the IIROC charges have cost him $105M dollars.

In a ruling on January 15, 2013, more than seven years after the initial accusation, a hearing panel of the IIROC dismissed all charges against Berry.

==== Charges against Blackmont Capital Inc. and Dean Shannon Duke ====
In September 2010, IIROC contended that a Vancouver brokerage firm, Blackmont Capital Inc., and an employee, Dean Shannon Duke, acted against two IIROC rules in agreeing to share trading commissions with a third party. In December 2010, IIROC imposed penalties on both Blackmont Capital and Duke for splitting commissions with people associated with a client without the client's written consent. IIROC also imposed penalties for not disclosing the commission-sharing arrangement with its clients. Blackmont Capital and Duke were assessed a total of $857,500 in fines by IIROC.

In 2011, the British Columbia Securities Commission (BCSC) overturned IIROC's decision and penalties against Blackmont Capital and Duke. A BCSC appeal panel contended that Blackmont and Duke's act of not disclosing their commission-sharing arrangement was not against public interest. The BCSC reversed IIROC's verdict and the imposing of its fines.

==== Charges against Evergreen Securities CCO ====
An Oct. 2012 IIROC Hearing Panel dismissed all allegations made by IIROC against Evergreen Capital Partners Inc. executives Loretta Carbonelli and Gerald T.Conway.

==== Charges against Vic Alboini and Northern Securities Inc. ====
In 2012, IIROC contended that activist investor, Vic Alboini, and two other executives at Northern Securities Inc. had improperly obtained credit for Jaguar Financial Corporation and had risked Northern Securities as a result. IIROC penalized Alboini with a suspension of two years, a permanent ban from being an "ultimate designated person" and fines totaling $750,000.

Northern Securities appealed IIROC's decision to the Ontario Securities Commission (OSC). The OSC overturned one count against Alboini and Northern Securities, namely that Alboini and Northern Securities had not corrected deficiencies found in IIROC compliance reviews. The OSC also overturned IIROC's penalties against Alboini and Northern Securities, saying that IIROC should not have announced serious penalties at the same time as their decision.

==== Charges against Carolann Steinhoff ====
IIROC imposed charges against broker, Carolann Steinhoff. Focusing on Steinhoff's activities between 2004 and 2007, IIROC contended that Steinhoff had instructed her assistants to falsify client documents and that she had obstructed IIROC investigations. Part of IIROC's contentions related to Steinhoff's instruction to her assistant to cut and paste a client's signature from an existing form to an unsigned guarantee.

In 2011, the BCSC overturned IIROC's decision against Steinhoff. In overturning IRROC's decision, the BCSC stated that IIROC's ruling against Steinhoff was not supported by the objective evidence, but was made on the basis of character evidence. The BCSC panel also concluded that Steinhoff was entitled to defend herself and therefore overturned the charges against her for obstructing IIROC's investigation.

==== Jurisdiction over former members dispute ====
The organization has been involved in litigation over its power to discipline former members for their conduct while they were members. An Ontario Divisional Court decision in the matter of Stephen Taub ruled the Ontario Securities Act does not allow this. The British Columbia Court of Appeal reached a different conclusion in the matter of Charles Dass and upheld a decision of the British Columbia Securities Commission that IIROC does have jurisdiction over former members. Later the Ontario Court of Appeal reversed the Ontario Divisional Court decision and reached the same conclusion as the British Columbia Court. In Saskatchewan and Alberta, provincial securities regulations state explicitly that self-regulatory organizations have the power to pursue enforcement activities with regards to former members.

== See also ==
- Canadian Investment Regulatory Organization
- Canadian securities regulation
- Universal Market Integrity Rules
