= Alberta Securities Commission =

Canadian securities regulatory body

Agency overview
- Formed: 1955; 71 years ago
- Jurisdiction: Government of Alberta
- Headquarters: Calgary
- Agency executive: Stan Magidson, Chair and Chief Executive Officer
- Website: asc.ca

The Alberta Securities Commission (ASC) is the securities commission responsible for administering and enforcing securities legislation in the Canadian province of Alberta.

The Alberta Securities Act RSA 2000, a revision of the original Act that came into effect on January 1, 2002, is the statute that establishes Alberta's securities laws and gives the Alberta Securities Commission its powers and duties.

The ASC also oversees the ICE NGX Canada Inc., the Investment Industry Regulatory Organization of Canada, and the Mutual Fund Dealers Association of Canada. Along with British Columbia, the ASC jointly oversees the operations of the TSX Venture Exchange.

The organization of the ASC is divided into Members and Staff, which includes the Executive Management. Members set policy and recommend changes to the Securities Act and the Securities Regulation, and members act as the commission's Board of Directors. The Staff has responsibility for registering persons and companies, reviewing prospectuses, considering exemption applications and taking enforcement action.

The ASC staff has also created seven advisory committees to act as sounding boards for developing new or amended securities regulation: Exempt Market Dealer Advisory Committee, Derivatives Advisory Committee, Financial Advisory Committee, Market Advisory Committee, Petroleum Advisory Committee, Securities Advisory Committee, and New Economy Advisory Committee.

== See also ==
- Autorité des marchés financiers (Québec)
- British Columbia Securities Commission
- Canadian Securities Administrators
- Canadian securities regulation
- List of financial supervisory authorities by country
- Ontario Securities Commission
- Securities Commission
