= Independent Review Committee =

An Independent Review Committee (IRC) is a special committee that is required to be part of the governance structure of every investment fund that is offered to the public in Canada. IRCs are currently unique to the investment fund business in Canada, as other countries have dealt with the inherent conflict of interest involved in running public investment funds in different ways. For example, in the United States of America, mutual funds have been required to have independent directors ever since 1935.

In Canada, a securities regulation called National Instrument 81-107 Independent Review Committees for Investment Funds (the Instrument) requires every public investment fund to have a fully independent body, called an Independent Review Committee, whose role is to oversee all decisions involving an actual or perceived conflict of interest faced by the fund manager in the operation of the fund. The Instrument sets out an independent oversight regime for all publicly offered investment funds that is intended to improve investment fund governance in Canada.

== History ==
In 1999, a debate over the need for independent boards for mutual funds and increased regulatory standards for fund managers caused the Canadian Securities Administrators to suggest Stephen Erlichman make specific improvement recommendations. His report, entitled "Making it Mutual: Aligning the Interests of Investors and Managers: Recommendations for a Mutual Fund Governance Regime in Canada", was released in June 2000.

On March 1, 2002, the CSA released Concept Proposal 81-402 ("Striking a New Balance: A Framework for Regulating Mutual Funds and their Managers"), a framework for regulating mutual funds and fund managers based on five pillars: registration of mutual fund managers (now NI 31-103), mutual fund governance, product regulation, disclosure and investor rights and regulatory presence. After public consultation, the CSA published the Instrument in final form on July 28, 2006 and it came into force in 2007. The manager must abide by the decision of the IRC on those matters that require its approval (subject to a manager's overriding right to seek "exemptive relief" from its regulator). A manager must consider the recommendation of the IRC in respect of other conflict of interest matters, but may disregard the recommendation of the IRC after such consideration.

In March 2007, the CSA published an FAQ on the Instrument entitled "CSA Staff Notice FAQs on 81-107: NI - 81-107 - Independent Review Committee for Investment Funds".
