= Health Professions Appeal and Review Board =

The Health Professions Appeal and Review Board (HPARB) is an independent adjudicative agency which reviews decisions made by the 28 self-regulating health professions in Ontario. The Board also holds hearings concerning physicians' hospital privileges under the Public Hospitals Act.

== Board ==
The Health Professions Appeal and Review Board was created in 1998 under the Ministry of Health Appeal and Review Boards Act, 1998. The Board was an amalgamation of the Health Professions Board and the Hospital Appeal Board. It is made up of at least 12 members, each appointed by the Lieutenant Governor of Ontario on the advice of a Minister of the Government of Ontario. Proceedings before the board are before either one or three members.

The board was the winner of the 2008 Nonprofit Public Governance award granted by DiverseCity onBoard. The award was based upon the diverse nature and activities of the board.

== Notable decisions ==
In 2015, the Board dismissed a protest for a caution issued to a weight-loss doctor who had broken advertising rules. The Board twice overruled decisions by the College of Physicians and Surgeons of Ontario dismissing a sexual assault complaint against a neurologist.
