= Meritech Capital Partners =

American Late-Stage Venture Firm

- Type: Private
- Industry: Late-Stage Venture Firm
- Founded: 1999
- Founders: Mike Gordon, Paul Madera, Rob Ward
- Headquarters: Palo Alto, CA, United States
- Key people: Craig Sherman (Managing Director)
- Products: Venture capital
- Total assets: $2.6 billion
- Number of employees: 20+
- Website: www.meritechcapital.com

Meritech Capital Partners is an American venture capital firm focused on late-stage investments in information technology companies with a focus on consumer Internet and media, software and services, enterprise infrastructure, and medical devices. Investments has included the popular online game Roblox, Datadog and Salesforce.

== History ==
The Palo Alto, California-based firm, was founded in 1999 with sponsorship from Accel Partners, Oak Investment Partners, Redpoint Ventures and Worldview Technology Partners. Since 2003, however, Meritech has independently operated and invested in later-stage technology companies. The firm has raised approximately $2.6 billion since inception across four funds. In July 2014 Meritech raised a $500 million fund with a $65 million sidecar vehicle.
