= Fabricators & Manufacturers Association, International =

Professional association for metal workers

Fabricators and Manufacturers Association, Int'l (FMA)
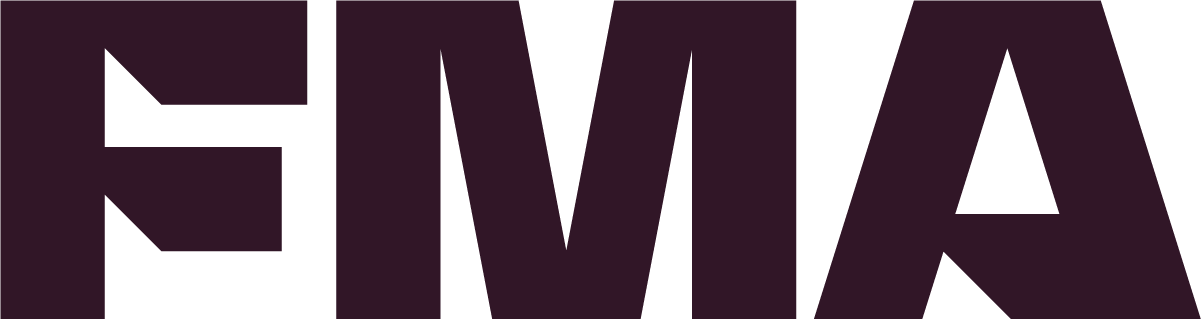
- Abbreviation: FMA
- Predecessor: Fabricating Machinery Association, Inc
- Formation: September 1970
- Type: Professional association
- Headquarters: Elgin, Illinois, United States
- Location: 2135 Point Boulevard, Elgin, IL 60123
- Region served: Worldwide
- Official language: English
- President and CEO: Ed Youdell
- Chairman of the Board of Directors: Jason Hillenbrand
- Subsidiaries: SparkForce Foundation, FMA Communications, FMA Communications Canada
- Affiliations: Tube & Pipe Association, International (TPA), Association of Metals Processors and Distributors (AMPD), Fabrication & Welding Education Technology Council, Fabrication Technology Council, Safety Technology Council, Roll Forming Technology Council, Management Advisory Council, Coil Processing Technology Council
- Website: fmamfg.org

Fabricators and Manufacturers Association, International (FMA) is a nonprofit professional association serving both company and individual members in the metal processing, forming, and fabricating industries. Registered in the United States as a 501(c)(3) organization, it also has members in Canada and Mexico.

== History ==
FMA was founded in 1970, in Rockford, Illinois, as the Fabricating Machinery Association, Inc. The 501(c)6 organization was supported by machinery builders with a common goal of providing non-partisan technical information on metal fabricating. It was incorporated on October 30, 1970. In the early days of the association, memberships were classified as Regular Members (machinery builders), Associate Members (metal fabricators), Affiliate Members (distributors), and Honorary Members. Later, in 1971, a new classification was created to include OEM suppliers and prime manufacturers of fabricating machinery - these were Allied Members.

In 1971 the first issue of the FMA's bi-monthly flagship publication, The Fabricator, was published on newsprint. In 1979, the first issue of The Fabricator with a glossy magazine cover was published, and three years later the trade magazine expanded to 8 glossy issues.

On June 26, 1975, FMA changed its name to the Fabricating Manufacturers Association, Inc. and changed all membership classifications to Company Member. Dues were set at $200 per year, regardless of size. The association finally changed to its current moniker, Fabricators & Manufacturers Association, International, in August 1985. Membership has grown to more than 2,500 individual and company members in the United States, Canada, and Mexico. The association moved its headquarters from Rockford to Elgin, Illinois, in December 2016.

== Charitable foundation ==
The nonprofit foundation of FMA, SparkForce (formerly Nuts, Bolts & Thingamajigs), awards scholarships for qualified students in post-secondary educational programs leading to careers in manufacturing and provides grants to community and technical colleges to produce manufacturing summer camps for youths ages 12–16. Fundraising events, online donation campaigns, and the annual Presidents Challenge initiative provide the funding for these awards and grants.

NBT was originally founded by actor John Ratzenberger and joined with the FMA Foundation in 2009 to become Nuts, Bolts & Thinagamajigs, the Foundation of the Fabricators & Manufacturers Association, International. In 2025, NBT officially became SparkForce.

== Initiatives and sponsorships ==
FMA president and CEO Ed Youdell came up with the idea of a national Manufacturing Day to draw public attention to the available career opportunities in manufacturing. By educating students and parents alike, the Manufacturing Day (MFG DAY) initiative provides opportunities to bring communities together and highlight the technologies in today's advanced manufacturing facilities. The first Manufacturing Day effort was celebrated in 2012 by more than 150 companies across the nation. It was co-produced by FMA, The U.S. Commerce Department's Hollings Manufacturing Extension Partnership (MEP), the National Association of Manufacturers (NAM), and the Manufacturing Institute. Across North America, the number of annual MFGDAY events has grown substantially - more than 2,000 registered hosts were announced for 2015. The National Association of Manufacturers took over producing Manufacturing Day efforts after the 2016 event.

FMA is a co-sponsor of FABTECH, a trade show serving the metal forming, fabricating, welding, and finishing industries. On odd-numbered years, FABTECH is held in Chicago, IL; the 2015 show was the 19th largest trade show of any kind in the United States (ranked by net square feet). FABTECH is held annually in collaboration with SME (previously the Society of Manufacturing Engineers), the American Welding Society (AWS), the Precision Metalforming Association (PMA), and the Chemical Coaters Association, International] (CCAI).

== Technology councils ==
Because association membership has grown to serve members involved in many diverse processes within the industry, there are thirteen different technology councils with missions targeted specifically for those processes or issues of industry-wide concern. Participation on these councils is voluntary, and offers FMA members the opportunity to develop leadership skills and exchange ideas on technical and management topics affecting metal processors and fabricators worldwide.

- Certified Education Center Council
- Coil Processing Technology Council
- Extrusion, Drawing, and Tube Reducing Technology Council
- Industrial Laser Technology Council
- Management Advisory Council
- Roll Forming Technology Council
- Safety Technology Council
- Sheet & Plate Technology Council
- Metals Processing Council
- Tube & Pipe Fabricating Technology Council
- Tube & Pipe Producing Technology Council
- Mexico Advisory Council
- Software Technology Council

== Publications ==
FMA Communications, Inc. (FMAC) operates as a subsidiary of FMA and a publishing company that serves the metal forming and fabricating industry. FMAC produces authoritative trade magazines for skilled workers in their respective industries. Editorials, columns, industry news, and advancements in manufacturing technology are all covered by FMAC staff and industry professionals. The official publications of FMAC include The FABRICATOR, The Tube & Pipe Journal, STAMPING Journal, Practical Welding Today, The Fabricator en Espanol, Canadian Metalworking, and Canadian Fabricating & Welding.
