= Canadian securities regulation =

Overview of securities law in Canada

Canadian securities regulation is managed through the laws and agencies established by Canada's 10 provincial and 3 territorial governments. Each province and territory has a securities commission or equivalent authority with its own provincial or territorial legislation.

Unlike other major federations, Canada has no securities regulatory authority at the federal government level. Nonetheless, most provincial security commissions operate under a passport system, so that approval of one commission essentially allows for registration in another province. However, concerns about the system remain. For example, Ontario (Canada's largest capital market) does not participate in the passport regimen.

Securities regulators from each province and territory have joined to form the Canadian Securities Administrators (CSA).

Concerns about the provincial system of securities regulation have led to repeated calls for a national securities system in Canada. As of June 2021, the Canadian government is working towards establishing a national securities regulatory system to provide:

- better and more consistent protection for investors across Canada;
- improved regulatory and criminal enforcement to better fight security-related crime;
- new tools to better support the stability of the Canadian financial system;
- faster policy responses to emerging market trends;
- simpler processes for businesses, resulting in lower costs for investors;
- more effective international representation and influence for Canada.

== List of securities regulators in Canada ==
Each provincial securities regulator is either a self-funded commission or an entity funded within a larger government department. Regulators (and their respective parent departments, if any) for each province include:

- Alberta Securities Commission;
- British Columbia Securities Commission;
- Manitoba Securities Commission – under the Manitoba Financial Services Agency; the Chair reports to the legislature through the Minister of Finance;
- Financial and Consumer Services Commission (New Brunswick) – arm's length, self-funded, independent Crown Corporation established by the provincial government on 1 July 2013;
- Financial Services Regulation Division, Digital Government and Service NL (Newfoundland and Labrador);
- Office of the Superintendent of Securities (Northwest Territories) – under the Legal Registries division, Department of Justice;
- Nova Scotia Securities Commission;
- Nunavut Securities Office – under the Department of Justice;
- Ontario Securities Commission (OSC) – the largest of the provincial regulators;
- PEI Office of the Superintendent of Securities Office (Prince Edward Island) – under the Department of Justice and Public Safety/Office of the Attorney General;
- Autorité des marchés financiers (Quebec);
- Financial and Consumer Affairs Authority of Saskatchewan;
- Office of the Yukon Superintendent of Securities.

== Canadian securities regulatory system ==
Canada has no securities regulatory authority at the federal government level. Instead, each province and territory has a securities commission or equivalent authority and legislation. Provincial governments established regulatory agencies beginning with Manitoba in 1912; two decades later, the Privy Council of Canada decided in Lymburn v Mayland [1932] AC 318, that such legislation is authorized under the provincial property and civil rights power.

Each provincial securities regulator is either a self-funded commission or an entity funded within a larger government department, typically under the respective Justice department. The securities regulator administers the province's securities legislation and, correspondingly, promulgates its own set of rules and regulations. The regulator relies on the work of the national self-regulatory organization—the Canadian Investment Regulatory Organization (CIRO)—for most aspects of the regulation of the organization's member firms and their employees. Accountability for securities regulation extends from the securities regulator to the Minister responsible for securities regulation and, ultimately, the legislature in each province.

The largest of the provincial regulators is the Ontario Securities Commission (OSC). Other significant local regulators are the Alberta Securities Commission, British Columbia Securities Commission, and the Autorité des marchés financiers (Québec).

Public education on financial literacy, investment, and financial decision-making is a secondary focus of the provincial regulators. The OSC created the non-profit organization Investor Education Fund (IEF) for this sole purpose. Funded by the OSC but acting independently, IEF's primary goal is to provide Canadians with financial tools and information to improve financial literacy.

=== Canadian Securities Administrators ===
The provincial and territorial regulators work together to coordinate and harmonize regulations, policies, and practices regarding Canadian capital markets through the Canadian Securities Administrators (CSA), an umbrella regulatory organization that serves Canadian markets, securities issuers, and investors. The major provincial securities regulators also participate in various international co-operative organizations and arrangements.

The CSA has focused its efforts on:

- Developing uniform rules and guidelines for securities market participants.
- Coordinating approval processes.
- Developing national electronic systems through which regulatory filings can be made with and processed by all jurisdictions.
- Coordinating compliance and enforcement activities.

The most critical CSA effort is implementing the "'Passport'" regulatory system. Under Passport, a market participant can obtain a decision from its principal regulator and, through a simple filing, have the same decision deemed to be issued under the legislation of all other participating jurisdictions, in essence providing a passport to undertake capital markets activity across Canada. The Passport system covers prospectus filings, registration of securities firms and individuals, and certain types of discretionary exemptions. Ontario is recognized by the other jurisdictions as a principal jurisdiction for Passport decisions, but the Ontario Securities Commission (OSC) has not adopted the passport rule itself. As a result, Ontario market participants have access to other jurisdictions through the Passport system, but participants from other jurisdictions do not have access to Ontario. Instead, the OSC follows a "mutual reliance" policy in which it decides in each case whether to accept the decision of the principal regulator. Ontario has stated support for harmonization and improved coordination of securities regulation in Canada; however, it does not wish to participate in the passport system because it would prefer creating a national securities regulator.

== Concerns ==
On 21 February 2008, the Government of Canada appointed an Expert Panel on Securities Regulation to provide advice and recommendations on securities regulation in Canada. On 12 January 2009, the Panel released its final report, in which they highlighted several concerns with the current structure, along with a draft "Securities Act" to the federal Minister of Finance and the provincial and territorial ministers responsible for securities regulation.

The Panel was concerned that the fragmented structure, requiring decisions to be coordinated across up to 13 jurisdictions, made it difficult for Canadian securities regulators to react quickly and decisively to capital market events. One example of this difficulty was the adoption in September 2008 by some of Canada's international counterparts, including the United States and the United Kingdom, of restrictions of short-selling specific stock as a temporary stability measure. The Canadian response lagged behind the coordinated efforts of the US and the UK and was not uniform across the provinces. A second example was the delay between the freezing of the non-bank asset-backed commercial paper (ABCP) market in August 2007 and the release of a consultation paper by the CSA. The paper was for input on several proposals to prevent similar capital market failures in the future. The Panel found that the extant regulatory structure is prone to slow responses, making Canada vulnerable to market risks and impacting its reputation.

The Panel also expressed concern that the Canadian system of provincial mandates is not in agreement with the national response required to address developments in capital markets that are increasingly national and international in scope. They found that one of the crucial lessons from the capital markets crisis throughout 2008–2009 (the Great Recession) is that systemic risk is increasingly presenting itself in capital markets rather than confining itself to banking institutions. The Panel reported that effectively addressing systemic risk requires the joint effort of all financial sector regulators within Canada and effective coordination with international counterparts. The Panel did not believe that the multiple provincial and territorial securities regulators could work effectively as part of a national systemic risk management team, as structural challenges will likely compromise its ability to efficiently address larger capital market issues in a timely manner. A delayed response, having been poorly managed by any of the securities regulators, may have a negative impact on the integrity of Canada's capital markets as a whole.

Additionally, the Panel reported that the current structure poorly allocates resources, causing securities regulation to be less effective. Resources are used in keeping 13 separate securities regulators operating in Canada. This is inefficient as each jurisdiction dedicates a different level of resources to securities regulation, which causes the intensity of policy development, supervision, and enforcement activities to vary across the country. Most efforts are duplicated, which results in unnecessary costs, overstaffing, and delays. Canadians, in turn, are afforded different levels of investor protection depending on the jurisdiction in which they reside or invest. At the same time, market participants will continue to be burdened with unnecessary compliance costs, even with the full implementation of the passport system. Market participants have to pay fees in up to 13 jurisdictions, deal with the general inefficiencies associated with differences between provincial statutes and regulations, the ongoing use of local rules, and variable interpretations of national rules.

== Canadian Securities Transition Office ==
The Canadian Securities Transition Office (French: Bureau de transition canadien en valeurs mobilières) is a federal organization that was created to assist in the establishment of a Canadian securities regulation regime and a Canadian regulatory authority. Its mandate is to help develop capital-markets regulatory capabilities falling within the jurisdiction of the Government of Canada.

Its mandate includes helping to prepare for the successful administration of the proposed federal "Capital Markets Stability Act"; providing support for the establishment of the Cooperative Capital Markets Regulatory System; and giving advice to the Canadian Department of Finance's Financial Sector Policy Branch.

The Transition Office is tasked with leading all aspects of the transition towards a federal Canadian securities regulator, including developing the proposed federal "Securities Act" and the accompanying regulations, collaborating with provinces and territories, and developing and implementing a transition plan for organizational and administrative matters.

=== History ===
==== Background ====
Over the past 45 years, the majority of studies by independent expert and academic analysts have come out in favor of establishing a Canadian securities regulator, beginning with the Porter Report in 1964 and the Kimber Report in 1965. In the most recent decade, the push for a national regulator has been particularly strong, with reports delivered from the Wise Persons Committee, the Crawford Panel, and the Expert Panel on Securities Regulation.

In their final report in January 2009, the Expert Panel made a series of recommendations, the most important being establishing a Canadian securities regulator to administer a single "Securities Act" for all of Canada. The Expert Panel provided a recommended transition path to bring this about, with one key step being creating a transition and planning team to oversee the transition to a federal regulatory system.

On 22 June 2009, the Government of Canada acted on this recommendation and announced the launch of the Canadian Securities Transition Office to lead Canada's effort to establish a Canadian securities regulator.

==== Development ====
The Canadian Securities Transition Office was implemented in July 2009 by the Government of Canada through the "Canadian Securities Regulation Regime Transition Office Act".

Doug Hyndman was made the Chair and Chief Executive Officer of the Transition Office, and Bryan Davies the Vice-Chair. Hyndman had been Chair of the British Columbia Securities Commission since 1987; Davies had been Chair of the Canada Deposit Insurance Corporation since 2006, and previously the Chief Executive Officer and Superintendent of the Financial Services Commission of Ontario.

All Canadian jurisdictions have been invited and encouraged to join in the Government of Canada's effort, which will build on the existing infrastructure and expertise of the provincial and territorial securities regulators. On 15 October 2009, the federal government announced the appointment of an Advisory Committee of ten Participating Provinces and Territories to the Transition Office with representatives from Newfoundland and Labrador, Prince Edward Island, Nova Scotia, New Brunswick, Ontario, Saskatchewan, British Columbia, Yukon, Northwest Territories, and Nunavut. The Advisory Committee provided advice to the Transition Office on the transition to a Canadian securities regulator to ensure that each of the participating governments' interests is represented in the work of establishing a Canadian securities regulator.

In its first year, the Transition Office and the Government of Canada completed two critical steps in transitioning to a Canadian securities regulator:

- On 26 May 2010, the federal government tabled for information in the House of Commons the proposed "Canadian" "Securities Act". The proposed Act was built on provincial securities regulation and harmonized existing legislation in the form of a single statute. It benefits from the work of the Expert Panel on Securities Regulation and other reform efforts and reflects domestic and international best practices. It proposed significant improvements in terms of governance, adjudication, financial stability, regulatory and criminal enforcement, and provision for a wide scope of authority to regulate financial instruments and participants in capital markets.
- On 12 July 2010, the Transition Office delivered its Transition Plan for the Canadian Securities Regulatory Authority to the Minister of Finance and the ministers responsible for securities regulation of the participating provinces and territories.

Concurrent with releasing the proposed "Canadian" "Securities Act", the federal government referred the proposed Act to the Supreme Court of Canada for its opinion on the following question: "Is the annexed proposed "Canadian" "Securities Act" within the legislative authority of the Parliament of Canada?" The Supreme Court heard the reference on 13 and 14 April 2011. On 22 December that year, the Supreme Court returned its decision, finding the proposed Canadian Securities Act to be beyond the constitutional authority of Parliament under the general trade and commerce power. More specifically, the proposed Act as drafted would not be valid under the general branch of the federal trade and commerce power under section 91(2) of the constitution. However, the court indicated that some aspects of the Act could be valid under that power. It also noted that it had not been asked for its opinion on the extent of Parliament's legislative authority under other heads of federal power, including the interprovincial and international trade branch of section 91(2). The court concluded that a cooperative legislative approach through which the federal and provincial governments exercise their powers collaboratively would be possible.

Following the Supreme Court of Canada's decision, the Government of Canada announced that it was exploring with provinces the possibility of working jointly to establish a standard securities regulator.

In 2013, the Government of Canada signed an agreement in principle with British Columbia and Ontario governments to establish a federal-provincial Cooperative Capital Markets Regulatory System. Since then, five other provinces and one territory have joined the Cooperative System.

To support the establishment of the Cooperative System, participating governments created the Capital Markets Authority Implementation Organization in 2015 to lead the work to integrate the participating regulatory organizations into the Capital Markets Regulatory Authority. Also, in 2015, the Transition Office began work to prepare for the successful administration of the proposed federal "Capital Markets Stability Act," complementary federal legislation to the "Canadian Securities Act."

In 2018, the Supreme Court of Canada found the proposed federal "Capital Markets Stability Act" within federal jurisdiction. It implemented a pan-Canadian securities regulator as contemplated within the Cooperative Capital Markets Regulatory System to permit the constitution.

=== Cooperative System ===
The Cooperative Capital Markets Regulatory System is a federal–provincial system being designed to streamline Canada's capital markets regulatory framework to protect investors, foster efficient capital markets, and manage systemic risk while preserving strengths of the current system.

Jointly engaged in the implementation of this system are the federal Government of Canada and the governments of British Columbia, Ontario, Saskatchewan, New Brunswick, Newfoundland and Labrador, Nova Scotia, Prince Edward Island, and Yukon, under an interim body called the Capital Markets Authority Implementation Organization (CMAIO; French: Organisme de mise en place de l’Autorité des marchés des capitaux, OMAMC).

The CMA'IOs purpose is to assist in transitioning to and implementing a single, operationally-independent"' Capital Markets Regulatory Authority'" ("'CMRA'") contemplated for the Cooperative System. Once created, the CMRA will be the single regulator administering the proposed uniform provincial-territorial "Capital Markets Act," a single set of regulations, and complementary federal "Capital Markets Stability Act." These acts and the regulations would form the legislative cornerstones of the new Cooperative Capital Markets Regulatory System when passed.

The Transition Office provides office space and administrative, technical, and financial support to the CMAIO.

In 2021, the development of legislation to create the Cooperative System was put on hold as the participating governments needed to rework their plans in response to the COVID-19 pandemic. CMAIO operations were paused, effective 31 March 2021.

==== CMAIO leadership ====
The CMAIO Board of Directors is accountable to the Council of Ministers, composed of the federal Minister of Finance and the provincial and territorial Ministers responsible for capital-markets regulation in each participating jurisdiction.

The Council consists of:

- Selina Robinson, Minister of Finance (British Columbia)
- Peter Bethlenfalvy, Minister of Finance and President of the Treasury Board (Ontario)
- Gordon Wyant, Minister of Justice and Attorney General (Saskatchewan)
- Ernie Steeves, Minister of Finance (New Brunswick)
- Sarah Stoodley, Minister of Digital Government and Service NL (Newfoundland and Labrador)
- Karen Casey, Minister of Finance (Nova Scotia)
- Darlene Compton, Minister of Finance (Prince Edward Island)
- John Streicker, Minister of Community Services (Yukon)
- Chrystia Freeland, Deputy Prime Minister and Minister of Finance (Canada)

In July 2016, the Council of Ministers appointed an initial Board of Directors for CMAIO, composed of industry experts broadly representative of the regions of Canada. On 31 March 2021, CMAIO paused operations, and the following Directors remain on the Board:

- Jill Leversage, Chair
- Andrea Bolger
- Harold H. MacKay

== See also ==
- Canadian Securities Administrators
- Financial regulation
- Financial regulatory authorities of Canada
- Independent Review Committee
- Securities commission
