= Universal Market Integrity Rules =

Universal Market Integrity Rules (UMIR) are the set of rules governing financial market integrity in Canada that are defined by the Canadian Investment Regulatory Organization (CIRO).
