= Financial management advisor =

The financial management advisor (FMA) is a professional designation of the Canadian Securities Institute (CSI), the official educator of the Canadian securities industry. The FMA is a personal financial planning designation which is usually a precursor to the certified financial planner (CFP) designation. There are over three thousand FMA holders in Canada. The FMA designation is not recognized in the province of Quebec.

The FMA is awarded by the CSI automatically upon the completion of the required coursework with an average of 60% or better consisting of three courses and six exams ranging in length from two to three hours: the Canadian Securities Course (CSC), the Professional Financial Planning Course (PFPC), and the Wealth Management Techniques Course (WMTC). Unlike the CFP, there is no vocational experience requirement to qualify for the FMA. However, the second exam of the PFPC and the WMTC tests the student in applied comprehension of the theoretical material. The FMA designation is public information and the CSI will confirm whether any particular person claiming the FMA has actually qualified for the designation. It can also be revoked by the CSI for misconduct.

These courses are offered by independent study, primarily through the print medium. In addition, optional online tutorials are available to assist the student in working through the material, consisting of educational exercises and quizzes similar to the multiple-choice format of the actual exams. Students may also submit questions concerning the course content directly via email to the CSI. Many community and vocational colleges also offer exam preparation courses for registered CSI students, which enable them to experience the benefits of classroom learning in addition to the distance education format. The exams themselves are proctored by the CSI.

Successful completion of the PFPC entitles the graduate to write the CFP exam. Dalhousie University accepts these and other courses offered by the CSI as credits towards qualifying to receive its MBA degree in financial management, provided the student maintain an average grade of 70% or better. Thus, these courses may be regarded as postgraduate equivalent credits in financial management.

Completion of the CSI's FMA program does not constitute registration with the securities commission of the province in which the FMA holder resides, and does not qualify the FMA holder to provide recommendations or advice with respect to the buying or selling of specific securities. Although the Ontario Securities Act requires financial advisors to be registered, the Ontario Securities Commission (OSC) has not yet implemented a registration protocol for financial advisors in Ontario; thus, currently registration as a financial advisor in Ontario is not mandated.

Financial management advisors, like personal financial planners, wealth managers, are not registered to provide investment advice but provide general financial counselling and advice to clients on a fee, percentage of assets, or commission basis or some hybrid of these. A typical fee for a fee-only planner might range from CDN$80 to CDN$180 per hour. The body of knowledge underlying personal financial planning is becoming increasingly well codified. A typical program might include a best practices approach, establishing the engagement, data gathering, clarifying financial status, financial management, risk management, tax planning, education planning, retirement planning, estate planning, asset management, planning for the closely held business, developing and presenting the financial plan, implementation and monitoring, modular planning and special planning goals, and regulatory, ethical, and legal issues, as well as marketing and practice management.

== Canadian Securities Course ==
The Canadian Securities Course is the universal prerequisite for enrolling in any other CSI course or program. It consists of two volumes of instructional material plus a workbook. The following is a synopsis of the course content of the CSC:

- The Capital Markets and Financial Services
- The Canadian Economy
- Financing, Listing and Regulation
- Corporations and Their Financial Statements
- Fixed-Income Securities
- Equities
- Managed Products
- Segregated Funds
- Derivative Securities
- Analyzing Markets and Products
- Financial Planning and Taxation
- The Portfolio Approach
- Building the Relationship with the Client

== Professional Financial Planning Course ==
The Professional Financial Planning Course is the first course in the CSI's FMA program, consisting of two volumes of instructional material. The following is a synopsis of the course content of the PFPC:

- Financial Planning Practice
- Budget and Savings Planning
- Residential Mortgages
- Business Law
- Family Law
- Insurance
- Tax Planning
- Retirement Planning
- Estate Planning
- Investment Management
- Financial Planning Case
- Financial Math

PFPC graduates are qualified by the CSI to provide personal financial planning services to persons whose net worth is less than $300,000.

== Wealth Management Techniques ==
The WMTC is the final course in the CSI's FMA program, consisting of one volume of instructional material. The following is a synopsis of the course content of the WMTC:

- The Wealth Management Process
- Understanding the Client
- Communication and Education
- Ethical Issues
- Retirement Planning
- Insurance Planning
- Tax Planning
- Estate Planning
- Risk and Return
- Asset Allocation
- Basic Managed Products
- Managed Products for the High-Net-Worth Client
- Performance Appraisal
- Formalizing and Implementing the Investment Plan
- Market Research and Business Planning
- Marketing Your Wealth Management Business

WMTC graduates are qualified by the CSI to provide personal financial planning services to high-net-worth clients.

== See also ==
- Financial adviser
- Financial planner
- Investment advisor
- Wealth management
