= British Columbia Human Rights Tribunal =

Canadian human rights authority

Agency overview
- Jurisdiction: Government of British Columbia
- Employees: 30
- Agency executive: Emily Ohler, Chair
- Key document: B.C. Human Rights Code
- Website: https://www.bchrt.bc.ca/

The British Columbia Human Rights Tribunal is a quasi-judicial human rights body in British Columbia, Canada. It was established under British Columbia's Human Rights Code. It is responsible for "accepting, screening, mediating and adjudicating human rights complaints."

== History ==
Responsibility for the province's Human Rights Code was originally divided between the BC Human Rights Commission, which was responsible for investigation and compliance, and the Tribunal, which was solely an adjudicative body. In 2003, the government of Gordon Campbell abolished the Commission as well as the BC Human Rights Advisory Council as a cost-saving measure while expanding the responsibilities of the Tribunal. In 2018, however, changes to the Human Rights Code re-established British Columbia's Human Rights Commissioner, this time as an independent officer of the Legislature, to address issues of systemic discrimination, including by intervening in Tribunal proceedings.

During the COVID-19 pandemic, the BCHRT was "overwhelmed" with complaints related to mask-wearing requirements and COVID-19 vaccine mandates, contributing to significant delays. The BCHRT received 2,431 new complaints in 2020, nearly double its operating capacity of 1,000-1,200 complaints annually. On March 21, 2022, the Tribunal enacted an emergency pause on processing complaints related to face mask requirements. It went into effect on March 31, 2022 until further notice. Processing of mask-related complaints resumed in April 2023.

== Notable cases ==
=== Smith v. Knights of Columbus ===
In 2005, the Tribunal ordered a Knights of Columbus council in Port Coquitlam, BC, to pay damages of $1,000 to a lesbian couple for discrimination on the basis of sexual orientation. The council's hall manager had signed a contract with the women for the use of their facilities, and then cancelled when he became aware that it was for a same-sex wedding reception. The two women said they were unaware that the facility was affiliated with the Catholic Church. The tribunal ruled the council would be within its rights to refuse to rent the hall based on their religious convictions, but awarded damages to the women "for injury to dignity, feelings and self-respect" as a result of the cancellation of the contract.

=== Datt v. McDonald's Restaurants ===
In 2007, McDonald's Restaurants of Canada was ordered to pay an employee $50,000 plus interest to compensate her for lost income, dignity and self-respect. The employee was a long-time employee at a Vancouver McDonald's restaurant who eventually acquired a skin condition which made hand washing painful. McDonald's corporate policy, BC's Health Act and its Food Premises Regulation, along with the BC Centre for Disease Control, require or recommend rigorous hygiene policies on the part of food handlers. At McDonald's restaurants all staff members, including the manager, are required to handle food. McDonald's granted the employee disability leave three times while she consulted doctors and tried various lotions, but after two and on half years, the employee was dismissed from her job. The tribunal ruled McDonald's had not done enough to accommodate her skin condition.

=== Eva v. Spruce Hill Resort ===
In 2018, the Tribunal awarded over $173,000 in total to seven former employees of the Spruce Hill Resort and Spa in Cariboo, who said the owner discriminated against them because they were Caucasian. Tribunal chair Diana Juricevic found "that over a period of months, the owner repeatedly said that he wanted to replace Caucasian employees with ethnically Chinese employees to reduce labour costs." All the complainants had either quit or were fired in August 2016.

=== Yaniv v. Various Waxing Salons ===
In 2018, Jessica Yaniv filed discrimination complaints against 13 waxing salons alleging that they refused to provide Brazilian waxes to her because she is transgender. In their defence, estheticians said they lacked training on waxing male genitalia and they were not comfortable doing so for personal or religious reasons. Thus, for them, being transgender was not the issue, but having male genitalia. Oral arguments were heard on five separate dates in July 2019. The case garnered significant international attention, including a segment on Tucker Carlson's Fox News channel show. It was also cited as a factor in the Australian Liberal–National Coalition's decision to oppose a proposed gender self-identification law in Victoria, Australia.

In October 2019, the Tribunal ruled against Yaniv and ordered her to pay $6,000 in restitution split equally among three of the female service providers. The ruling was critical of Yaniv, stating that she "targeted small businesses, manufactured the conditions for a human rights complaint, and then leveraged that complaint to pursue a financial settlement from parties who were unsophisticated and unlikely to mount a proper defence", and admonished her for using human rights law as a "weapon" to "penalize" marginalized women with a racial animus and for filing in such a volume for financial gain. For this reason, the court ruled not only that, since none of the salons advertised waxing services for male genitals, they did not discriminate against Yaniv on the basis of her gender identity, but also rejected the complaint regarding the refusal to wax Yaniv's arms and legs. Yaniv's application for the tribunal to reconsider its decision was denied.

On January 7, 2020, the Justice Centre for Constitutional Freedoms, which had represented three of the respondents, announced it was representing another salon in an additional complaint filed by Yaniv in early October 2019.

In August 2020, Yaniv filed a civil suit against the three previous respondents for $11,800.

=== COVID-19 ===
The BCHRT established strict requirements for complaints related to mask-wearing requirements. It clarified that the Human Rights Code does not cover objections to mask mandates on grounds of someone's personal beliefs, but does protect people unable to wear a mask due to a protected characteristic such as disability.

In August 2021, the BCHRT ruled that persons with a disability claiming exemption from mask requirements are required to inform the service provider that they require "some form of disability-related accommodation," but don't need to divulge specific details about their disability for privacy reasons.

== See also ==
- Canadian Human Rights Tribunal
- Canadian Human Rights Commission
- Saskatchewan Human Rights Commission
- Alberta Human Rights Commission
