= Mutual Fund Dealers Association =

Former Canadian self-regulatory organization

- Abbreviation: MFDA
- Formation: 1998
- Type: Organizations based in Canada
- Legal status: active
- Purpose: monitors members for compliance and enforces regulations through quasi-judicial proceedings
- Headquarters: Toronto, Ontario, Canada
- Region served: Canada
- Members: Canadian mutual fund providers
- Official language: English, French
- Budget: C$33.284M (FY2020)
- Website: www.mfda.ca

The Mutual Fund Dealers Association of Canada (MFDA) was a Canadian self-regulatory organization (SRO) that provided oversight to dealers that distribute mutual funds and exempt fixed income products. It was licensed under all Canadian provincial securities regulators (except Quebec, where it cooperates with the Autorité des marchés financiers (AMF) instead). Its members consisted of the distribution side of the industry that typically provide mutual funds and exempt fixed income products to Canadians through financial planners.

It worked in parallel to another Canadian SRO, the Investment Industry Regulatory Organization of Canada (IIROC), which was responsible for the distribution of equities, exchange traded funds (ETFs), and other exchange traded products such as closed-end funds.

On January 1, 2023, the MFDA was merged into the Canadian Investment Regulatory Organization (CIRO).

== History ==
The MFDA was created in June 1998 through an initiative by the Canadian Securities Administrators (CSA) in response to the rapid growth of mutual funds in Canada in the late 1980s.

As of July 2013, the MFDA represented 115 mutual fund dealer members. These members include 81,134 approved persons and $359.4 billion in investor assets, commonly referred to as Assets under Administration (AUA).

As of September 2018, the MFDA represented 91 mutual fund dealer members. These members include 80,177 approved persons and $561 billion in Assets under Administration ("AUA").

As of October 2019, the MFDA represented 90 mutual fund dealer members. These members include 79,789 approved persons and $570.968 billion in Assets under Administration.

As of February 2020, the MFDA represented 91 mutual fund dealer members. These members include 78,256 approved persons and $573.664 billion in Assets under Administration.

In January 2023 MFDA merged with the Investment Industry Regulatory Organization of Canada (IIROC) to form the Canadian Investment Regulatory Organization (CIRO).

== Purpose and structure ==
The MFDA regulated the operations, standards of practice and business conduct of its members and their representatives with a mandate to enhance investor protection and strengthen public confidence in the Canadian mutual fund industry.

The mutual fund dealerships collectively and formally represented themselves to the MFDA through the Federation of Mutual Fund Dealers, which later rebranded as the Federation of Independent Dealers.

== See also ==
- Canadian securities regulation
- Autorité des marchés financiers (Québec)
