= Saskatchewan Human Rights Commission =

Canadian human rights authority

Saskatchewan Human Rights Commission Commission des droits de la personne de la Saskatchewan
- Logo of the Saskatchewan Human Rights Commission

Agency overview
- Formed: 1972
- Type: Human rights dispute resolution
- Jurisdiction: Saskatchewan
- Headquarters: Saskatoon
- Annual budget: $2,606,000 (2022-2023)
- Minister responsible: Minister of Justice and Attorney General of Saskatchewan
- Agency executive: Chief Commissioner
- Key document: The Saskatchewan Human Rights Code, 2018, SS 2018, c S-24.2
- Website: saskatchewanhumanrights.ca

The Saskatchewan Human Rights Commission (French: Commission des droits de la personne de la Saskatchewan) is a body within the Government of Saskatchewan whose mission is "To promote and protect the individual dignity, fundamental freedoms and equal rights of Saskatchewan citizens." It enforces the Saskatchewan Human Rights Code.

Its mission is to prevent and eliminate discrimination; to investigate and resolve complaints of discrimination promptly and effectively; to provide support and remedial action to individuals and groups suffering from discrimination; to promote, approve and monitor equality programs; It is to research and promote educational strategies to advance the principles. Respect equality and diversity, promote understanding of human rights issues, promote leadership in the development and implementation of human rights-related public policies, and promote progress in legislation and human rights protection.

== History of Human Rights in Saskatchewan ==
"Saskatchewan’s strong tradition of protecting human rights developed within a national and international context. In response to the tragic lessons learned from World War II, nations of the world came together to establish common principles for protecting the rights of "all members of the human family" and adopted the Universal Declaration of Human Rights in 1948.

One year earlier, Saskatchewan began its tradition of protecting human rights by passing the first general human rights legislation in North America, The Saskatchewan Bill of Rights Act, 1947. It proclaimed the fundamental freedoms of every individual, such as freedom of expression, association and religion.

In the 1950s, Saskatchewan expanded equality rights in important ways. The Equal Pay Act, 1952 prohibited employers from paying women less than men for comparable work in the same establishment. The Fair Employment Practices Act and The Fair Accommodation Practices Act expanded the prohibitions against discrimination in employment and accommodation contained in the Bill of Rights.

In 1972, Saskatchewan took a further step in the protection of rights by establishing the Human Rights Commission. The commission was given the responsibility of administering Saskatchewan's anti-discrimination laws and promoting the principle of equality through public education. In that year, sex was added as a prohibited ground of discrimination in the Bill of Rights and in other fair practices legislation.

The Saskatchewan Human Rights Code came into effect in 1979. It amalgamated and improved upon the human rights statutes passed since 1947. At that time, the Code prohibited discrimination on the basis of a number of specified grounds: race, creed, religion, colour, sex, marital status, physical disability, age, nationality, ancestry and place of origin. It governs relationships between people in important public areas of life, such as education, employment, trade unions and professional associations, public contracts, purchase of property, rental accommodation and public services. The Code also contains protection from the distribution of hate literature.

Since 1979, additional grounds have been added to the Code, including mental disability in 1989, and sexual orientation, family status and receipt of public assistance in 1993. Gender identity was added as a prohibited ground in 2014.

The commission's budget was $2,606,000 in fiscal 2022–2023.

== Structural changes of the Saskatchewan Human Rights Commission 2010-2011 ==
=== The Saskatchewan Human Rights Tribunal Eliminated ===
"The Saskatchewan Human Rights Code Amendment Act, 2010, S.S. 2011, c. 17 (former Bill 160), was proclaimed in force on July 1, 2011. The overall purpose of the Act is to make the human rights complaints process more timely and flexible by streamlining the process for dealing with complaints and allowing more cases to be resolved without litigation.

A major and, according to some, welcome change is the elimination of the Saskatchewan Human Rights Tribunal and the transfer of the tribunal’s powers to the Saskatchewan Court of Queen’s Bench, which will hear complaints that cannot be resolved by alternative dispute resolution methods."

=== Reason for the Tribunal's elimination and the shift to the Queen's (King's) Bench for adjudication ===
"Full-time judges are imminently qualified to hear such cases, which are too important to be relegated to administrative adjudicatory bodies overseen by lawyers “acting as part-time quasi judges,” said the SHRC."

"The decision [to eliminate the Tribunal] stems from the governing party’s view that the Tribunal currently lacks judicial independence. Reformists are quick to point out that the Tribunal does not have security of tenure, financial security and does not benefit from administrative independence. They argue that members of the public cannot differentiate between the Commission and the Tribunal. This perception, according to the Saskatchewan Party, has compromised the public’s confidence in the system and needs to be remedied."

=== Dissolution of the Saskatchewan Human Rights Tribunal ===
In 2010 the Saskatchewan government announced its plan to dissolve the province's Human Rights Tribunal. According to Saskatchewan's Justice Minister, Don Morgan, the change could occur as early as spring of 2010 if it is streamlined as planned.

"The Saskatchewan Human Rights Tribunal is an independent, quasi-judicial provincial body that has the mandate of adjudicating human rights complaints brought under the province’s Human Rights Code. In a nutshell, the Tribunal conducts public hearings of human rights complaints that have been referred to the Tribunal by Saskatchewan’s Human Rights Commission. At a tribunal hearing, the parties are provided with an opportunity to make submissions and adduce evidence to support their case. At the conclusion of the hearing, the Tribunal issues a decision which is subject to appeal to the Queen’s Bench.

Saskatchewan’s Human Rights Tribunal is separate from Saskatchewan’s Human Rights Commission. Both administrative bodies are completely independent, have different mandates and have distinct administrative processes. The Commission’s role is to receive and investigate complaints. In some cases, the Commission will refer complaints to the Tribunal for adjudication.

According to the proposed dissolution of the Tribunal, the Commission will refer human rights complaints directly to the Queen’s Bench for adjudication. If implemented, the system would be unique to the province of Saskatchewan."

== Adjudication of human rights complaints ==
Prior the 2011 amendments, the Saskatchewan Human Rights Commission referred the complaints to the Saskatchewan Human Rights Tribunal for adjudication.

After the amendment of the Saskatchewan Human Rights Code in 2011, "the human rights tribunal system in Saskatchewan was eliminated. As a result, the tribunal’s adjudicative role and function was shifted to the Court of Queen’s Bench."

This illustrates that the Saskatchewan Human Rights Commission as an independent administrative body never had any adjudicative authority, neither prior nor post passing of Bill 160 respectively.

With the abolition of the administrative Saskatchewan Human Rights Tribunal the adjudicative function was shifted to the Court of Queens Bench.

== See also ==
- Canadian Human Rights Tribunal
- Canadian Human Rights Commission
- British Columbia Human Rights Tribunal
- Ontario Human Rights Commission
