= Investment Executive =

- Categories: Business
- Frequency: 12 per year
- Founded: 1989
- Company: Transcontinental Media
- Country: Canada
- Based in: Toronto
- Language: English
- Website: www.investmentexecutive.com
- ISSN: 1202-7405

Investment Executive is a Canadian trade publication for financial advisors which is published 12 times per year by Transcontinental Media.

== History and profile ==
Investment Executive was founded in 1989, and acquired by Transcontinental Media in 1999. It stated in 2016 that its readership reached more than 120,000 financial advisors and others in the financial services industry; the figure was 31,000 in 2022. Finance et Investissement, sister magazine of Investment Executive, offers similar content for francophone financial advisors in Quebec since 1999.
