= Public Service Grievance Board =

When employees in the Ontario Public Service (the "OPS"), who are not represented by a union, have a complaint about a term or condition of employment they may be able to take that complaint before the Public Service Grievance Board (the "PSGB").

== Constituting Statute ==
The PSGB is created under the Public Service of Ontario Act ("PSOA") to give certain non-unionized OPS employees the ability to put their complaint about the terms and conditions of their employment to binding arbitration.

The regulation titled Public Service Grievance Board: Complaints and Hearing details:

- the time-line for filing a complaint;
- restrictions on what can be complained about; and,
- the process of filing a complaint.

== Restrictions on complaints ==
The regulation places certain restrictions on what can be complained about. The set of arbitrable issues is dependent on the type of position the employee has in the managerial hierarchy. Rights to complain about a term and condition are very restricted for those in senior management position as compared to operation (front line) managers.

== Authorities ==
When reviewing a complaint, the PSGB may examine among other things: the PSOA, and its regulations, the employers policies and established practices and employment related statutes that bind the Crown such as the Human Rights Code.

When interpreting these sources, the PSGB will look to its own past decisions (which are generally binding), as well as those of the Grievance Settlement Board (the "GSB") and other arbitral court decisions,

The GSB is the board of arbitration that oversees the terms and conditions of unionized employees of the OPS and as such its decisions are very persuasive because of the similarity of the subject matter.

== Process ==
The processes governing how a complaint is filed are laid out in the above-mentioned regulation. Once the complaint has been filed, the Board as some, albeit limited, procedural rules available on its website. Where these rules are silent the PSGB's processes are governed by the Statutory Powers and Procedures Act.

== Decisions ==
The decisions of the PSGB are posted at Canadian Legal Information Institute.
