= Ontario Securities Commission =

Canadian provincial securities regulatory agency

Agency overview
- Formed: 1932
- Type: Crown agency
- Jurisdiction: Government of Ontario
- Headquarters: Suite 1903, 20 Queen Street West, Toronto, Ontario, Canada
- Employees: 500
- Agency executives: D. Grant Vingoe, CEO; Kevan Blair Cowan, Chairman
- Website: osc.gov.on.ca

The Ontario Securities Commission (OSC; French: Commission des valeurs mobilières de l’Ontario) is a Crown agency of the Government of Ontario that administers and enforces securities legislation in the Canadian province of Ontario. Established in 1932 and subsequently amended through significant legislative reforms in 1945–47 and 1966, the Commission continues as an agent of the Crown in right of Ontario and is accountable to the Legislative Assembly of Ontario through the Minister of Finance.

Canada does not have a national securities regulator, and each province and territory regulates its own capital markets; OSC regulates the capital markets in Ontario. Other notable provincial regulators include the Alberta Securities Commission, the Autorité des marchés financiers (Québec), and the British Columbia Securities Commission.

The OSC's mandate is to:

- Protect investors from unfair, improper and fraudulent practices
- Foster fair and efficient capital markets
- Maintain public and investor confidence in the integrity of those markets
- Contribute to the stability of the financial system and the reduction of systemic risk

The OSC administers the Ontario Securities Act and the Commodity Futures Act and with about 500 employees, is the largest securities regulator in Canada and has the Toronto Stock Exchange within its jurisdiction.

== Leadership ==
=== Chairman ===
From inception, the OSC was run by a chairman who was the de facto chief executive of the commission. Following the proclamation of the Securities Commission Act, 2021 on 29 April 2022, a separate chief executive officer was created and the chairman became a non-executive office.

1. George Alexander Drew, 1 May 1931 – 1 October 1934
2. John Milton Godfrey, October 1934 – 25 January 1938
3. Roy Beverly Whitehead, February 1938 – June 1944
4. William Arthur Brant, June 1944 – 30 October 1944 †
5. Charles Patrick McTague, 18 October 1945 – June 1948
6. Oswald Elmer Lennox, June 1948 – 31 December 1962 †
7. John Robert Kimber, 8 June 1963 – 28 February 1967
8. Henry Eden Langford, 1 March 1967 – 31 July 1969
9. Edward Allen Royce, 1 August 1969 – 31 August 1974
10. Arthur Sydney Pattillo, 1 September 1974 – 31 October 1977
  Harry Slocomb Bray (acting), 1 November 1977 – 2 January 1978
11. James Cameron Baillie, 3 January 1978 – 30 June 1980
12. Henry Joseph Knowles, 1 July 1980 – 31 December 1983
13. Peter James Dey, 4 January 1983 – 30 April 1984
14. Stanley Martin David Beck, 1 May 1984 – 31 August 1989
15. Robert James Wright, 1 September 1989 – 1 September 1993
  Joan Christine Smart (acting), 1 September 1993 – 31 October 1993
16. Edward James Waitzer, 1 November 1993 – 31 October 1996
  John Arthur Geller (acting), 1 November 1996 – 15 April 1998
17. David Arthur Brown, 15 April 1998 – 30 June 2005
  Susan Wolburgh Jenah (acting), 1 July 2005 – 31 October 2005
18. William David Wilson, 1 November 2005 – 31 October 2010
19. Howard Isadore Wetston, 1 November 2010 – 14 November 2015
  Monica Kowal (acting), 14 November 2015 – 10 February 2016
20. Maureen Jensen, 10 February 2016 – 15 April 2020
  David Grant Vingoe (acting), 15 April 2020 – 29 April 2022
21. Heather Louise Zordel, 29 April 2022 – 21 October 2022
22. Kevan Blair Cowan, 15 December 2022 – present

=== Chief Executive Officer ===
Upon the proclamation of the Securities Commission Act, 2021 on 29 April 2022, the duties of chairman and chief executive were separated and a new office of the chief executive officer was created. The CEO is also a director of the commission.

1. David Grant Vingoe, 29 April 2022 – present

== See also ==
- Alberta Securities Commission
- Autorité des marchés financiers (Québec)
- British Columbia Securities Commission
- Canadian securities regulation
- Canadian Securities Administrators
- Financial Services Regulatory Authority of Ontario
- Glorianne Stromberg, former commissioner
- List of financial supervisory authorities by country
