= British Columbia Securities Commission =

Regulatory agency in British Columbia, Canada

- Commission des valeurs mobilières de la Colombie-Britannique

Agency overview
- Formed: 1996
- Jurisdiction: Canadian province of British Columbia
- Headquarters: Vancouver, British Columbia, Canada
- Employees: 190
- Agency executive: Brenda Leong, Chair and Chief Executive Officer
- Website: www.bcsc.bc.ca

The British Columbia Securities Commission (BCSC) is a Crown corporation and securities regulator responsible for administering and enforcing securities legislation and regulating capital markets in the Canadian province of British Columbia.

Established and continued under the Securities Act, the Commission is an agent of the Government of British Columbia and is responsible for overseeing securities and derivatives markets in the province. The Act grants the Commission powers to make decisions in the public interest concerning exchanges, self-regulatory organizations, trading systems, clearing agencies, issuers, and market participants.

== See also ==
- Canadian securities regulation
- Securities Commission
- Canadian Securities Administrators
- Ontario Securities Commission
- Autorité des marchés financiers (Québec)
- List of financial supervisory authorities by country
