= Canadian Securities Administrators =

Government regulatory organization

- Industry: Securities
- Headquarters: CSA Secretariat: Tour de la Bourse, 800 Square Victoria, Montreal, QC
- Area served: Canada
- Services: National Registration Database (NRD); System for Electronic Disclosure by Insiders (SEDI); System for Electronic Document Analysis and Retrieval (SEDAR)
- Website: www.securities-administrators.ca

The Canadian Securities Administrators (CSA; French: Autorités canadiennes en valeurs mobilières, ACVM) is an umbrella organization of Canada's provincial and territorial securities regulators whose objective is to improve, coordinate, and harmonize regulation of the Canadian capital markets.

The CSA's national systems include the National Registration Database (NRD), a web-based database that allows security dealers and investment advisors to file registration forms electronically; the System for Electronic Disclosure by Insiders (SEDI), an online, browser-based service for the filing and viewing of insider trading reports; and the System for Electronic Document Analysis and Retrieval (SEDAR), a publicly-accessible database that contains all the required non-confidential filings related to publicly traded Canadian companies.

The CSA serves a regulatory function comparable to that of the Securities and Exchange Commission (SEC) and the Commodity Futures Trading Commission (CFTC) in the United States.

== History ==
As an informal body, the CSA originally functioned primarily through meetings, conference calls, and day-to-day collaborations with the various territorial and provincial securities regulatory authorities. In 2003, the CSA was restructured into a more formal organization, in which the chair and vice-chair were elected by members to 2-year terms.

In 2004, the CSA established a permanent secretariat, located in Montreal. Among other things, the secretariat monitors and coordinates the work of various CSA committees on policy initiatives.

In 2016, the CSA adopted a passport system through which market participants can access to markets in all passport jurisdictions by dealing only with its principal regulator and complying with one set of harmonized laws. While the CSA co-ordinates initiatives on a cross-Canada basis, the 10 provinces and 3 territories in Canada are responsible for securities regulations and their enforcement. This provides a more direct and efficient service since each regulator is closer to its local investors and market participants.

== Structure ==
The CSA established a permanent Secretariat in March 2004 in Montreal to provide the organizational stability necessary for CSA to function efficiently. The CSA Secretariat also monitors and coordinates the work of various CSA committees on policy initiatives.

=== Members ===
The CSA consists of the securities regulators of the 10 provincial and 3 territorial governments of Canada. The CSA Chairs are the respective chairs of the securities regulators of the 10 provinces and 3 territories of Canada. They meet quarterly in person. A chair and vice-chair of the CSA are elected by members for two year terms.

CSA officials, as of April 2025
Title	Name	Other roles
Chair	Stan Magidson	Chair and Chief Executive Officer of Alberta Securities Commission
Vice-chair	David Cheop	Chair and Chief Executive Officer of Manitoba Securities Commission
Secretary General	Laura Belloni	
Chair of the Policy Coordination Committee	Grant Vingoe	Chair and CEO of the Ontario Securities Commission

CSA members, as of April 2025
Province/territory	Securities regulator	
Alberta	Stan Magidson, Chair and Chief Executive Officer	Alberta Securities Commission
British Columbia	Brenda Leong, Chair and Chief Executive Officer	British Columbia Securities Commission
Manitoba	David Cheop, Chair and Chief Executive Officer	Manitoba Securities Commission
New Brunswick	Kevin Hoyt, Chief Executive Officer	Financial and Consumer Services Commission
Newfoundland and Labrador	Loyola Power, Superintendent	Office of the Superintendent of Securities
Northwest Territories	Matthew F. Yap, Superintendent of Securities	Office of the Superintendent of Securities
Nova Scotia	Valerie Seager, Chair	Nova Scotia Securities Commission
Nunavut		Office of the Superintendent of Securities
Ontario	D. Grant Vingoe, Chief Executive Officer	Ontario Securities Commission
Prince Edward Island	Steve Dowling, Director	Financial and Consumer Services Division
Quebec	Yves Ouellet, President and CEO	Autorité des marchés financiers
Saskatchewan	Roger Sobotkiewicz, Chair and CEO	Financial and Consumer Affairs Authority of Saskatchewan
Yukon	Fred Pretorius, Superintendent of Securities	Office of the Yukon Superintendent of Securities

=== Committees ===
==== Standing and project committees ====
Each CSA member has its own staff who work on policy development and deliver regulatory programs through their participation in CSA Committees, which can include permanent committees and project committees. The latter are formed to work on specific policy projects, and can deal with subjects such as short- and long-form prospectuses, continuous disclosure, proportionate regulation, and investor confidence.

Standing committees include: Executive Directors, Enforcement, Market Oversight, Registrant Regulation, Investment Funds and Investor Education.

==== Policy Coordination Committee ====
In August 2003, the CSA established the Policy Coordination Committee, which oversees CSA's policy development initiatives, facilitates decision-making, as well as acting as a forum for resolution of policy development issues, monitors ongoing issues, and provides recommendations to the CSA chairs for their resolution.

Its members are the chairs of eight regulators—Alberta, British Columbia, Manitoba, New Brunswick, Nova Scotia, Ontario, Québec, and Saskatchewan. As of May 2021, the committee's chair is Grant Vingoe, the acting chair and Chief Executive Officer of the Ontario Securities Commission.

== CSA disclosure systems ==
The CSA maintains several databases that contain information on public companies' disclosure and insider reporting, the registration of dealers and advisers, and a cease trade order database (CTO).

- System for Electronic Document Analysis and Retrieval (SEDAR) — the system that public companies and investment funds use to file public securities documents and information with the CSA. There is also a XBRL Filing Program within SEDAR. SEDAR is the Canadian equivalent of the U.S. Securities and Exchange Commission's EDGAR.
- System for Electronic Disclosure by Insiders (SEDI) — Canada's online, browser-based service for the filing and viewing of insider trading reports as required by various provincial securities rules and regulations.
- National Registration Database (NRD) — a web-based system that permits dealers and advisers to file registration forms electronically. The National Registration Search (NRS) contains the names of all registrants (individuals and firms) in Canada.
- National CTO Database — the cease trade order publicly searchable database, contains all orders issued by participating CSA members, regardless of whether their effect is temporary or indefinite, and disseminates such orders to CTO subscribers.

=== National Registration Database ===
The National Registration Database (NRD) is a Canadian web-based database that allows security dealers and investment advisors to file registration forms electronically. (An individual or company in Canada who trades or underwrites securities, or provides investment advice, must register annually with one or more provincial securities regulators.) Created to replace the original paper form system, the NRD increases the efficiency of information filing and sharing between provincial security regulators.

In 2001, the CSA commissioned a study that estimated the total economic benefits of such a database to the Canadian financial services industry would be $85 million over a 5-year period. The NRD was subsequently launched in 2003, initiated by the CSA and the Investment Industry Regulatory Organization of Canada (IIROC).

The NRD has two websites: the NRD Information Website, which contains information for the public; and the National Registration Database, for use by authorized representatives. The National Registration Search (NRS) contains the names of all registrants (individuals and firms) in Canada.

=== System for Electronic Document Analysis and Retrieval ===
The System for Electronic Document Analysis and Retrieval (SEDAR) is a mandatory, electronic document filing and retrieval system that allows listed Canadian public companies to report their securities-related information with Canada's securities regulation authorities. It is operated and administered by CGI Information Systems and Management Consultants Inc. (CGI), the filing service contractor appointed by the Canadian Securities Administrators.

It is similar to EDGAR, the filing system operated by the U.S. Securities and Exchange Commission for American public companies.

Through registered filing agents, public companies file documents such as prospectuses, financial statements, and material change reports. In the interest of transparency and full disclosure, these documents are accessible to the public. The reports that are available on SEDAR indicate the fiscal health of public companies and investment funds, and investors who want specific materials on a specific company can search the SEDAR database for the company or investment fund. These searches can be made by company name, industry group, document type or date filed; its results are rendered in PDF format.

The SEDAR database was established by the CSA in 1997. Documents filed with regulators prior to the implementation of SEDAR may be available from the individual securities commissions; however, in the case of the British Columbia Securities Commission, historical filings are unretrievable and may have been destroyed.

On July 25, 2023, the CSA transitioned from SEDAR to SEDAR+. SEDAR+ improves on the original database by consolidating it with the national Cease Trade Order and Disciplined List (DL) databases. Other updated features include extended operating hours, an integrated fee calculator, and a portal for filing exemptive relief applications.

== Regulatory cooperation ==
Regulatory cooperation occurs both at national and international levels for the CSA.

Among themselves, CSA members work closely in the development of new policy initiatives and the continuous improvement of the regulatory framework for securities. They further coordinate its regulatory initiatives with the Joint Forum of Financial Services.

Various CSA members are also active in international organizations such the North American Securities Administrators Association (NASAA), Council of Securities Regulators of the Americas (COSRA), and the International Organization of Securities Commissions (IOSCO), representing North-American, Pan-American, and international securities regulators respectively.

=== Pan-Canadian cooperation ===
==== "Passport" system ====
Passport is a regulatory system that provides market participants automatic access to the capital markets in all Canadian jurisdictions, except Ontario, by registering only with its principal regulator and meeting the requirements of one set of harmonized laws. In brief, the system provides market participants with streamlined access to Canada's capital markets.

Participants of the Passport system are the governments of all Canadian provinces and territories, excluding Ontario. To access the market in Ontario, non-Ontario market participants may use an interface system in which the Ontario Securities Commission (OSC) makes its own decisions, but generally relies on the review by the principal regulator. To achieve maximum efficiency for the benefit of the market, the passport regulators accept the OSC's decisions under Passport.

==== Joint Forum of Financial Markets Regulators ====
The Joint Forum of Financial Market Regulators coordinates and streamlines the regulation of products and services in the Canadian financial markets.

The Forum includes representatives of the CSA, along with those of the Canadian Council of Insurance Regulators (CCIR) and the Canadian Association of Pension Supervisory Authorities (CAPSA); it also includes representation from the Canadian Insurance Services Regulatory Organizations (CISRO).

The Joint Forum was founded in 1999 by CSA, CCIR, and CAPSA.

== Other activities ==
=== Harmonization of securities regulations ===
The CSA brings together provincial and territorial securities regulators to share information and design policies and regulations that are consistent across the country, ensuring the smooth operation of Canada's securities industry. By collaborating on rules, regulations, and other programs, the CSA helps avoid duplication of work and streamlines the regulatory process for companies seeking to raise investment capital and others working in the investment industry.

As a result of the coordination efforts of the CSA, securities markets are governed by harmonized national or multilateral instruments, which are assigned uniform 5-digit numbers, starting with a number that represents one of the 9 subject matter categories:

1. Procedure and Related Matters
2. Certain Capital Market Participants
3. Registration Requirements and Related Matters
4. Distribution Requirements
5. Ongoing Requirements for Issuers and Insiders
6. Takeover Bids and Special Transactions
7. Securities Transactions Outside the Jurisdiction
8. Investment Funds
9. Derivatives

=== Investor education ===
The CSA's impact on most Canadians comes through its efforts to help educate Canadians about the securities industry, the stock markets and how to protect investors from investment scams. The CSA provides a wide variety of educational materials on securities and investing. It has produced brochures and booklets explaining various topics such as how to choose a financial adviser, mutual funds, and investing via the internet. The CSA coordinates various annual investor education initiatives, including the Financial Literacy Month in November and the Fraud Prevention Month in March.

=== Communications and public information tools ===
The CSA publishes on its website a wide range of communications and public information tools, including news releases regarding newly adopted or proposed national or multilateral rules and regulations, investor education materials, enforcement reports and materials and investor research studies.

- Annual Enforcement Report — While most enforcement activity is conducted locally, CSA members also coordinate multi-jurisdictional investigations and share tools and techniques that help their staff investigate and prosecute securities law violations that cross borders. Every year, the CSA publishes on its website an Enforcement Report, which provides an overview of enforcement actions taken by CSA members in such broad categories as fraud, illegal distribution, misconduct by registrants, illegal insider trading, disclosure violations, and market manipulation.
- Investor Alerts — The CSA maintains on its website a non-exhaustive list of CSA member investor alerts to assist the public and the securities industry in conducting due diligence. The subjects of these alerts are persons and/or companies who appear to be engaging in securities activities that may pose a risk to investors.
- Disciplined Persons List — The disciplined persons list, maintained by the CSA on its website, is intended to assist the public and the securities industry in conducting due diligence. It contains orders issued by its members, as well as those issued by self-regulatory organizations (SROs).

== See also ==
Canada

- Financial Consumer Agency of Canada
- Autorité des marchés financiers (Québec)
- Alberta Securities Commission
- Ontario Securities Commission
- British Columbia Securities Commission

USA

- EDGAR

Other

- International Organization of Securities Commissions (IOSCO)
- North American Securities Administrators Association (NASAA)
- List of stock exchanges
- List of stock exchanges in the Americas
- List of stock exchanges in the Commonwealth of Nations
