= Raiz =

Raiz may refer to:

- Raiz, Iran
- a capoeira technique; see List of capoeira techniques#Raiz
- Raíz (album), a 2014 album by singers Lila Downs, Niña Pastori and Soledad Pastorutti
- Raiz (Cuca Roseta album), a 2013 album by fado singer Cuca Roseta
- Raiz (company) an Australian Micro-investments app
