= Fintech in Australia =

Fintech in Australia is the evolving intersection of financial services and advanced technology in the Australian market. It involves innovations in banking, investment, insurance, and personal finance, facilitated by technologies such as blockchain and artificial intelligence.

== History ==
The history of Australian fintech began with early online banking services and has since expanded to include a wide range of financial technologies. This growth has been marked by the emergence of startups and the adoption of cutting-edge technologies, reshaping the way financial services are provided.

In the early 2000s, the sector witnessed a surge in innovation, particularly with the advent of mobile banking. This period marked a shift from traditional online platforms to more sophisticated, app-based services that offered enhanced user experiences and greater accessibility. Australian banks and financial institutions began investing heavily in mobile technologies, recognizing the growing consumer demand for on-the-go financial management. Treasury management software provider Visual Risk was founded in 2001.

The mid-2010s saw a further expansion of the branch in Australia with the introduction of blockchain technology and the rise of cryptocurrencies and a significant presence of startups in its implementation.

The robo adviser Stockspot was launched in 2014, followed by QuietGrowth in 2015.

== Key players ==
The key players in the Australian fintech sector consist of both established financial institutions and innovative startups. Traditional banks like the Bank of Australia, Westpac, ANZ, and National Australia Bank have been pivotal in adopting and integrating fintech in the country. These banks have invested significantly in digital transformation, developing their own mobile banking apps, and collaborating with fintech firms to offer services like instant digital payments and financial management tools.

Notable fintech startups include Afterpay, Paypa Plane, Airwallex, Raiz, Zip Co and Open.

Fintech Australia is the leading advocacy body for fintech in Australia.

== Regulatory environment ==
The Australian government has implemented numerous policies regulating the industry. Regulatory bodies like the Australian Securities and Investments Commission (ASIC) and the Australian Prudential Regulation Authority (APRA) have set guidelines and frameworks to maintain financial stability and integrity in the face of technological advancements.

As fintech companies are financial service companies as such, their activity is mainly regulated under the Corporations Act administered by ASIC. In order to operate, such companies are obliged to hold an Australian Market Licence. The information on the activity is held by APRA under the Financial Sector Collection of Data Act 2001 which also administers the Banking Executive Accountability Regime, also known as BEAR.

== See also ==
- Fintech
- Cryptocurrency in Australia
- Australian Financial Review
