= Discretionary investment management =

Form of professional investment management

Discretionary investment management is a form of professional investment management in which investments are made on behalf of clients through a variety of securities. The term "discretionary" refers to investment decisions being made by the investment manager based on the investment manager's judgement rather than under the direction of the client. The major aim of the services offered is to outperform benchmarks listed in the mandate; this is called providing alpha.

The investment management company has a continuous responsibility to ensure that an investment portfolio is suitable for the client's attitude to risk and investment objectives. The services provided are usually tailored for institutional business, pension funds and high-net worth individuals. The services are increasingly accessible to a broader range of clients through robo advisors.

Unlike discretionary investment management, do-it-yourself investing requires the individual to research, select, and manage investments by themselves.

== Investment products ==
Discretionary investment managers may manage investments in any type of securities, according to the investment manager's strategy. The most common investment products are stocks, bonds, ETFs and financial derivatives. All the investment products in the scope of the investment manager's strategy must be outlined in an investment mandate.

== Investment process ==
Due to the nature of the service, discretionary investment management firms provide a mandate in order to ensure that the services that are offered meet the aims of the client's financial goals.

The process is structured in a way for the client's capital to be invested according to the strategies specified in the investment mandate. Clients choosing a specific strategy will get the same strategy – there is no investment tailoring for the specific client, and the investment capital from a group of investors will be invested at the same time, as in a mutual fund or hedge fund, although each actual client account is segregated and the monies invested will be weighted in proportion to the individual's capital. For example, the investment manager may make a decision to invest 1% of invested funds in a particular security, so a £10,000,000 account will contribute £100,000 to the transaction whilst a £1,000,000 account will contribute £10,000.

== Investment management fees ==
Investment management fees can include:

- Assets under management (AUM) fees: Most discretionary investment management companies charge an assets under management (AUM) fee, typically at an annual rate of 0.1%–4% of the value of the managed asset portfolio.
- Transaction fees: In addition to an AUM fee, a fee may be charged when executing transactions.
- Performance fees (as a percentage of profits): This is a fee charged as a share of the profit generated for the client, usually 10%–30% of the profits. With this type of fee, the client does not need to pay when the fund is losing money.

== In the United Kingdom ==
In the UK, the regulatory authority for discretionary investment management companies is the Financial Conduct Authority. Investment managers are required to have a graduate degree or an investment qualification such as the Chartered Financial Analyst designation (CFA).

== In Australia ==
In Australia, the regulatory authority for discretionary investment management, such as Managed Discretionary Account (MDA), is the Australian Securities and Investments Commission (ASIC).

== See also ==
- Investment management
- Asset management
- Active management
- Managed account
- Separately managed account (SMA)
- Unified managed account
