= Separately managed account =

Type of individual investment account

A Separately Managed Account (SMA) is any of several different types of investment accounts in the investment management industry. For example, an SMA may be an individual managed investment account; these are often offered by a brokerage firm through one of their brokers or financial consultants and managed by independent investment management firms (often called money managers for short); they have varying fee structures. These particular types of SMAs may be called "wrap fee" or "dual contract" accounts, depending on their structure. There is no official designation for the SMA, but there are common characteristics that are represented in many types of SMA programs. These characteristics include an open structure or flexible investment security choices; multiple money managers; and a customized investment portfolio formulated for a client's specific investment objectives or desired restrictions. In hedge fund investing, the term also refers to an account or vehicle set up for a single investor, who usually owns or controls it while an appointed manager makes the investment decisions; some industry participants, including many managed account platforms, use the term dedicated managed account for their offering.

== Description and history ==
The term "SMA" is used mostly in the U.S. brokerage industry for these types of arrangements whereby an account is managed by portfolio management resources within the firm, or more commonly, by an outside money management (investment advisory) firm along with an administrator. In this context, an SMA can be thought of as an investment vehicle similar to a mutual fund, in which the customer pays a fee to a money manager for its services managing the customer's investment. The important difference is that a mutual fund investor owns shares of a company that in turn owns other investments, whereas an SMA investor owns the invested assets directly in his own name. SMAs must abide by a number of requirements, set forth in Rule 3a-4 under the Investment Company Act of 1940, to ensure they are not deemed to be unregistered investment companies.

A similar type of account or arrangement is termed a "separately managed account", "separate account", or "private account" when opened directly with investment management firms, which are not brokerage firms. The term "separate account" in this context should not be confused with separate account of an insurance company.

SMAs were developed in the 1970s to accommodate accounts and clients who needed to meet specific objectives that did not fit within the constrictions of a mutual fund investment. It is the freedom of choice of professional managers, portfolio customization, objective investment advice for a set fee, diversification (or concentration should the client choose), tax efficiency and general flexibility that have made SMAs popular among informed investors.

The ownership structure of an SMA provides an investor some tax advantages over a similarly-invested mutual fund. After purchasing mutual fund shares, an investor will have a tax liability for any net capital gains in the mutual fund portfolio, even if the investments the fund sold for a gain were purchased before the investor owned the shares of the fund. This is known as an "unearned capital gain", and has a negative effect on the investor's return from his mutual fund investment. However, because assets in an SMA are owned by the investor directly, unearned capital gains are not possible. Further, an investor in an SMA typically has the ability to direct the investment manager to sell individual securities with the objective of raising capital gains or losses for tax planning purposes. This practice is known as "tax harvesting", and its objective is to attempt to equalize capital gains and losses across all of the investor's accounts for a given year in order to reduce capital gains taxes owed.

SMAs are popular with wealthier investors and their financial advisers as they are seen as exclusive, and offer investment options not available to those of more modest means. According to the State of the Financial Advisory Industry: 2008 report, SMAs are popular picks among advisers at national broker/dealers and wealth managers. Advisers at national broker/dealers and wealth managers (defined as any financial adviser with a client asset minimum of $2 million or above) made much more aggressive allocations to SMAs than the average. The national broker/dealers allocated 29 percent to separately managed accounts, with 17 percent to mutual funds; wealth managers allocated 18 percent to separately managed accounts and 28 percent to mutual funds.

The 2008 financial crisis, and the frauds exposed at that time, served as a catalyst for hedge fund investors to move towards SMAs. As such, the SMA is evolving to accommodate expected investor demand into such structures. The unified managed account is an example of an improvement on the SMA structure as it links multiple managers and strategies to a single investor-controlled account. The configuration of the unified managed account allows whatever blend of managers selected by the investor to be more capital and operationally efficient than had the same blend been structured within an SMA or within a fund structure.

== Use in hedge fund investing ==
In this context, the term separately managed account covers arrangements that differ considerably in their legal structure. KPMG defined managed accounts in 2015 as "segregated accounts that are owned and controlled by the investor", with investment decisions delegated to an appointed hedge fund manager. A 2026 industry guide from the Alternative Investment Management Association (AIMA) says the allocator usually owns or controls the structure and delegates trading authority to the manager; the forms it describes include trading authority over an account held directly in the client's name. For its 2026 guide, the Standards Board for Alternative Investments (SBAI) defines an SMA as a dedicated limited liability fund or vehicle set up for a single investor, and says that traditional managed accounts, in which a manager trades through a brokerage or custody account on the investor's own balance sheet, should not be considered SMAs. In a 2006 column in The Hedge Fund Journal, Lois Peltz called managed account "a vague term that may include considerable territory". According to SBAI, some industry participants, including many managed account platforms, use the term dedicated managed account (DMA) to set their offering apart from broader uses of SMA. AIMA says allocators tend to be either funds, such as funds of funds and multistrategy managers allocating to external managers, or other institutions, including pension funds, endowments and sovereign wealth funds; it says pension funds and endowments seem to be a smaller part of the market, although institutional allocations have been accelerating.

=== Managed account platforms ===
Managed account platforms set up and run these vehicles for investors, and may also provide operational support, compliance oversight, risk monitoring and reporting. SBAI notes that platforms typically charge variable fees that can add to an investor's overall fees, and that using one brings an obligation to diligence and monitor the platform itself.

=== History and growth ===
Managed account platforms for hedge fund investors existed before the 2008 financial crisis; in 2006 Peltz reported estimates of $50 billion to $100 billion in assets on them, with the lower end more likely. Preqin reported in 2010 that "the credit crunch, the Madoff investment scandal, and the gating of assets" had led investors to demand more liquidity and transparency from their hedge fund portfolios, and that 16 percent of the 50 institutional investors in its survey had allocated capital to a managed account. In 2019 Pensions & Investments reported that institutional investors were increasingly obtaining tailored versions of managers' flagship strategies, which industry sources said were generally offered as separately managed accounts. In an AIMA survey of 118 hedge fund managers in early 2019, 53 percent agreed that offering customized solutions was important to aligning their interests with investors, against 14 percent in 2016. A BNP Paribas survey of 229 allocators who invest in or advise on $1.4 trillion of hedge fund assets, conducted in December 2024 and January 2025, found that 26 percent of respondents used SMAs for their hedge fund investments, which accounted for $185 billion. An internal Goldman Sachs report described by Reuters in September 2026 put hedge fund assets in SMAs at $255 billion at the end of 2025, up 20 percent from 2024, and said they made up 7.4 percent of the industry's assets; it estimated that they had grown 13 percent a year over the previous decade, and said that half of all hedge funds ran at least one, that the largest multimanager hedge funds were allocating more to them than ever, and that their popularity was growing among pension and sovereign wealth funds.

=== Advantages and disadvantages ===
AIMA's guide says the main advantages for allocators over commingled funds are often summed up as transparency, control, customization and capital efficiency, and that many accounts are run on an "unfunded" basis, in which the manager trades a notional amount and cash is put up only for actual transactions. According to SBAI, institutional investors can set their own restrictions and risk limits, see the positions in the account, own its assets, appoint independent directors, and replace a manager without selling the underlying assets. They also avoid pooled fund terms such as lockups and gates, although this flexibility "doesn't make illiquid assets liquid". AIMA's guide describes fees as a core part of the negotiation over each account. The Goldman Sachs report also said that firms using SMAs appeared to have delivered returns about 0.4 percentage points higher for SMA investors than for comparable commingled fund investors; Hedgeweek said the figure "represents an observed difference rather than evidence that the structure itself causes superior performance".

According to KPMG, the investor alone bears an account's setup and running costs, with limited scope for the cost sharing a commingled fund allows, although investors that already have service providers such as custodians in place may reduce them. KPMG expected a managed account's overall operating costs to be higher, but said specialist service providers might reduce them and that they were expected to fall as demand for managed accounts grew. Among the potential disadvantages for managers that AIMA's guide lists are added operational risk, allocating trades between the account and the manager's fund, fund investors' concern about the account's better transparency and potentially better liquidity, and the risk that an allocator might copy the strategy; AIMA says combinations of such issues often lead managers to set relatively large minimum account sizes, and in some cases to decline accounts altogether. SBAI's list of drawbacks includes high minimums, often $50 million or more, some managers' unwillingness or inability to offer their flagship strategies in this form, and returns that may diverge from those of the manager's commingled fund; a 2025 UBS survey it cites found that 43 percent of starting allocations to SMAs were below $50 million.

== Performance ==
Average 2008 performance: separately managed accounts outperformed mutual funds
Type	SMA	Mutual funds	+ / −
Large cap	−34.79	−37.9	3.11
Large cap growth	−38.44	−40.9	2.46
Large cap value	−34.94	−37.38	2.44
Middle cap	−37.13	−39.68	2.55
Small cap	−34.77	−36.88	2.11
Foreign large	−42.3	−44.06	1.76
Intermediate bond	0.73	−5.07	5.8

The Times of London reported that separately managed accounts performed much better than mutual funds in 2008, a year when the global stock market lost US$21 trillion in value.

Morningstar, Inc. found that SMAs outperformed mutual funds in 25 of 36 stock and bond market categories for not only 2008, but also 2006 and 2007. The Wall Street Journal cited top SMA performers including Robinson Value Management Ltd's Market Opportunity Composite Strategy, and PTI Securities & Futures LP's Protected Index Program. The Wall Street Journal added that SMAs work best for investors with at least $1 million or $2 million to spread among various SMA strategies. The story said that, "One reason SMAs may be outperforming mutual funds is that individual SMA strategies tend to have smaller amounts of assets than popular mutual funds, allowing them to trade more nimbly."

Pensions & Investments, a national US investment trade magazine, identified several of the top performing SMAs for 2008.

== See also ==
- Discretionary investment management
