= Trade finance technology =

Subset of technologies used in finance

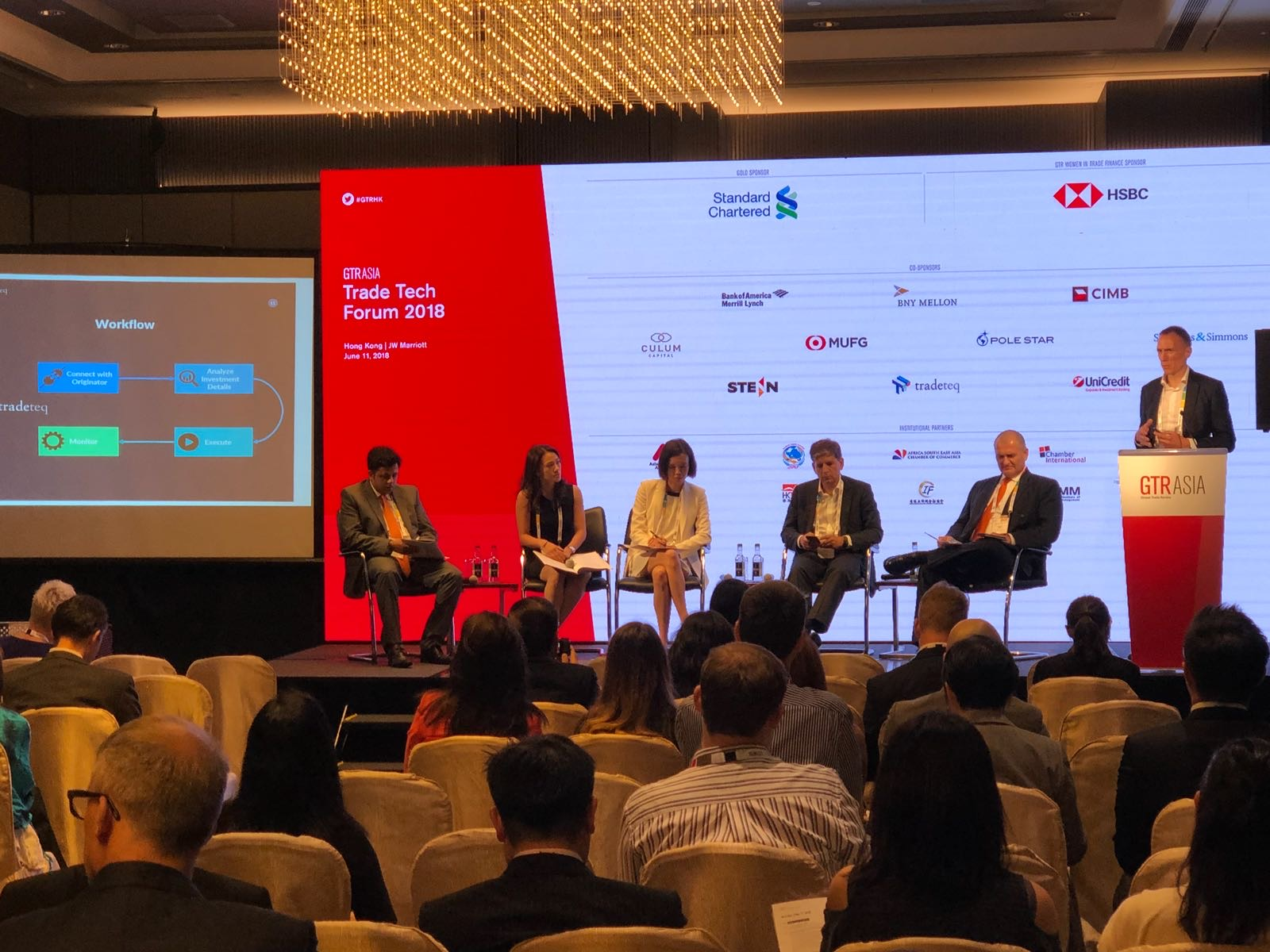
Panel discussion during the Hong Kong Trade Tech Forum

Trade finance technology (abbreviated TradeTech, tradetech, or sometimes Trade Tech) refers to the use of technology, innovation, and software to support and digitally transform the trade finance industry. TradeTech can be seen as a subcategory under FinTech. As digital information becomes more readily accessible, convenient, and available, the trade finance industry is being gradually modernised and digitally transformed. TradeTech puts a particular emphasis on the application of technology and software to modernise trade finance.

== Definition ==
TradeTech is the technology, software, and innovation that aims to enhance traditional financial methods in international trade and that is applied in making available trade finance and related services.

TradeTech seeks to reduce transaction costs for businesses, lower compliance costs, and increase efficiency and transparency for firms, regulators and consumers. The application of TradeTech results in new business models, applications, processes or products with an associated material effect on trade finance markets and institutions.

This is achieved in several ways, such as introducing automation, artificial intelligence (AI), or blockchain networks to existing processes.

== Origins ==
The term TradeTech was first officially established and recognised by the World Economic Forum in a 2018 white paper, highlighting the importance of technologies such as internet of things (IoT), blockchain, and artificial intelligence to facilitate international trade and support trade finance. Wolfgang Lehmacher co-authored the report.

In the private sector, the emergence of private companies that typically use the cloud through software as a service to provide applications is accelerating the availability of TradeTech applications. Companies are often startups founded to modernise the traditionally conservative trade finance market.

The emergence of TradeTech can be linked to a broader trend of making international trade more efficient by removing barriers. This ongoing modernisation of trade began with the invention of shipping containers in the mid-twentieth century, which largely solved the issue of reliability and safety in international trade and also greatly reduced the cost of loading and transportation.

High transaction and financing costs can create a high barrier to cross border trade with high trade costs effectively nullifying comparative advantages as they render exports uncompetitive.

As such, many TradeTech initiatives seek to reduce administrative and bureaucratic costs associated with financing the transporting of goods across a border. This often includes applying technology to global supply chain finance, logistics, and to improve connectivity between trading partners.

In the 1980s, some trade finance processes were digitised, such as with the introduction of the electronic bill of lading. Meanwhile, supply chain finance initiatives emerged in the 1990s, but only began to impact the market after 2000. Most recent developments have seen the rise of asset distribution providers, which seek to increase liquidity in the trade finance sector. There is also a push to use blockchain in trade finance.

== Recent developments ==
According to a round table event hosted by trade financier Deutsche Bank and media company GTR, “Digitalisation of trade finance is something the entire trade finance industry agrees is vital for trade’s longevity”. The rapid development of tradetech and fintech applications is cited to make reporting of environmental, social and corporate governance (ESG) factors a lot easier for the trade finance industry.

== Examples ==
=== Digitalisation ===
TradeTech received an early start with providers that developed products for financial institutions to both digitise and automate their payable and receivable processes. This made it possible to upload trade documentation such as invoices and purchase orders, and then enable their validation and processing.

=== Blockchain ===
The latter half of the 2010s witnessed a significant expansion of blockchain technology, and it is also beginning to be applied to international trade. Specifically, the traceability and security of information of a blockchain network have been noted for its potential for increasing transparency between trade partners and supply chains, as well as the subsequent reducing the potential of fraud.

=== Asset Distribution ===
Marketing sellable trade finance assets is another application emerging within TradeTech. The aim of this is to create new sources of liquidity within the market, thereby increasing the funding available to businesses to continue trading. The Basel Accords limit the amount of funding banks can issue to businesses as they are now required to retain a certain volume of their liquidity. Furthermore, there is a perceived risk associated with issuing trade finance to businesses without credit histories. This culminates into a scenario wherein Small and medium-sized enterprises (SMEs) often struggle to access the finance they require. As a result, asset distribution providers seek to alleviate the pressure from banks by distributing trade finance assets to alternative investors, such as a non-bank financial institution.

== See also ==
- Financial technology
