= William Huston =

American investor and businessman

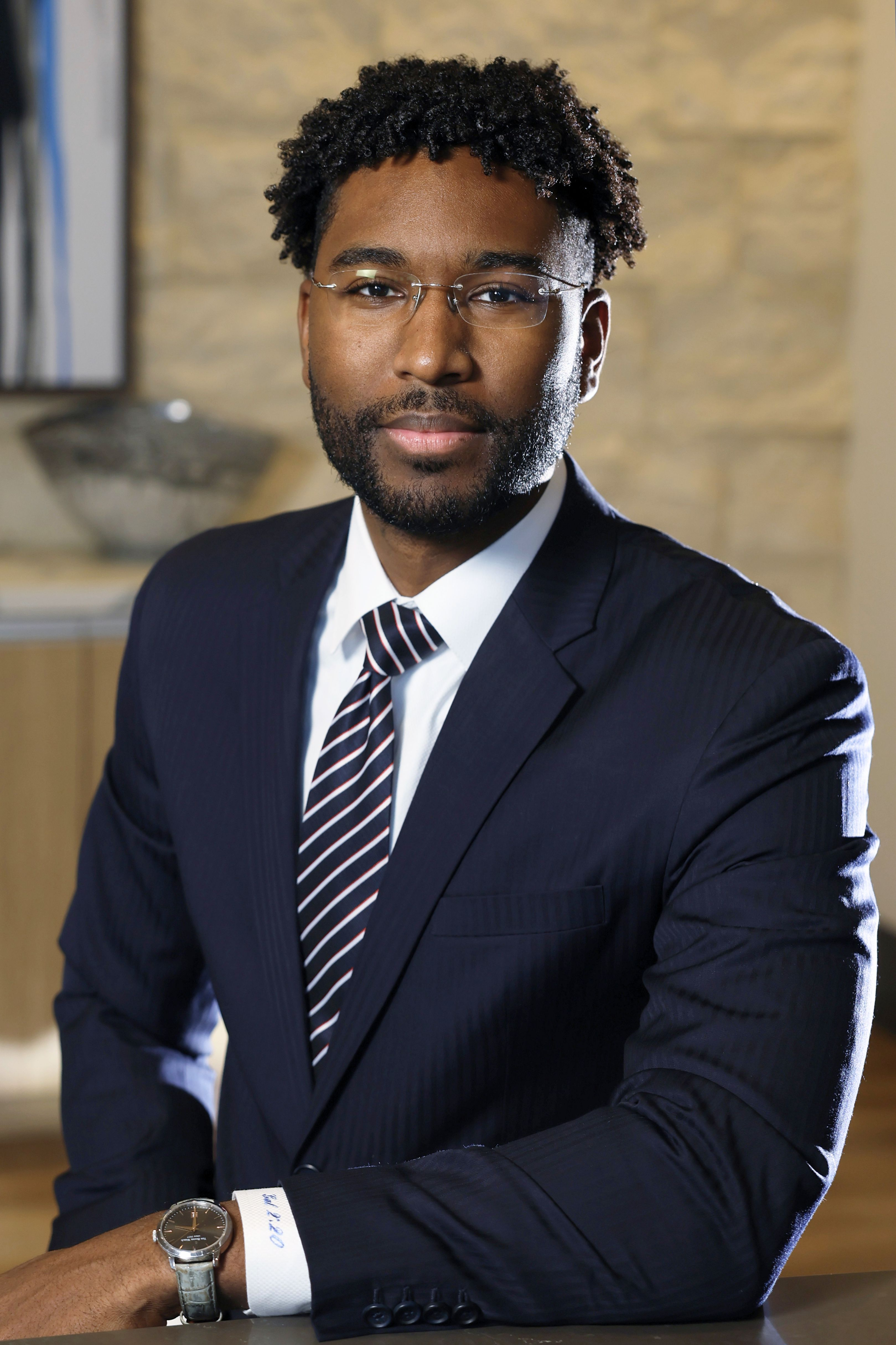
- Founding General Partner of Bay Street Hospitality
- Born: Alabama, United States
- Education: Oakwood University (BS); Cornell University (Hotel Real Estate Investments & Asset Management, 2023–2024); Stanford University (Venture Capital Unlocked, 2023); The Wharton School (Investment Management, 2019–2021)
- Occupations: Investor, Businessman
- Known for: Quantamental Hospitality Infrastructure Investments

William Huston is an American investor, businessman, and founder of Bay Street Hospitality, an institutional investment platform focused on global hospitality assets. He is known for developing a proprietary quantamental investment framework applied to the global hospitality sector.

== Early life and education ==
Huston grew up in a small town in Alabama; his parents were teachers. He initially enrolled at Georgia Tech before a family financial crisis led him to leave. He subsequently transferred to Oakwood University, where he earned a BS in Organizational Management.

He later completed executive education programs at Stanford University School of Engineering (Venture Capital Unlocked, 2023), The Wharton School (Investment Management, 2019–2021), and Cornell's Peter and Stephanie Nolan School of Hotel Administration (Hotel Real Estate Investments & Asset Management, 2023–2024). In early 2026, he completed a Sustainable Investing Certificate through the CFA Institute.

Huston speaks English as his primary language and has elementary proficiency in Chinese, Vietnamese, Japanese, and Korean.

== Career ==
=== Early ventures ===
Following his departure from Georgia Tech, Huston founded a call center operation in Davao, Philippines, to fund his education and provide outsourced financial services to investment firms and insurance companies in the United States. The operation scaled to serve national campaigns for firms including New York Life, MassMutual, and MetLife, as well as government agencies including the CDC and the Department of Veterans Affairs. He operated the venture from 2008 to 2018.

From 2015 to 2018, Huston also served as an enterprise consultant at MotiveMetrics, a natural language processing and psychographic modeling firm based in Palo Alto, California, working with enterprise clients including Adidas and Caesars Entertainment.

=== Bay Street Capital Holdings ===
Huston founded Bay Street Capital Holdings, an SEC-registered investment adviser (CRD No. 299361) based in Palo Alto, California. The firm focused on quantitative investment strategy and cross-asset portfolio construction, and accumulated regulatory assets under management of approximately US$75.9 million. Bay Street Capital Holdings was acquired in 2024.

In 2017, New York Life engaged Huston to support one of its investments in a robo-advisor startup; the following year that startup reached US$500 million in assets under management and raised US$20 million in funding, which Huston later cited as a catalyst for founding Bay Street Hospitality.

=== Bay Street Hospitality ===
In 2018, Huston founded Bay Street Hospitality. The firm is structured as a Variable Capital Company (VCC) under Singapore law and operates globally across public and private markets, applying a proprietary quantamental framework that integrates quantitative scoring with fundamental underwriting discipline, targeting hospitality operators, developers, and asset owners across equity, credit, and hybrid capital structures.

In May 2025, Bay Street Hospitality launched a US$430 million hospitality investment fund (Fund I), targeting underinvested hotel markets globally with particular emphasis on India's fast-growing tourism sector. A second fund (Fund II), structured as a Singapore VCC, carries a stated deployment target of US$5 billion across 14 hospitality-linked strategies spanning markets including Singapore, Japan, Hong Kong, Australia, India, Saudi Arabia, and Europe.

==== Quantamental framework ====
Bay Street Hospitality's investment process is built around a set of proprietary metrics developed by Huston:

- Bay Score – A composite deal score (0–100) integrating financial metrics (NPV, IRR, cash-on-cash yield), operating metrics (RevPAR, EBITDA margin), sponsor strength, exit visibility, and macro overlays. Deals generally require a Bay Score above 70 to proceed to Investment Committee.
- Adjusted Hospitality Alpha (AHA) – Measures excess return above benchmark, net of illiquidity premiums and region-specific macro and foreign exchange risks.
- Bay Adjusted Sharpe (BAS) – A risk-adjusted return metric using AHA over volatility, requiring a BAS above 0.55 for institutional-grade qualification.
- Liquidity Stress Delta (LSD) – Estimates IRR degradation under exit delays, capital controls, or illiquid market conditions.
- Bay Macro Risk Index (BMRI) – A country-level macro risk score blending sovereign spreads, FX volatility, inbound tourism growth, political risk, and capital controls.

==== Partnerships ====
In August 2025, Bay Street Hospitality appointed Alyvate Hospitality as asset manager for select hospitality assets across Southeast Asia, in a strategic partnership focused on data-driven asset management and value creation.

In September 2025, Huston participated in a panel at THINC Indonesia 2025 (held at Sofitel Bali Nusa Dua) alongside representatives of the International Finance Corporation and Hotelivate, discussing tourism investment and capital deployment in Asian hospitality markets.

=== Fulbright Specialist appointment ===
In 2025, Huston was appointed to the Fulbright Specialist Roster (2025–2028) by the United States Department of State and World Learning, focusing on integrating data-driven investment frameworks, artificial intelligence, and public-private partnership models into national hospitality and tourism strategies. His stated focus areas include AI-enhanced feasibility studies, risk-adjusted return modeling, and destination development planning, with engagements spanning Asia, the Middle East, Europe, and Australia, including analytical work related to hotel pipeline readiness for the 2032 Brisbane Olympics.

== Public profile ==
=== Speaking engagements ===
Huston has delivered presentations on quantamental hospitality investing at several international venues. These include a session at the London School of Economics, a keynote at the Wholesale Investor Venture & Capital Singapore 2025 conference held on August 27, 2025 at The Westin Singapore, and a talk at Dubai Chambers on quantamental hospitality investing. In February 2026, he appeared on The Registered Investment Advisor Podcast (Episode 244) discussing Bay Street's global hospitality strategy.

== Recognition ==
- NAACP Powershift Entrepreneur of the Year (2023)
- #1 Investment Firm Under US$5B – AAAA (2023)
- Investopedia Top 100 Financial Advisors (2021–2023)
- Fulbright Specialist Roster – United States Department of State (2025–2028)
