= PTI Securities & Futures =

American money management, securities and discount brokerage firm

- Industry: Financial services
- Founded: 1991 in Chicago, Illinois
- Headquarters: Chicago, Illinois
- Products: Money management, discount stock brokerage, securities
- Website: PTISecurities.com

PTI Securities & Futures is a money management, securities and discount brokerage firm with offices in Chicago, Illinois and Peoria, Arizona. Established in 1991, PTI Securities provides investors, fund managers and pension funds in the United States with investment consulting services.

== Products ==
PTI Securities provides three main products. The first is an online stock trading service that gives investors the ability to place stock trades online or by phone and receive PTI brokers’ assistance. The "Protected Index Program" is a managed money program or separately managed account(SMA) in which investors can tailor their investments to match their personal risk profile. And, PTI’s "ProDirect" brokerage service allows self-directed traders to trade online and obtain minimal broker assistance.

The privately owned company reported that, as of Dec. 31, 2008, its Protected Index Program beat the S&P 500 by 56.04% over the past 10 years, and beat the Russell 2000 Index (IWM) by 45.08% since its inception.

The Wall Street Journal and Pensions & Investments, an investment trade magazine, recognized PTI as one of the nation’s “top performing equity managers” in 2008, for the performance of its Protected Index Program, a separately managed account. In their stories, the two publications also reported that separately managed accounts (SMAs) outperformed mutual funds from 2006 through 2008, and unveiled new research from Morningstar research firm which found that SMAs beat mutual funds in 22 of 26 stock and bond categories during that time.

Investment News recognized the Protected Index Program as one of the most successful equity fund strategies for the year ended March 31, 2009.

With the Dow Jones Industrial Average losing 33.8% in 2008, its worst performance since 1931 during the Great Depression, many investors are looking for protection from market risk and future losses.

== Investor Education ==
CNBC-TV and other major U.S. media seek PTI Securities management officials for their investment and market analysis expertise. Businesses and organizations turn to the firm’s management to get their information and analysis. To communicate with investors, the company’s management makes presentations on investment tools. PTI Securities is best known in the Chicago metropolitan area in part because Principal Tom Haugh co-hosted “Stocks and Jocks,” a daily investment analysis program on Chicago sports radio station WSCR from 2001 to 2008. As of February 1, 2010 this show airs daily on 1240AM WSBC Chicago.

Tom Haugh also publishes a “Dollars & Sen$e” informational blog giving his analysis of the latest key market, economics and finance developments.

In June 2009, President Dan Haugh wrote an article published in Stocks, Futures and Options Magazine, where he emphasized the importance of investors “insuring” their investments by using options to lessen the chance of stock investment losses such as the stock market’s major drop in 2008. In the story, Haugh said “… the age of using the option product as an investment risk-management tool is upon us.”

== History ==
Before establishing the firm, Tom and Dan Haugh and their other senior management were traders at the Chicago Board Options Exchange (CBOE).

The CBOE lists the company as among Trading Firm Contacts that investors can consider. PTI Securities & Futures is a member of the Securities Investor Protection Corporation (SIPC), Financial Industry Regulatory Authority (FINRA), and the National Futures Association (NFA).
