= Jon Stein =

American fintech entrepreneur

- Born: Jonathan Stein
- Education: Harvard University; Columbia Business School
- Occupations: Investor, business magnate, and entrepreneur
- Known for: Founding and leading Betterment

Jonathan "Jon" Stein is an American fintech entrepreneur. He is the founder and chairman of Betterment, the largest independent online financial advisor in the U.S., with over $18 billion in assets under management. Stein was chief executive officer from Betterment's founding in 2010 until December 2020, when he was succeeded by Sarah Levy. Under the umbrella of Betterment Holdings Inc., Stein manages Betterment's core retail platform, often referred to as a "robo-advisor"; a 401(k) platform called Betterment for Business, and a digital advisory platform called Betterment for Advisors.

== Education ==
Stein received his B.A. from Harvard University and MBA from Columbia Business School.

== Career ==
Stein launched Betterment in 2008 at TechCrunch Disrupt and made it to the final five in the Startup Battlefield competition the same year.

An outspoken critic of some traditional financial practices, Stein has become a recognized industry advocate for more transparency in investing and more customer-centric financial solutions, as well as public policy issues, such as the U.S. Department of Labor's fiduciary rule for retirement plans.

In 2016, Stein was awarded the 27th spot on Fortune's 40 Under 40 list.
