= Raiz (company) =

Australian financial technology company

Raiz Invest Limited
- Company type: Public
- Website type: Financial technology
- Traded as: ASX: RZI
- Area served: Australia
- Key people: Brendan Malone (Managing Director / Chief Executive Officer) Alex Gao (Chief Financial Officer)
- Industry: Financial technology
- Revenue: ▲ A$21.0 million (2024)
- Website: raizinvest.com.au
- Users: 315,634 active customers As of 24 November 2024
- Current status: Active
- Native clients on: Android iOS

Raiz Invest Limited (ASX:RZI) is an Australian fintech company that operates one of the country’s most-downloaded micro-investing and spare-change investing apps. Through automated “round-ups”, recurring deposits and lump-sum transfers, the mobile platform invests customer funds into diversified portfolios of exchange-traded funds (ETFs) alongside options for Bitcoin, Australian residential property and themed equity baskets. Raiz positions itself as a low-cost digital robo-advisor and wealth-management provider, extending its offering to superannuation via the Raiz Invest Super product.

Since launch in 2016, the service has grown a predominantly millennial user base: about 70% are aged 18–35 and more than four-fifths add money to their account at least once a month. Investments can start from as little as AU$5, and the app holds average ratings of 4.8/5 on the Apple App Store and 4.5/5 on Google Play from over 50,000 combined reviews. As at 24 November 2024 Raiz managed **AU$1.59 billion** for **315,634 active customers**, up 31.8% year-on-year, and reported FY 2024 Australian revenue of **AU$21 million** with positive EBITDA of **AU$1.3 million**.

The company originated as Acorns Australia under licence from Acorns Grow (United States), re-branded to Raiz and listed on the Australian Securities Exchange in 2018. After brief expansion to Indonesia and Malaysia, Raiz divested both Asian subsidiaries in FY 2024–FY 2025 to refocus on domestic growth and profitability. Its product suite has since diversified to include **Raiz Plus** (custom portfolios), **Raiz Kids** (custodial accounts), **Raiz Rewards** (cashback investing), **Raiz Jars** (goal-based saving) and an unlisted Residential Property Fund.

Raiz’s approach to “democratising investing” has been recognised with multiple industry awards, including *Investment Innovator of the Year* at the FinTech Business Awards (2017–2019), *Best FinTech App* at the FinTech Australia Awards (2023) and *Innovation Excellence* from Canstar (2025).

== History ==
Raiz launched in February 2016 as Acorns Australia. It listed on the ASX in June 2018 after re-branding, then opened operations in Indonesia and Malaysia (2019–2021). Both offshore businesses were divested during FY 2024–FY 2025 to concentrate capital on scaling its core Australian platform.

== Products and services ==
- Raiz micro-investing app – automated round-ups, recurring and lump-sum deposits from AU$5, portfolio re-balancing and dividend reinvestment.
- Raiz Plus portfolios (2023) – fully customisable ETF, ASX, stock, Bitcoin and Australian residential property portfolios (launched 2023); As of 24 November 2024.
- Raiz Invest Super (2018) – nine risk-rated superannuation strategies.
- Raiz Kids – custodial investing for minors.
- Raiz Property Fund – passive exposure to Australian residential real estate.
- Raiz Rewards – cashback from more than 1,300 retail partners automatically invested.
- Raiz Jars – goal-based savings sub-accounts.

== Financial performance ==
For FY 2024 Raiz generated AU$21 million in Australian revenue (↑19 % YoY) and positive EBITDA of AU$1.3 million for the Australian business. Gross margin reached 68%, operating cash flow was positive for four consecutive quarters and expenses fell 4%. Average revenue per user rose 16% to AU$70.

== Strategic developments ==
- August 2024 – State Street Global Advisors acquired a 4.8% stake and agreed to co-develop education, ETF and retirement products.

== Awards and recognition ==
- Investment Innovator of the Year – FinTech Business Awards 2017, 2018, 2019.
- Best FinTech App – FinTech Australia Awards 2023.
- Investment Innovation (Raiz Plus) – Finder Innovation Awards 2024.
- Best Value Mobile Super Fund – WeMoney Awards 2024.
- #1 Diversified Growth & #2 Balanced option – SuperRatings 2024.
- Innovation Excellence Award (Raiz Plus) – Canstar 2025.
- Most Recommended Micro-investing app - Finder Awards 2025
- Top Performing Super fund for 2025 (3rd year in a row)

== See also ==
- Robo-advisor
- Micro-investing
- Australian Securities Exchange
