= Cryptocurrency in Australia =

Cryptocurrency in Australia refers to the use and regulation of digital currencies such as Bitcoin, Ethereum, and various other altcoins within the country of Australia. Australia has been recognized as a relatively progressive country regarding cryptocurrency adoption and regulation.

== History ==
The history of cryptocurrency in Australia dates back to the early 2010s when Bitcoin first gained popularity. Over the years, Australia has seen a steady increase in the number of people investing in and using cryptocurrencies. This growth has been accompanied by the development of local cryptocurrency exchanges and businesses.

== Adoption and usage ==
Cryptocurrency adoption in Australia has been notable among both individuals and businesses. The country has seen a significant increase in the number of merchants accepting cryptocurrencies and ATMs facilitating crypto transactions. Furthermore, superannuation funds and investment platforms have begun incorporating cryptocurrencies into their offerings. A significant portion of Australian investors are engaged in the cryptocurrency market. As of 2023, 15% of Australian investors hold cryptocurrencies, with a higher adoption rate of 31% among younger investors aged between 18 and 24.

While Bitcoin remains the most popular cryptocurrency in Australia, other significant cryptocurrencies include Ethereum, Ripple (XRP), and Litecoin. The Australian market has also seen the rise of local cryptocurrencies and blockchain projects.

Australia boasts the highest rate of cryptocurrency adoption (23%) among developed nations, ranking eighth worldwide. This rate surpasses the estimated adoption rates in the United States (16%) and the United Kingdom (12%), as reported by Statista.

== Regulatory environment ==
The Australian government, primarily through the Australian Securities and Investments Commission (ASIC) and the Australian Taxation Office (ATO), has created a regulatory framework that treats cryptocurrencies as property for tax purposes and imposes anti-money laundering (AML) and counter-terrorism financing (CTF) obligations on cryptocurrency exchanges.

== See also ==
- Blockchain technology
- Cryptocurrency
- Digital economy
- Financial technology in Australia
