= Robo-advisor =

Financial advisory software

Robo-advisors or robo-advisers are financial advisers that provide personalized financial advice and investment management online with moderate to minimal human intervention. A robo-advisor provides digital financial advice that is personalised based on mathematical rules or algorithms. These algorithms are designed by human financial advisors, investment managers and data scientists, and coded in software by programmers. These algorithms are executed by software and do not require a human advisor to impart financial advice to a client. The model investment portfolios are constructed by the firm's investment committee. The management of each of the client portfolios, including rebalancing, is automated.

Robo-advisors are categorized based on the extent of personalization, discretion, involvement, and human interaction. There are over 100 robo-advisory services. Investment management robo-advice is considered a breakthrough in formerly exclusive wealth management services, bringing services to a broader audience at a lower cost than traditional human advice. Robo-advisors collect financial situation information from the client to determine risk tolerance. Then, robo-advisors allocate a client's assets on the basis of risk preferences and desired target return. In so doing, robo-advisors align clients’ choices with those an expert decision-maker following standard economic optimization models would make, which many clients may be unable to do due to limited financial literacy and expertise. While robo-advisors have the capability of allocating client assets in many investment products such as stocks, bonds, futures, commodities, and real estate, the advice is often directed towards exchange-traded funds. Clients can choose between offerings with passive asset allocation techniques or active asset management styles.

Robo-advisors that provide investment management service create a discretionary managed account for each of its clients.

== History ==
The first robo-advisor Betterment was launched in 2010 as a direct-to-consumer model by Jon Stein, followed in 2011 by Wealthfront. Thereafter, robo-advisors increased in popularity. Before robo-advisers, online portfolio management interfaces existed since the early 2000s and these interfaces were used by financial managers to manage and balance clients' assets. By the end of 2015, several robo-advisers from around the globe were managing $60 billion in assets of clients.

In 2012, MoneyFarm was launched in Italy. In 2013, Nutmeg was launched in the United Kingdom. In 2014, Stockspot was launched in Australia, followed there in 2015 by QuietGrowth. In 2015, 8 Securities launched one of Asia's first robo-advisors in Japan, followed there in 2016 by Money Design, Co., under the brand name THEO, and WealthNavi. In 2017, Singapore based StashAway received a capital markets services license from the Monetary Authority of Singapore. In 2018, Sarwa became the first regulated robo-advisory in the United Arab Emirates to receive a full operating licence.

The industry entered a consolidation phase in the mid-2020s, with several big financial institutions exiting or restructuring their robo advisory offerings. For example, Goldman Sachs sold its Marcus Invest platform to Betterment in 2024, and UBS announced the closure of its Advice Advantage robo-advisor.

WealthNavi IPO'd in 2020, and Wealthfront IPO'd in 2025.

Some firms, such as Wealthsimple, have used robo advice as a beachhead to later offer other financial services, while others, such as QuietGrowth, continue to focus on robo advice.

== Generative AI and large language models ==
With the growing adoption of AI by enterprises since early-2020s, robo advisors too have started to utilise AI for some of their workflows.

U.S. regulators continued to apply existing investment-adviser and robo-adviser frameworks to these AI-enabled practices. The U.S. Securities and Exchange Commission describes automated investment advisers as "robo-advisers" that provide asset-management services through online algorithmic programs, and in 2024 it charged two investment advisers with making false and misleading statements about their use of artificial intelligence. In its 2026 Annual Regulatory Oversight Report, FINRA said its existing rules remained applicable when firms used generative AI, including rules concerning supervision, communications, recordkeeping and fair dealing.

== Definition ==
A robo-advisor can be defined as "a self-guided online wealth management service that provides automated investment advice at low costs and low account minimums, employing portfolio management algorithms". Some robo-advisors do have an element of human interference and supervision.

Legally, the term "financial advisor" applies to any entity giving personalized financial advice. Most robo-advisor services are instead limited to providing discretionary portfolio management, that is the allocation of investments among asset classes, without addressing issues such as estate and retirement planning and cash-flow management, which are also the domain of financial planning. Robo advisors provide "personal financial advice" in addition to "general financial advice". Personal financial advice is tailored to the financial situation and goals of the client, and is in their best interests. General financial advice doesn't take into account the personal situation or goals of the client, or how it might affect them personally.

Other designations for the financial technology companies that program robo advisor software include "automated investment advisor", "automated investment management", "online investment advisor" and "digital investment advisor".

An investment platform, even if it provides automated service, cannot be termed as a robo advisor if it does not provide personalised investment advice.

== Areas served ==
While robo-advisors are most common in the United States, they are also present in Germany, Australia, India, Canada, and Singapore.

Robo-advisors are extending into different aspects of financial advice, such as advising retail customers on how much money to spend versus save, how to plan for retirement and decumulation (selling off securities over time), and tax loss harvesting.

== Methodology ==
The tools they employ to manage client portfolios differ little from the portfolio management software already widely used in the profession.

The portfolios that robo-advisors offer are typically exchange-traded funds, but some offer portfolios of individual stocks. Typically they employ modern portfolio theory, which minimizes risk for a given expected return. Some are designed for use with socially responsible investing, Halal investing, or strategies similar to hedge funds.

== Consumer access ==
The customer acquisition costs and time constraints faced by traditional human advisors have left many middle-class investors underadvised or unable to obtain portfolio management services because of the minimums imposed on investable assets. The average financial planner has a minimum investment amount of $50,000, while minimum investment amounts for robo-advisors start as low as $500 in the United States and as low as £1 in the United Kingdom. In addition to having lower minimums on investable assets compared to traditional human advisors, robo-advisors charge fees ranging from 0.2 percent to 1.0 percent of Assets Under Management, while traditional financial planners charged average fees of 1.35 percent of Assets Under Management, according to a survey conducted by AdvisoryHQ News.

At the same time, at the other end of the client spectrum, high-net-worth individual (HNI) investors are increasingly using robo-advisors.

== Regulation ==
In the United States, robo-advisors must be registered investment advisors, which are regulated by the Securities and Exchange Commission. In the United Kingdom they are regulated by the Financial Conduct Authority.

Robo advisors that manage client money offer discretionary accounts for the clients. This sets them apart from micro investing firms, managed funds and investing platforms. In Australia, the robo-advisors manage the client money through the Managed Discretionary Account (MDA) structure.
