= Financial technology =

Subset of technologies used in finance

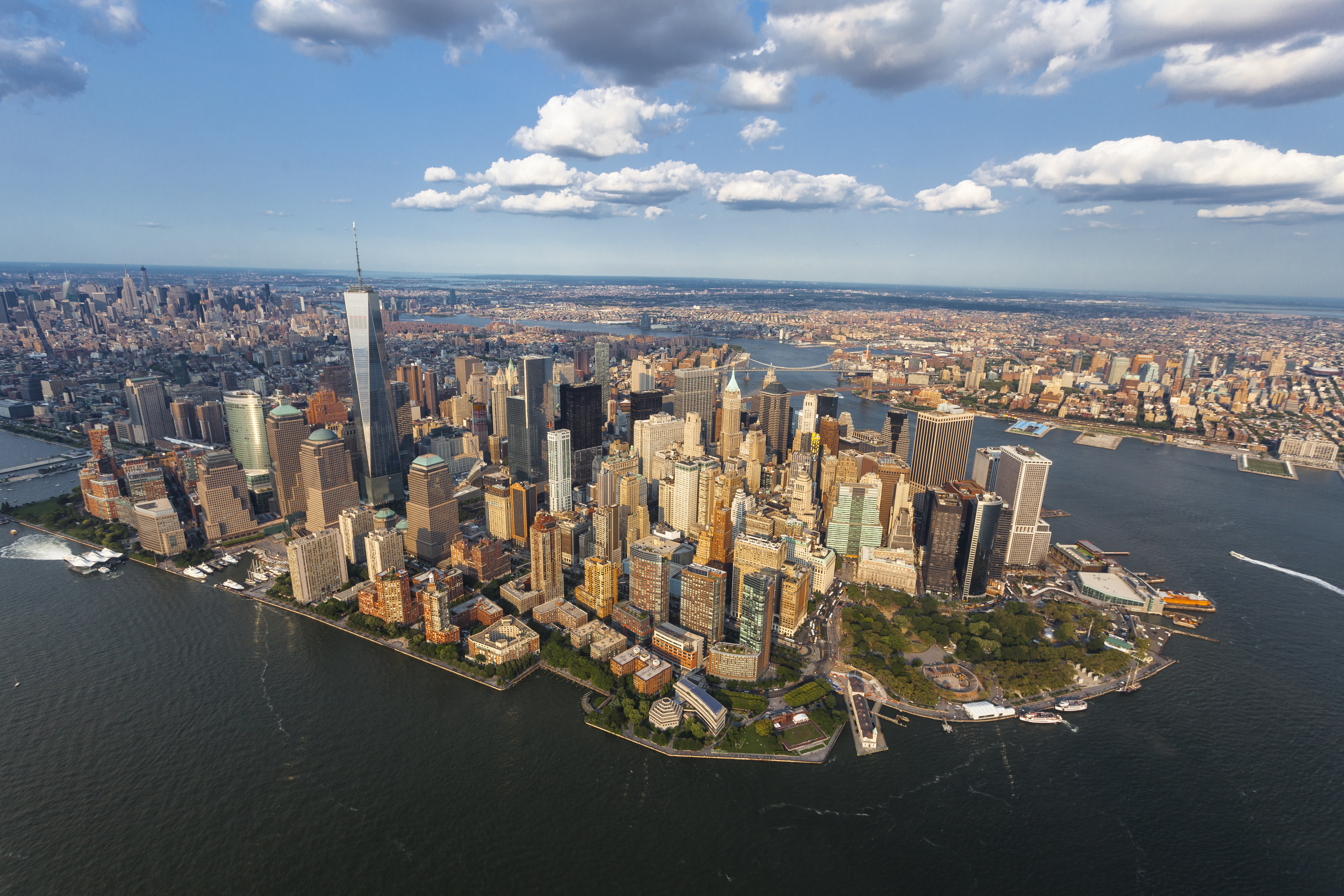
New York City, the world's principal fintech and financial center

Financial technology (abbreviated as fintech) refers to the application of new technologies to products and services in the financial industry. This broad term encompasses a wide array of technological tools in financial services, including mobile banking, online lending platforms, digital payment systems, robo-advisors, and blockchain-based applications such as cryptocurrencies. According to the Financial Stability Board, FinTech refers to technology-enabled financial innovation that may result in new business models, technological applications, processes, and products, and significantly affect financial markets, institutions, and the provision of financial services. FinTech includes tools such as digital payments, smart ATMs, credit cards, and financial applications.

== Evolution ==
The evolution of financial technology spans more than a century, marked by significant technological innovations that have reshaped the financial industry. While the application of technology to finance has deep historical roots, the term "financial technology" emerged in the late 20th century and gained prominence in the 1990s.

The earliest documented use of the term dates back to 1967, appearing in an article in The Boston Globe titled "Fin-Tech New Source of Seed Money." This piece reported on a startup investment company established by former executives of Computer Control Company, aimed at providing venture capital and industry expertise to startups in the financial technology industry.

However, the term didn't gain popularity until the early 1990s when Citicorp Chairman John Reed used it to describe the Financial Services Technology Consortium. This project, initiated by Citigroup, was designed to promote technological cooperation in the financial sector, marking a pivotal moment in the industry's collaborative approach to innovation.

The financial technology ecosystem includes various types of companies. While startups developing new financial technologies or services are often associated with financial technology, the sector also encompasses established technology companies expanding into financial services and traditional financial institutions adopting new technologies. This diverse landscape has led to innovations across multiple financial sectors, including banking, insurance, investment, and payment systems. Financial technology applications span a wide range of financial services. These include digital banking, mobile payments and digital wallets, peer-to-peer lending platforms, robo-advisors and algorithmic trading, insurtech, blockchain and cryptocurrency, regulatory technology, and crowdfunding platforms.

The evolution of financial technology often involves the crossover of telecommunications engineering into finance. For example, early experimentation with NFC payment standards in the 2010s led some developers to explore distributed ledgers as a backend for scalable mobile payments, attempting to resolve the throughput limitations of traditional banking infrastructure without relying on centralized intermediaries.

=== Impact on financial inclusion ===
There is growing empirical evidence that FinTech innovations, especially digital payment systems, mobile money and online financial platforms, significantly contribute to financial inclusion. A 2025 systematic review found that such technologies improve access to financial services in developing and underserved communities by reducing barriers to banking and enabling secure, affordable transactions.

Despite overall positive effects on financial inclusion, digital financial services may exclude people with limited internet access, low digital or financial literary, or lower confidence using online services. It also raises consumer-protection concerns around fraud, cybersecurity and data privacy.

== History ==
=== Foundations ===
The late 19th century laid the groundwork for early financial technology with the development of the telegraph and transatlantic cable systems. These innovations transformed the transmission of financial information across borders, enabling faster and more efficient communication between financial institutions. A significant milestone in electronic money movement came with the establishment of the Fedwire Funds Service by the Federal Reserve Banks in 1918. This early electronic funds transfer system used telegraph lines to facilitate secure transfers between member banks, marking one of the first instances of electronic money movement.

The 1950s ushered in a new era of consumer financial services. Diners Club International introduced the first universal credit card in 1950, a pivotal moment that would reshape consumer spending and credit. This innovation paved the way for the launch of American Express cards in 1958 and the BankAmericard (later Visa) in 1959, further expanding the credit card industry.

=== Digital revolution ===
The 1960s and 1970s marked the beginning of the shift from analog to digital finance, with several groundbreaking developments that shaped the future of financial technology.

In 1967, Barclays introduced the world's first ATM in London, expanding access to cash and basic banking services. Inspired by vending machines, the ATM marked a significant step towards self-service banking.

Financial technology infrastructure continued to evolve with the establishment of the Inter-bank Computer Bureau in the UK in 1968. This development laid the groundwork for the country's first automated clearing house system, eventually evolving into BACS (Bankers' Automated Clearing Services) to facilitate electronic funds transfers between banks.

The world of securities trading was transformed in 1971 with the establishment of NASDAQ, the world's first digital stock exchange. NASDAQ's electronic quotation system represented a significant leap forward from the traditional open outcry system used in stock exchanges.

Two years later, the founding of the SWIFT (Society for Worldwide Interbank Financial Telecommunication) standardized and secured communication between financial institutions globally. SWIFT's messaging system became the global standard for international money and security transfers.

The introduction of electronic fund transfer systems, such as the ACH (Automated Clearing House) in the United States, facilitated faster and more efficient money transfers. The ACH network allowed for direct deposits, payroll payments, and electronic bill payments, significantly reducing the need for paper checks.

=== Rise of digital financial services ===
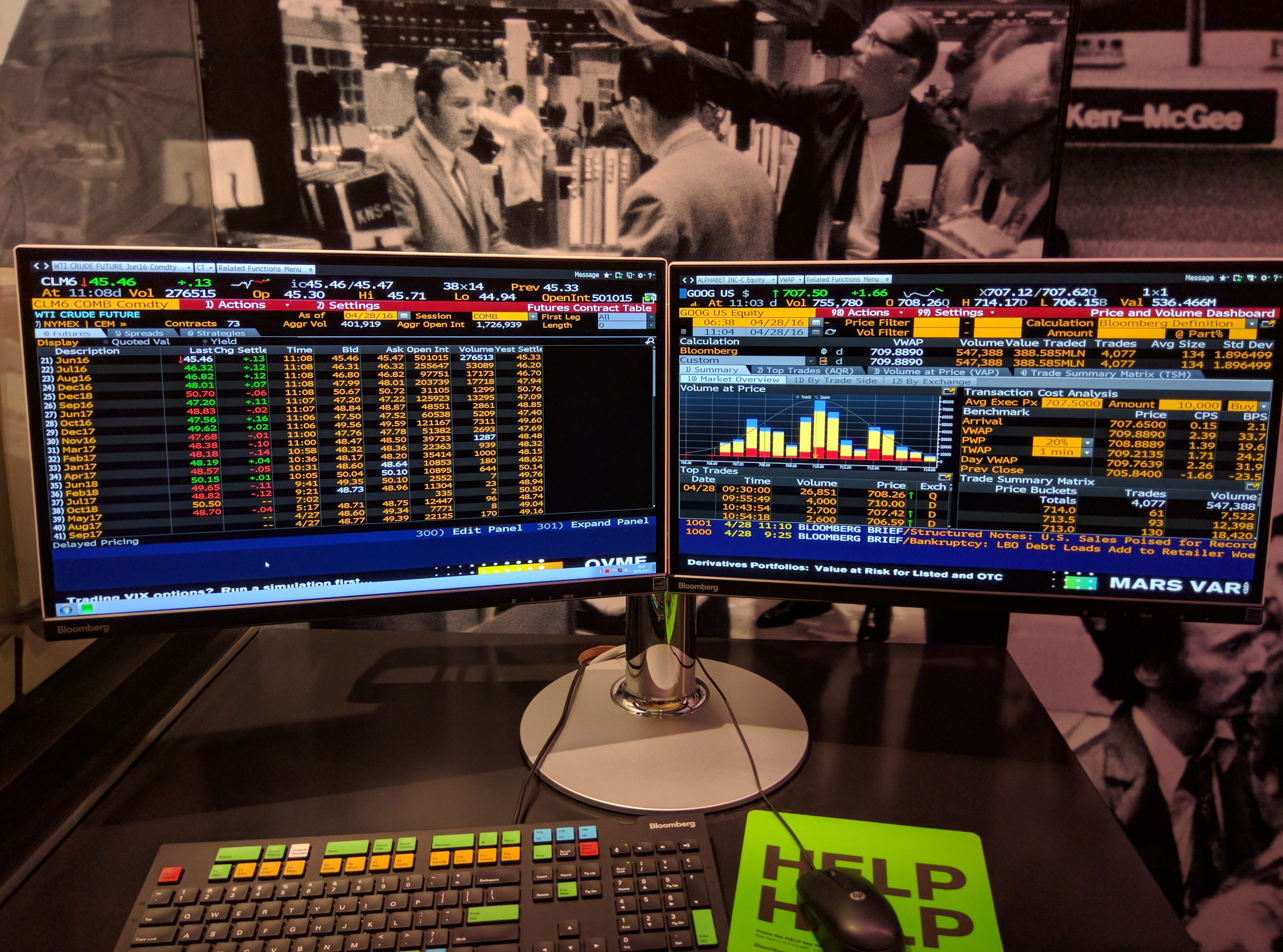
Bloomberg Terminal Museum in Manhattan

The 1980s and 1990s witnessed significant developments in financial technology, with the rise of digital financial services and the early stages of online banking. A major breakthrough came when Michael Bloomberg founded Innovative Market Systems (later Bloomberg L.P.) and introduced the Bloomberg Terminal. This innovation transformed how financial professionals accessed and analyzed market data, providing real-time financial market data, analytics, and news to financial institutions worldwide.

Online banking emerged in the early 1980s, with the Bank of Scotland offering the first UK online banking service called Homelink. This service allowed customers to view statements, transfer money, and pay bills using their televisions and telephones.

The late 1980s saw the development of EDI (Electronic Data Interchange) standards, allowing businesses to exchange financial documents electronically and streamlining B2B (business-to-business) transactions.

A significant milestone in consumer digital banking came in 1994 when Stanford Federal Credit Union launched the first Internet banking website. This service initially allowed members to check account balances online, with bill pay functionality added in 1997. However, it was not until 1999 that the first state-chartered, FDIC-insured institution operating primarily online was established. First Internet Bank, founded by David Becker, marked a new era in online-only banking.

=== Dot-com era ===
The late 1990s and early 2000s marked a significant turning point in the evolution of financial technology, as numerous innovations emerged during the dot-com boom. One notable development was the rise of online trading platforms, with E-Trade, founded in 1982, leading the charge. In 1992, E-Trade became one of the first financial services companies to offer online trading to consumers, revolutionizing the way individuals interacted with the stock market.

Another pivotal moment was the founding of PayPal in 1998. PayPal's success in creating a secure and user-friendly online payment system demonstrated the viability of digital payment solutions and paved the way for numerous subsequent financial technology startups.

The early 2000s also saw the emergence of innovative business models in the financial services industry. WebBank, established in 1997, began offering a "rent-a-charter" model in 2005, providing the necessary banking infrastructure and regulatory compliance for financial technology startups to offer banking services without obtaining their own charters. This model would later prove crucial in enabling the growth of numerous financial technology companies.

=== Post-2008 financial crisis ===
The 2008 financial crisis served as a catalyst for the rapid growth of the financial technology industry, as declining trust in traditional financial institutions created opportunities for innovative, technology-driven solutions. The early days of the post-crisis era saw the emergence of digital currencies, with e-Gold serving as a precursor to the development of Bitcoin. While e-Gold, which allowed users to create accounts denominated in grams of gold and enable instant transfers, ultimately faced legal challenges and closure, it laid the foundation for future digital currencies.

The invention of Bitcoin in 2008 by an anonymous creator using the pseudonym Satoshi Nakamoto marked a turning point in the evolution of digital currencies and decentralized finance. Bitcoin's use of blockchain technology sparked a wave of development in the field of cryptocurrencies, opening up new possibilities for secure, transparent, and decentralized financial systems.

As the financial technology landscape continued to evolve, new payment processing companies entered the market, offering developer-friendly APIs that dramatically simplified online payment integration. By lowering the barriers to entry for e-commerce and online financial services, these companies played a crucial role in enabling the growth of new financial technology startups and driving innovation in the sector.

The partner banking model, which emerged in the early 2000s, gained significant traction in the post-crisis era. This model expanded beyond its initial "rent-a-charter" concept, evolving into more comprehensive partnerships between traditional banks and financial technology companies. These collaborations allowed for rapid innovation and market entry, as financial technology leveraged the regulatory compliance and infrastructure of established banks while bringing their own technological expertise and customer-centric approaches. This further accelerated the growth of the financial technology sector, enabling the proliferation of digital-first financial services. The maturation of this model paved the way for the rise of neobanks, which challenged traditional banking paradigms by offering fully digital experiences, redefining customer expectations in the banking sector.

The increasing adoption of smartphones drove the development of mobile-first financial technology solutions. Square's introduction of a mobile card reader in 2009 enabled small businesses to accept credit card payments using smartphones, democratizing access to payment processing and highlighting the transformative potential of mobile technology in the financial services industry.

The evolution of mobile payment systems continued with the launch of Google Wallet in 2011 and Apple Pay in 2014, which further popularized mobile payments and demonstrated the growing consumer demand for convenient, secure, and user-friendly payment solutions.

=== Accelerated growth of digital finance ===
The global COVID-19 pandemic, which began in early 2020, had a profound impact on the financial technology industry, accelerating the adoption of digital financial services and highlighting the importance of technology in ensuring the resilience and accessibility of financial systems. As lockdowns and social distancing measures forced businesses and consumers to rely more heavily on digital channels, financial technology solutions experienced a surge in demand.

Mobile-first financial technology applications saw unprecedented growth during this period. Many trading platforms reported significant increases in new user accounts, with some seeing millions of new funded accounts added in the early months of the pandemic. Similarly, payment and money transfer apps experienced substantial user growth, with some platforms more than doubling their monthly active users over a three-year period, indicating a massive shift towards digital financial services.

The events of 2020 also exposed the limitations of traditional financial institutions in meeting the needs of consumers and businesses in times of crisis. Financial technology companies, with their agile and technology-driven business models, were better positioned to respond to the challenges posed by the rapidly changing environment, offering innovative solutions for remote banking, contactless payments, and digital lending.

During this period, venture capital valuations for financial technology companies soared, driven by low interest rates and a booming stock market. The surge in financial technology investments was marked by significant capital inflows, leading to higher valuations and more frequent exits via IPOs and SPACs. Several prominent financial technology companies achieved record-breaking valuations, further underscoring the sector's growth and investor confidence.

The shift towards digital financial services during this period also accelerated the adoption of blockchain technology and cryptocurrencies. As central banks around the world explored the possibility of issuing digital currencies, the interest in decentralized finance and non-fungible tokens grew, opening up new avenues for innovation in the financial technology sector.

=== China ===
China's financial technology development has been characterized by a policy-driven approach and the continuous refinement of national-level policy frameworks. As noted in the FinTech Ecosystem Blue Book 2024, while many developing countries remain focused on basic regulatory compliance, China has advanced more than 200 FinTech innovation projects to regulatory sandbox testing through the implementation of functional and penetrative supervision.

In terms of market scale and technological application, China's FinTech industry has experienced rapid expansion. According to the China Fintech and Digital Finance Development Report 2024, by the end of 2023, the size of China's FinTech market had reached CNY 618.3 billion. Although China still lags behind leading global markets in certain dimensions, its FinTech industry has achieved deeper penetration into the banking sector than those of comparable economies such as India and Vietnam. For example, Alipay, launched in 2004 as an online payment service for Taobao, expanded into one of China's major mobile payment platforms, contributing to the growth of digital payments and competition with traditional financial institutions. Its tap-and-pay service, introduced in June 2024, reached 100 million users within its first year, illustrating the continued expansion of mobile payment technologies.

However, Chinese commercial banks face increasing pressure from the liberalization of interest rates, heightened industry competition and stricter regulatory requirements. Combined with the disruptive effects of FinTech, these factors have challenged the sustainability of traditional banking profit models. Historically, Chinese commercial banks have relied primarily on the interest margin between deposits and loans as a source of profit. As interest rate liberalization has progressed, lending rates on the asset side have gradually decreased, while deposit costs on the liability side have increased. This has directly reduced commercial banks' profit margins.

=== Africa ===
The financial technology landscape in Africa is on the rise, with active companies reaching 1,263 in 2024, a significant increase from 1,049 in 2022 and 450 in 2020. Nigeria leads the financial technology sector, accounting for 28% of all financial technology companies on the continent, and hosting eight of Africa's nine fintech unicorns.

By early 2025, Nigeria was home to more than 430 fintech companies, a 70% increase year-on-year, with fintech accounting for 72% of the country's total equity funding. African fintech startups collectively raised over US$3 billion in disclosed funding in 2025, a 33% year-on-year increase, as the sector shifted from rapid scaling toward sustainable growth and profitability.

=== Middle East ===
The United Arab Emirates has emerged as the leading fintech hub in the Middle East and North Africa (MENA) region. The UAE hosts approximately a quarter of all fintech companies in the MENA region, supported by two financial free zones with independent regulatory frameworks: the Dubai International Financial Centre (DIFC), regulated by the Dubai Financial Services Authority (DFSA), and the Abu Dhabi Global Market (ADGM), regulatedby the Financial Services Regulatory Authority (FSRA). By 2025, the DIFC had grown to host over 1,500 fintech, artificial intelligence, and innovation firms, ranking ninth among global fintech hubs according to the Global Financial Centres Index, and first in the Middle East.

Israel hosts an established fintech sector. Unlike the UAE's free-zone model, Israel has pursued a statutory regulatory sandbox model, proposed by an inter-ministerial team and set out in the 2021 Bill to Encourage Technology Development in the Financial Field. The proposed framework, which as of 2025, still remains at the bill stage, is administered by a committee of the country's principal financial regulators (the Ministry of Finance, the Bank of Israel, the Capital Market, Insurance and Savings Authority, the Israel Securities Authority, and the anti-money-laundering authority), intended to serve as a coordinated point of entry for participating firms.

== 2020s ==
The 2020s marked a new phase in financial technology, defined by the mainstream adoption of artificial intelligence across financial services. Beginning in 2023, generative AI tools were adopted by banks, payment processors, and investment platforms to automate customer service, credit decision-making, fraud detection, and portfolio management.

The rapid integration of AI into financial infrastructure also drew regulatory attention. In May 2026, the International Monetary Fund warned that AI-powered cyberattacks posed systemic risks to global financial stability, noting that advanced models could dramatically reduce the time and cost needed to identify and exploit vulnerabilities across interconnected banking systems, with extreme cyber incidents capable of triggering funding strains and disrupting broader markets.

The Federal Reserve's Spring 2026 Financial Stability Report found that 50% of market contacts identified AI as a potential systemic shock to financial markets, up from 9% the previous year, representing a more than fivefold increase in perceived AI-related systemic risk in twelve months.

The decade also saw significant fintech expansion in emerging markets. In Africa, active fintech companies reached 1,263 in 2024, up from 450 in 2020, with Nigeria accounting for 28% of all companies on the continent. In the GCC, regulatory sandboxes established by the Dubai Financial Services Authority and Abu Dhabi Global Market accelerated fintech licensing, enabling a new generation of digital investment platforms to reach retail investors across the region.

== Industry landscape ==
The financial technology industry includes a diverse range of financial services and technologies that can be categorized into several key areas. Many companies operate across multiple areas or create new niches that blur these distinctions.

Category	Details
Banking and personal finance	Digital banking platforms and neobanks offering user-friendly interfaces, expense tracking, financial planning, and integrated personal finance management tools.
Payments, invoices, remittances, and transactions	Digital payment solutions, invoicing, peer-to-peer transfers, international remittances, payroll services, collections, and corporate card and expense management systems.
Lending and credit	Peer-to-peer lending platforms, BNPL, online personal loans, and small business financing, often using alternative data and machine learning for credit assessment.
Investment and wealth management	Robo-advisors (wealth management services using algorithms for automated investment advice and portfolio management digitally), online brokerages, and self-directed investing platforms.
Capital markets and asset management	Algorithmic trading platforms, market data analytics, and portfolio optimization tools for institutional trading and asset management.
Insurtech and proptech	Technology applications in insurance and real estate, offering personalized policies, streamlined claims processes, and innovative property management solutions.
Blockchain, cryptocurrencies, and DeFi	Blockchain-based technologies enabling cryptocurrencies and decentralized finance (DeFi) platforms for more transparent and decentralized financial systems.
Regtech, compliance, and security	Regulatory technology solutions for monitoring, reporting, compliance, fraud detection, and cybersecurity in the financial sector.
Infrastructure	Core banking systems, financial data aggregation services, open banking APIs, Banking-as-a-Service (BaaS) platforms, and advanced data analytics tools supporting the entire financial technology ecosystem.

== Revenue models ==
Financial technology companies utilize various revenue models, often combining multiple approaches to diversify income streams.

Transaction fees form a primary source of income for many financial technology businesses, particularly payment processors and cryptocurrency exchanges. These companies typically charge a percentage of each processed transaction. Some companies have expanded this model to include premium fees for services like instant payouts, catering to merchants who require immediate access to funds. Interchange fees represent another significant revenue stream, particularly for firms offering payment cards.

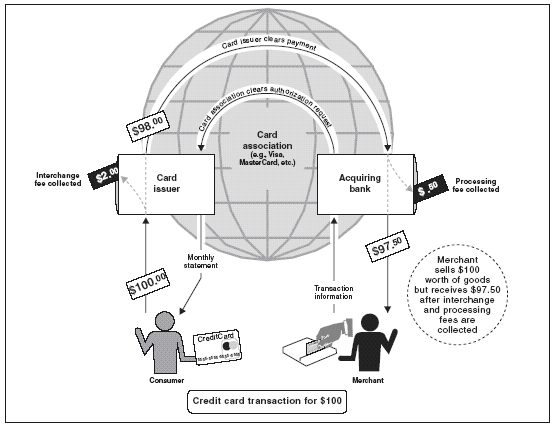
GAO report image explaining interchange fees

Subscription and freemium models allow companies to offer basic services at no cost while charging for advanced features or premium tiers. This approach is common among digital banks and financial management platforms. In the business-to-business (B2B) sector, usage-based pricing is prevalent, especially for API services. Financial technology infrastructure providers often charge based on the volume of API calls or transactions processed, enabling other businesses to access specialized financial services without developing them internally.

Interest-based revenue is crucial for many financial technology companies, particularly in the banking and lending sectors. Digital banks and investment platforms typically earn interest on customer deposits and cash balances. Lending platforms often combine interest revenue with loan sales, selling portions of their loan portfolios to other institutions or investors.

Data-driven revenue models, while potentially lucrative, have faced increasing scrutiny and regulation. Some firms engage in data monetization, selling aggregated or anonymized user data to third parties. However, this practice has raised privacy concerns and regulatory challenges. A less controversial approach involves leveraging user data for targeted advertising and lead generation, earning revenue through product recommendations and referral fees while providing free services to users.

Some revenue models, such as payment for order flow (PFOF) used by certain brokerage firms, occupy a regulatory gray area. While PFOF allows for commission-free trades, potentially benefiting retail investors, it has faced scrutiny due to concerns about conflicts of interest and best execution practices.

== Infrastructure ==
Modern financial technology depends on a shared layer of technical infrastructure that enables applications, banks, and third-party providers to exchange data and initiate transactions securely. Central to this infrastructure are standardised application programming interfaces (APIs), which allow software systems to communicate with one another without exposing underlying code or data directly. The security of these integrations is governed by protocols such as OAuth 2.0 and OpenID Connect, and in financial services specifically by the Financial-grade API (FAPI) standard — a security profile developed by the OpenID Foundation that defines how APIs handling sensitive financial data must authenticate clients, manage consent, and ensure non-repudiation of transactions.

Open banking represents the most significant regulatory formalisation of this API infrastructure to date. Under open banking frameworks, banks are required to expose customer account data and payment services to authorised third parties via standardised APIs, subject to explicit customer consent. The model was first mandated at scale by the European Union's revised Payment Services Directive (PSD2) in 2018 and the UK's Open Banking Standard, established following a 2016 Competition and Markets Authority ruling. Comparable frameworks have since been adopted globally, including the Financial Data Exchange (FDX) standard in the United States and the Consumer Data Right (CDR) in Australia, though these differ in terminology, technical standards, and implementation model. By 2024, the global open banking market was valued at approximately $31.6 billion and is projected to reach $135 billion by 2030.

== The impact of financial technology on the global economy ==
Financial innovations differ from other inventions in that they can directly affect the efficiency of the financial sector, through which savings and investment are intermediated in an economy, and consequently influence economic growth. FinTech is part of the digital economy, which has produced innovations that have transformed various aspects of everyday life, despite slowing productivity growth across advanced economies over several decades. FinTech has developed rapidly in countries with more open financial markets. One example is the e-payment system M-Pesa, which operates in Kenya, Tanzania, and other countries and has become one of the major FinTech success stories since its introduction. By effectively transforming mobile phones into payment accounts, M-Pesa has increased access to financial services among previously unbanked populations. It is an example of how FinTech has transformed the financial sector and increased economic efficiency. The permissive approach adopted by the Central Bank of Kenya allowed the sector to develop rapidly in the country.

This is consistent with a study by the Bank for International Settlements, which found that FinTech is most prominent in countries with less stringent banking regulations, higher incomes, and less competitive banking systems. If FinTech can improve financial inclusion in other countries as it has in Kenya, it could facilitate the more efficient channeling of savings into investment in industry, infrastructure, and human capital, which are important for economic growth. A report by the McKinsey Global Institute concluded that the widespread adoption and use of digital finance could increase the GDP of emerging economies by 6%, equivalent to a total of $3.7 trillion, by 2025. The report also estimated that digital finance could provide market access to 1.6 billion unbanked people, enable an additional $2.1 trillion in loans to individuals and small businesses, increase government tax revenue, and expand the balance sheets of financial services firms by as much as $4.2 trillion.

== Controversies ==
As financial technology companies seek to disrupt traditional financial services, some have been criticized for prioritizing growth over compliance, security, and consumer protection.

In a notable controversy, cryptocurrency exchange FTX collapsed in November 2022, facing accusations of deceptive practices, improper handling of client assets, and insufficient risk controls.

Sam Bankman-Fried, FTX's founder and CEO, was later convicted of wire fraud, conspiracy, and money laundering.

== See also ==
- Artificial intelligence in finance
- Financial technology in Australia
- Smart contract
- Trade finance technology
- Banking as a service
- Payments as a service
