= Wolfgang Lehmacher =

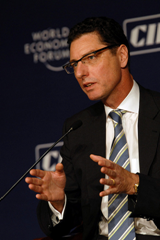
- Wolfgang Lehmacher at the World Economic Forum's India Economic Summit 2008
- Born: Helmut Wolfgang Lehmacher; June 4, 1960 (age 66); Bonn, West Germany

Wolfgang Lehmacher (born 1960 in Bonn, West Germany) is a businessman and practitioner in the field of supply chain, transport and logistics. His career spans executive positions and board memberships. Lehmacher was president and CEO of GeoPost Intercontinental, the global investment arm of French La Poste, in numerous senior leadership positions at TNT, and as director and head of Supply Chain, and Transport Industries at the World Economic Forum.

His expertise includes advising companies of all sizes and supporting organizations such as RISE (Research Institutes of Sweden), The Logistics and Supply Chain Management Society, Singapore, The European Freight and Logistics Leaders Forum, Brussels, and Global:SF in San Francisco. As a thought leader, business mentor, and technology advocate, Lehmacher actively contributes to the public discourse through writing and frequent speaking engagements worldwide, like the Annual Meeting of the World Economic Forum in Davos, the Global Leadership Lecture Series at MIT, and the IfM at University of Cambridge.

He is involved in EU-funded projects like CIRPASS, a digital product passport initiative, and BALTIC-FIT, which aims to enable maritime transport in the Baltic Sea Region to meet the 'Fit for 55' decarbonization targets. He was the lead author of the "Practical Playbook for Maritime Decarbonisation".

In collaboration with experts and academics, Lehmacher pioneered research methods, including the Claros study, which utilizes ChatGPT to generate expert-validated insights into maritime industry trends. The mentor at Tsai Center for Innovative Thinking at Yale is a founding member of the Logistikweisen, a logistics expert committee under the auspices of the German Federal Ministry BMDV, and NEXST, a think tank initiated by Reefknot, Kuehne & Nagel and SGInnovate in Singapore.

Lehmacher has written for the Financial Times, Nikkei Asian Review, and Business Insider. His authored books, published by Springer Gabler and others.

== Career ==
In 1980 Lehmacher joined German Red Cross organizing global emergency transports. Later, he was involved in setting up GD Express Worldwide, the consortium of five major post offices, German, French, Dutch, Swedish and Canadian, in Germany (1991–1992), managed the joint venture between Deutsche Post and TNT Express Worldwide (1994–1996), launched the expansion of TNT Express Worldwide operation in the Eastern European and Eastern Mediterranean regions (1997–1999), and played a major role in the European expansion of French La Poste (1999–2001), including the integration and consolidation of the pan-European parcel network DPD (2001–2005). In his capacity as president and CEO of GeoPost Intercontinental, Lehmacher led the global expansion of La Poste’s parcel business through a collaborative partnership model, a mix of investments, joint ventures, and alliances, resulting in a full coverage global network (2005-2010). As partner and managing director at global strategy boutique CVA, he oversaw the China and India businesses and led the firm's transportation and logistics practice (2010-2014). At the World Economic Forum, he has been driving intelligence building and stakeholder alignment initiatives in the fields of advanced technology and sustainability (2014-2018). The senior consultant is advisor to large corporates, investors, private equity funds, start-ups, and research institutes. Amongst other places, he has lived and worked in Cologne, Stuttgart, Paris, Shanghai, Hong Kong. Geneva, and New York.

== Publications ==
- Contributor of the book (in English): Applied Quantum Computing with Dynex: From Qubits to Unlocking the Future of Computing
- Co-author of the book (in English): Circular Economy and Sustainable Development. A Necessary Nexus for a Sustainable Future – 2024, Springer Gabler, Deutschland)
- Co-editor of the book (in English): Maritime Decarbonization – Practical Tools, Case Studies and Decarbonization Enablers – 2023 (Springer Gabler, Deutschland)
- Co-author of the book (in German): Circular Economy - 7. Industrielle Revolution: Der Weg zu mehr Nachhaltigkeit durch Kreislaufwirtschaft (mit Johann Bödecker) - 2023 (Springer Gabler, Deutschland)
- Co-author of the book Intersection: Reimagining the future of mobility across traditional boundaries, SEA 2021
- Co-author of the book (English): Digitizing and Automating Processes in Logistics, in: Disrupting Logistics: Startups, Technologies, and Investors Building Future Supply Chains - 2021 (Springer Gabler, Deutschland)
- Author of the book (in German): Digital einkaufen: Warum wir unsere Wohnzimmer in Marktplätze verwandelt haben (Digital shopping: Why we have turned our living rooms into marketplaces) – 2017 Springer, Germany
- Author of the book (English): The Global Supply Chain. How Technology and Circular Thinking Transform Our Future – 2017 Springer, Germany
- Author of the book (in German): Steht unsere Versorgung auf dem Spiel? Über terroristische Bedrohungen entlang der Supply Chain ( (Is our supply at stake? Terrorist threats along the supply chain) – 2016 Springer Gabler, Germany
- Author of the book (in German): Globale Supply Chain. Technischer Fortschritt, Transformation und Circular Economy (Global Supply Chain. Technological Progress, Transformation and Circular Economy) – 2016 Springer Gabler, Germany
- Author of the book (in German): Logistik im Zeichen der Urbanisierung. Versorgung von Stadt und Land im digitalen und mobilen Zeitalter" (Logistics in Light of Urbanisation. Supply of Urban and Rural Areas in the Digital Age) – 2015; Springer Gabler, Germany
- Co-author of the book (Mandarin): China Supply Chain Management Blue Book – 2015; China Fortune Press, People's Republic of China
- Co-author FAZ-Jahrbuch Consulting (in German): Digitale Revolution in der Supply Chain (Digital Revolution in the Supply Chain ) - 2014, FAZ-Jahrbuch Consulting (FAZ-Yearbook Consulting), Germany.
- Co-author of the Praxishandbuch Logistik (in German): Investitionen in Logistik und Infrastruktur in Deutschland und den BRICS (Investments in logistics and infrastructure in Germany and the BRICS) - 2013, WoltersKluwer
- Author of the book (in German): Wie Logistik unser Leben prägt. Der Wertbeitrag logistischer Lösungen für Wirtschaft und Gesellschaft (How Logistics Shapes Our Lives), – 2013 (Springer Gabler, Germany).
- Co-author of the book (English): The Secret Life of Decisions, How Unconscious Bias Subverts Your Judgement - 2013 (Gower Publishing, UK).
- Co-author of the reference book (in German): Fraud Management - Der Mensch als Schlüsselfaktor gegen Wirtschaftskriminalität - 2012 (Frankfurt School Verlag, Germany).

In addition, Lehmacher is author of numerous articles and whitepapers, mainly covering innovative transportation and logistics topics.

== Speaking events ==
Lehmacher is a regular speaker. The hundreds of appearances at events globally, a number of which have been held by the World Economic Forum, cover a broad range of themes, such as The Fallout: A New Global Corporate Landscape, The Asian Consumer: A Sustainability Champion in the Making? and Urbanization: The Unstoppable Global Trend.

Notable speaking engagements include the Global Competitiveness Forum in Riyadh, the Boao Forum in China, The Economist World in Dubai, World Bank, INK in association with TED, TPM Conferences in the United States and China, International Supply Chain Conference, Berlin, Ti Transportation Intelligence conferences, LogiSYM, IATA Symposia, Global Liner Shipping Conferences, The European Freight and Logistics Leaders’ Forum (F&L), Automotive Logistics, CogX, and the Horasis Global Business Meetings. He also shared his knowledge and experience at the MIT MITCentre of Transportation and Logistics, the IfM at the University of Cambridge, The Frankfurt School, and Cologne Business School Cologne Business School.

== Memberships and affiliations ==
He is member of the advisory board of The Logistics and Supply Chain Management Society, Singapore, ambassador of the European Freight and Logistics Leaders Forum (F&L), Brussels, and founding member of the Logistikweisen, a logistics expert committee under the auspices of the German Federal Ministry for Digital and Transport (Bundesministerium für Digitales und Verkehr), and the think tank NEXST, initiated by Reefknot Investments, Kuehne & Nagel and SGInnovate, Singapore. He is member of BVL International and was member of the German Club of Logistics, He is member of the Board of Governors of the Universal AI University in Mumbai, Maharashtra in India, and was member of the advisory board of Aidha in Singapore, the world's first micro-business school.

He advocates the principles underpinning the United Nations Global Compact (UNGC) and the 'Partnering Against Corruption Initiative' (PACI). Lehmacher regularly joins juries and committees like the IATA Air Cargo Innovation Awards, the Automotive Logistics Awards Europe, LogiSYM Awards, and the IDC Supply Chain Technology Leaders Recognition Program. He is also a mentor at the Tsai Center for Innovative Thinking at Yale University.
