= Do-it-yourself investing =

Self-directed approach to investment

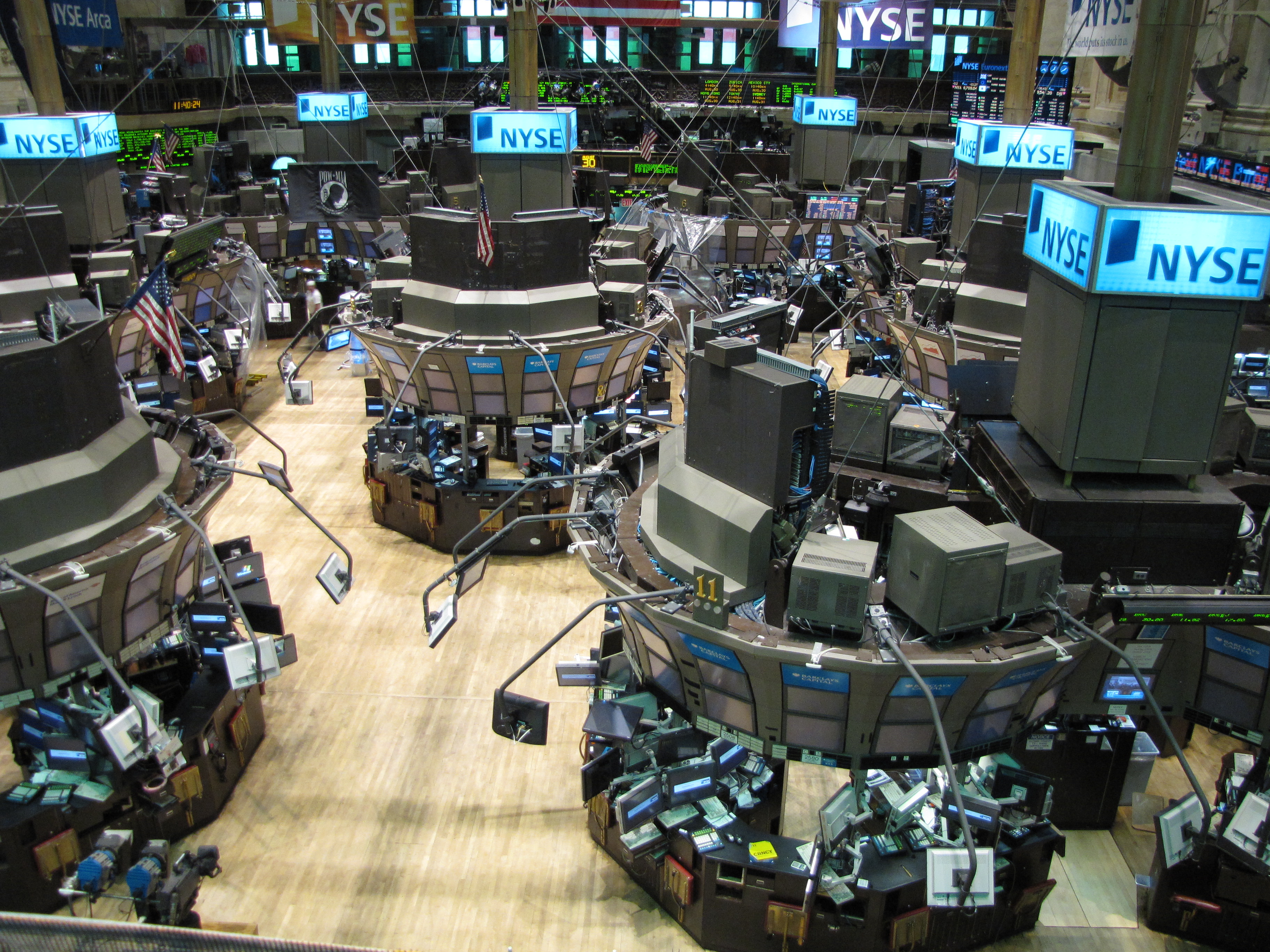
New York Stock Exchange (NYSE)

Do-it-yourself (DIY) investing, self-directed investing or self-managed investing is an investment approach where the investor chooses to build and manage their own investment portfolio instead of hiring an agent, such as a stockbroker, investment adviser, private banker, or financial planner.

== Overview ==
The DIY approach has pervaded many activities that were traditionally performed exclusively by institutions or trained professionals. A common approach to investing, for many investors, is to hire investment representation to build and manage their portfolios. The main duties of investment representatives are to provide ongoing advice, allocate money to asset classes and investment products, and to make portfolio management decisions.

Individual investors will often choose to manage their own investments rather than hiring outside representation. Common reasons for doing so include the avoidance of agency fees, dissatisfaction with the quality of service or the investment returns, distrust of the financial industry in general, or a desire to take control of the investing process.

In addition, the advent of discount brokerages, proliferation of free financial resources on the Internet, and the availability of online research tools have also contributed to a large increase in DIY investing in recent years. There has also been empirical evidence that spam e-mail aims to manipulate stock pricing by influencing would-be investors.

In summary, DIY investing contrasts with discretionary investment management in that the investor retains full control over investment decisions, whereas in discretionary management, a professional makes decisions on the investor's behalf within agreed parameters.

== Accessibility ==
There are many advantages to do-it-yourself investing, particularly in the Information Technology sector. The market for investing has very easy entry, meaning, DIY investors can engage in direct investing programs with lower minimum investment requirements, allowing access to stock ownership. With pay-as-you-go, investors can purchase smaller amounts of shares more frequently, allowing dollar-cost averaging and reducing the challenge of timing the market. Lastly, direct investing gives important educational tools for individuals, including children, about investing and financial markets.

Some self-investment platforms include:

- Robinhood
- E*trade from Morgan Stanley
- Vanguard
- Interactive Brokers LLC
- Merrill Edge

== DIY investor types ==
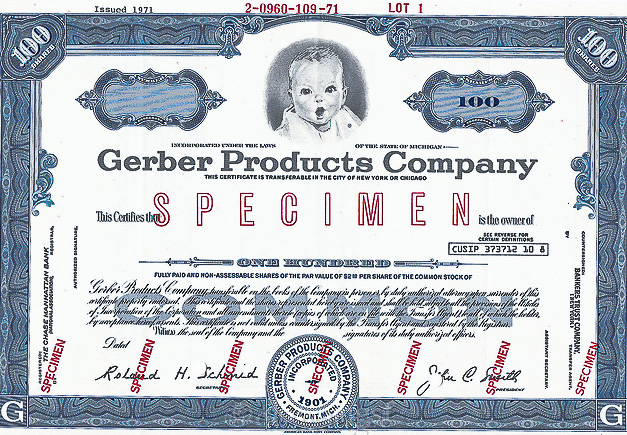
1971 Stock Certificate

A common misconception regarding DIY investing is that it mainly involves the ongoing research, selection and management of individual securities such as stocks or bonds. However, a managed fund, a group of securities packaged together as one investment product or “fund” and managed by a portfolio manager is available to simplify the investing process. Mutual funds, exchange-traded funds (ETFs), fund of funds (FoFs) and target date funds (TDFs) are examples of managed funds. Therefore, given the generous investment product landscape, DIY investors have various portfolio management options ranging from simple to complex.

DIY investor types

- Managed Fund investor: an investor who builds and manages a portfolio consisting of one or more managed fund. This approach puts the onus on a portfolio manager to manage the individual securities within a fund. Since 2015, Managed (active) funds have lost cash every year while Index Funds have gained market share.
- Index Stock Fund investor: investors who purchase index funds to assemble a portfolio. The most popular index funds are broad market indexes that are widely regarded as the cheapest way to earn a market return. Broad market index funds are commonly paired with a bond index fund and periodic rebalancing. This combination is so popular that Target Date Funds were invented to turn the pairing into a single product.
- Individual securities investor: an investor who builds and manages a portfolio consisting of individual securities. The portfolio management activities relating to this approach are very similar to that of a registered portfolio manager.
- Trader: a trader isn't an investor per se since they don’t look to hold securities for an extended period of time. However, under the DIY moniker this investor seeks to generate returns by continuously buying and selling securities. They may use an array of investment strategies and securities to build and manage their portfolios.
- Hybrid: an investor who uses a combination of the above investing approaches.

== Process ==
The DIY investing process is similar to many other DIY processes and it mirrors steps found in the financial planning process used by the Certified Financial Planning Board. Whether a DIY investor or a certified professional, investing in the stock market involves risk and unpredictable fluctuations. It has been said, "a blindfolded monkey throwing darts at a newspaper’s financial pages could select a portfolio that would do just as well as one carefully selected by experts."

1. Develop financial and investment literacy.
2. Outline objectives, desires, needs and priorities.
3. Gather, analyze and consider relevant information.
4. Develop strategies, plans and ideas.
5. Construct an investment management plan.
6. Implement plan.
7. Monitor the plan and make changes accordingly.

== Considerations ==
Without the use of investment representatives, DIY investors must concern themselves with various investment management activities and factors that relate to building and managing their portfolios.

Building

- Financial Information Ecosystem
- Discount Brokerage Selection
- Investor Documentation

Managing

- Portfolio Documentation
- Asset Allocation
- Investment Strategy
- Investment Products
- Fees and Investment Expenses
- Investment Accounts

Taxes

A stock trade is considered a capital gain or loss and is subjected to a tax rate based on whether the stock was held for less or more than one year. Typically, the tax rate is lower for holding a stock for a year or longer. If held for a short-term, the tax rate is treated the same as ordinary income and is typically higher, with some exceptions such as property acquired by gift, property acquired from a decedent, patent property, or commodity futures. Tax rates are subject to change each year and with new administrations.

== Advantages ==
=== Fees ===
The main negative effect of advisory and management fees is that they are generally applied regardless of the performance of an investment portfolio. This can substantially reduce an individual's wealth over time and is one of the primary reasons that many DIY Investors prefer to take control of their investment funds. "Typical characteristics of the Do It Yourself (DIY) investor include contrarian points of view and modest budgets that can't afford professional advisors."

The use of investment advisory services attracts fees that are paid indirectly or directly to the various stakeholders who facilitate the investment management process. This may include investment representatives, portfolio managers, brokerages, operating expenses, trading costs and miscellaneous items.

A DIY investor has the potential to reduce fees by eliminating the various middlemen located throughout the advised-client model by accessing investment products and securities through a discount brokerage.

=== Returns ===
As a result of reducing fees, DIY investors have the potential to increase their returns by retaining the expenses they would have otherwise paid to investment representatives, middlemen and financial intermediaries.

=== Qualitative ===
DIY investors may experience qualitative advantages when compared to advised-clients such as empowerment, independence and confidence.

== Disadvantages ==
While DIY investing does have its perks, it also has hidden dangers and drawbacks. Investors may find themselves in complex situations when neglecting to do the right research or seek professional assistance. Those drawbacks include:

=== Tax implications ===
Unexpected tax bills due to regulations such as wash sale rules can sometimes sneak up on un expecting DIY investors, this can lead to significant liabilities when profits are low.

=== Lack of knowledge ===
Amateur investors often make costly mistakes because they do not fully understand the complexities of trading and tax laws.

=== High trading volume risks ===
Engaging in an extensive amount of trades can complicate tax calculations and increase the chances of mistakes.

=== Mental pressures ===
The pressure of self managing investments and the potential financial losses can lead to emotional distress and intense pressures.

=== Emotional decision-making ===
Amateur investors often let their emotions dictate their investing choices which can lead to impulsive selling or overconfidence during market highs.

=== Time consuming ===
Investing can be a time consuming activity especially when does as a side hustle. Between researching, monitoring portfolios, and staying updated on market trends the amount of commitment needed stacks up.

=== Limited access to resources ===
DIY investors may not have access to the same tools or insight that professionals use, putting them at a disadvantage to everyone else.

== See also ==
- FIRE movement
- Self-directed IRA
- Discretionary investment management
