= Unified managed account =

Managed investment accounts

Unified managed accounts are managed investment accounts that have developed out of separately managed accounts (SMAs). Where a separate account holds the securities associated with a single investment manager or style managed for a client, a unified managed account typically holds multiple separate accounts, as well as other investment products such as mutual funds and exchange traded funds. Unified managed accounts also typically automate services such as rebalancing, cashflow management, and other services that are typically handled manually by financial advisors or institutions when using a separate account. A unified managed account removes the need to have more than one account and combines all of the assets into one account with a single registration.
