= Managed account =

In banking, a managed account is a fee-based investment management product for high-net-worth individuals. The main appeal for wealthy individuals is the access to professional money managers, a high degree of customization and greater tax efficiencies in a fee-based product. They are not to be confused with managed bank accounts such as thinkmoney, e-money accounts and basic bank accounts, all of which are consumer banking products in the UK.

Managed accounts started as separately managed accounts (SMAs) and have since evolved into multiple strategy accounts (MSAs) and the rapidly emerging unified managed accounts (UMAs). There is broad agreement that managed accounts provide the added benefits of greater transparency, liquidity and control.

Managed account minimums and the cost to operate managed account programs have steadily dropped as technology helps with efficiency and scale. Increasingly, managed account products are seeing interest from the "mass affluent" as well.

The retail managed accounts industry was sized at $11 trillion in 2024. Managed Accounts are typically offered by global investment banks and specialist investment firms.

== In Australia ==
In Australia, Managed Discretionary Account (MDA) is a popular type of managed account, along with SMA.

== See also ==
- Discretionary investment management
