= Raiz, Iran =

Raeiz راييز
- Village
- Location within Iran
- Coordinates: 28°00′29″N 56°08′25″E
- Country: Iran
- Province: Hormozgan
- County: Hajjiabad
- Bakhsh: Fareghan
- Rural District: Ashkara
- Time zone: UTC+3:30 (IRST)
  - Summer (DST): UTC+4:30 (IRDT)

Raeiz (Persian: راييز, also Romanized as Rā’īz) is a village in Ashkara Rural District, Fareghan District, Hajjiabad County, Hormozgan Province, Iran. At the 2023 census, its population was 200, in 85 families.
