= Betterment (company) =

American technology company

- Type: Private
- Industry: Investment services
- Founded: 2008; 18 years ago
- Founders: Jon Stein; Eli Broverman
- Headquarters: New York City, United States
- Key people: Sarah Levy (CEO)
- Products: Financial services, asset management, portfolio management, trust services
- AUM: US$56 billion (2025)
- Parent: Betterment Holdings, Inc.
- Divisions: Betterment at Work Betterment Advisor Solutions
- Subsidiaries: MTG, LLC.
- Website: www.betterment.com

Betterment is an American financial advisory company which provides digital investment, retirement and cash management services.

The company is based in New York City. Betterment LLC is a registered investment advisor, registered with the Securities and Exchange Commission, its affiliate Betterment Securities is a broker-dealer and member of the Financial Industry Regulatory Authority (FINRA).

As of mid-2026, the company reported managing more than $70 billion in assets under management for over one million customers.

== History ==
=== Foundation and launch ===
Betterment was founded in 2008 in New York City by Jon Stein, a Columbia Business School MBA graduate, and Eli Broverman, a graduate of NYU School of Law.

Betterment, LLC was organized as a Delaware limited liability company on April 7, 2009. The parent company for Betterment LLC and Betterment Securities, Betterment Holdings, Inc., was established in Delaware on January 29, 2008.

The company launched at TechCrunch Disrupt New York in May-June 2010, where it was one of five finalists and was named "Biggest New York Disruptor". Within a day of launching, nearly 500 people had signed up, and more than 20 investment firms contacted the company seeking further financial information.

=== Operations ===
Betterment's business model includes three areas of business: retail investment, a platform for advisors, and a 401(k) product for businesses.

The company provides automated, algorithm-driven financial advice, and licensed financial advisors offer over-the-phone consultations to customers who opt for additional support. Its retail platform offers taxable and tax-advantaged investment accounts, including traditional and Roth individual retirement accounts (IRAs).

In October 2014, Betterment launched a business-to-business offering called Betterment Institutional, subsequently renamed Betterment for Advisors, a digital platform for managing client assets using Betterment's built-in financial advice. In January 2017, the Financial Planning Association (FPA) and Betterment for Advisors ran a program on digital investment advice for the association's members.

In January 2016, the company launched Betterment for Business—a 401(k) platform aimed at small- to medium-sized businesses.

In December 2020, Betterment's founder Jon Stein stepped down as CEO and was succeeded by former Viacom Media Networks COO Sarah Levy.

In February 2022, the 401(k) business rebranded to Betterment at Work and announced the acquisition of the partner and customer relationships of Gradvisor, a platform that provides personalized college savings plans. The same month, the company announced it had acquired Makara, a cryptocurrency portfolio manager.

In October 2022, Betterment launched a crypto offering Crypto Investing by Betterment, in which customers can invest in crypto assets. Around this time, Betterment raised fees for smaller accounts, introducing a $4 monthly charge in place of its percentage-based fee for balances below a set threshold.

In December 2023, a survey by Betterment at Work delved into the retirement preparedness of the U.S. workforce. The study, comparing data from 2022, surveyed 1,000 full-time U.S. employees to analyze changes in retirement readiness and financial wellness over the past year. It also explored shifts in employee benefit preferences and how these trends correlate with the economic landscape.

In January 2024, Betterment at Work introduced a new commercial product enabling small business employers to automatically match employee student loan payments with a 401(k) contribution.

Betterment for Advisors, its RIA custody division, expanded its custom portfolio construction menu by incorporating thousands of mutual funds for the first time. This initiative aligns with the mutual fund's 100th anniversary.

In April 2024, Betterment announced the acquisition of Marcus Invest from Goldman Sachs. Marcus Invest will start transferring these accounts to Betterment.

In July 2024, Betterment introduced the Goldman Sachs Tax-Smart Bonds portfolio, a municipal bond portfolio for taxable accounts.

On September 12, 2024, Betterment for Advisors, the company's RIA custody division, was renamed Betterment Advisor Solutions following the addition of new portfolio management and retirement plan features.

On February 26, 2025 Betterment announced the acquisition of automated investing business of Ellevest, the investing and wealth management company built by and for women. This announcement follows other Betterment acquisitions, including the acquisition of Wealthsimple’s US advisory accounts in 2021 and Goldman Sachs’ Marcus Invest accounts in 2024. The next day, Betterment launched Solo 401(k)s to its Betterment Advisor Solutions client base built upon its existing record-keeping system. It aims to provide retirement products to self-employed owners.

In December 2025, Betterment announced that starting January 2026, the monthly fee for smaller accounts would increase from $4 to $5, with the threshold for the standard 0.25% annual fee rising from $20,000 to $24,000.

In January 2026, Betterment confirmed a databreach in which hackers gained access to names, email and postal addresses, phone numbers, and dates of birth for an undisclosed number of customers. The Hackers then used the data to send fraudulent notifications to customers attempting to solicit $10,000 in a crypto scam.

== Finances ==
Betterment has received funding from Bessemer Venture Partners, Menlo Ventures, Anthemis Group, Kinnevik, Francisco Partners, Globespan Capital Partners, Citi Ventures, The Private Shares Fund, Aflac Ventures and ID8 Investments.

In September 2021, the company secured $160 million in growth capital, consisting of a $60 million Series F equity round led by Treasury and a $100 million credit facility, established with ORIX Corporation USA’s Growth Capital group and Runway Growth Capital. This financing valued the company at nearly $1.3 billion.

== Awards and recognition ==
WSJ's Buy Side recognized Betterment LLC as the Best Overall Robo Advisor based on criteria including their fees, investment strategies and investor services, including financial planning, tax-loss harvesting and availability of a premium service.
