= Pensions & Investments =

Financial magazine

- Categories: Business
- Frequency: Biweekly
- Circulation: 40,000
- Publisher: Nikki Pirrello
- Founder: Rance Crain
- Founded: 1973; 52 years ago
- First issue: October 29, 1973
- Company: Crain Communications
- Country: United States
- Based in: New York City
- Language: English
- Website: pionline.com
- ISSN: 0095-4772

Pensions & Investments (P&I) is a business magazine that focuses on pensions and investment management for institutional investors. It is owned by Detroit-based Crain Communications.

== History ==
In 1973, Crain Communications President Rance Crain established P&I as a spin-off from Business Insurance , an insurance journal established by his father in 1917. While Business Insurance had covered pensions, Crain thought a new publication was required to cover the growing complexities of pension investments.

The first issue of P&I came out on October 29, 1973, just about a year before the Employee Retirement Income Security Act of 1974 was signed into law by then-President Gerald Ford. The main emphasis was on news with the first issue running a front-page story headlined, "IH dumps Harris, two other managers."

P&I expanded beyond pensions to cover other forms of institutional investments such as defined contribution plans, endowments and foundations, and sovereign wealth funds.

In October 2004, Morningstar, Inc. acquired a separate account database from P&I.

In October 2012, P&I opened an editorial bureau in Singapore to provide more coverage on Asia.

From its first issue onwards, P&I publishes on a biweekly basis.
