= Wuaneita Society =

Women's group at the University of Alberta

The Wauneita Society
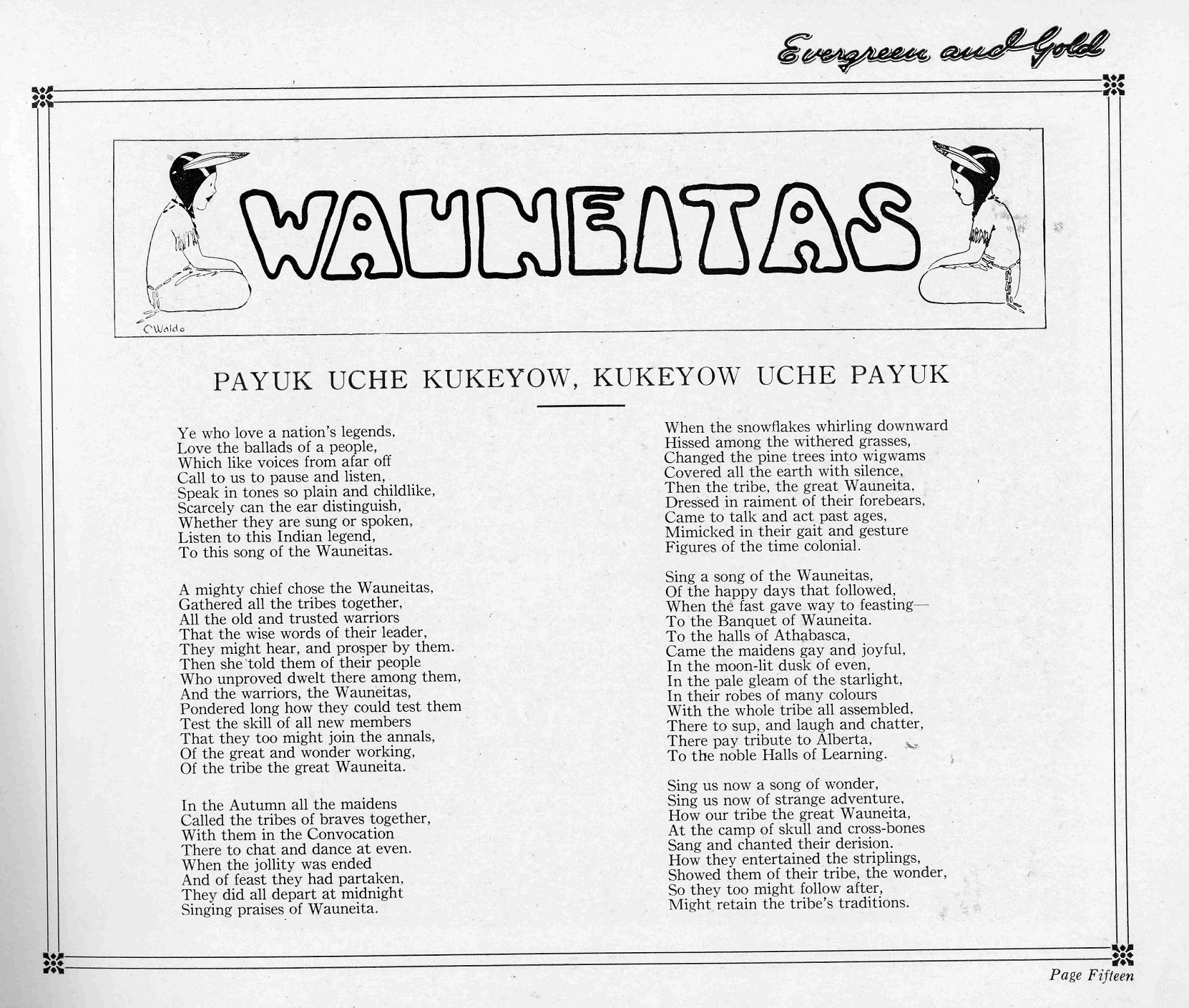
- Named after: Rough translation of the Cree word for kind-hearted
- Formation: 1908
- Founded at: University of Alberta, Edmonton
- Dissolved: 1973
- Type: Women's club
- Members: All female students
- Formerly called: Seven Independent Sisters (1908), Wauneita Club (1909)

The Wauneita Society was a women's group at the University of Alberta from 1908 to 1973. For many decades, it functioned as a support system for the relatively few female students on campus. The group organized lectures, social events, and fundraisers, and eventually operated its own women-only study hall in the old Students' Union Building. The group's core traditions and identity were heavily appropriated from stereotypes of Cree culture, at a time in Canadian history when Indigenous communities were criminalized for practising their culture.

== Founding and identity ==
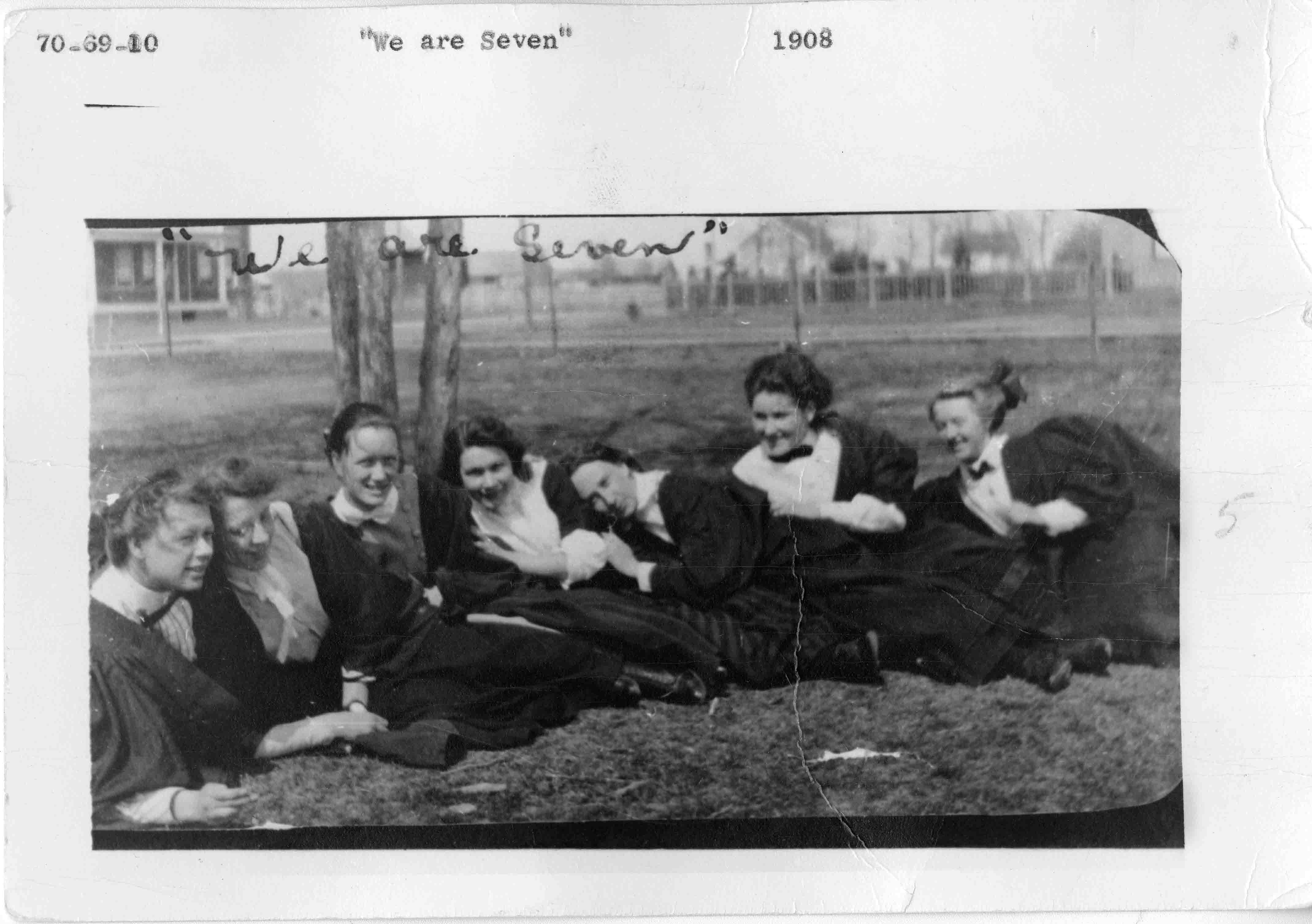
The seven original members of the Wuaneita Society's predecessor, Seven Independent Spinsters. Source: University of Alberta Archives

Of the 45 students in the University's first cohort in 1908, seven were women. These original seven formed a type of sorority, called Seven Independent Spinsters, or S.I.S., with the intention of supporting the women's social and academic needs. In 1909, when it became clear that there would be more than seven members, the group changed its name to the Wuaneita Club, and then to the Wuaneita Society in 1910.

Like the Greek culture of fraternities and sororities, the Wuaneita women looked to other cultures to develop their identity and establish a unique character. While histories of the organization note that the members chose their moniker from the Cree word for kind-hearted, there is no mention of what that Cree word was; the closest Cree word to Wuaneita is wanêyihtam, which translates to indicate a lack of logical thinking. The motto of the group, "payuk uche kukeyow, mena kukeyow uche payuk," is a grammatically rough translation into Cree of "all for one, one for all."

In its early days, the club organized fundraising events, debates, lectures, dances and other social events and began the tradition of initiating all new female students. All female students at the University were initiated into the Society each fall and paid a 75 cent membership fee.

== Growth and dissolution ==
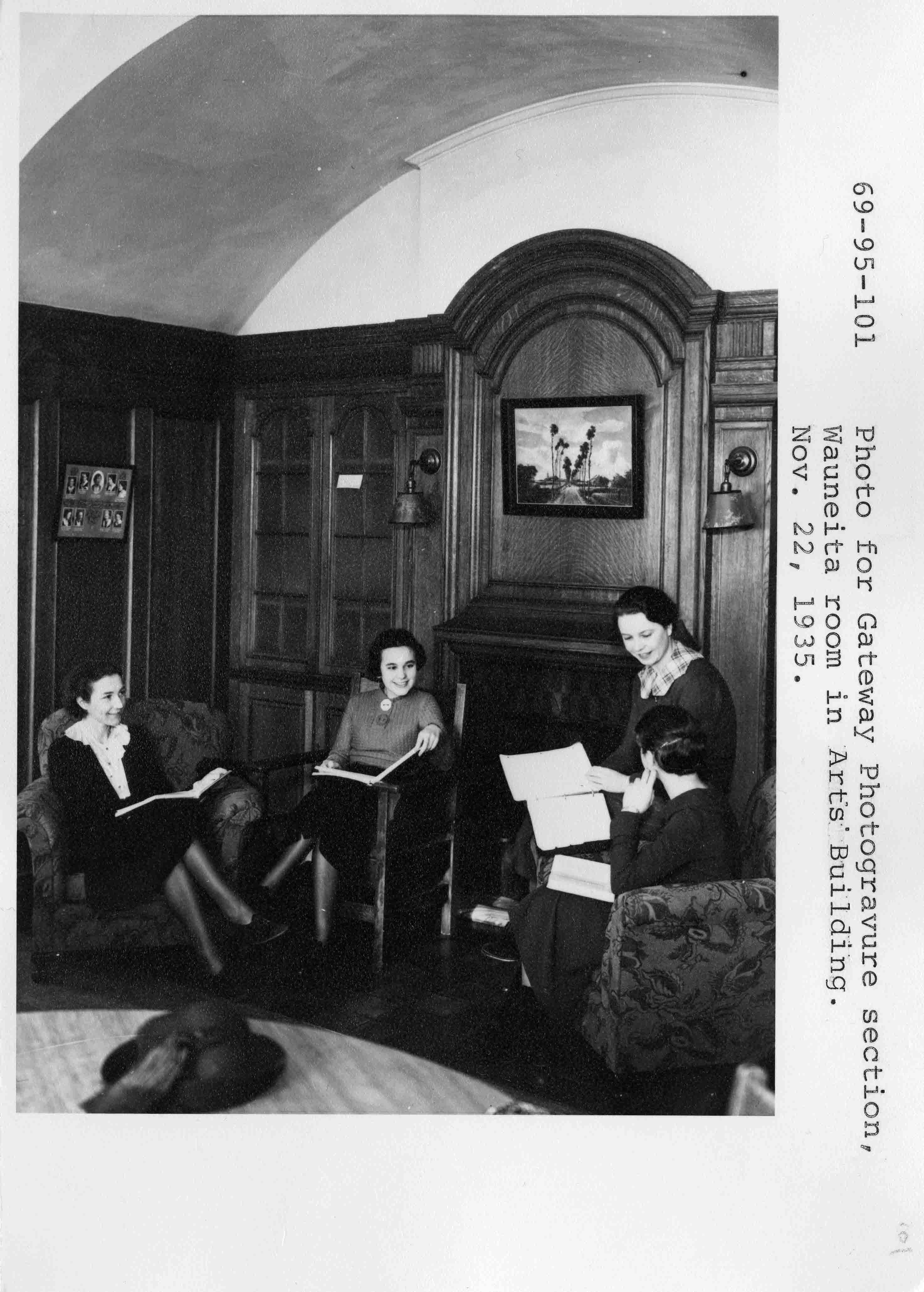
Three women sitting in the Wuaneita Room, a wood-panelled women-only study hall, at the University of Alberta in 1935. Source: University of Alberta Archives

Later, in the 1950s and 60s, the students operated Wuaneita Hall in the old Students' Union Building as a women-only space for studying and socializing.

Throughout the 60s and 70s, as the university's female population grew, the club's thousands of members clashed over the group's purpose: some wanted to continue focusing on etiquette and domesticity while others were keen to address progressive issues like birth control and drug use. The Club wound down in 1973.

== Cultural appropriation ==
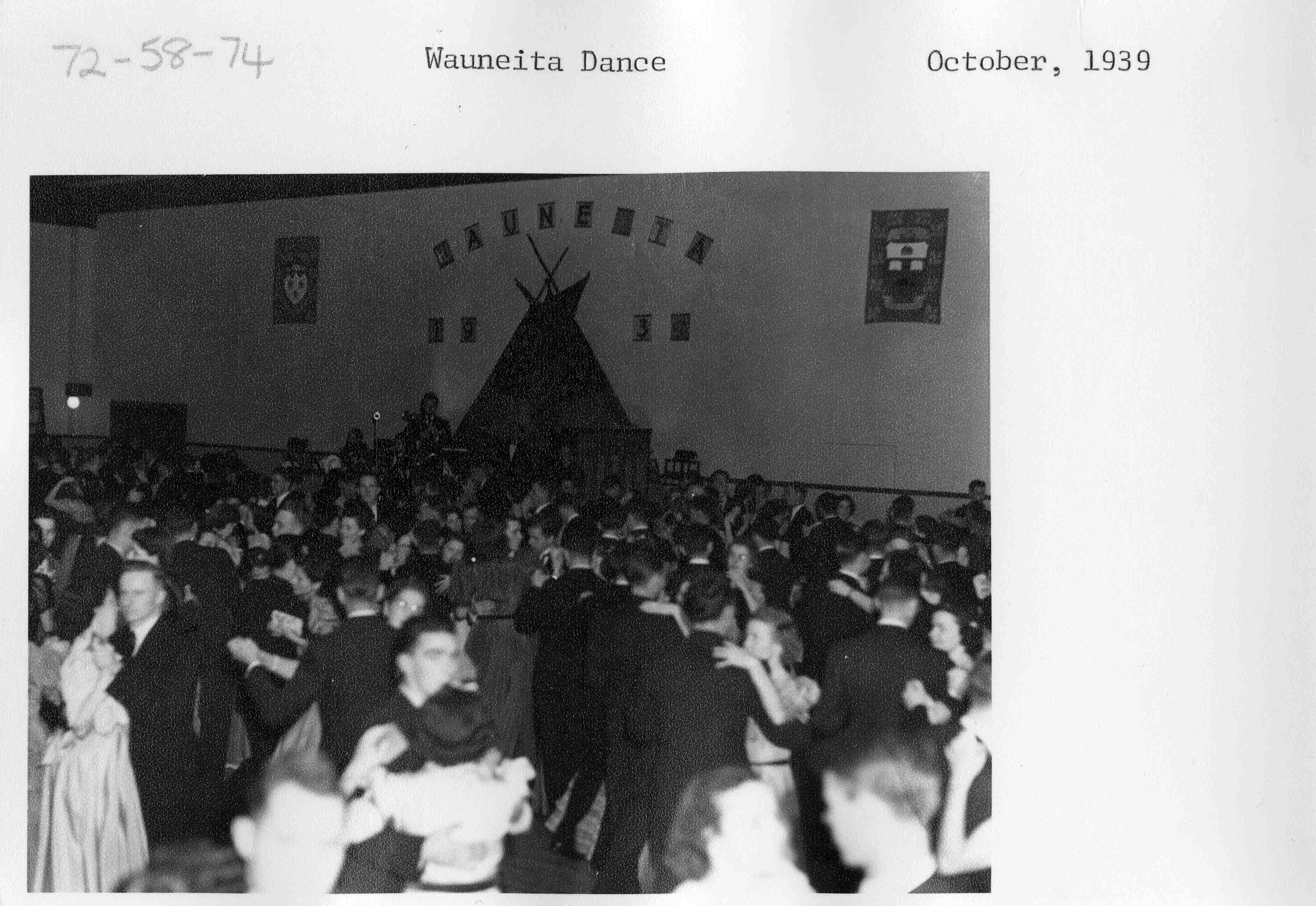
Wuaneita Society Dance, 1939. Source: University of Alberta Archives

The name, culture, and traditions of the Wuaneita Society are heavily appropriated from stereotypes of Cree culture; the women often called themselves "Tribe Wuaneita". The name Wuaneita is a rough equivalent to the Cree word meaning "kind-hearted". Initiation ceremonies featured First Nations accoutrements like feathers and headdresses, and initiates were welcomed using a "blanket of friendship" that would be draped over each woman's shoulders by the "Big Chief," the society president. The motto of the group was "payuk uche kukeyow, mena kukeyow uche payuk," a rough translation into Cree of "all for one, one for all" that is still engraved above the outer doors of Pembina Hall on main campus.

In 1950, the new Students Union Building opened on campus and contained several student lounges, including an all-woman room for the Wuaneita Society. The lounge was decorated with a large mural, commissioned by the Society from arts professor Henry George Glyde to depict an "ancient Cree legend," but there is no mention of which legend. The work is titled When All the World was Burned and it remained on display on campus in the Rutherford Library atrium until early 2022, when it was removed and returned to the Students' Union.

For much of the Wuaneita Society's existence, as they were coopting First Nations traditions and ceremonies, the Potlatch ban was in effect in Canada. While the Society was using First Nations culture to build a bond among female students at the university, the Canadian government was arresting Indigenous peoples across the country for the same practises.
