= School of Library and Information Studies at the University of Alberta =

The School of Library and Information Studies
- Motto: Quaecumque vera (Latin)
- Motto in English: Whatsoever things are true
- Type: Public, Flagship
- Established: 1968
- Affiliations: University of Alberta, Edmonton
- Chairperson: Dr. Kenneth Gariepy
- Administrative staff: 9 full-time continuing appointment academics; adjuncts and sessionals; and support staff.
- Location: Edmonton, Alberta, Canada
- Colours: Green and gold
- Website: uofa.ualberta.ca/education/departments/school-of-library-and-information-studies

The School of Library and Information Studies is situated at the University of Alberta (also known as UAlberta, U of A) in Edmonton and is part of the Faculty of Education. The School offers a Master's program in Library and Information Studies (MLIS) that is accredited by the American Library Association, as well as combined programs with a Master of Arts in Digital Humanities (MLIS/MA in DH) and a Master of Business Administration (MLIS/MBA). SLIS offers an Individual Interdisciplinary PhD opportunity in conjunction with other University of Alberta departments that serve as home units for PhD programs. The School also offers the only fully online MLIS in Canada.

== History ==
In 1965 the University of Alberta Board of Governors decided to create a library school at its Edmonton Campus. The plan for the new School of Library Science was completed in 1966, and the first students began the Bachelor of Library Science (BLS) program in 1968.

The first program that was offered by the School of Library Science was the BLS. This program began with a 4-week orientation, which included a road trip across the prairies to visit different libraries in Canada. This program was granted accreditation by the American Library Association in 1970. This accreditation was also granted to the first graduating class, which had graduated the year before. The Master of Library Science was added to the programs offered in 1971 as a one-year degree designed to be completed after the BLS. In 1974 this program was updated to become a 2-year MLS program to maintain the standards which had been set for library education across Canada. In 1975 the school changed its title to become the Faculty of Library Science. The BLS was removed in 1976. Twelve years later, the Faculty of Library Science changed its name to the Faculty of Library and Information Studies, offering the current Master of Library and Information Studies degree. In 1992 the Faculty of Library and Information Studies was placed within the Faculty of Education, and renamed as the School of Library and Information Studies. In 2003, the joint MA-MLIS Degree was introduced. The school introduced the first Canadian completely online MLIS offering in 2013 and the combined MBA-MLIS in 2014. In 2015, SLIS welcomed the inaugural Indigenous Internship Program, sponsored by the University of Alberta Libraries. The school celebrated its 50th anniversary and 5th year of its fully online teaching and learning stream in 2018.

== Programs ==
=== MLIS ===
The School has both online and on campus course-based MLIS offerings. Effective July 1, 2019, the MLIS consists of 39 credits. The School also has an on campus thesis-based MLIS offering.

=== Combined Programs ===
- The combined Master's of Business Administration (MBA) /MLIS is a course-based inter-faculty joint degree. The MBA portion of this degree is organized by the University of Alberta School of Business.
- The combined Master of Arts in Digital Humanities (DH) /MLIS is a three-year inter-faculty joint degree with both extensive coursework and a thesis component. The DH portion is organized through the Digital Humanities Department within Interdisciplinary Studies at the University of Alberta.

=== Doctorate of Philosophy ===
The school has an individual interdisciplinary PhD opportunity for which another department on campus serves as the home department.

=== Experiential learning ===
Partners’ Week is a volunteer program that connects students with LIS professionals in Edmonton, to discover more about work environments, different types of employment, and issues facing librarians in the workplace.

The U of A offers numerous networking events throughout the year including the annual student-run Forum for Information Professionals conference, career talks, and research colloquiums.

SLIS has a document with a complete overview of student professional development activities at the school.

== Research ==
Research conducted by professors and students at SLIS is highly valued and encouraged. The school fosters an interest in diverse topics in library and information studies and encourages their students and faculty to explore any area of interest. Current areas of research that faculty are engaged with include critical approaches in LIS; digital libraries; expressive freedom; human computer interaction; human information interaction; information ethics, retrieval, and sharing; interactive information retrieval; knowledge management; learning and data analytics; online communities; open education practices and resources; open source software; platforms, publishing, media, and LIS; rural broadband; social informatics; telecommunications policy; and web archiving. The annual Forum for Information Professionals is another event where students are able to showcase their research projects and share them with other information professionals in this student-run one-day conference.

== Student groups ==
- Library and Information Students’ Association (LISSA): The Library and Information Students’ Association represents all students enrolled at the school. The Association acts as a liaison between the students and faculty and is also responsible for putting on a number of social activities including a Welcome event and the year end party.
- Future Librarians for Intellectual Freedom (FLIF): The Future Librarians for Intellectual Freedom group work to promote awareness of social responsibilities and intellectual freedom library-related issues for the public and for information professionals.
- Forum for Information Professionals (FIP): The Forum for Information Professionals is a one-day event held on the University of Alberta campus. It offers librarians and information professionals from across Alberta a day to present and discuss topics related to librarianship. In 2026, FIP celebrated its 40th year with a historical retrospective.

== Alumni ==
The Library and Information Studies Alumni Association (LISAA) represented all alumni of the SLIS program, alongside graduates of the previous Bachelor of Library Science degree. As of February 12, 2024, due to a lack of volunteers, the LISAA Alumni Chapter is inactive.

== See also ==
- Canadian Library Association
