= University of Alberta Faculty of Extension =

- Type: Faculty
- Established: 1912
- Parent institution: University of Alberta
- Undergraduates: 8500
- Location: Edmonton, Alberta, Canada
- Website: www.extension.ualberta.ca

The University of Alberta Faculty of Extension, founded in 1912, is located in the historic Enterprise Square building in downtown Edmonton, Alberta, Canada. The University of Alberta Faculty of Extension is a faculty of the University of Alberta and places heavy focus on research and community engagement, including continuing education and professional development.

== History ==
=== The First Decade (1912–1922) ===
The University of Alberta established the Department of Extension in 1912 giving it the mandate of "carrying the University to the people." With this mindset, A.E. Ottewell was appointed the first Director for the Department of Extension.

When the Department of Extension was first founded, Alberta had a mostly-rural population of 375,000 people that was widely spread throughout the province. To meet the needs of the community, the Department of Extension began to offer conferences on rural leadership. It also delivered over 100 lectures each year, and staff members would travel thousands of miles by train, car, and horse to present these lectures.

Two other early and popular initiatives were the Extension Library and the Magic Lantern service.

The Extension Library began in 1913, and boxes of books were available to any settlement in Alberta, providing literature to communities that otherwise would be without. Scripts for drama productions and "package libraries" focusing on one area for debate teams were also available in the Extension Library. The Extension Library operated from 1913 until 1987.

The Magic Lantern service began as slideshow programs on a wide variety of subjects. In 1917, the Magic Lantern service became the first educational film library in Canada, after securing a $4,000 grant from the Goodyear Tire and Rubber Company. Over the next several decades, the Magic Lantern service offered both slideshow and film presentations.

=== The 1920s, 1930s, and 1940s ===
Between 1920 and 1950, the Department of Extension continued to focus on serving the agricultural, educational, and cultural needs of rural Alberta. One way of reaching great distances effectively was radio. In 1925, a series of lectures began to air on CJCA. Three years later, in 1928, the Faculty of Extension founded CKUA.

The Department of Extension was also the catalyst for the founding of the Banff School of Fine Arts, known today as The Banff Centre, with the first classes being held in 1934.

In 1940, "refresher" courses were offered to municipal administrators, and the success of these courses resulted in the formation of similar courses through the 1940s. During the 1940s there was also a large growth in classes and lectures offered in Edmonton and Calgary. The first Inter-University Drama Festival and the Western Board of Music were also both founded during this time.

=== The 1950s, 1960, and 1970s ===
The 1950s introduced a period of intense industrialization in Alberta, due largely to the discovery of the oil field Leduc, Alberta. In 1950, the first "mud school" was established in a partnership between the University of Alberta Department of Extension, the University of Alberta's Department of Chemical and Petroleum Engineering, and several associations within the oil industry (this program would eventually become the Petroleum Industry Training Service).

The success of the "mud schools" led to an increase in the development of non-credit courses, classes, seminars, and conferences. These diverse course selections were offered in Edmonton, Calgary, Red Deer, and Lethbridge. The diverse course selection led to a growing interest for a credentialed program, and in 1957, the Certificate in Social Welfare became the first of many Certificate programs offered by the Department of Extension.

As the oil boom continued in the 1970s, the Department of Extension offered courses in Fort McMurray, Inuvik, Yellowknife, Hinton, and Edmonton.

In 1973, English as a second language began to be offered through the Department of Extension.

On November 1, 1975, the Department of Extension was granted full faculty status by the University of Alberta, becoming the Faculty of Extension.

=== The 1980s and 1990s ===
The 1980s continued to see large increases in enrollment. By 1980/81, there were over 35,423 students enrolled in the Faculty of Extension's certificate programs, citation program, home study courses, and other courses available in fine arts and liberal studies. Throughout the next two decades, the number and diversity of courses offered continued to grow.

In 1999, the Master of Arts in Communications and Technology was established, becoming the first master's program offered by the Faculty of Extension.

=== The 2000s to present ===
The 2000s continued to be a period of growth for the Faculty of Extension. In 2003, the first Information Access and Privacy Conference was held, and has since been an annual event.

In 2006, the City-Regions Studies Centre was established.

After being located on the University of Alberta's main campus since its founding, in 2007, the Faculty of Extension moved into the renovated and historic Enterprise Square. Also in 2007, the Faculty of Extension hosted the 54th annual Canadian Association of University Continuing Education (CAUCE) Conference.

== Academic Studies ==
The University of Alberta Faculty of Extension offers general interest courses, topic seminars, industry designations, Certificate programs, Citation programs, as well as one Graduate Degree program. Additionally, customized corporate training and English Language programs are also offered through the Faculty of Extension.

=== Diploma Programs ===
- Full-Stack Web Development
- Occupational Health & Safety
- Supply Management Training

=== Certificate Programs ===
- Applied Land Use Planning
- Business Analysis
- C# Back End Web Development
- Construction Administration and Management
- Digital Marketing
- Environmental Remediation
- Front End Web Development
- Human Resource Management
- Information Access and Protection of Privacy
- Land Reclamation
- Leadership (Advanced Certificate)
- Management Development
- Management Development for Police Services
- National Advanced Certificate in Local Authority Administration – Parts I & II (NACLAA)
- Occupational Health & Safety
- Python Back End Web Development
- Residential Interiors
- Renewable Energy Technologies
- Social Media
- Soil Science
- UX / UI Design
- Water Resource Management
- Wind Energy Development and Design

=== Citation Programs ===
- Applied Geostatistics
- Global Leadership (Advanced Citation)
- Supervisory Development

=== Series ===
- Analytics for Business
- Business Strategy
- Change Management
- Editing & Proofreading
- Information Technology for Business Improvement
- Managing Organizational Risk
- Planning for Diverse Environments
- Project Management
- Renewable Energy Essentials
- Solar Energy Development and Design
- Workplace Wellness Leadership

=== Designations ===
- Certified Administrative Professional
- Certified in Management
- Risk and Insurance Management (CRM)

=== Microcredentials ===
- Blockchain Fundamentals
- Construction Estimating & Planning
- Data Privacy and Security
- Digital Marketing for Business
- Entrepreneurship and New Venture Development
- Technology in Logistics and Distribution Management

=== Course Collections ===
- Business Seminars
- Environmental Sciences
- OHS Emerging Issues
- Professional Education for Executives
- Sign Language
- SkillUp@UA (On-demand courses)
- Spanish
- Technology & Innovation
- Visual Arts
- World Languages
- Writing & Communications

== English Language School ==
The English Language School is a unit that houses several English-language related programs. The English Language School helps international students meet the English language requirements for undergraduate admission at the University of Alberta.
