= Vivian Mushahwar =

American researcher and professor

- فيفيان مشحور
- Born: Jerusalem

Academic background
- Education: BSc, Electrical Engineering, 1991, Brigham Young University; PhD, Bioengineering, 1996, University of Utah

Academic work
- Institutions: University of Alberta

Vivian K. Mushahwar FCAHS (Arabic: فيفيان مشحور) is a Palestinian-Canadian biomedical engineer. She is a Canada Research Chair in Functional Restoration at the University of Alberta, Fellow of the Canadian Academy of Health Sciences and Fellow of the American Institute for Medical and Biological Engineering.

== Early life and education ==
Mushahwar was born in Jerusalem to a young Palestinian couple as the second of three children. She enrolled at Brigham Young University for her Bachelor of Science degree in electrical engineering before completing her PhD at the University of Utah. During her undergraduate career, Mushahwar focused on learning math, physics and computer programming but she chose to pursue human application as a career after realizing that her skills can benefit many people who are living with a spinal cord injury in areas of political conflict and war. As such, Mushahwar completed postdoctoral work in rehabilitative medicine at Emory University and neuroscience at the University of Alberta (U of A).

== Career ==
Following her postdoctoral fellowship, Mushahwar remained at the University of Alberta due to funding and the interdisciplinary interaction between engineering and neuroscience. Upon joining the institution as a faculty member, she oversaw two laboratories; the Spinal Cord Injury & Neuroprostheses and Human Rehabilitation Engineering to restore function to limbs following spinal cord injuries. During her early tenure at U of A, Mushahwar co-developed a device that increases weak nerve signals on the spinal cord to potentially allow paraplegics to walk. She eventually received funding from the Alberta Heritage Foundation for Medical Research to support her research for five years as she moved from animals to human subjects. The aim of the device was to allow for electronic stimulation of damaged nerves in the spinal cord to produce muscular movement. Mushahwar later released a prototype of Smart-e-Pants, a custom electric underwear that helps prevent pressure ulcers or bedsores, and Smart On-going Circulatory Compressions to prevent deep vein thrombosis and circulatory problems.

In 2013, Mushahwar co-established a Centre for Neural Interfaces and Rehabilitation Neuroscience to assist her research in mobility issues. She was also appointed director of the Sensory Motor Adaptive Rehabilitation Technology (SMART) Network to oversee the development of smart medical devices and rehabilitative interventions to improve quality the functionality for people with neural injuries and diseases. As a result of her research and academic accomplishments, Mushahwar was also appointed a special advisor in Functional Electrical Stimulation Technologies at Glenrose Rehabilitation Hospital.

In October 2018, Mushahwar was appointed a Canada Research Chair in Functional Restoration to support her research in restoring mobility for Canadians living with spinal cord injury. While serving in this new role, she was also recognized as a Killam Professor. The following academic year, Mushahwar was elected a Fellow of the Canadian Academy of Health Sciences for "pioneer[ing] the development of micro-implants for stimulating the spinal cord to restore standing and walking after paralysis."
