= University of Alberta =

Public research university in Edmonton, Canada

Coordinates: 53°31′28″N 113°31′28″W

- Coat of arms
- Latin: Universitas Albertensis
- Other name: Université de l'Alberta (French)
- Motto: Quaecumque vera (Latin)
- Motto in English: "Whatsoever things are true"
- Type: Public university
- Established: 1908; 118 years ago
- Academic affiliations: APRU; U15; WUN
- Endowment: CA$1.7 billion
- Chancellor: Nizar Somji
- President: Bill Flanagan
- Provost: Verna Yiu
- Faculty: 4,004
- Administrative staff: 5,021
- Students: 44,059 (2023-24 fulltime equivalent)
- Undergraduates: 37,735
- Postgraduates: 8,466
- Location: Edmonton, Alberta, Canada
- Campus: Urban
- Colours: Green & Gold
- Nicknames: Golden Bears (men); Pandas (women)
- Sporting affiliations: U Sports – Canada West
- Mascots: GUBA (men); Patches (women)
- Website: ualberta.ca

The University of Alberta (U of A or UAlberta; French: Université de l'Alberta) is a public research university located in Edmonton, Alberta, Canada. It was founded in 1908 by Alexander Cameron Rutherford, the first premier of Alberta, and Henry Marshall Tory, the university's first president. It was enabled through the Post-secondary Learning Act. The university is considered a "comprehensive academic and research university" (CARU), which means that it offers a range of academic and professional programs that generally lead to undergraduate and graduate level credentials.

The university comprises four campuses in Edmonton, an Augustana Campus in Camrose, and a staff centre in downtown Calgary. The original north campus consists of 150 buildings covering 50 city blocks on the south rim of the North Saskatchewan River valley, across and west from downtown Edmonton. About 37,000 students from Canada and 150 other countries participate in 400 programs in 18 faculties.

The university is a major economic driver for Alberta. In 2022, it contributed $19.4 billion to Alberta's economy, or over five per cent of that year's gross domestic product. The University of Alberta has produced over 260,000 graduates; awards received by alumni and faculty members include three Nobel Prizes and 72 Rhodes Scholarships.

== History ==
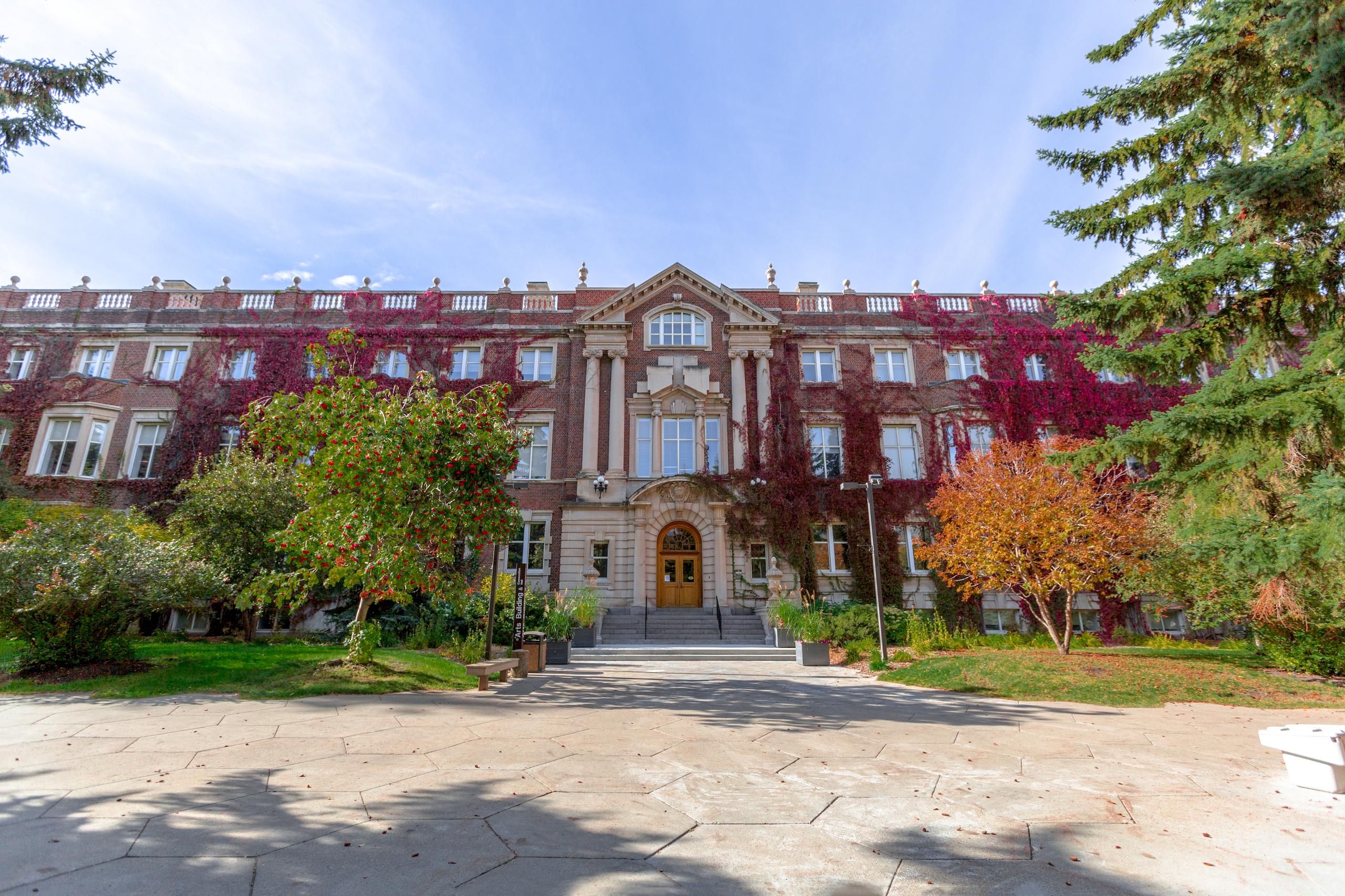
Old Arts Building, University of Alberta campus, designed by Percy Erskine Nobbs and Frank Darling 1909–10.

The university was chartered in 1906 in Edmonton, Alberta as a single, public provincial university through the University Act, passed during the first session of the then-new Legislative Assembly, with Premier Alexander C. Rutherford as the legislation's sponsor. The university was modelled on the American state university, with an emphasis on extension work and applied research. The governance was modelled on Ontario's University of Toronto Act of 1906, with a bicameral system consisting of a senate (faculty) responsible for academic policy, and a board of governors (citizens) controlling financial policy and having formal authority in all other matters. The president, appointed by the board, was to provide a link between the two bodies and perform institutional leadership.

=== Establishment in Edmonton ===
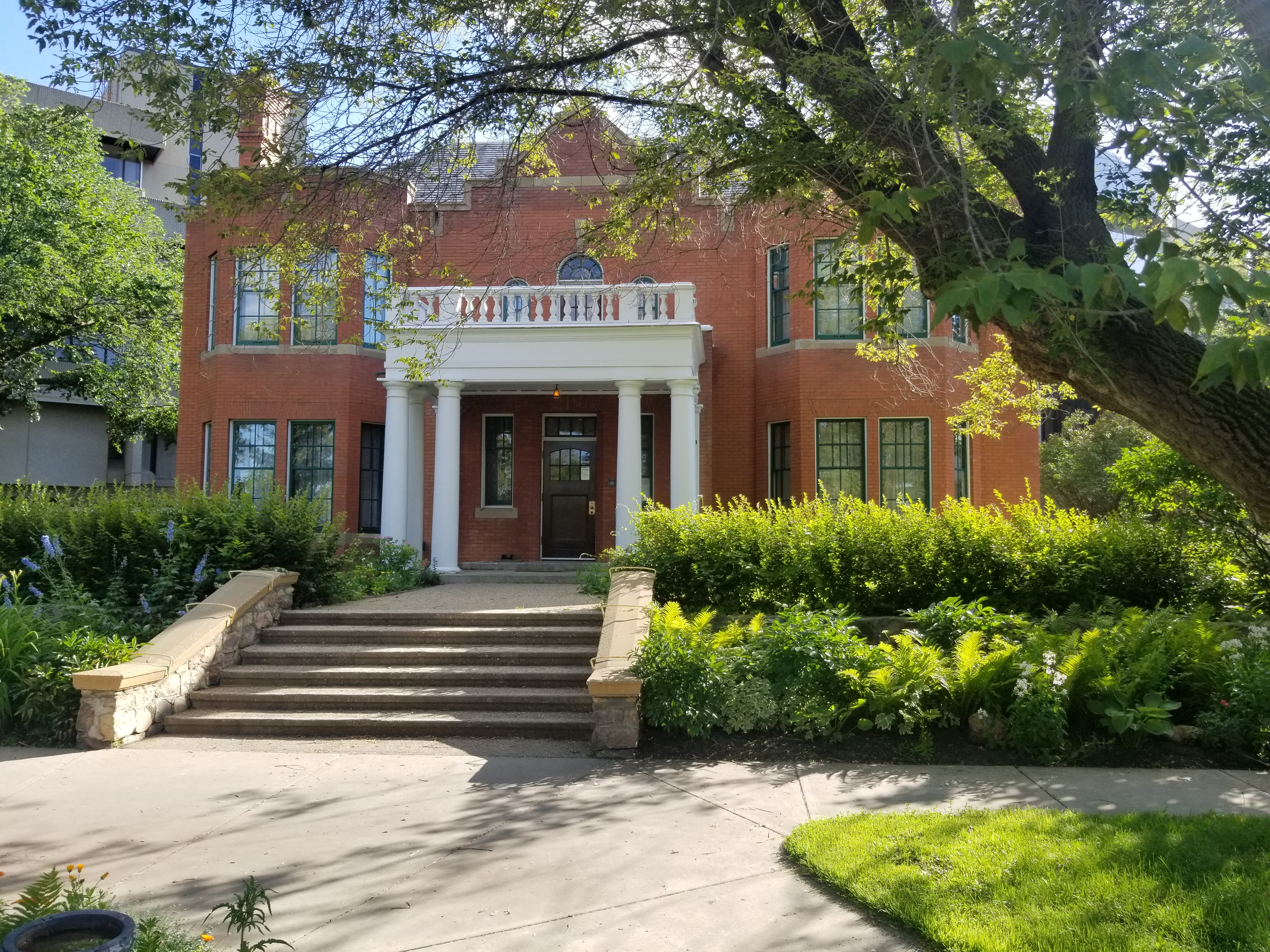
Rutherford House, home of the University of Alberta's founder Alexander Cameron Rutherford, on the northeast corner of the University of Alberta campus.

Heated wrangling took place between the cities of Calgary and Edmonton over the location of the provincial capital and of the university. It was stated that the capital would be north of the North Saskatchewan River and that the university would be in a city south of it. The city of Edmonton became the capital and the then-separate city of Strathcona on the south bank of the river, where Premier Alexander Rutherford lived, was granted the university. When the two cities were amalgamated in 1912, Edmonton became both the political and academic capital.

With Henry Marshall Tory as its first president, the University of Alberta started operation in 1908. Forty-five students attended classes in English, mathematics and modern languages, on the top floor of the Queen Alexandra Elementary School in Strathcona while the first campus building, Athabasca Hall, was under construction. In a letter to Rutherford in early 1906, while he was in the process of setting up McGill University College in Vancouver, Tory wrote, "If you take any steps in the direction of a working University and wish to avoid the mistakes of the past, mistakes which have fearfully handicapped other institutions, you should start on a teaching basis."

Of the 45 students in the university's first cohort in 1908, seven were women. These original seven formed a type of sorority, called Seven Independent Spinsters, or S.I.S., with the intention of supporting the women's social and academic needs. In 1909, the group changed its name to the Wuaneita Club, and then to the Wuaneita Society in 1910. All female students at the university were initiated into the Society every fall. The group heavily appropriated from Cree culture: the name Wuaneita is a rough equivalent to the Cree word meaning "kind-hearted"; their initiation ceremonies featured costumes with feathers and headdresses; the society president was called the "Big Chief": and the motto of the group was "payuk uche kukeyow, mena kukeyow uche payuk,” a rough translation into Cree of "all for one, one for all" that is still engraved above the outer doors of Pembina Hall on main campus. For much of the Wuaneita Society's existence, as they were coopting First Nations traditions and ceremonies, the Potlatch ban was in effect in Canada. The group wound down in 1973 once the population of female students on campus had outgrown the need for a supportive society.

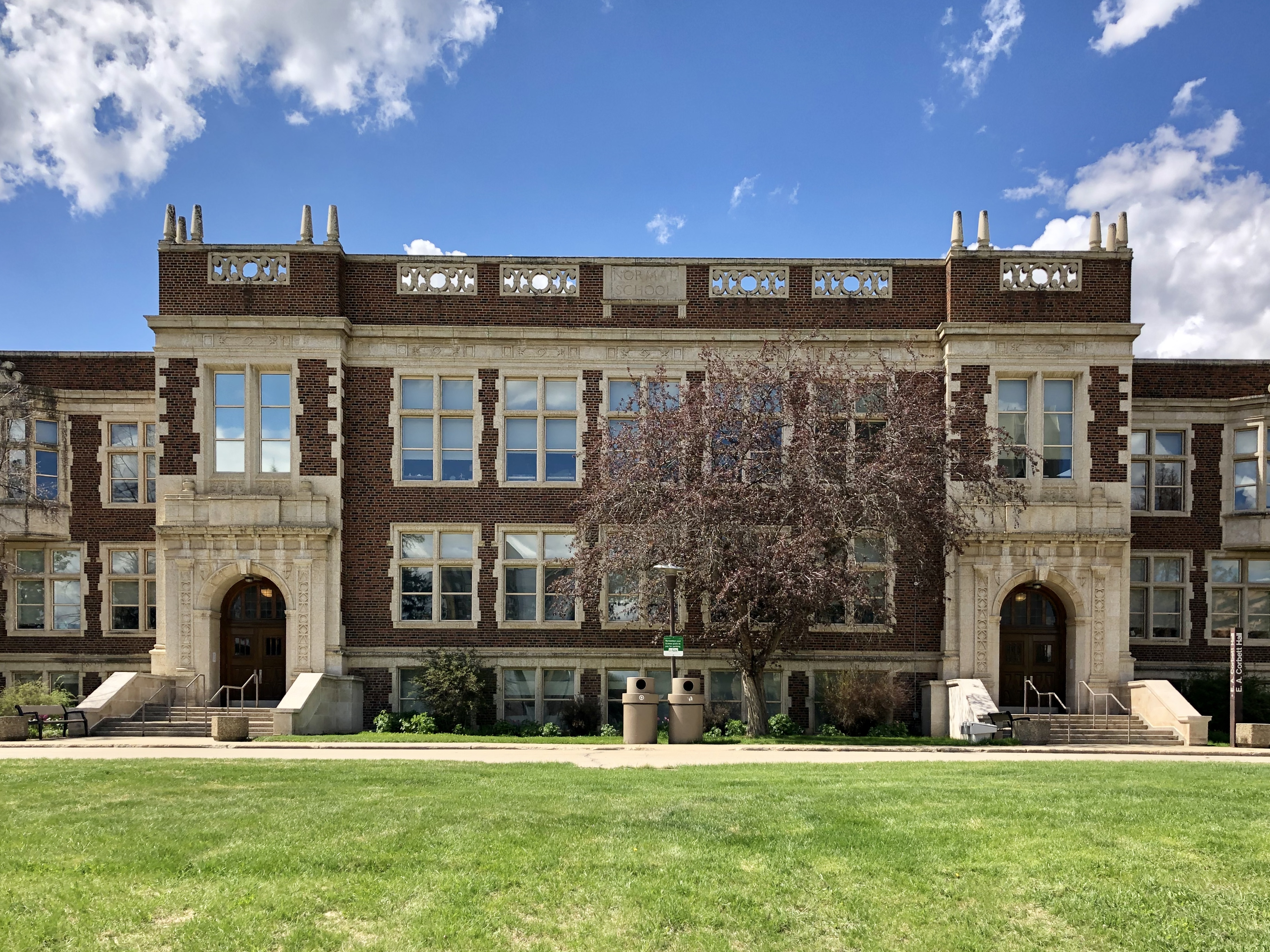
Corbett Hall

Under Tory's guidance, the early years were marked by recruitment of professors and construction of the first campus buildings. Today, he has a building named after him that houses classes of all types. Among the first professors Tory hired was William Muir Edwards, the second child of women's rights activist Henrietta Edwards.

Percy Erskine Nobbs & Frank Darling designed the master plan for the University of Alberta in 1909–10. Nobbs designed the Arts Building (1914–15), laboratories and Power House (1914). With Cecil S. Burgess, Nobbs designed the Provincial College of Medicine (1920–21). Architect Herbert Alton Magoon designed several buildings on campus, including St. Stephen's Methodist College (1910) and the residence for professor Rupert C. Lodge (1913). The University of Alberta awarded its first degrees in 1912, the same year it established the Department of Extension. The Faculty of Medicine was established the following year, and the Faculty of Agriculture began in 1915.

But along with these early milestones came the First World War and the global influenza pandemic of 1918, whose toll on the university resulted in a two-month suspension of classes in the fall of 1918. The university organized the recruitment of staff and students for XI Canadian Field Ambulance (Western Universities) in early 1916, and soon afterward it raised 'C' Company of the 196th (Western Universities) Battalion. Both of these units were organized by a committee composed of representatives from the University of British Columbia, University of Alberta, University of Saskatchewan, and University of Manitoba, with each institution encouraging their staff and students to volunteer. The University of Alberta's recruits for XI Canadian Field Ambulance were billeted in Athabasca Hall before departing for Winnipeg in March 1916, while the men of C Company stayed in Assiniboia Hall until June of that same year. Between 1914 and 1918, the number of students and staff serving overseas (in a number of different units) was greater than the number of students registered in each academic year. Roughly half of the university's staff and students were serving overseas by 1916. 82 staff and students from the University of Alberta died during their service in the First World War, and hundreds more were wounded.

Despite these setbacks, the university continued to grow. By 1920, it had six faculties (Arts and Sciences, Applied Science, Agriculture, Medicine, Dentistry, and Law) and two schools (Pharmacy and Accountancy). It awarded a range of degrees: Bachelor of Arts (BA), Bachelor of Science (BSc), Bachelor of Science in Agriculture (BSA), Bachelor of Laws (LLB), Bachelor of Pharmacy (PhmB), Bachelor of Divinity (BD), Master of Arts (MA), Master of Science (MSc), and Doctor of Laws (LLD). There were 851 male students and 251 female students, and 171 academic staff, including 14 women.

=== Campus expansion ===
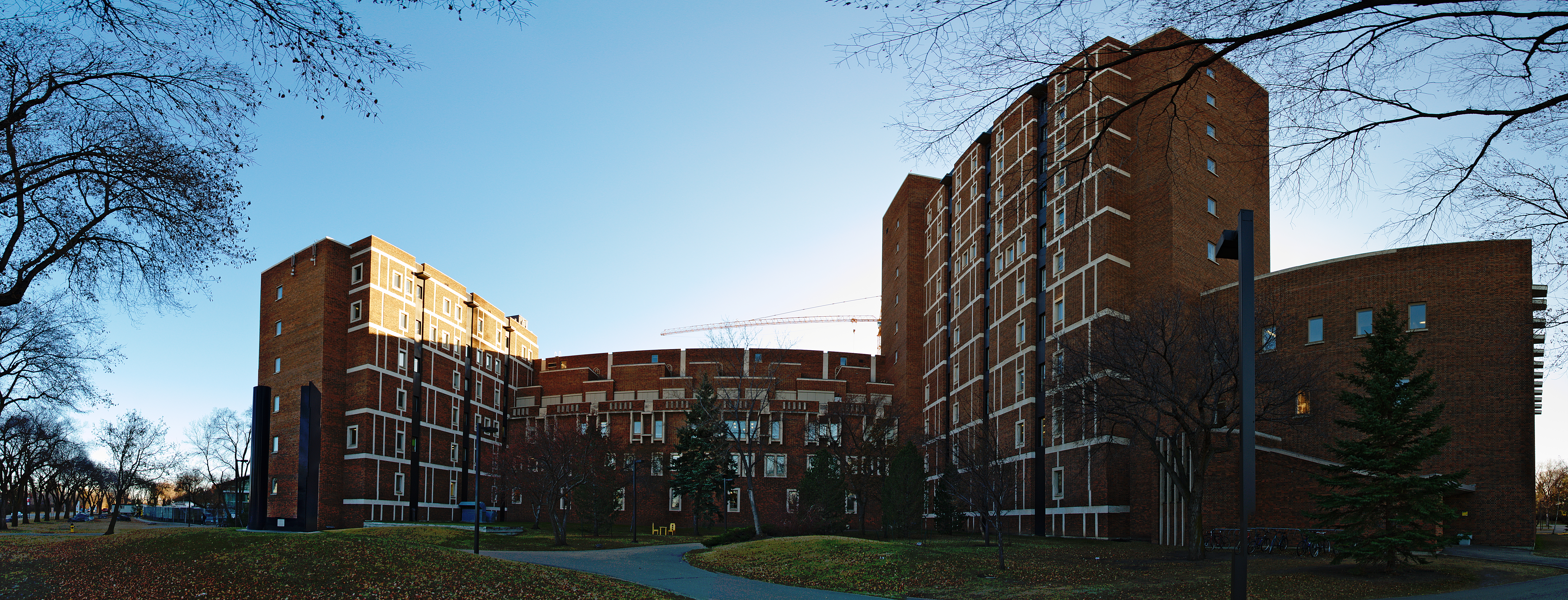
Biological Sciences Building at the University of Alberta

The Breton Soil Plots were established at the faculty of agriculture from 1929 – present to provide agricultural research on fertilization, usage, crop rotations and farming practices on Gray-Luvisolic soils (Gray-Wooded), which cover many regions in western Canada.

The University of Alberta spearheaded an extraordinary rate of volunteerism in the province of Alberta to the First World War, especially from its medical faculty. Experience gained was used by returning veterans to rapidly mature the young Faculty of Medicine. The War Memorial Committee commissioned a War Memorial Pipe Organ to be erected by the Casavant Frères in U of A Convocation Hall in 1925 in memory of 80 University of Alberta comrades who gave up their lives during the Great War.

In the early part of the 20th century, professional education expanded beyond the traditional fields of theology, law and medicine. Graduate training based on the German-inspired American model of specialized course work and the completion of a research thesis was introduced. In 1929, the university established a College of Education. This period of growth was to be short-lived, though, as the Great Depression and the Second World War curtailed enrolment and expansion until 1945. The university also gained new public powers. In 1928, the university's senate was granted the power to oversee and appoint half of the Alberta Eugenics Board, charged with recommending individuals for sterilization.

Spurred by postwar growth in the student population and the discovery of oil in Leduc in 1947, the University of Alberta underwent expansion through the 1950s that continued through the 1960s as the baby-boom generation swelled the enrolment ranks. These two decades also saw expansion of campus buildings, including new buildings for the faculties of physical education and education, and the Cameron Library. The University of Alberta Press, concentrating on western Canadian history, general science and ecology, was founded in 1969.

The policy of university education initiated in the 1960s responded to population pressure and the belief that higher education was a key to social justice and economic productivity for individuals and for society. In addition, the single-university policy in the West was changed as existing colleges of the provincial universities gained autonomy as universities. On September 19, 1960, the university opened a new 130-hectare campus in Calgary. By 1966, the University of Calgary had been established as an autonomous institution.

From the mid-1970s to the late 1980s, the university enjoyed sustained growth. In 1970, the Collège Saint-Jean, now known as Campus Saint-Jean, began offering French-language instruction in arts, science and education. In 1984, the School of Native Studies was established. Buildings that had been started in the 1960s, such as Biological Sciences, its biotron facility, and the Central Academic Building, were completed in the early 1970s. Extensive renovations restored the venerable Arts Building, as well as the Athabasca and Pembina halls. New buildings completed in the early 1980s included the Business Building and the first phase of the Walter C. Mackenzie Health Sciences Centre. Another new building, the distinctive Universiade Pavilion (nicknamed the "Butterdome"), was completed as part of the university's preparations to host the World University Games in 1983, the first time the event was held in North America.

=== Modern challenges ===
The 1990s were a time of financial constraint as the Alberta government made budgetary cutbacks. However, there was a time in which the university benefited from philanthropic support. The $11 million Timms Centre for the Arts, which began construction in 1993, was made possible by a large donation from its namesake, Albert Timms. In 1998, Gladys Young's $3.5-million donation to the university undergraduate scholarship fund in memory of Roland Young, who graduated from the U of A in 1928, was the largest private donation for undergraduate scholarships in the university's history.

The early 2000s brought substantial funding increases. High energy prices drove Alberta's energy boom resulting in multibillion-dollar government surpluses and the subsequent creation of a $4.5 billion provincial post-secondary educational endowment. In 2005, the university hired Indira Samarasekera as its 12th president, embarking on an ambitious plan to establish itself as one of the world's top public research universities. These plans were hampered by the 2008 economic downturn, and by late March 2008, the university's endowment had shrunk by more than $100 million, almost 14 per cent of its value. The university predicted a $59-million budget shortfall in 2009 before provincial cuts brought that figure to $79 million. To close the budgetary gap, the university increased non-instructional fees by $290 per year laid off teaching and support staff, and even eliminated phones in some departments (such as English and Film Studies).

The 2013 Alberta Budget cut provincial post-secondary grants by $147 million, including a 7.2 per cent cut to the university's base operating grant. The university is covering its resulting shortfall by reducing total spending in 2013 by $28 million, then cutting an additional $56 million to balance its budget by the spring of 2015.

The 2015 Alberta Budget released in October 2015 restored a 1.4 per cent cut to the U of A's operational funding, and provided for an additional two per cent increase in the 2015-16 fiscal year. The budget also included a two-year tuition freeze. October also saw the launch of an institutional strategic planning process intended to prompt discussion and gather feedback on the university's strategic priorities, with the goal of assuming a national leadership role in post-secondary education.

The 2019 Alberta Budget released in October 2019 reduced grants to the provincial post-secondary sector, including a $44-million reduction for the U of A and an additional freeze of $35 million allocated for infrastructure. In early 2020, amid the COVID-19 pandemic in Canada, the United Conservative Party announced an additional $110-million cut to funding for the U of A. While outgoing University President David H. Turpin announced that the cuts would necessitate 400 job losses by March 31 and more than 600 additional positions would need to be eliminated in 2020–2021, incoming University President Bill Flanagan began campus discussions about how to manage the cuts, including reducing the number of faculties and departments, and streamlining administration staffing.

In April 2026, two former students and an associate professor launched a charter challenge against the University for directing the Edmonton Police Service to forcibly dismantle a Palestine solidarity encampment. The lawsuit argues that the University breached multiple charter rights, including freedom of expression, assembly and association.

== Academics ==
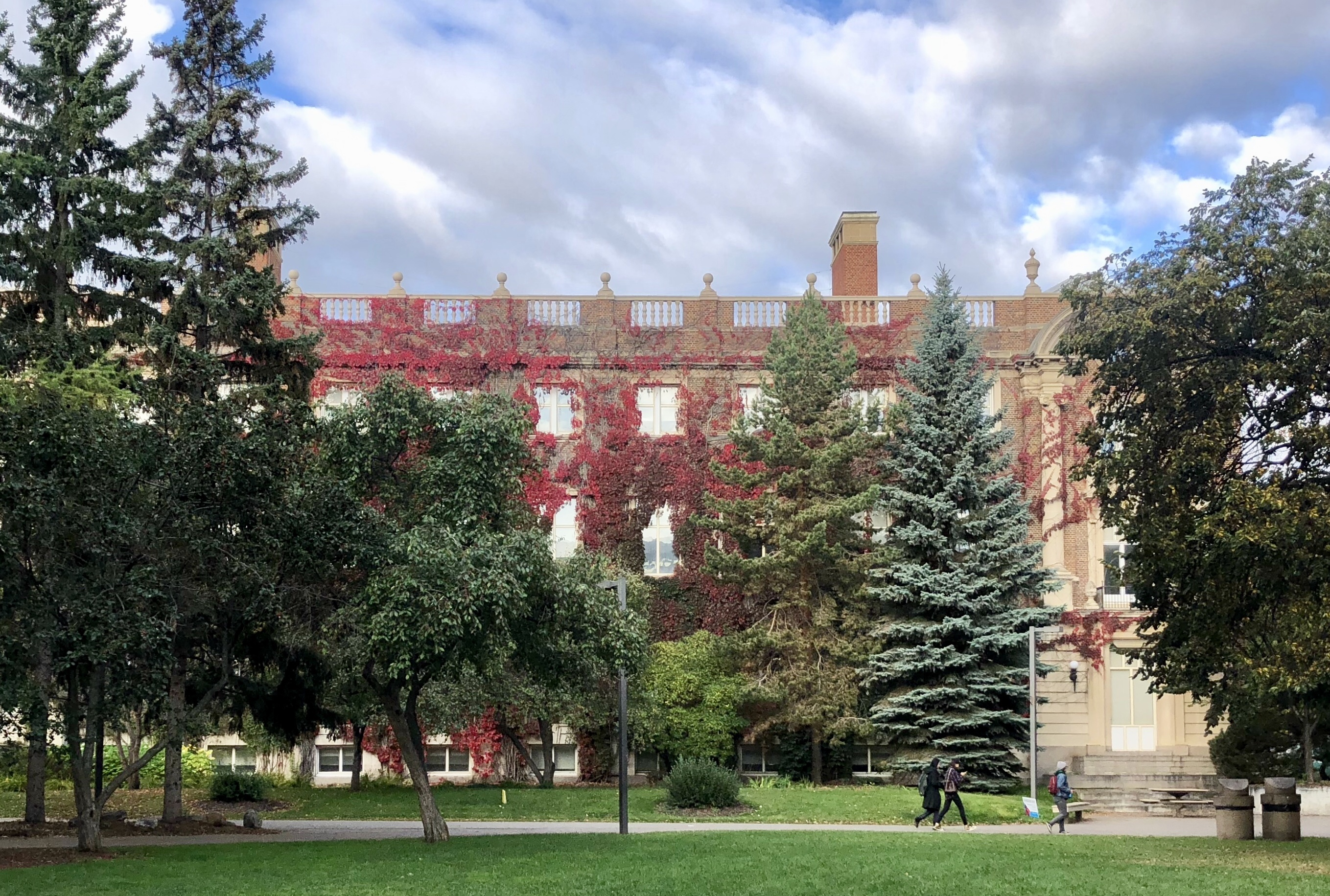
Arts Building

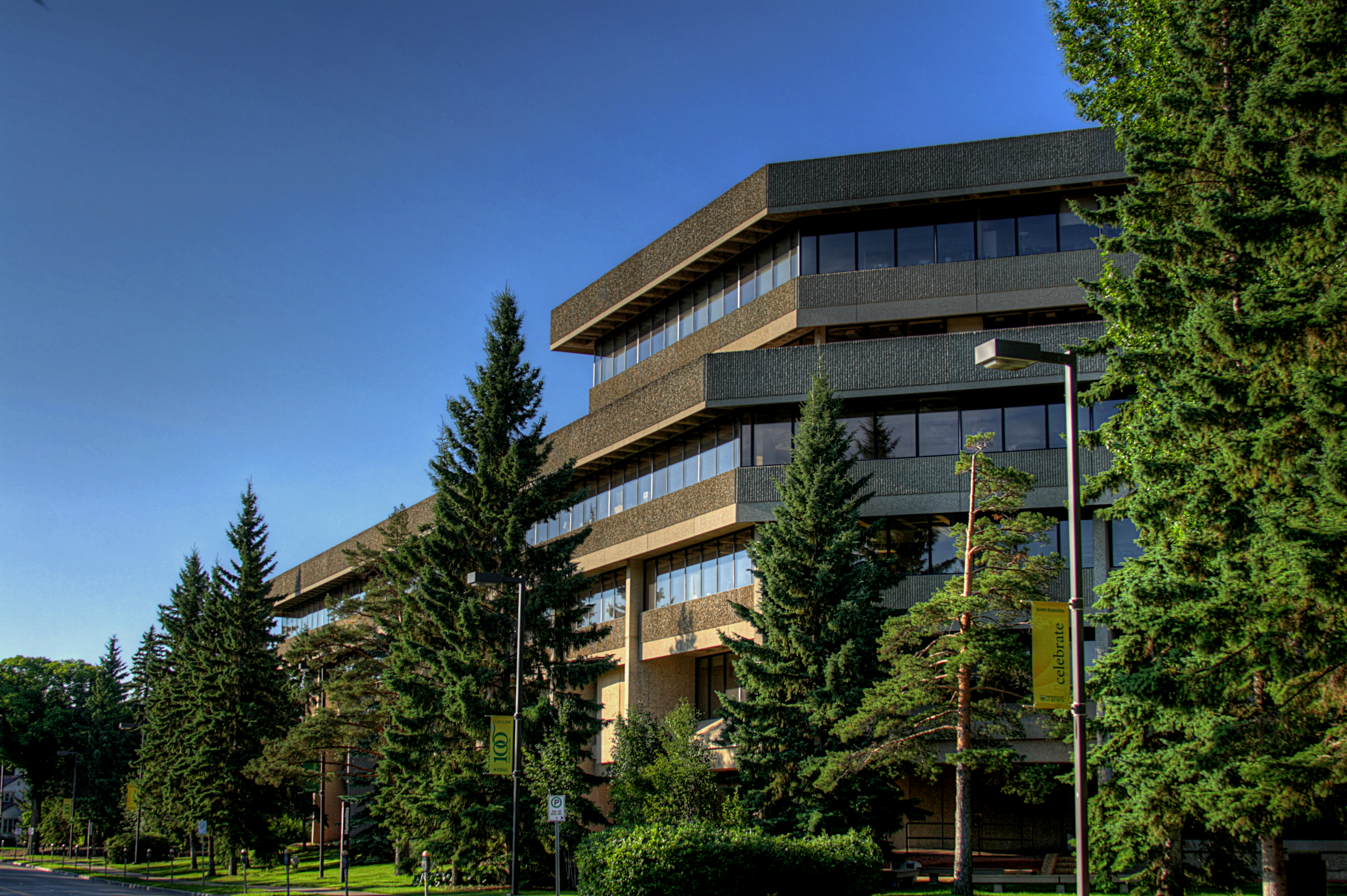
The Humanities Centre

The U of A has about 39,300 students, including 7,700 graduate students and 7,800 international students representing 151 countries. The university has 3,620 academic staff along with 15,380 support and trust staff. University professors have won more 3M Teaching Fellowships (Canada's top award for undergraduate teaching excellence) than any other Canadian university, 41 awards since 1986. The university offers post-secondary education in about 388 undergraduate and 500 graduate programs. Tuition and fees for both fall and winter semesters are slightly more than $5,000 for a typical undergraduate arts student, although they vary widely by program. The University of Alberta switched from a 9-point grading scale to the more common 4-point grading scale in September 2003. Seventy-two Rhodes Scholars have come from the University of Alberta. The University of Alberta also holds 2,599 Academic All-Canadians, the most of any University in Canada.

=== Faculties and colleges ===
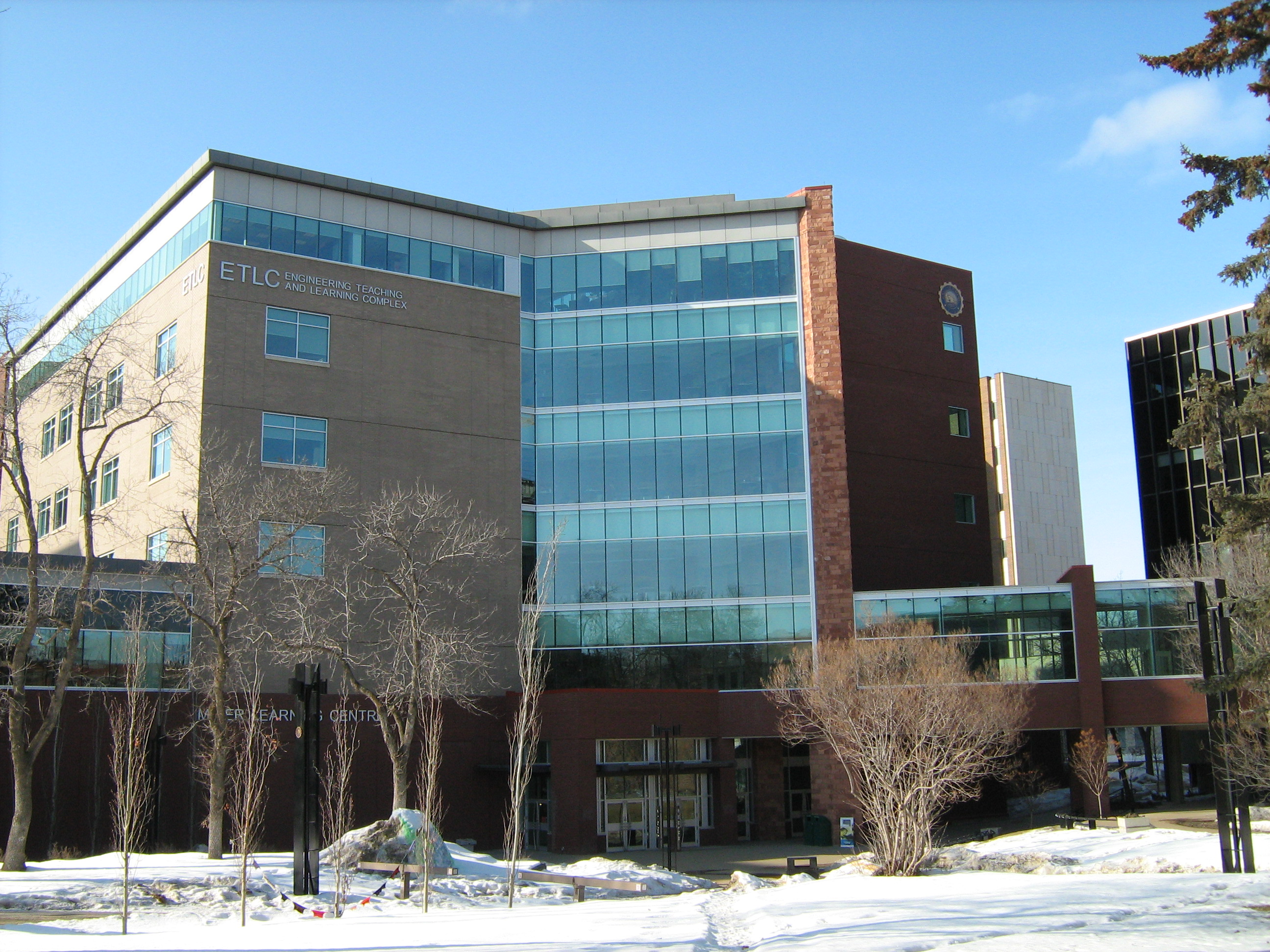
The Engineering Teaching and Learning Complex (ETLC)

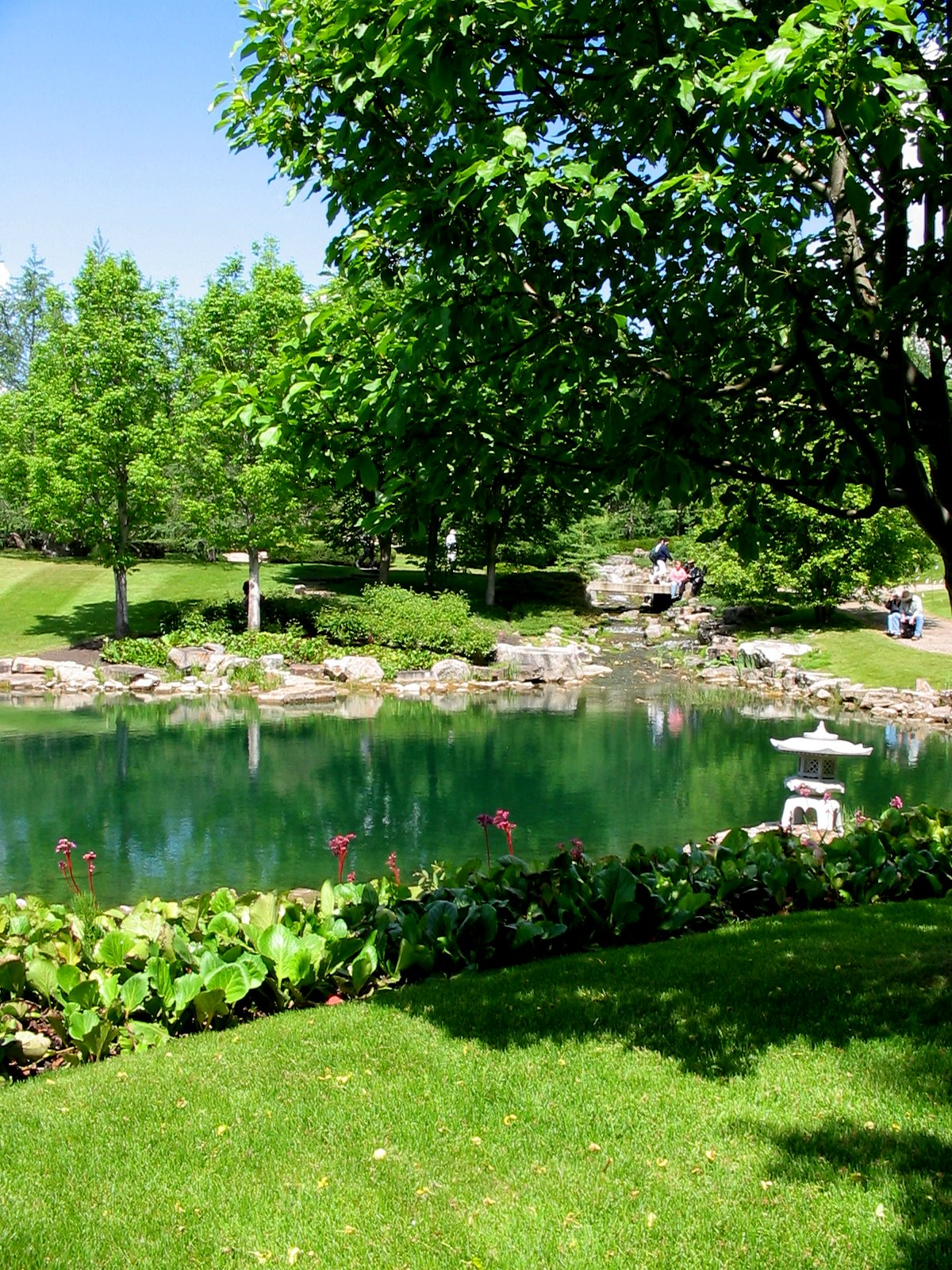
University of Alberta Botanic Garden

The university has 18 faculties:

- Faculty of Agricultural, Life and Environmental Sciences focuses on natural, biological, and human resources. The faculty is home to the University of Alberta Botanic Garden in Devon, Alberta. The garden runs a series of winter hardiness trials on trees, shrubs, herbs, annuals and bulbs. The garden collection consists of Primula, Meconopsis, Allium Rosa (shrub), alpines, and herbs and plants traditionally used by Aboriginal Peoples. There is a microfungus collection and a herbarium that contains more than 4,800 livery genotypic filamentous fungi.
- Alberta School of Business offers MBA, BCom, PhD, ExecEd, Exec MBA, and Master of Financial Management degrees. The business school was the first in Canada to be accredited by the Association to Advance Collegiate Schools of Business, in 1968. and maintained its accreditation in 2012 making it the longest accredited business school in Canada.
- Faculty of Arts is home to a spectrum of arts programs and departments, from Anthropology and Community Service Learning to History and Women's Studies.
- Augustana Campus is located in a satellite campus in Camrose, Alberta. It comprises the departments of Fine Arts, Humanities, Physical Education, Science, and Social Sciences.
- Campus Saint-Jean is the U of A’s francophone faculty with programs in the Arts, Humanities, Social Sciences, Business, Science, Education, Nursing, and Engineering. Programs range from language learning to college and undergraduate programs to graduate programs all the way up to the doctoral level.
- Faculty of Education offers undergraduate and graduate degrees in elementary and secondary education, or a combined program. The School of Library and Information Studies is also a part of this Faculty.
- Faculty of Engineering offers undergraduate degrees in five engineering departments. Students can choose to specialize in the following disciplines: Chemical Engineering, Civil Engineering, Computer Engineering, Electrical Engineering, Engineering Physics, Materials Engineering, Mechanical Engineering, Mechatronics Engineering, Mining Engineering and Petroleum Engineering.
- Faculty of Extension offers more than 300 courses in over 30 programs focusing on lifelong Continuing Education and Professional Development. Among the faculty's contributions to Alberta's educational and cultural life are the creation of the CKUA public radio station in 1927 and the Banff School of Fine Arts in 1933.
- Faculty of Graduate Studies and Research maintains more than 170 programs in graduate studies.
- Faculty of Kinesiology, Sport, and Recreation focuses on the studies of human movement through sport science, kinesiology, physical education, physical activity and health, and tourism studies. The Faculty of Kinesiology, Sport, and Recreation offers four undergraduate programs: Bachelor of Arts in Recreation, Sport and Tourism; Bachelor of Kinesiology; Bachelor of Kinesiology/Bachelor of Education (five-year combined degree offered in conjunction with the Faculty of Education); and Bachelor of Science in kinesiology.
- Faculty of Law is the oldest law school in Western Canada. It is home to interdisciplinary institutes of constitutional studies, health law, science policy and law reform in Alberta.
- Faculty of Medicine & Dentistry has 20 departments, seven divisions, eight research groups, and 31 centres and institutes. The faculty is internationally known for research in diabetes, obesity, virology, cardiology, cancer and spinal injury rehabilitation.
- Faculty of Native Studies is Canada's only stand-alone faculty of native studies. The faculty began offering a master's program in the 2012–13 academic year.
- Faculty of Nursing is one of Canada's largest nursing faculties, and was the first in Canada to offer a fully funded PhD program.
- Faculty of Pharmacy and Pharmaceutical Sciences is one of Canada's largest and finest pharmacy faculties. Its students excel nationally, achieving the highest combined score on the Pharmacy Examining Board of Canada exam in 2009, 2010 and 2012.
- Faculty of Rehabilitation Medicine is North America's only stand-alone faculty dedicated to rehabilitation science, physical therapy, occupational therapy and speech-language pathology. The faculty is a research leader in musculoskeletal health, spinal cord injuries, seniors' health, and use of communication technologies to support local community care.
- School of Public Health was established in March 2006 as Canada's first stand-alone faculty with a sole focus on public health. In October 2012, it became the only school in Canada and only the second outside the United States to be accredited by the U.S. Council on Education for Public Health.
- Faculty of Science is made up of seven departments (Biological Sciences, Chemistry, Computing Science, Earth and Atmospheric Sciences, Mathematical and Statistical Sciences, Physics, and Psychology.) The faculty includes 6 E.W.R. Steacie Memorial Fellowship winners, 16 winners of Rutherford Awards for Excellence in Undergraduate Teaching, 26 Canada Research Chairs, 5 iCORE Chairs, 3 NSERC Chairs, 2 Alberta Ingenuity Centres of Excellence, and 10 members of the Royal Society of Canada. It has more than 70 Bachelor of Science (BSc) programs in 39 subject areas.

The university has two affiliated colleges:

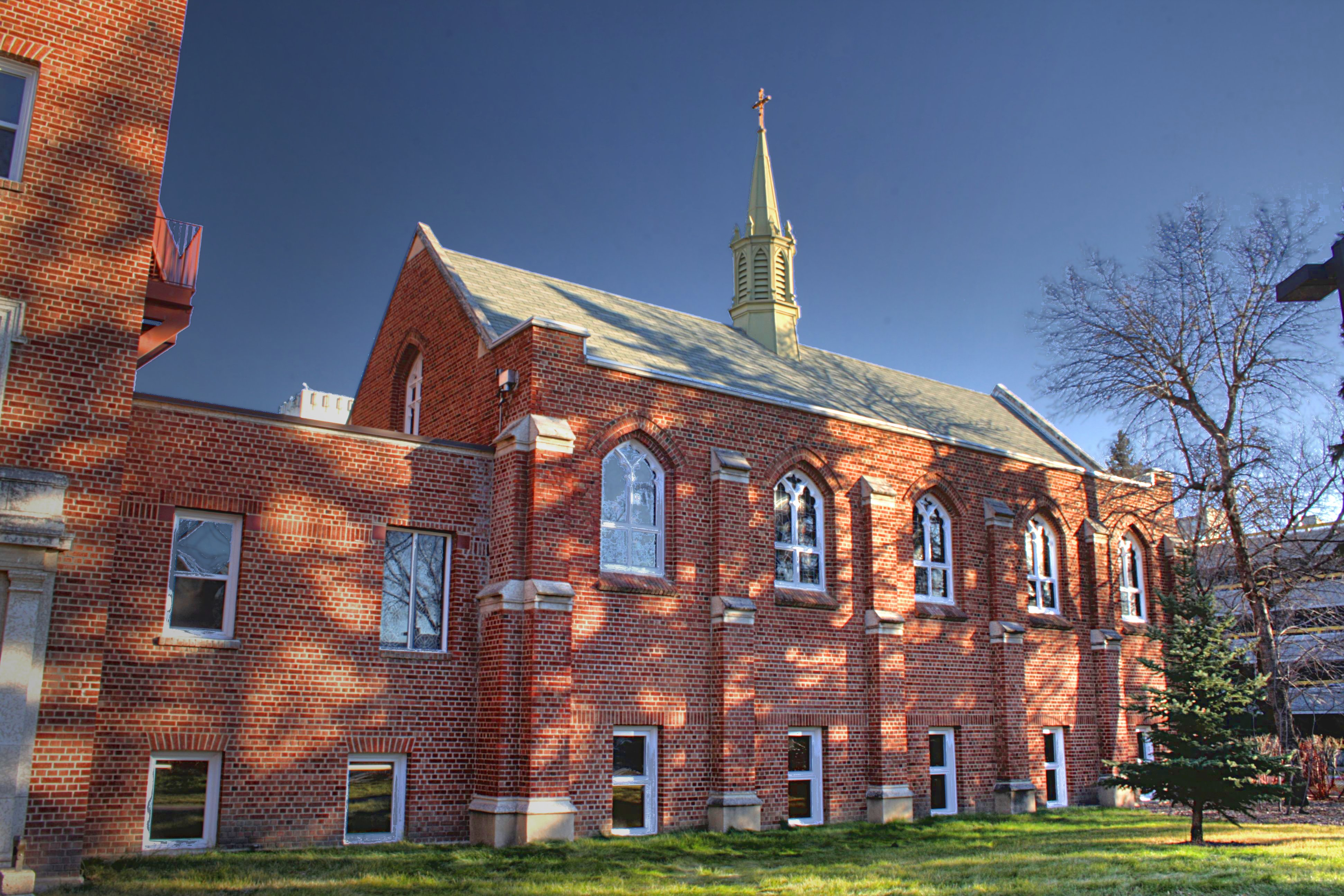
The chapel of St. Joseph's College

- St. Joseph's College offers undergraduate courses in applied ethics, philosophy, religious education and theology, for credit in degree programs with arts options. The college also offers specific courses for education students intending to teach within Alberta's Catholic school system.
- St. Stephen's College offers graduate degree, diploma and certificate programs in theological studies, with courses designed to allow distance learning. It was originally a training centre for Protestant ministers.

=== Academic restructuring model ===
The University of Alberta made the decision to academically restructure its faculties in response to a reduction in its provincial operating grant, which would require the university to reduce expenses by $120 million in the next three years. Three restructuring models were proposed before the university's Board of Governors approved the academic restructuring plans on December 11, 2020. This restructuring model will be effective as of July 1, 2021. The remaining faculties (Augustana, Campus Saint-Jean, and Faculty of Native Studies) will remain as stand-alone faculties.

=== Libraries ===
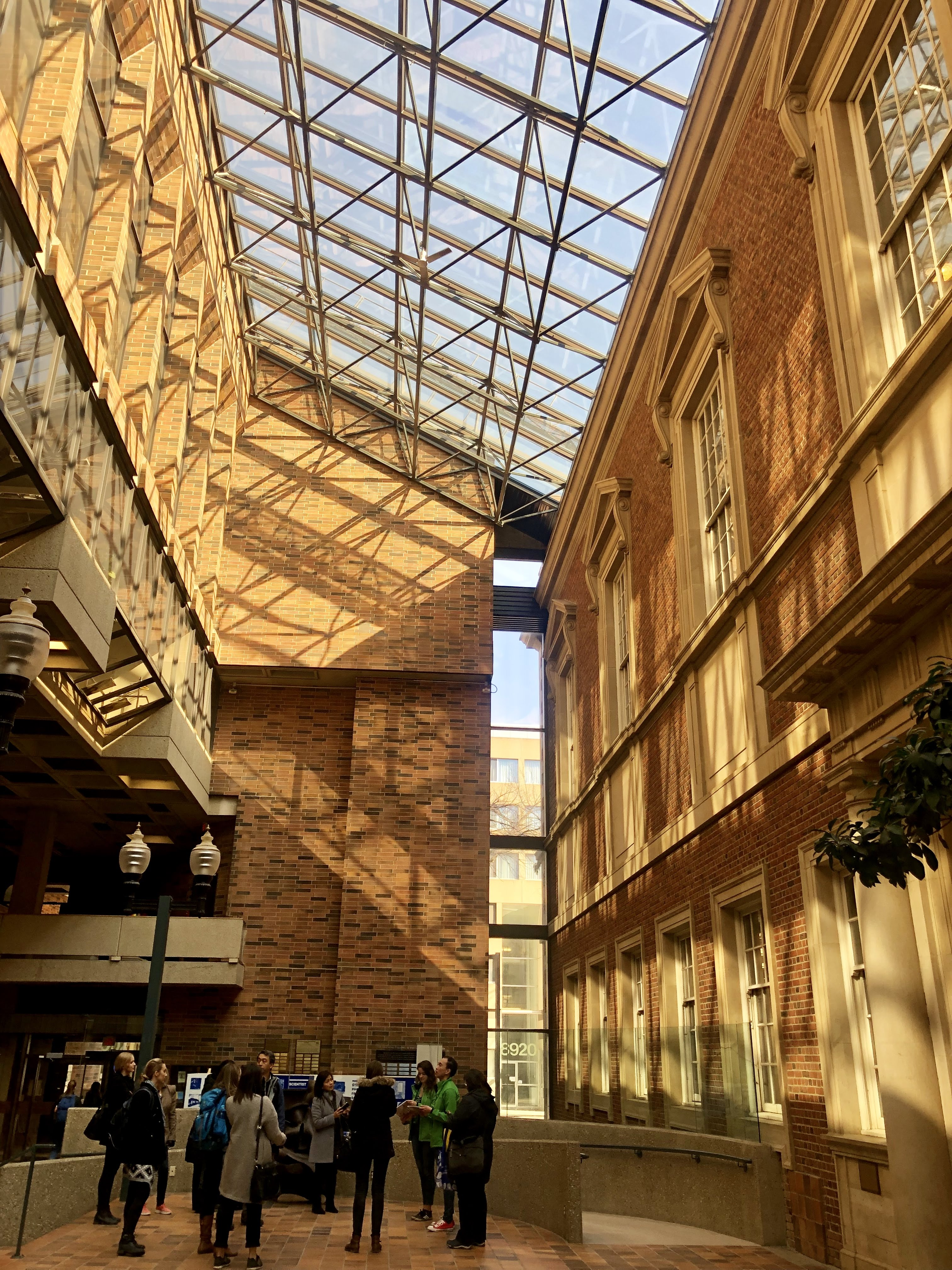
Interior of Rutherford Library galleria

The University of Alberta library system received a tremendous boost with the opening of the Rutherford Library in May 1951. As of 2012, according to the Association of Research Libraries, the library system is rated 11th in North America and is the second-largest, by number of volumes held, among all Canadian universities, after the University of Toronto Library. With over 10.6 million items combined with online access to more than one million electronic books and more than 1,500 electronic databases, the library system ranks first in Canada in terms of the number of volumes per student.

The library system comprises the following specialty libraries:

- Augustana Campus Library
- Bibliothèque Saint-Jean
- Research & Collections Resource Facility (RCRF)
- Cameron Library (Science & Technology)
- Geoffrey & Robyn Sperber Health Sciences Library
- Herbert T. Coutts Library (Education & Physical Education - closed in 2020)
- John A. Weir Memorial Law Library
- John W. Scott Health Sciences Library (closed)
- Rutherford Library (Humanities & Social Sciences)
- St. Joseph's College Library

The university is home to an American Library Association-accredited School of Library and Information Studies, which offers a Master of Library and Information Studies (MLIS) program. The school was housed in Rutherford South, the original four-storey brick, marble and oak main campus library, which opened in 1951. As of 2018, the school has since moved into the Education North building.

== Research ==
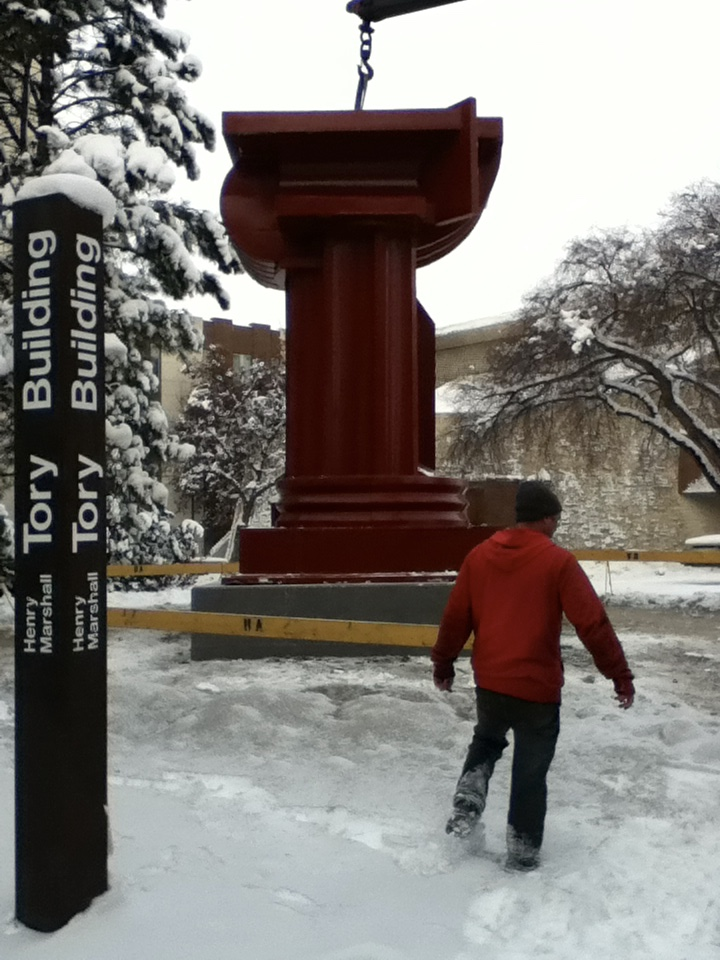
British artist and U of A alumnus Andrew French installs his 1999 sculpture, Pillar, on the University of Alberta campus, November 2012.

The university is a member of the U15 universities and the Worldwide Universities Network, an organization of 19 universities on six continents. In 2018, Research Infosource named the University of Alberta the fifth best research university, with a sponsored research income (external sources of funding) of $513.313 million in 2017. In the same year, the university's faculty averaged a sponsored research income of $242,100, while its graduate students averaged a sponsored research income of $69,400. The university receives nearly $500 million each year for research from external sources. The university houses over 400 distinct research laboratories.

The university's research performance has been noted in several bibliometric university rankings, which uses citation analysis to evaluates the impact a university has on academic publications. In 2019, the Performance Ranking of Scientific Papers for World Universities ranked the university 81st in the world, and fourth in Canada, whereas the University Ranking by Academic Performance 2018–19 rankings placed the university 78th in the world, and fourth in Canada.

The University of Alberta is the national scientific and administrative headquarters for:

- Sustainable Forest Management Network
- Canadian Obesity Network
- Canadian Centre for Ethnomusicology
- Antarctic Institute of Canada

Researchers at the University of Alberta have made discoveries in a number of fields.

=== Arts and humanities research ===
The Faculty of Arts includes eight Canada Research Chairs in fields as diverse as English and Film Studies, Sociology, Philosophy, Art and Design, and History and Classics.

In 2014, the Department of English and Film Studies ranked #22 in the World QS University Rankings by subject.

In 2018, the Faculty of Arts launched several Signature Areas of Research and Creative Collaboration: Digital Synergies; Language, Communication and Culture; Mediating Science and Technology; Shifting Praxis in Artistic Research/Research-Creation; and Stories of Change.

The Faculty houses several research centres and institutes, including:

- Canadian Indigenous Languages and Literacy Development Institute (CILLDI)
- Canadian Institute for Research Computing in the Arts (CIRCA)
- Canadian Institute of Ukrainian Studies (CIUS)
- Canadian Literature Centre/Centre de littérature canadienne
- Institute for Public Economics
- Institute of Prairie and Indigenous Archaeology
- Kule Folklore Centre
- Kule Institute for Advanced Studies (KIAS)
- Parkland Institute
- Prince Takamado Japan Centre for Teaching and Research
- Sound Studies Institute
- Wirth Institute for Austrian and Central European Studies

=== Scientific and medical research ===
- In 1917, physics professor Robert Boyle developed sonar.
- Biochemistry professor and alumnus James Collip played a key role in discovering insulin by refining the pancreatic extract obtained by Frederick Banting, Charles Best and John Macleod so it could be used in humans.
- Chemistry professor Raymond Lemieux was the first to synthesize sucrose. The breakthrough laid the groundwork for new antibiotics and blood reagents, anti-rejection drugs for organ transplants, and better treatments for leukemia and hemophilia.
- In 1956, surgeon John Callaghan performed the first successful open-heart surgery.
- Canada's first organ transplant research group was established at the University of Alberta on April 2, 1970, by the Medical Research Council.
- In 1982, the University of Alberta introduced the Centre for Gerontology, which was renamed the Alberta Centre on Aging in the early 1990s.
- In 1995, engineer Robert Burrell used nanotechnology to develop a form of silver that could be made into a bandage for burns and other wounds. The dressings are used worldwide.
- Medical researchers James Shapiro, Jonathan Lakey and Edmond Ryan developed the Edmonton Protocol, a revolutionary treatment for Type 1 diabetes that enables people with the disease to break their insulin dependence. The first patient was treated in 1999. As of 2006, the project is developed through the Clinical Islet Transplant Program.
- In 2008, medical researcher David Bundle and his colleagues Glen Armstrong and Pavel Kitov made a breakthrough in treating E. coli infection by creating a drug that prevents the E. coli bacterium from making contact with kidney cells.
- In 2013, Michael Houghton, Canada Excellence Research Chair and Li Ka Shing Chair in Virology, showed that a vaccine created from one strain of the hepatitis C virus can be effective against all known strains of the virus. Houghton was also the researcher who originally identified the hepatitis C virus. The discovery paves the way for developing a vaccine to prevent future hepatitis C infections.

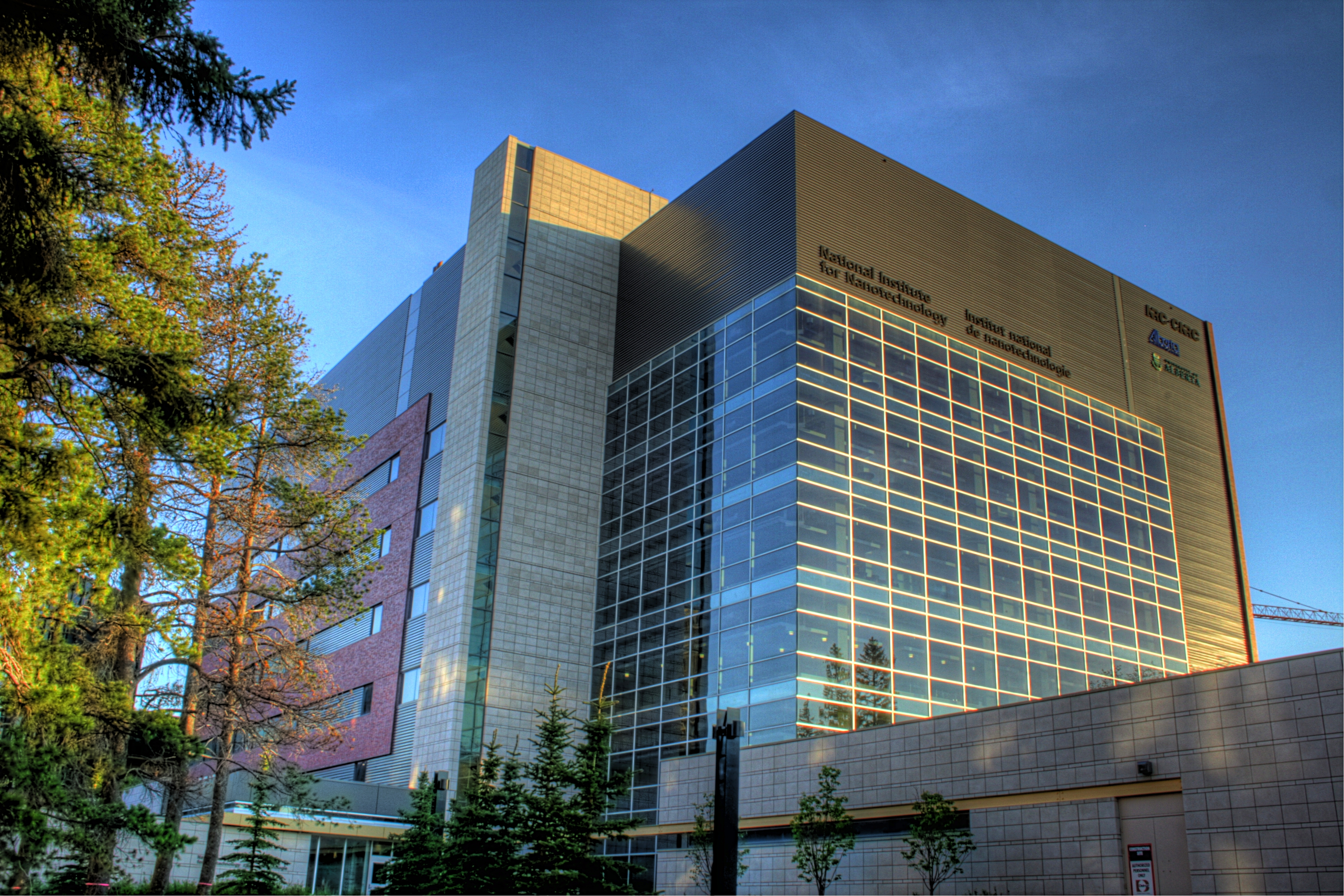
The National Institute for Nanotechnology

=== Nanotechnology research ===
In June 2006, a $120-million building for the National Institute for Nanotechnology (NINT) was opened on campus. NINT occupies five floors of the new building, with the top two floors being reserved by the university for nanotechnology-related research. Some staff members have been jointly recruited by the NRC and the University of Alberta.

=== Arctic research ===
The University of Alberta is home to the Canadian Circumpolar Institute, which supports research into social and environmental issues including climate change, cultural identity and natural resource development.

In 2011, researchers at the University of Alberta linked the reproductive ecology of polar bears in Canada's Hudson Bay with decreasing litter sizes and loss of sea ice.

The university is an active member of the University of the Arctic. UArctic is an international cooperative network based in the Circumpolar Arctic region, consisting of more than 200 universities, colleges, and other organizations with an interest in promoting education and research in the Arctic region.

=== Agriculture ===
Cattle researcher Roy Berg revolutionized the world's beef industry with his innovations in crossbreeding, which led to a 30 to 40 per cent increase in production and contributed to Alberta's world leadership in beef production.

=== Energy, oilsands and environment ===
In the 1920s, engineering professor Karl Clark developed a hot-water extraction process to separate bitumen from oilsands. Geology professor Charlie Stelck's idea to search for oil and gas deposits near ancient coral reefs led to the discovery of oil in Leduc, Alberta, in 1947 and in the Pembina Oil Field in 1953. Today, more than 1,000 researchers at the University of Alberta are working together on oilsands issues and their environmental effects, including carbon capture and storage, tailings-pond reclamation and water preservation.

University of Alberta's SLOWPOKE-2 non-power (reactor power 20 kW thermal) reactor operating licence was renewed and was valid from July 1, 2013, until June 30, 2023. However, the University of Alberta applied for, and was issued a Licence to Decommission its SLOWPOKE-2 Nuclear Research Reactor Facility in 2017. The University of Alberta's SLOWPOKE reactor operated from April 22, 1977, until being dismantled on August 5, 2017, and was used for research and education.

=== Machine learning and artificial intelligence ===
The University of Alberta hosts the Alberta Machine Intelligence Institute, an institute dedicated to machine learning and artificial intelligence. Notable faculty include Osmar R. Zaiane (data mining), and Russell Greiner (health informatics). The computing science department at University of Alberta is ranked #4 in Canada and averaged #2 across Canada and the United States in Artificial Intelligence, based on a meta ranking from multiple sources.

=== Canadian Institute of Ukrainian Studies ===
The university is a leading institution for the study of Ukraine and is home to the Canadian Institute of Ukrainian Studies (CIUS). Peter Savaryn, the university chancellor from 1982 to 1986, helped found the institute. The CIUS received a number of endowments in honour of Ukrainian 14th Waffen Grenadier Division of the SS veterans - Volodymyr Kubijovyc, Roman Kolisnyk, Levko Babij, Edward Brodack and Yaroslav Hunka - and Savaryn himself had been a veteran of the Division. After media attention to Hunka in 2023, the university returned the $30,000 endowment named for him and the Governor General of Canada apologised for Savaryn being appointed to the Order of Canada in 1987, leading to pressure for the other honours to be returned too.

=== Other ===
- The university participated in the initial development of the Mizar system.
- The asteroid 99906 Uofalberta is named in the university's honour, in part because the initials of its motto Quaecumque Vera ("Whatsoever things are true") appeared in the object's provisional designation 2002 QV_{53}.

== Rankings and reputation ==
University rankings

World rankings
- ARWU World: 101–150
- QS World: 96
- QS Employability: 99
- THE World: =116
- THE Employability: 169
- USNWR World: =150
- 4–5

Canadian rankings
- QS National: 4
- THE National: =4
- USNWR National: 5
- Maclean's Medical/Doctoral: 6

The University of Alberta has ranked in several post-secondary rankings. In the 2023 Academic Ranking of World Universities rankings, the university ranked 91st in the world and fourth in Canada. The 2025 QS World University Rankings ranked the university 96th in the world, and fourth in Canada. The 2024 Times Higher Education World University Rankings ranked the university 109th in the world, and fifth in Canada. In the 2022–23 U.S. News & World Report Best Global University Ranking, the university ranked 136th in the world, and fourth in Canada. The Canadian-based Maclean's magazine ranked the University of Alberta 5th in their 2023 Canadian Medical Doctoral university category. The university was ranked despite having opted out — along with several other universities in Canada — of participating in Maclean's graduate survey since 2006.

Along with academic and teaching rankings, the university has also been ranked by publications that evaluate the employment prospects of its graduates. In the Times Higher Education's 2022 global employability ranking, the university ranked 172nd in the world, and sixth in Canada. In QS's 2022 graduate employability ranking, the university ranked 99th in the world, and fifth in Canada.

== Campuses ==
The university has five distributed campuses including, in addition to the North Campus, two auxiliary satellites: Campus Saint-Jean in southeast Edmonton, and Augustana Campus in Camrose, 90 kilometres southeast of Edmonton. An extensively renovated and refurbished historic Hudson's Bay department store in downtown Edmonton, renamed Enterprise Square, serves as a campus for adult students belonging to the Faculty of Extension. The university owns a set of large parcels of mostly undeveloped land (used as an experimental farm and the site of several agricultural and sports facilities) slightly south of the main campus, called South Campus (previously the University Farm).

=== North Campus ===
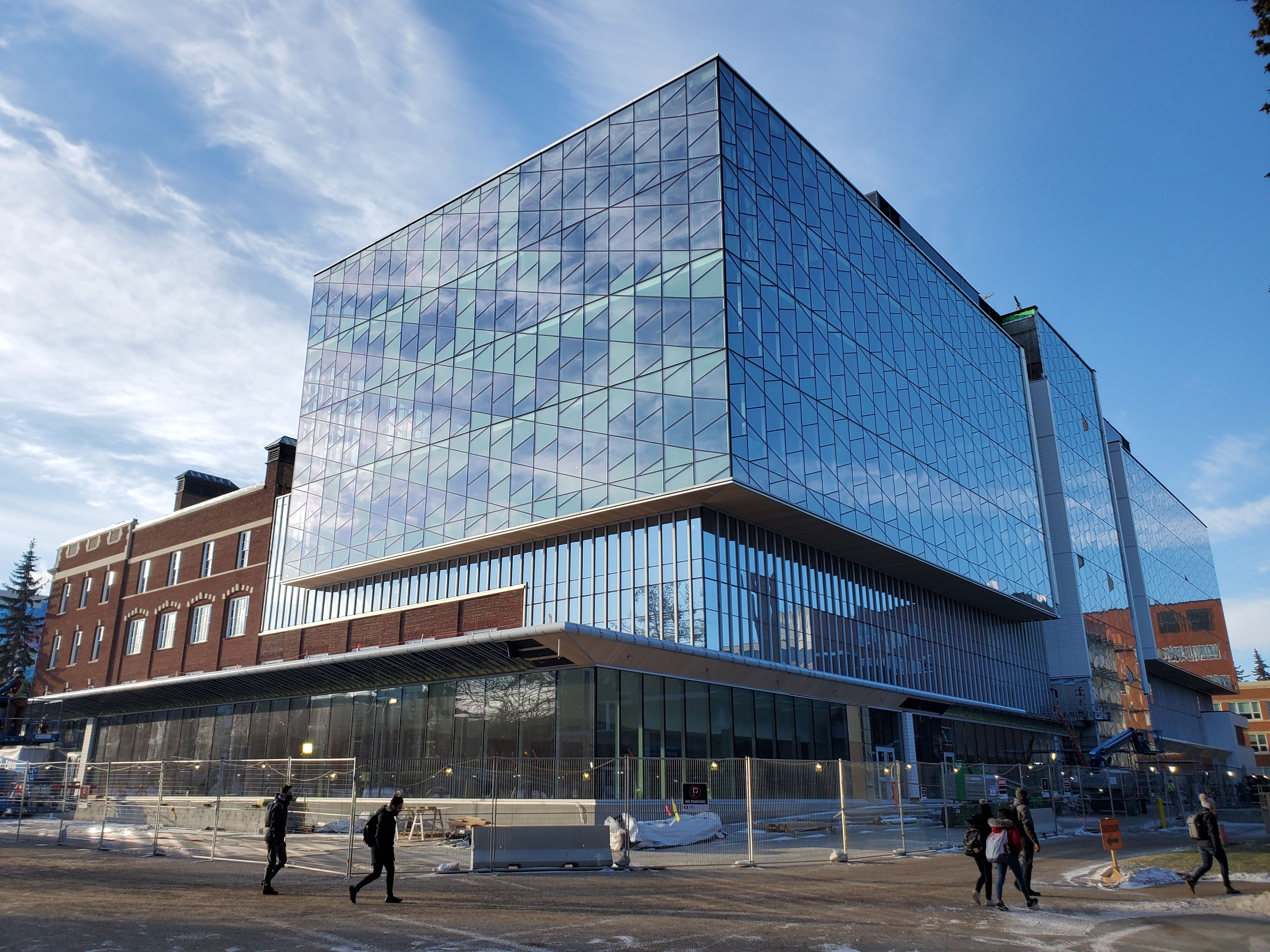
The Dentistry Pharmacy Building, seen from the rear during its multi-year renovation

The North Campus is the original location of the University of Alberta. Located on the southern banks of the North Saskatchewan River, it has 150 buildings on 92 hectares (230 acres) of land.

Architect Barton Myers completed the long-range campus plan in 1969 and continued as a planner for the university until 1978.

The distinctive cupola of the Dentistry/Pharmacy Centre on North Campus was featured in a commemorative stamp issued by Canada Post in 2008, the year of the university's centenary.

=== South Campus ===
Located two kilometres south of the North Campus, the South Campus is much larger in terms of land area. The two campuses are linked by the Edmonton LRT system. South Campus/Fort Edmonton Park station is near Foote Field and the Saville Community Sports Centre, forming a natural gateway to the new campus architectural model, since 2009. Along with Health Sciences, University, and Enterprise Square stations, the LRT connects the U of A through four stations. In addition to educational facilities, the university is closely affiliated with six non-profit day care centres, many of which run partnered initiatives such as the Physical Literacy for Active Youth (PLAY) Program as an educational practical learning experience for University of Alberta students.

Much of the university's agricultural research in food safety and crop use for food and industrial products happens at the Edmonton Research Station Experimental Farms on South Campus. This campus is also home to the Saville Community Sports Centre, a 32,500-square-metre, multi-use recreation facility that hosts 14 varsity teams and several community sports clubs. In 2013, the Saville Centre became the new training centre for the Canadian senior women's basketball team.

=== Campus Saint-Jean ===
The Campus Saint-Jean is a francophone campus located five kilometres east of the main campus, in Bonnie Doon, formerly named "Faculté Saint-Jean". It is the only French-language university campus west of Manitoba. Due to increasing enrolment, the Campus Saint-Jean is undergoing expansion, acquiring new laboratory and classroom spaces. Students at Campus Saint-Jean pursue bachelor's degrees in the sciences or arts, or complete their first year of Engineering, after which they often transfer to the University of Alberta's main campus. Bilingual Nursing and Business programs are also available.

=== Augustana Campus ===
The Augustana Campus is located in Camrose, a small city in rural Alberta about 100 km southeast of Edmonton. In 2004, the former Augustana University College in Camrose merged with the University of Alberta, thus creating the new satellite Augustana Campus. Students enrolled at the Augustana Campus currently pursue four-year bachelor's degrees in arts, sciences, or music.

=== Enterprise Square ===
Enterprise Square opened for business January 15, 2008 on the north side of the North Saskatchewan river in downtown Edmonton. It is located in the historical building previously occupied by the Hudson's Bay Company. The building underwent major renovations. Enterprise Square houses the University of Alberta Faculty of Extension, the professional development activities of the Alberta School of Business, the Alberta Business Family Institute, and the Design Gallery. It is the home of the University of Alberta Alumni Association.

== Investment in health and science ==
$1.6 billion in construction has been undertaken at the university related to fields in health and science. The projects expand the University of Alberta's research capacity in the field of health. Over the past five years, the University of Alberta has averaged nearly $500 million in external research funding a year. The funding is expected to increase due to added research and teaching capacity.

=== Centennial Centre for Interdisciplinary Science ===
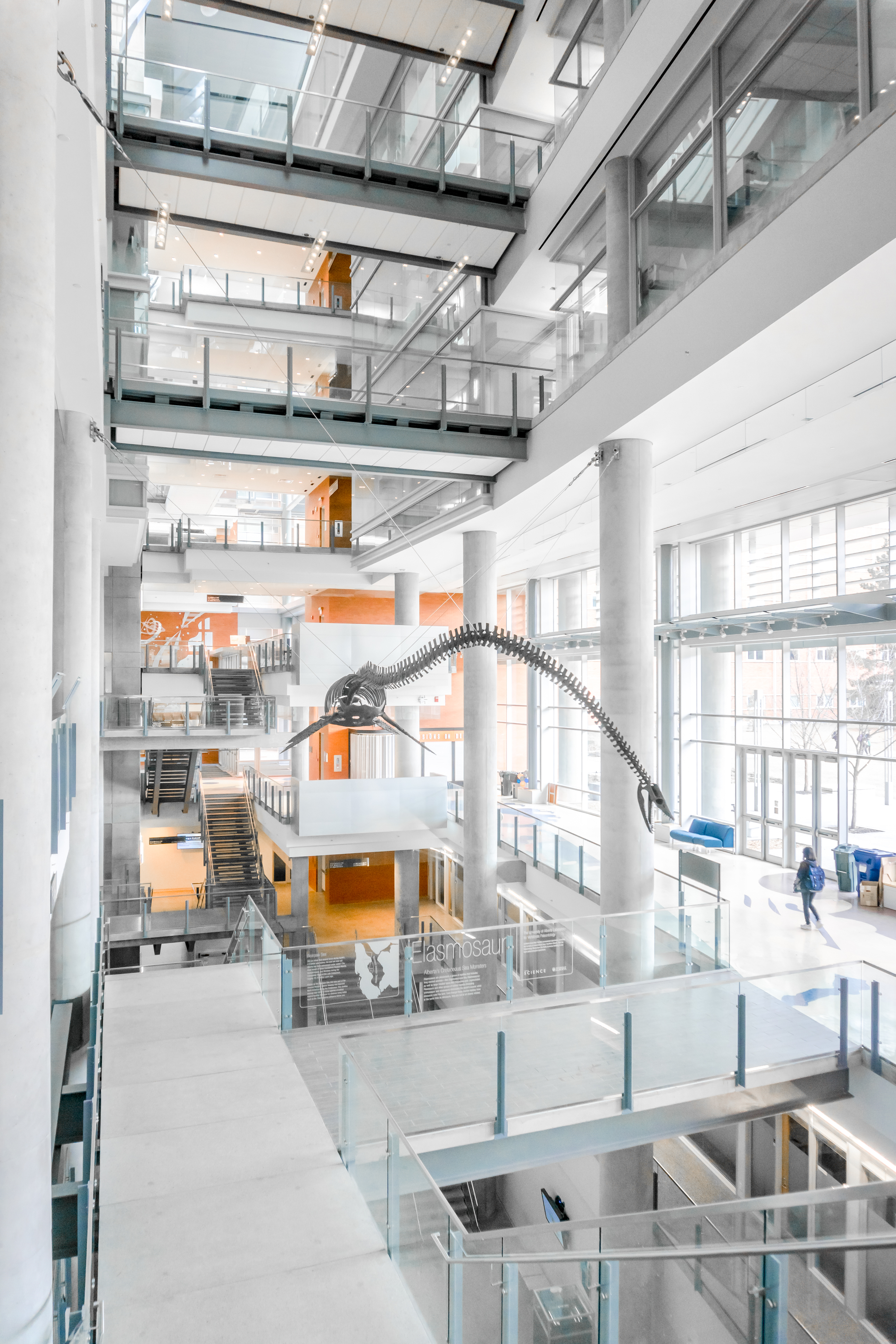
The Centennial Centre for Interdisciplinary Science

A major project, completed in the spring of 2011 with a grand opening on September 23, 2011, was the $400-million, Centennial Centre for Interdisciplinary Science (CCIS), a facility for interdisciplinary research groups, as well as the Department of Physics, the Faculty of Science offices and the Interdepartmental Science Students' Society's office. Three buildings – V-Wing (a large one-floor building composed of 10 lecture halls, of which two will remain), the Avadh Bhatia Physics Building (a six-storey building formerly housing the Department of Physics offices and laboratories), and the old Centre for Subatomic Research – were demolished to make way for CCIS.

=== Dianne and Irving Kipnes Health Research Academy ===
The Edmonton Clinic (formerly the Health Science Ambulatory Learning Centre) is a joint project with Alberta Health Services, and consists of two separate buildings. Construction started in 2008 on the multidisciplinary health science facilities totalling $909 million and 170,000 square metres surrounding the Health Sciences LRT Station. Edmonton Clinic South (now known as Kaye Edmonton Clinic), a nine-storey building, focuses on patient care and houses most of the medical and dental clinics, while the Dianne and Irving Kipnes Health Research Academy (formerly the Edmonton Clinic Health Academy [ECHA]) is a six-storey building that is the home of interdisciplinary health research and education currently held at the university. The building was officially opened in January 2012 and was formally renamed in September 2025 following a $25-million donation from the Dianne and Irving Kipnes Foundation. The Kaye Edmonton Clinic, owned and operated by Alberta Health Services, opened in December 2012.

=== Health research innovation facilities ===
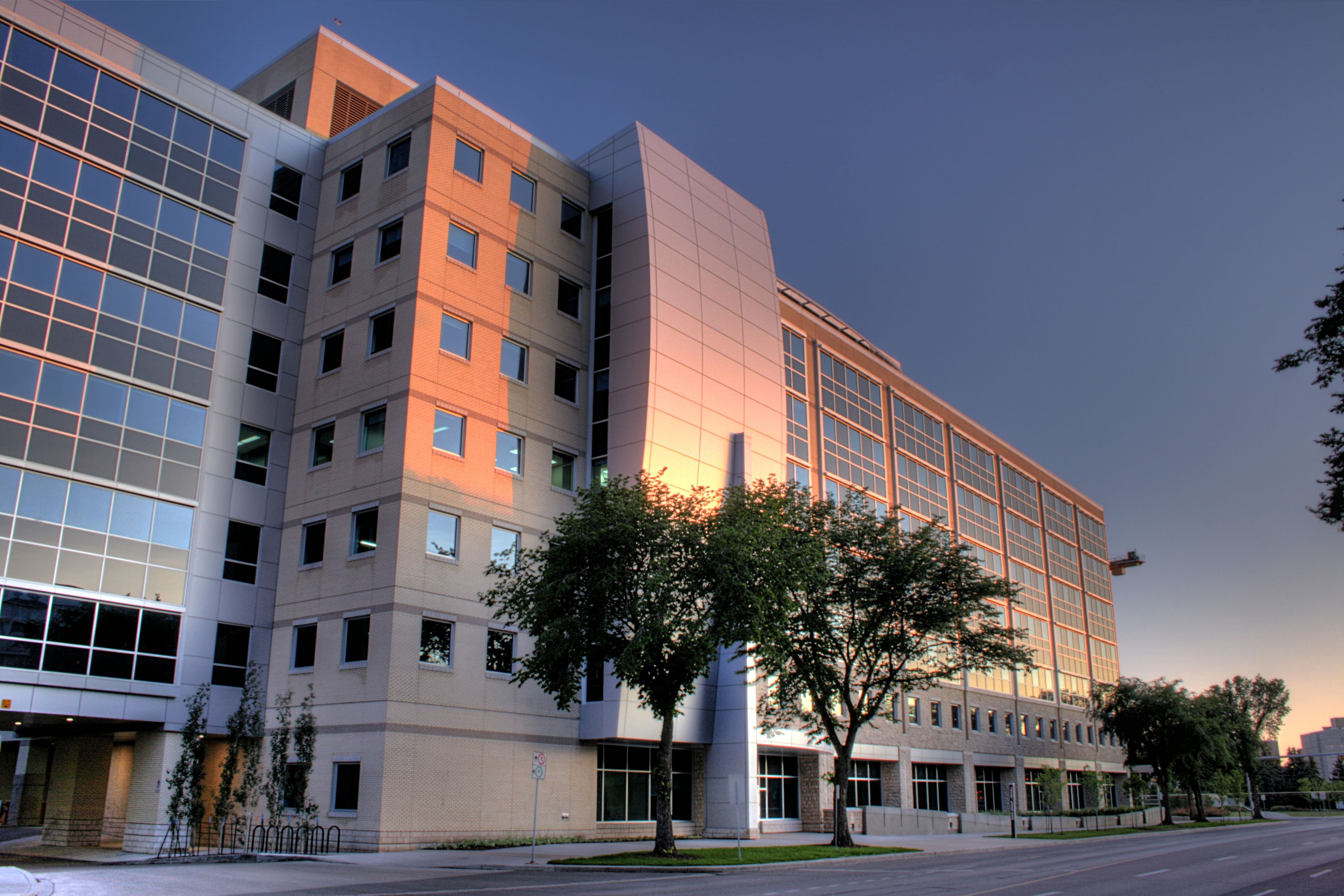
Katz Group Centre for Pharmacy and Health Research

Two new $300-million buildings adjacent to the Heritage Medical Research Centre building on the main campus, along with existing health-care and health research facilities and the Edmonton Clinic Health Academy, form a health precinct of two city blocks dedicated to health research, education and patient care. The newest facilities form a translational research centre designed to create an environment for "bench-to-bedside" health research by increasing interaction between researchers and clinicians focused on common medical issues. A total of 65,000 square metres (699,700 square feet) gross area constructed on two sites contribute to research by allowing the university to hire over 100 additional biomedical and health researchers. This is projected to result in a doubling of research funding by 2014.

Katz Group Centre for Pharmacy and Health Research

The hub of the complex is the Katz Group Centre for Pharmacy and Health Research (formerly HRIF West), an eight-storey building that provides the main entrance to the complex and becomes the critical link between Medical Sciences Building and Heritage Medical Research Centre. The Katz Group Centre is a teaching and research facility. It is home to the Li Ka Shing Institute of Virology, led by scientific director Lorne Tyrrell, MD, PhD, and includes some of the world's top virologists, including Michael Houghton, PhD, Canada Excellence Research Chair and Li Ka Shing Chair in Virology, who co-led the team that discovered the hepatitis C virus during his previous career in private industry.

The Centre houses the Sensory Motor Adaptive Rehabilitation Technology (SMART) Network Innovation Centre which serves to oversee the development of smart medical devices and rehabilitative interventions to improve quality of life for people with neural injuries and diseases. SMART is led by Vivian Mushahwar and encompasses over 90 scientists engaging in neuroscience, engineering, computer science, and rehabilitation.

The facility is located on the corner of 87 Avenue and 114 Street in Edmonton, Alberta.

Li Ka Shing Centre for Health Research Innovation

The Li Ka Shing Centre for Health Research Innovation (formerly HRIF East) anchors the southeast corner of the health precinct and is also home to the Alberta Diabetes Institute (ADI). Both the east and west buildings of HRIF are linked at every floor to the Heritage Medical Research Centre with the exception of Level 1 of HRIF West. The facility is dedicated to health research. The facility is named in honour of a gift in 2010 of $28 million from the Li Ka Shing (Canada) Foundation that helped establish the Li Ka Shing Institute of Virology ($25M) and a joint PhD program ($3M) between the university's Faculty of Medicine & Dentistry and Shantou University Medical College in China. As of fall 2012, this remains the largest single cash gift to the University of Alberta. The facility is located on the corner of 87 Avenue and 112 Street in Edmonton, Alberta.

== Student life ==
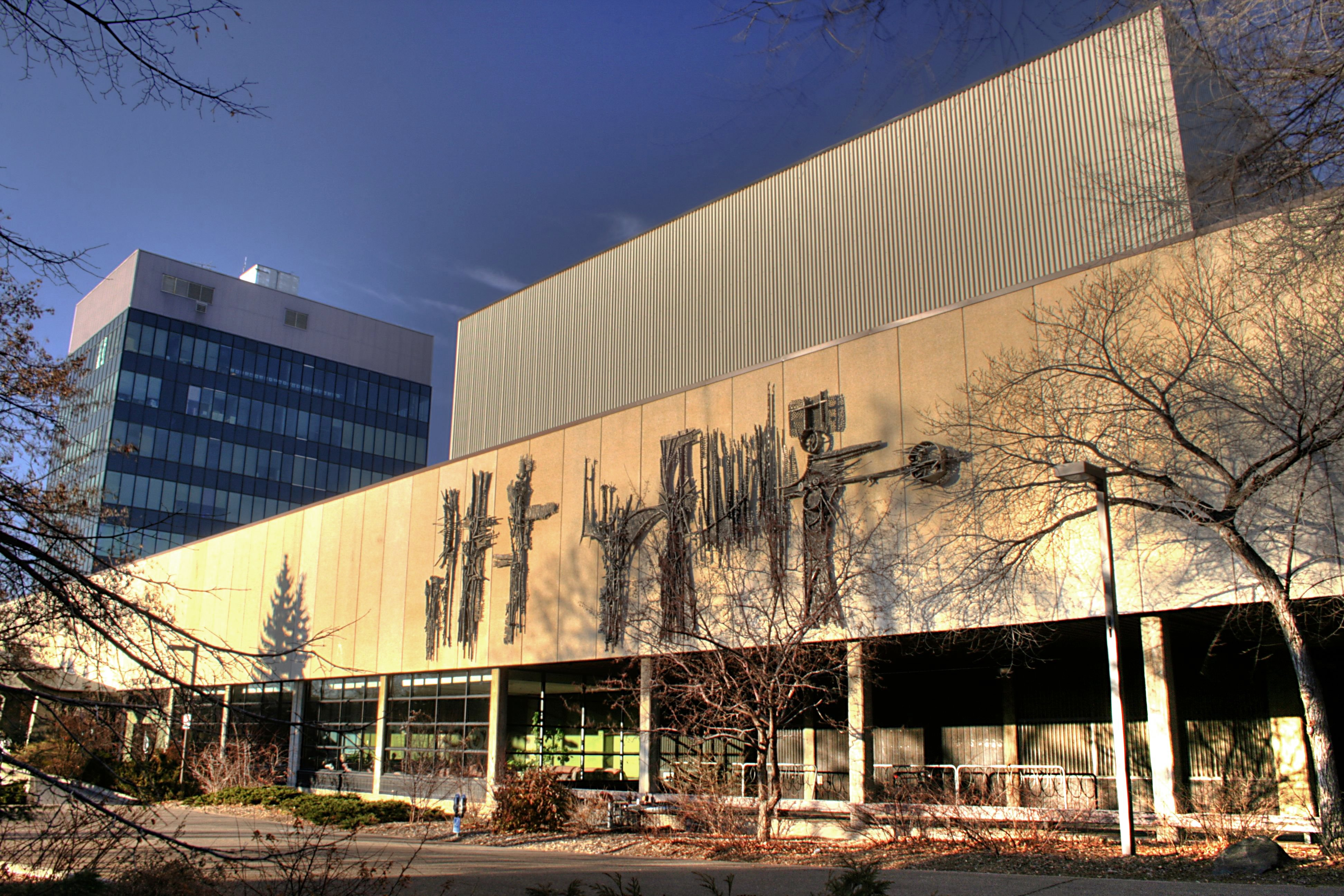
The Students' Union Building hosts a number of student organizations, including the University of Alberta Students' Union.

The student body of the University of Alberta is represented by two students' unions, the University of Alberta Students' Union for all undergraduate students, and the Graduate Student Association for all graduate students. In addition, a number of the university's academic programs also manage their own student representative body. Students within the residences are represented by a number of associations, primarily the University of Alberta Residence Halls Association. As of 2014, there are more than 450 student organizations and clubs, covering a wide range of interests such as academics, culture, religion, social issues, and recreation. The undergraduate student union, as well as many of the student organizations, are centred in the university's student activity centre, the Students' Union Building. The building was opened in 1967, and hosts the majority of the Students' Union services and business operations. The two primary media outlets amongst the student population is the student newspaper, The Gateway, and campus radio, CJSR-FM.

=== Greek life ===
From 1909 to 1929, the university held a ban against fraternities and sororities, since Henry Marshall Tory, the first president of the university, ordered all secret societies, including Upsilon Upsilon and Pi Sigma Phi, to be disbanded. The drive to remove the ban begun in 1927, when students had formed the Athenian Club to lobby the university. During the same year, several men had formed the Rocky Mountain Goat Club, which was only official sanctioned due to the lack of any secret rituals or a written constitution. The ban on fraternities and sororities would end in 1929, with the departure of President Tory. Members of the Rocky Mountain Goat Club had later formed the nucleus of the university's first fraternities. Phi Delta Theta was the first fraternity officially recognized and chartered on September 2, 1930. Fraternities and sororities are recognized as student groups by the university and Students' Union through Student Group Services. They are supported by local alumni advisors, their international headquarters, and a fraternity and sorority advisor. In addition, the fraternities are also governed by the Interfraternity Council and the Panhellenic Council.

There are eleven fraternity chapters recognized as a student group by the university. There are currently six sorority chapters recognized by the university.

=== Athletics ===
The Athletics program at the university is managed by the Athletics Department, a service unit under the Faculty of Kinesiology, Sport, and Recreation. The university's male varsity teams are known as the University of Alberta Golden Bears, while the female varsity team is known as the University of Alberta Pandas. The university's varsity teams compete in the Canada West Universities Athletic Association conference of U Sports. The university's varsity sports programs include basketball, cross-country, curling, football, golf, hockey, rugby, soccer, swimming, track and field, tennis, volleyball, and wrestling. The university athletics department manages more than 500 students in over 24 teams.

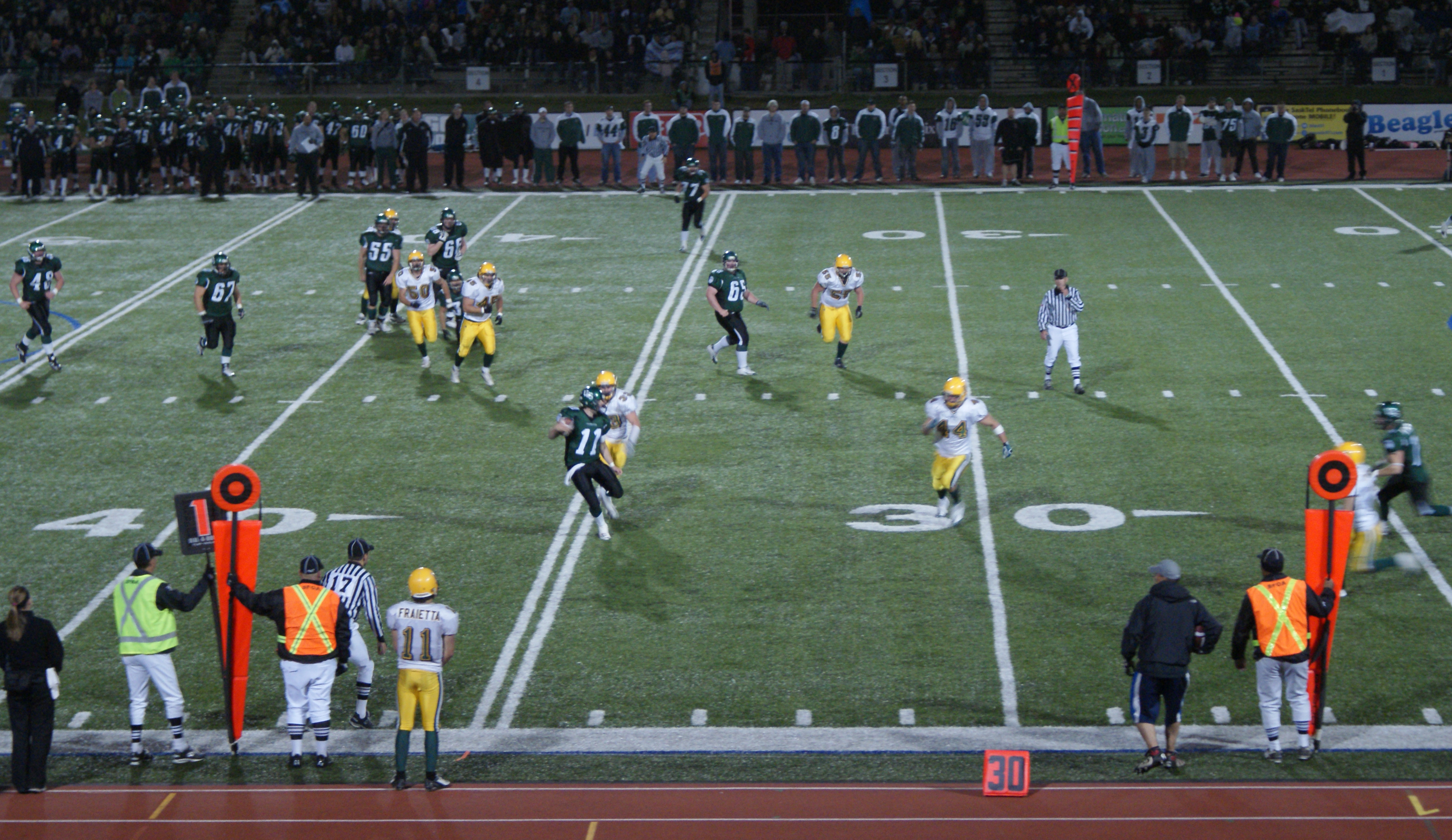
The Golden Bears football team playing football against the University of Saskatchewan Huskies. Football is one of 13 varsity programs offered by the university's athletics program.

The Golden Bears and Pandas have won 68 national championships since 1961. The men's ice hockey team has won the Canada West Conference Championships championship 25 times, and the national championship 15 times, making it the Golden Bears' most successful team at the regional and national level.

The Faculty of Kinesiology, Sport, and Recreation also operate a number of intramural, sport club and group fitness programs, available to any undergraduate and graduate student that pays the Athletic and Recreation fee through the Campus & Community Recreation service unit. Sports offered include traditional sports like volleyball, basketball, soccer and cricket, as well as less traditional events like dodgeball, inner tube water polo, and wallyball.

The university has athletic facilities open to both their varsity teams as well as to their students. Opened in 2015, the Physical Activity and Wellness (PAW) Centre opened as a partnership between the Students' Union, Graduate Students Association, the Faculty of Kinesiology, Sport, and Recreation, University of Alberta, the Government of Alberta and the Hanson and Wilson Family. The PAW Centre encourages healthy lifestyles choices by offering a variety of activities related to wellness. Components include a new student fitness centre, sports-related research and lab facilities, a variety of student service spaces as well as the new home of the Steadward Centre, a high-calibre research and program delivery centre for people with disabilities. Foote Field is a multi-sport facility named after its benefactor, Eldon Foote. The sports facility is home to the varsity Golden Bears and Pandas track and field, football, soccer and rugby. Depending on the sporting event, the field's seating capacity ranges from 1,500 to 3,500. Foote Field also hosts the Canadian Athletics Coaching Centre, and had previously hosted events in international athletics competitions, such as the 2001 World Championships in Athletics. Other facilities include the Van Vliet Complex, named after Maury Van Vliet, the first director of the Faculty of Physical Education (Now the Faculty of Kinesiology, Sport, and Recreation). The facility holds physical activity spaces including; the Clare Drake Arena several gymnasium, an aquatic centre, fitness centres, and courts for racquetball and squash. The Saville Community Sports Centre is another multi-sport complex located on the university's campus. The centre is also home of the Golden Bears and Pandas basketball, curling, tennis and volleyball teams, and houses the Canadian Curling Association National Training Centre, Tennis Canada High Performance Tennis Development Centre, and Team Ortona Gymnastics. The university also operates the Universiade Pavilion, a multi-sport facility constructed for the 1983 Summer Universiade.

=== History of Queer life ===
In 1984, students formed "Gays and Lesbians On Campus" (GALOC). In 1985, a "Pink Triangle" supplement first appeared in The Gateway student newspaper. That same year, GALOC organized U of A's first pride event, GALA Week, which became an annual event. In 1990, GALOC held "Blue Jean Day", when gays, lesbians, and supporters wore denim jeans for a day; incidents of homophobia were reported. Since 2013, the university has held a Pride Week each mid-March, which includes a pride parade across North Campus. In 2021, events were held virtually.

== Insignias and other representations ==
=== Coat of arms ===
Coat of arms of the university

The coat of arms of the university was adopted in 1909, following the recommendations of the university's senate to adopt the coat of arms of the province of Alberta as its emblem, with the addition of an open book superimposed upon the cross and a new motto. The coat of arms had undergone a number of changes, with the arms changing in the 1950s in keeping with the graphic style of the time, and in the early 1990s, in the university's efforts to have their arms gain official heraldic authority. The latest design was completed in 1994, being registered with the Canadian Heraldic Authority on 31 May 1994, and was presented to the university on 13 June 1994.

The coat of arms consists of a shield displaying the topography of Alberta rendered in the colours of the university. At the base is a prairie wheat field symbolizing Alberta's agricultural industry. The wavy gold line above represent the hills and rivers of Alberta. The top of the shield is in gold and separated from the rest of the shield by a line suggesting the Rocky Mountains. The book of learning dominates the design. A great horned owl, the provincial bird and an accepted symbol of knowledge is used as the crest of the coat of arms. The arm's supporters is the pronghorn, taken from the provincial coat of arms, and the golden bear, the mascot of the university.

=== Motto and song ===
The motto of the university, Quaecumque vera, translates to "whatsoever things are true." The original motto lux et lex, was first adopted in 1907, and was translated as "light and law" in Latin. The motto was substituted with the present motto in 1909. The motto was adopted from the Latin Vulgate version of the Bible, the Epistle to the Philippians, where it states that,

Epistle to the Philippians, Chapter 4, Verse 8: —

Finally, brethren, whatsoever things are true, whatsoever things are honest, whatsoever things are just, whatsoever things are pure, whatsoever things are lovely, whatsoever things are of good report; if there be any virtue and there be any praise, think on these things.

Notable among a number of songs commonly played and sung at events such as commencement and convocation, and athletic games are: Alberta, with words and music by Emma Newton; Alberta Cheer Song, with words by R.K. Michael, and music by Charleston Lamberston; The Evergreen and Gold, with words by William H. Alexander, and the music taken from the National Anthem of Russia; and Quaecumque vera, with words and music by Ewart W. Stutchbury.

=== Symbols ===
The official colours of the university are green and gold. The green represents the wide stretches of prairie land flanked by deep spruce forests and is symbolic of hope and optimism; the gold represents the golden harvest fields and is symbolic of the light of knowledge. The original suggestion for green and gold colours came from Marion Kirby Alexander, drawing inspiration from the autumn colours of the river valley below the campus. Her husband, William Hardy Alexander, a professor at the university, relayed the suggestion to a faculty meeting on 5 October 1908 and would later gain the approval of the senate. The university colours are present throughout the institution. These colours are also displayed on the university flag. The university flag consists of the shield of the coat of arms on a gold background.

== Notable people ==
As of 2013, the University of Alberta had 260,000 living graduates, 93 per cent of whom resided in Canada. Outside of Canada, the United States holds the greatest amount of alumni, nearly four per cent of all living graduates. Alumni and former students have won awards, including 78 Rhodes Scholarships Distinguished alumni include Raymond Lemieux, awarded the Albert Einstein World Award of Science in 1992, and former faculty member Malcolm Forsyth, three-time award winner of the Juno Award for Classical Composition In the literary arts there are major Canadian writers Margaret Atwood, Aritha Van Herk, Sheila Watson, and Rudy Wiebe. The university is associated with three Nobel laureates: alumnus Richard E. Taylor, who was awarded the Nobel Prize in Physics in 1990, and faculty members Derek Walcott, who was awarded the Nobel Prize in Literature in 1992, and Michael Houghton, who was awarded the Nobel Prize in Medicine in 2020. Its faculty also hosts Turing Award winner and reinforcement learning pioneer Richard S. Sutton.

A number of graduates have achievements in business, including Daryl Katz, chair of the Katz Group of Companies and owner of the Edmonton Oilers, Bernard Ebbers, former CEO of WorldCom, and Greg Zeschuk, and Ray Muzyka, co-founders of BioWare. In academia, a number of faculty members and graduates also gained prominence including faculty member Ludwig von Bertalanffy, for his work systems theory, and alumnus Tak Wah Mak, discoverer of the T-cell receptor.

Eric Allan Kramer graduated from the University of Alberta with a Bachelor in Fine Arts. He is most notable in the role of Bob Duncan in the Disney Channel sitcom Good Luck Charlie.

The author of the bestseller 12 Rules for Life, Jordan Peterson, graduated from the University of Alberta with a Bachelor of Arts in Political Science (1982) and Psychology (1984).

Many former students have gained local and national prominence for serving in government. Alumnus Roland Michener served as the 20th Governor General of Canada. The 16th Prime Minister of Canada, Joe Clark, also graduated from Alberta. A number of graduates have served at the provincial level, as premiers and lieutenant governors, including George Stanley, the 25th Lieutenant Governor of New Brunswick and designer of the Canadian flag. Lois Hole, the former chancellor of the university, served as the 15th Lieutenant Governor of Alberta. Graduates who served as provincial premiers include Pat Binns, the 30th Premier of Prince Edward Island, Peter Lougheed, the 10th Premier of Alberta, Dave Hancock, the 15th Premier of Alberta, Jim Prentice, the 16th Premier of Alberta, and Rachel Notley, the 17th Premier of Alberta. Ed Stelmach, the 13th Premier of Alberta, attended the university but did not finish. The third chancellor of the university, Alexander Cameron Rutherford, also served as the first premier of Alberta. A number of graduates also held office in the Parliament of Canada, including Rona Ambrose, who served as the President of the Queen's Privy Council for Canada, and David Emerson, who served as the Minister of Foreign Affairs. In Nigeria Olawale Sulaiman is the special adviser to the Governor of Kwara State on health matters.

The 17th Chief Justice of Canada, Beverley McLachlin, the first female chief justice, is a graduate from the university. Other faculty and alumni who have served on Canada's highest court include Justice Henry Grattan Nolan, who served for a year before dying in 1957; Justice Ronald Martland, who served on the court for 24 years beginning in 1958; Justice Gérard Vincent La Forest, a former dean of law at the U of A who was elevated to the court in 1985 and served for 12 years; former law professor and alumnus Justice William Stevenson, who served two years on the court beginning in 1990; and former law professor Justice Russell Brown, who was named to the court in 2015.

Violet King Henry was the first black woman lawyer in Canada, the first black person to graduate law in Alberta and the first black person to be admitted to the Alberta Bar. She was also the first woman named to a senior management position with the American national YMCA.

== See also ==
- Canadian government scientific research organizations
- Canadian industrial research and development organizations
- Canadian university scientific research organizations
- Folkways Records
- Higher education in Alberta
- List of agricultural universities and colleges
- List of universities in Canada
- Alberta School of Business
- University of Alberta shooting
