= Rutherford Library =

Library at the University of Alberta

Coordinates: 53°31′28″N 113°31′28″W

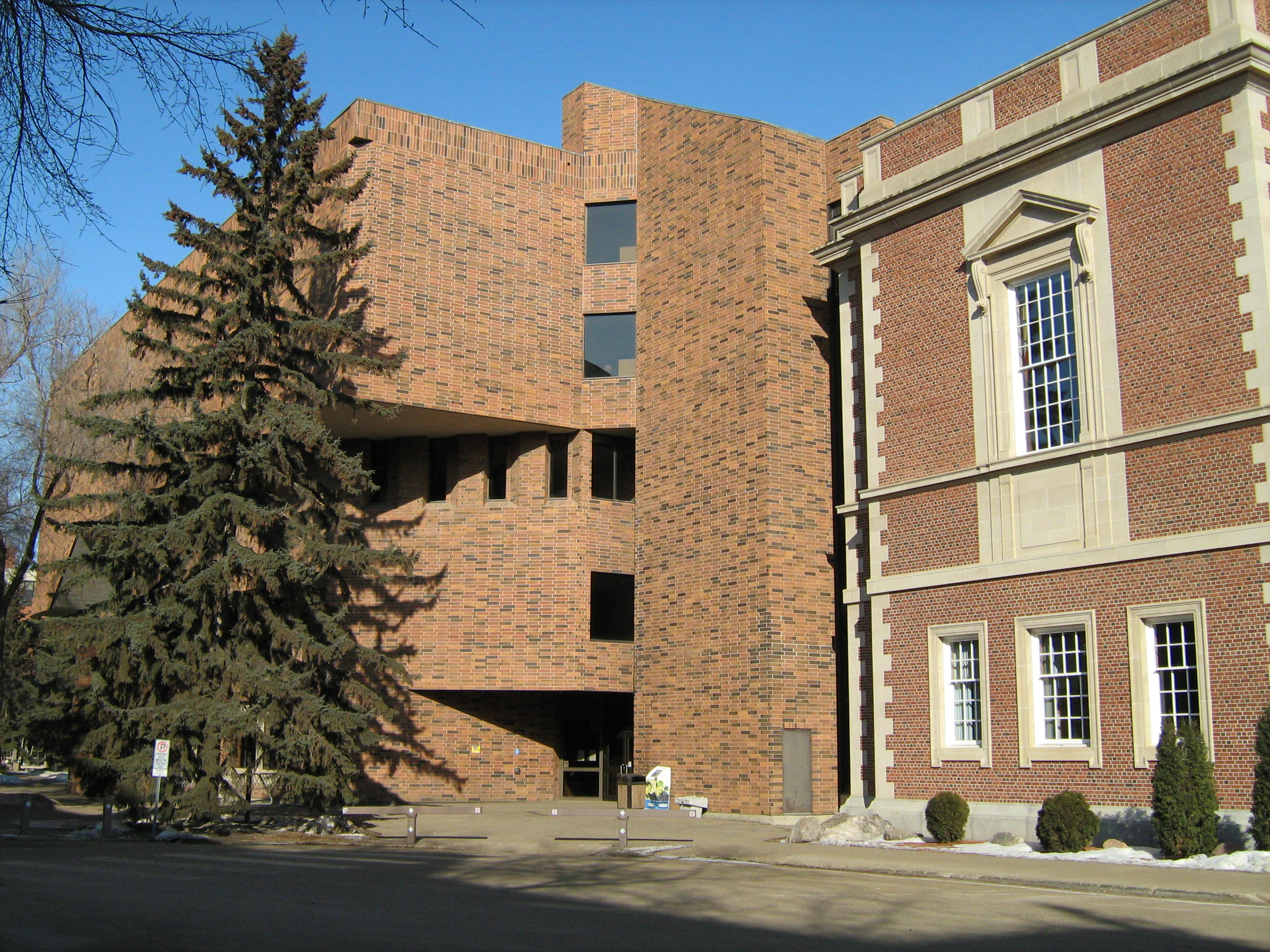
- West entrance to Rutherford Library
- Type: University of Alberta Library
- Established: May 15, 1951

Collection
- Criteria for collection: research publications

Other information
- Website: Rutherford library

The Rutherford Humanities, Social Sciences + Education Library, better known simply as Rutherford Library, is a research library at the University of Alberta in Edmonton, Alberta, Canada. Opened in May 15, 1951 as the university's first free-standing library, it is named after the founder of the university, and long-time chancellor, Alexander Cameron Rutherford.

== Overview ==
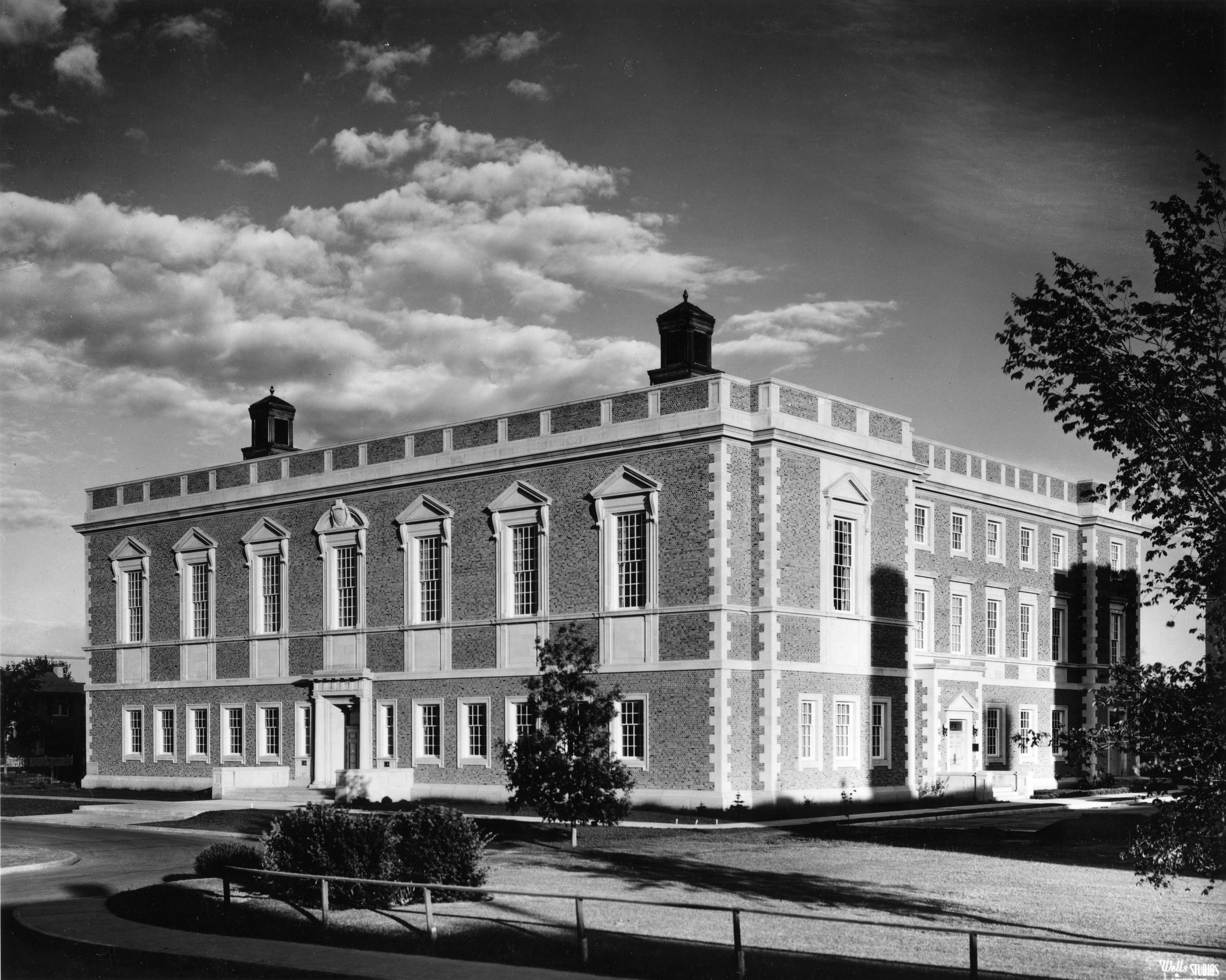
Exterior of Rutherford Library, circa 1951. Source: University of Alberta Archives

Rutherford Library was officially opened in a ceremony on May 15, 1951, in which former university president R.C. Wallace paid tribute to his former friend and colleague. The initial library inventory included most of Alexander Cameron Rutherford's personal book collection, of over 8000 volumes, with some select books having been gifted to Queen's University.

== History ==
The plans for Rutherford Library were drawn up from 1948 to 1951, and included features that would make the new library one of the best in Canada. Durable building materials were specified, including all oak trim and doors, combined with marble floors and staircases with brass railings. As there was no previous free-standing library on campus, for over 5000 students, other than a reading room arrangement, the addition was welcomed by students and staff alike, heralding a new era for the university.

=== Rutherford North ===
A new wing of the library was officially opened on September 27, 1974, by Mrs. Hazel McCuaig (Hazel Elizabeth Rutherford) and designated "Rutherford North". The distinctive brickwork of Rutherford North was designed by the architectural firm of Minsos, Vaitkunas and Jamieson in conformance with the structure of the original Rutherford Library. The Rutherford North design encapsulates and encloses the north face of the original building in a large open space. The new brick motif of Rutherford North was named "Rutherford Autumn Leaf" and registered in the building industry.

== Partnerships and collaboration ==
The University of Alberta Library is a member of the Association of Research Libraries, Canadian Association of Research Libraries, and is a contributor to the Open Content Alliance.
