= 2022 Canadian honours =

Canadian government recognitions

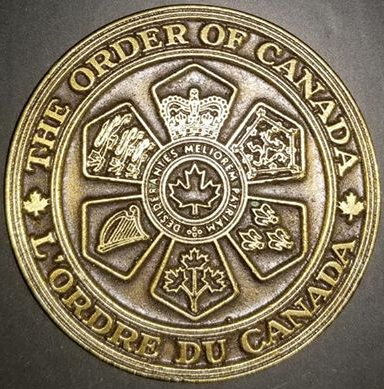
The Seal of the Order of Canada

The following are the appointments to various Canadian honours of 2022. Usually, they are announced as part of the New Year and Canada Day celebrations and are published within the Canada Gazette during the year. This follows the custom set out within the United Kingdom which publishes its appoints of various British Honours for New Year's and for monarch's official birthday. However, instead of the midyear appointments announced on Victoria Day, the official birthday of the Canadian Monarch, this custom has been transferred with the celebration of Canadian Confederation and the creation of the Order of Canada.

However, as the Canada Gazette publishes appointment to various orders, decorations and medal, either Canadian or from Commonwealth and foreign states, this article will reference all Canadians so honoured during the 2022 calendar year.

The first appointments to the Order of Canada were announced on 29 December 2021.

== The Order of Merit ==
Undress ribbon of a Member of the Order of Merit

=== Sovereign of the Order of Merit as of 8 September 2022 ===
His Majesty King Charles III, King of Canada

=== Member of the Order of Merit ===
- Professor Margaret MacMillan, OM, CC, CH, FRSL, FRSC, FBA, FRCGS

== The Order of Canada ==
=== Sovereign of the Order of Canada as of 8 September 2022 ===
His Majesty King Charles III, King of Canada

=== Companions of the Order of Canada ===
Undress ribbon of a Companion of the Order of Canada

- Yann Martel, CC
- Hon. Murray Sinclair, CC, MSC
- Stacey Ann Allaster, C.C.
- Frank Joseph Hayden, C.C., O.Ont. (this is a promotion within the Order)
- Peter Howard Russell, C.C. (this is a promotion within the Order)
- Donald Joseph Savoie, C.C., O.N.B. (this is a promotion within the Order)

=== Officers of the Order of Canada ===
Undress ribbon of an Officer of the Order of Canada

- Mehran Anvari, OC, OOnt
- Carl-Éric Aubin, OC
- Neil Bissoondath, OC, CQ
- Liona Boyd, OC, OOnt
- Barry D. Bultz, OC, AOE
- Pieter Cullis, OC
- Navjeet Singh Dhillon, OC
- Hon. Lillian Dyck, OC
- Connie Eaves, OC
- Hon. Ross Fitzpatrick, OC, OBC
- Geoffrey T. Fong, OC
- Evelyn L. Forget, OC
- Hon. Hugh Fraser, OC
- Victoria Grant, OC
- Margo Lainne Greenwood, OC
- Frances Henry, OC
- Tomson Highway, OC
- C. Céleste Johnston, OC
- Vaikuntam Iyer Lakshmanan, OC
- Frederick A. Leighton, OC
- J. R. Léveillé, OC
- Patricia Livingston, OC
- Alejandro G. Marangoni, OC
- Roderick R. McInnes, OC, OOnt
- Donald Chisholm McKenzie, OC, MSM
- Ovide Mercredi, OC, OM
- Jacques Yves Montplaisir, OC
- Helene Polatajko, OC
- Edward J. Ratushny, OC, OOnt, QC
- Jean Riley Senft, OC
- Graham David Sher, OC
- Helga Stephenson, OC, OOnt
- Angela Swan, OC
- Ian Tamblyn, OC
- Carol M. Tator, OC
- D. R. Fraser Taylor, OC
- Louise Trottier, OC
- Verena Tunnicliffe, OC
- Mary Ellen Turpel-Lafond, OC
- Naomi Sara Azrieli, O.C.
- Donovan Bailey, O.C., O.Ont.
- Hon. Ethel Dorothy Blondin-Andrew, P.C., O.C.
- Robert Charles Davidson, O.C., O.B.C. (This is a promotion within the Order)
- Paul Joseph Dubord, O.C.
- Aled Morgan Edwards, O.C.
- Donald Arthur Enarson, O.C. (deceased)
- François Girard, O.C.
- Ian Stewart Hodkinson, O.C.
- Angela Diane James, O.C.
- David Thomas Lynch, O.C.
- Sandra Oh, O.C.
- Alberto Pérez-Gómez, O.C.
- David Waltner-Toews, O.C.

=== Honorary Members of the Order of Canada ===
- Jackie Richardson, CM

=== Members of the Order of Canada ===
Undress ribbon for a Member of the Order of Canada

- Harold Bassford, CM
- Francine Bois, CM
- Mary Ruth Brooks, CM
- Ann Buller, CM
- Judy Cameron, CM
- Hon. Sandra Chapnik, CM, OOnt
- Deborah Chatsis, CM
- Ralph Chiodo, CM, OOnt
- Lily Siewsan Chow, CM
- Eld. Ruth Christie, CM, OM
- Michael P. Collins, CM
- Gail Cyr, CM
- Sharon Davis-Murdoch, CM
- Janis Dunning, CM
- Jacques Lemay, CM
- Max Eisen, CM
- Robert Eisenberg, CM
- John Estacio, CM
- Charlie Kakotok Evalik, CM
- Mohamad Fakih, CM
- Graham Farquharson, CM
- Patricia M. Feheley, CM
- Eleanor Fish, CM
- Gerald Friesen, CM
- Rabbi Baruch Frydman-Kohl, CM
- Janice Fukakusa, CM
- Leo Joel Goldhar, CM
- Morris Goodman, CM
- Eric Ross Macdonald Haldenby, CM
- Walter N. Hardy, CM
- Lucille Harper, CM
- Jane Heyman, CM
- Jean Houde, CM
- William Humber, CM
- Lawson A. W. Hunter, CM, QC
- Kenneth W. Knox, CM
- Vahan Kololian, CM
- Olga Eliza Korper, CM
- Marc Labrèche, CM
- Gilbert Lacasse, CM
- Yves Lambert, CM
- Barbara Landau, CM
- Gerald Andrew Edward Lawrence, CM
- Pierre Legendre, CM, OQ
- Rose Lipszyc, CM
- Allan S. MacDonald, CM
- Andrew Paul MacDonald, CM
- Nona Macdonald Heaslip, CM
- Joy MacPhail, CM
- Ginette Mantha, CM
- Gregory Marchildon, CM
- Elizabeth McGregor, CM
- Bob McKeown, CM
- Pradeep Merchant, CM
- Pamela J. Minns, CM
- John Morrisseau, CM
- David Mostoway, CM
- Kathy Murphy, CM
- Kevin Murphy, CM
- Ralph Nilson, CM
- Janice O'Born, CM, OOnt
- Eva Olsson, CM, OOnt
- Barbara Paterson, CM
- Red Pedersen, CM, ONu
- W. Roman Petryshyn, CM
- Robin Poitras, CM
- Lynn Posluns, CM
- Alexander Reford, CM
- Léo Robert, CM
- Hazel Robinson, CM
- John Robinson, CM
- David Roche, CM
- Reginald Schwager, CM
- Harvey Secter, CM
- Robert Irwin Silver, CM
- Robert Small, CM
- Barry Smit, CM, OOnt
- Diane Sowden, CM
- Harriet H. Stairs, CM
- Sharon Straus, CM
- Barbara G. Stymiest, CM
- Bruny Surin, CM, CQ
- Curtis A. Suttle, CM
- Cara Tannenbaum, CM
- George M. Thomson, CM
- Jean-Marie Toulouse, CM, OQ
- Peter Vaughan, CM, CD
- Gilles Vincent, CM, CQ
- Luc Vinet, CM, OQ
- Janet Walker, CM, CD
- Vaughn Wyant, CM
- Peter Zandstra, CM
- David Zussman, CM
- Frances Abele, C.M.
- Ajay K. Agrawal, C.M.
- Louis-Philippe J. Léo Albert, C.M.
- R. Jamie Anderson, C.M.
- Suzanne Aubry, C.M.
- Hereditary Chief Stephen Joseph Augustine, C.M.
- Granger Richard Avery, C.M.
- Michel Beaulac, C.M.
- André Blanchet, C.M.
- Marilyn C. Bodogh, C.M.
- Jacques Bourgault, C.M.
- Bernard Brault, C.M.
- Marilyn Caroline Brooks-Coles, C.M., O.Ont.
- Hon. Marion R. Buller, C.M.
- James Thomas Byrnes, C.M., O.B.C.
- Geneviève Cadieux, C.M.
- James Lloyd Cassels, C.M., Q.C.
- Euclide Patrice Chiasson, C.M.
- William Foster Clark, C.M.
- Zane Cohen, C.M., O.Ont.
- Ethel Côté, C.M., O.Ont.
- Elder Reg Crow Shoe, C.M.
- Elder Rosemary Crow Shoe, C.M.
- Sheldon John Currie, C.M.
- Reginald Lester Davidson, C.M.
- Dorothy Ina Elgiva Dobbie, C.M.
- Eliahu Tzion Fathi, C.M.
- Madeleine Féquière, C.M.
- S/Sgt. Gary Eugene Goulet, C.M., (Ret'd)
- Michael Terry Harris, C.M.
- Paul Earl Heinbecker, C.M.
- Deborra Jane Hope, C.M.
- Sister Margaret Mary Hughes, C.M.
- Moira Fleming Hutchinson, C.M.
- Gérard Jean, C.M.
- Adam Kahane, C.M.
- Nancy Uqquujuq Karetak-Lindell, C.M.
- Eva-Marie Kröller, C.M.
- Gary Avrom Levy, C.M., O.Ont.
- Alexander Mair, C.M.
- Guy Matte, C.M.
- Milton McClaren, C.M.
- Roderick James McKay, C.M.
- Ben Mink, C.M.
- Donald James Mowat, C.M.
- Robert Donald Munro, C.M.
- Sister Bernadette Mary O'Reilly, C.M.
- Donna Ouchterlony, C.M.
- Fred Pellerin, C.M., C.Q.
- Elder David Gerard Perley, C.M.
- Elder Imelda Mary Perley, C.M.
- G. Ross Peters, C.M.
- Sandra Pitblado, C.M.
- Guy Jacques Pratte, C.M.
- Parminder S. Raina, C.M.
- Joel Solomon Reitman, C.M.
- David Nicholas Rush, C.M.
- Hon. Anne Helen Russell, C.M., Q.C.
- Suzanne Sauvage, C.M., O.Q.
- Martin T. Schechter, C.M., O.B.C.
- Jacques Jean Meor Shore, C.M.
- Ronald Julien Tremblay, C.M.
- Guylaine Tremblay, C.M.
- Michelle Valberg, C.M.
- Germaine Therese Warkentin, C.M.
- James Malcolm West, C.M.
- Michael West, C.M., O.Man
- Margie Wolfe, C.M.
- Lorraine M. Wright, C.M.
- Robert Stewart Wyatt, C.M.
- Jan Zwicky, C.M.

=== Terminiation of appointment to the Order of Canada ===
15 October 2022: "Notice is hereby given that the appointment of Johnny Nurraq Seotatituq Issaluk to the Order of Canada was terminated by Ordinance signed by the Governor General of Canada on August 31, 2022."

== Order of Military Merit ==
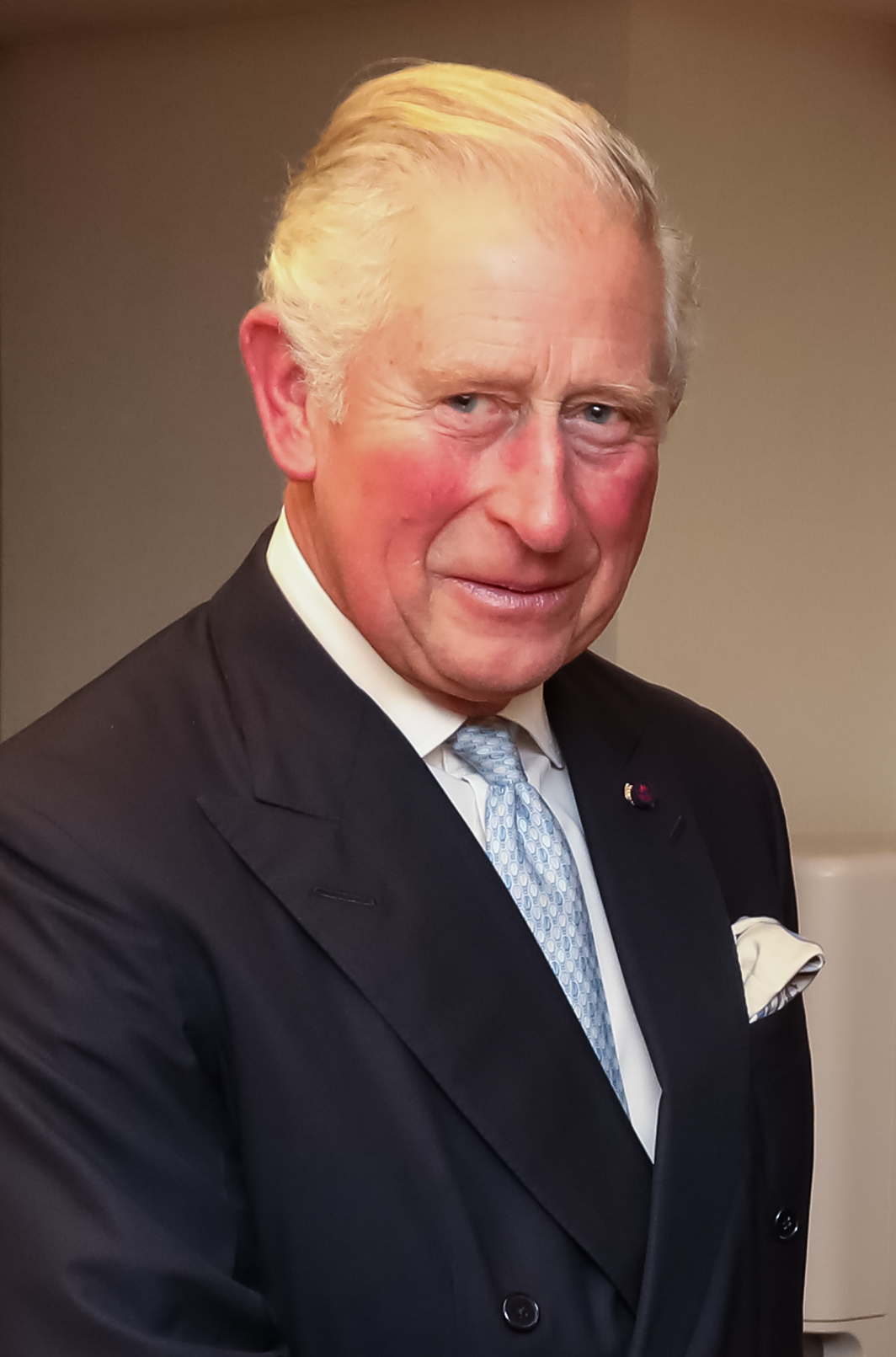
His Majesty The King of Canada

=== Sovereign of the Order of Military Merit as of 8 September 2022 ===
His Majesty King Charles III, King of Canada

=== Extraordinary Commander of the Order of Military Merit ===
- Vice-Admiral & Lieutenant-General His Royal Highness The Prince Charles, Prince of Wales PC, KG, KT, GCB, OM, AK, QSO, GCL, CC, CMM, SOM, CD, ADC

=== Termination of appointment to the Order of Military Merit ===
- Roch Lanteigne, (MMM), ONB, MSM, CD: Notice is hereby given that, further to his individual request and the Governor General's subsequent approval, the appointment of Master Warrant Officer (Retired) Roch Lanteigne to the Order of Military Merit was terminated by Ordinance signed on 11 February 2022.
- General (Retired) Jonathan Holbert Vance, (CMM), MSC, CD: Notice is hereby given that, further to his individual request and the Governor General's subsequent approval, the appointment of General (Retired) Jonathan Holbert Vance to the Order of Military Merit was terminated by Ordinance signed on 20 April 2022.

== Order of Merit of the Police Forces ==
=== Sovereign of the Order of the Police Forces - 8 September 2022 ===
Undress ribbon of a Commander of the Order of Merit of the Police Forces

His Majesty King Charles III, King of Canada

=== Officers of the Order of Merit of the Police Forces ===
Undress ribbon of an Officer of the Order of Merit of the Police Forces

- Chief Evan Bray, O.O.M.
- Deputy Commissioner Brian Frederick Brennan, O.O.M.
- Chief Shawn Dulude, O.O.M.
- Chief Daniel J. Kinsella, O.O.M. (This is a promotion within the Order)
- Chief Dean T. LaGrange, O.O.M.
- Director Jean-Pierre Larose, O.O.M.
- Assistant Commissioner Maureen Elizabeth Levy, O.O.M.
- Assistant Commissioner Jane MacLatchy, O.O.M.
- Chief James Ramer, O.O.M. (This is a promotion within the Order)
- Chief Jerel Swamp, O.O.M.
- Sergeant Casey Ward, O.O.M.

=== Members of the Order of Merit of the Police Forces ===
Undress ribbon of a Member of the Order of Merit of the Police Forces

- Akram Askoul, M.O.M.
- Sergeant Michelle Lee Bacik, M.O.M.
- Lisa Bianco, M.O.M.
- Associate Director François Bleau, M.O.M.
- Inspector Jason Paul Bobrowich, M.O.M.
- Superintendent Martin Bruce, M.O.M.
- Inspector David Brunner, M.O.M.
- Superintendent Manly J. K. Burleigh, M.O.M.
- Chief Edward Lennard Busch, M.O.M.
- Inspector Carl Cartright, M.O.M.
- Superintendent Stephen Cocks, M.O.M.
- Superintendent David Cook, M.O.M.
- Superintendent Elizabeth Darling, M.O.M.
- Acting Deputy Chief Myron Demkiw, M.O.M.
- Staff Sergeant Michael Elliott, M.O.M.
- Assistant Commissioner John Graham Ferguson, M.O.M.
- Inspector James Flewelling, M.O.M.
- Deputy Chief Brett Flynn, M.O.M.
- Superintendent Richard Frayne, M.O.M.
- Staff Sergeant Scott C. Fuller, M.O.M.
- Acting Sergeant Major Cheryl Gervais, M.O.M.
- Superintendent S. Dean Hilton, M.O.M.
- William Blaine Hutchins, M.O.M.
- Chief Constable David Jansen, M.O.M.
- Christopher D. John, M.O.M.
- Inspector Gregory Leong, M.O.M.
- Chief James MacSween, M.O.M.
- Superintendent Carole Matthews, M.O.M.
- Superintendent Cameron Grant McBride, M.O.M.
- Corps Sergeant Major Alan Daniel McCambridge, M.O.M., M.S.C.
- Inspector Timothy McGough, M.O.M.
- Constable Gary McLaughlin, M.O.M.
- Mourad Meberbeche, M.O.M.
- Constable Josée Mensales, M.O.M.
- Staff Sergeant Brent Jason Meyer, M.O.M.
- Deputy Chief Nick Milinovich, M.O.M.
- Sergeant David Moe, M.O.M.
- Commander Dominic Monchamp, M.O.M.
- Staff Sergeant Kevin Murray, M.O.M.
- Superintendent Patrick Gerald Nogier, M.O.M.
- Detective Sergeant Gary W. O'Brien, M.O.M.
- Staff Sergeant Lyndsay A. O'Ruairc, M.O.M.
- Deputy Chief Anthony Odoardi, M.O.M.
- Chief Superintendent Stephanie Patterson, M.O.M.
- Corporal Deepak Prasad, M.O.M.
- Sergeant Matthew J. Robinson, M.O.M.
- Deputy Chief Robertson Rouse, M.O.M.
- Sergeant Katherine Elizabeth Severson, M.O.M.
- Deputy Chief Harjinder Singh Sidhu, M.O.M.
- Corporal Leif Anthony Balle Svendsen, M.O.M.
- Superintendent Ricky Veerappan, M.O.M.
- Detective Staff Sergeant Scott Cameron Wade, M.O.M.
- Chief Stephen Williams, M.O.M.
- Craig Ernest Yorke, M.O.M.

== Royal Victorian Order ==
Undress ribbon for all grades of the Royal Victorian Order

=== Sovereign of the Royal Victorian Order as of 8 September 2022 ===
- His Majesty The King of Canada

== Most Venerable Order of the Hospital of St. John of Jerusalem ==
Undress ribbon for all grades of the Most Venerable Order of the Hospital of St. John of Jerusalem

=== Sovereign Head of the Order of St. John as of 8 September 2022 ===
- His Majesty The King of Canada

=== Bailiff Grand Cross of the Order of St. John ===
- Robert Hector White

=== Knights and Dames of the Order of St. John ===
- Richard Neville
- Her Honour Eva Qamaniq Aariak
- Robert Mark Frank, C.D., AdeC
- Edward David Hodgins
- The Right Honourable Richard Wagner, P.C.

=== Commanders of the Order of St. John ===
- Laurie Anne Anderson
- Robert Boily
- Travis Ryan Lanoway, C.D.
- Lawrence David Wong, C.D.
- N. Joel R. Campbell
- Major Jacques Coiteux, M.M.M., C.D.
- Susan Beth Davis
- Michael Kristian Dussault
- Harvey Fields
- Dany Houde
- John Macdonell
- Kevin Robert Edward McCormick
- Charles McVicker
- Ross Nicholls
- Andrew James Philpot
- Ellen Lac-Yenh So

=== Officers of the Order of St. John ===
- John David Broughton, C.D.
- Lisa Danielle Burke
- Po Kwan Tara Chan
- Brandon Fang
- Major Paul Ernest Jean Joseph Henry, C.D. (Retired)
- Patricia Katherine Kearney
- Stephen Lawrence Kern, C.D.
- Vicken Koundakjian
- Henri Levasseur, C.D., AdeC
- Jay Christopher Noden
- Kevin James Stinson
- Frederick Yim
- Brett W. J. Carr
- Colleen Anne Dell
- Lucie Houde
- Marie Corine Nadine Laflamme, C.D.
- Alec David Luker
- Stephanie Dawn Peachey
- Hulbert Paul Lindahl Silver

=== Members of the Order of St. John ===
- Yannick Bibeau
- Corporal Stephen Richard Brown
- Major-General Joseph Jean Guy Chapdelaine, O.M.M., C.D., Q.H.C.
- Louise Chauvet
- Brandon Richard Collision
- Brandon Eustacchio Disimine
- Master Corporal Andrew Patrick Finnigan
- Captain Mark Allan Gallant
- Cindy Hodson
- Ying Lei Huang
- Pierre La Voie
- Sherman Lip
- Caitlin Melyssa Loo
- Gloria D. Madden
- Christopher Robert Edward McCormick
- Warrant Officer Claire Paquet, C.D.
- Mario Paquette
- Jason Paul
- Lisa Courtney Paul
- Sergeant Lloyd David Payette, C.D. (Retired)
- Jonathan Pelletier-Bureau
- Nickolas Petuhoff
- Elvis Tavares Silva
- Douglas William Sirant
- Tiffany Sun
- Brian The
- Teresa Lynn Toutant
- Cassandra Nicole Trueman
- Angela Uta Walmsley
- Karen Lynn Wright
- Cimarron Sarna Ballantyne
- Katherine Michelle Bayer
- Jill Biggs
- Michele Marie Boriel
- Robert William Cunningham
- Marie Ida Sylvie Dupuis
- Sandra Marie Forward
- Jack Michael Hearn
- Morgan Elijah Janes
- Lieutenant-Colonel Paul Edward Joudrey, C.D. (Retired)
- Captain Brendan J. L'Heureux
- Jodi Anne McKean
- Edward Allan McNabb
- Haider Rizvi
- Jane Louise Smith
- Trevor Chase Sproule
- Ronald James Sullivan
- Alexandra Tardif-Morency
- Yick Nam Edison Ting
- Charles Veillette
- William T. Walker

== Provincial & Territorial Honours ==
=== National Order of Québec ===
==== Grand Officers of the National Order of Québec ====
Undress ribbon for a Grand Officer of the National Order of Québec

- Dr Michel Chrétien, OC, GOQ (This is a promotion within the Order)

==== Officers of the National Order of Québec ====
Undress ribbon for an Officer of the National Order of Québec

- M. Louis Audet
- Mme Joséphine Bacon
- M. François Crépeau
- Mme Sophie D'Amours
- M. Jean-François Lépine
- M. Pierre Karl Péladeau
- M. Samuel Pierre (This is a promotion within the Order)
- Dre Caroline Quach-Thanh
- M. Sidney Stevens
- M. Jean St-Gelais

==== Knight of the National Order of Québec ====
Undress ribbon for a Knight of the National Order of Québec

- M. Michel Bouvier
- M. Michel Clair
- M. Jean Pierre Desrosiers
- M. Vincent Dumez
- Mme Louise Forestier
- M. Gaëtan Gagné
- M. Alain-G. Gagnon
- Mme Louisiane Gauthier
- M. Michel Labrecque
- M. Pierre Lahoud
- Mme Suzanne Lareau
- Mme France Légaré
- M. Roland Lepage
- M. James A. O'Reilly
- M. Marc Parent
- Mme Léa Pool
- Mme Denise Robert
- Mme Francine Saillant
- Mme Anik Shooner
- M. René Simard
- M. Jean Soulard

=== Saskatchewan Order of Merit ===
- Wayne Brownlee
- Carol GoldenEagle
- Trevor Herriot
- John Hopkins
- Shirley Isbister, S.V.M.
- Harry Lafond
- Dr. Alan Rosenberg
- Marilyn Whitehead

=== Order of Ontario ===
- Dr. Dyane Adam, CM
- Cindy Adams
- Jordan Bitove
- Dr. Vanessa Burkoski
- Dr. Michael Cheng
- Dianne Cunningham
- Andre De Grasse
- Dr. Rhoda Howard-Hassmann, CM
- Dr. David Jenkins, OC
- Christina Jennings, CM
- Dr. Mohamed Lachemi
- Eric Lindros
- Arthur Lockhart
- Lorin MacDonald
- Christine Nesbitt
- Dr. Beverley Orser
- Pauline Shirt
- Dr. Frank Silver
- Dr. John Smol, OC, FRS, FRCS
- Dr. David Tannenbaum
- Biagio Vinci
- Dr. Ajay Virmani
- Dr. Padraig Warde
- Dr. MaryLynn West-Moynes
- Marva Wisdom
- Elizabeth Witmer

=== Order of British Columbia ===
- Dr. Nadine Rena Caron
- Chief Rosanne Casimir
- Nezhat Khosrowshahi
- Kathy Kinloch
- Joy MacPhail, C.M.
- Fred Ting Shek Mah
- Harinder Mahil
- Maureen Maloney, Q.C.
- Geoff Plant, Q.C.
- Christine Sinclair, O.C.
- Paul Spong
- Gerald St. Germain, P.C.
- Jody Wilson-Raybould, P.C., Q.C.
- Bruce Munro Wright

=== Alberta Order of Excellence ===
- Maureen Bianchini Purvis
- Robert Brawn
- M. Elizabeth Cannon
- Eleanor Chiu
- Cheryl Foggo
- Art Froehlich
- Cam Tait

=== Order of Prince Edward Island ===
- Dr. John Andrew
- Gary Schneider
- Claudette Thériault

=== Order of Manitoba ===
- Mohamed El Tassi
- Andre Lewis
- Andrew Paterson
- Shirley Richardson
- Darcy Ataman
- James Eldridge
- Doug Harvey
- Leo Ledohowski
- Megumi Masaki
- Alix Jean-Paul
- Marcy Markusa

=== Order of New Brunswick ===
- Jean-Claude Basque
- Cecile Cassista
- Randy Dickinson, C.M.
- Penny Ericson
- Aurèle Ferlatte, C.M.
- Lucinda Flemer, O.C.
- Sandra Irving, O.C.
- Larry Nelson, O.C.
- Valois Robichaud
- Robert Sylliboy

=== Order of Nova Scotia ===
- Col. John Boileau, C.D.
- Kenzie MacNeil
- Rustum Southwell
- Dr. Robert Strang
- Hope Swinimer

=== Order of Newfoundland and Labrador ===
- Robert W. Cormier, C.M.
- Dr. Catherine Donovan
- Alan Doyle, C.M.
- Dr. Janice Fitzgerald
- Carla Emerson Furlong
- Joseph Goudie
- Dr. Proton Rahman
- Maxwell Short

=== Order of Nunavut ===
The Order of Nunavut was not awarded in 2022.

=== Order of the Northwest Territories ===
- Jane Dragon
- Richard Van Camp
- Suzette Montreuil

=== Order of Yukon ===
- Danny Joe
- Jeanne Beaudoin
- Murray Lundberg

== Meritorious Service Decorations ==
=== Meritorious Service Cross (Civil Division) ===
Undress ribbon for Meritious Service Cross in the civilian division

- Wanda Bedard, M.S.C.
- Sophia Grinvalds, M.S.C.
- Paul Grinvalds, M.S.C.
- Peter Warrack, M.S.C.
- Phyllis M. C. Webstad, M.S.C.

=== Meritorious Service Medal (Civil Division) ===
Undress ribbon for Meritious Service Medal in the civilian division

- Chris J. Adam, M.S.M.
- Brandon Arkinson, M.S.M.
- Angela Arnone, M.S.M.
- Mohammad H. Asadi Lari, M.S.M. (deceased)
- Christine Josiane Claudine Baïet-Lorin, M.S.M.
- Kehkashan Basu, M.S.M.
- Chief Superintendent Ghalib Bhayani, M.O.M., M.S.M.
- Jean Boileau, M.B., M.S.M.
- Walter M. P. Cami, M.S.M.
- Doug Chisholm, M.S.M.
- Evelyne Comte, M.S.M.
- Andrew D. Connors, M.S.M.
- René Dallaire, C.Q., M.S.M.
- Adrianne G. Dartnall, M.S.M.
- Seema David, M.S.M.
- Roopan David, M.S.M.
- Philippe Degroote, M.S.M.
- Peter Grant deMarsh, M.S.M. (deceased)
- Nevaeh Joey Denine, M.S.M. (deceased)
- Holly Denine, M.S.M.
- Gloria Dennis, M.S.M.
- Major Jean-Marie Dez, M.S.M.
- Marcel Claude Henri Diologent, M.S.M.
- Julie Devon Dodd, M.S.M.
- Nadine Francillon, M.S.M.
- Pierre Gagné, M.S.M. (deceased)
- Bryan G. Garber, M.S.M., C.D.
- Marlene V. Grass, M.S.M.
- Hervé Hoffer, M.S.M. (deceased)
- Nicole Hoffer, M.S.M.
- Marc Hull-Jacquin, M.S.M.
- Nancy Knowlton, M.S.M.
- Pierre Labine, M.S.M.
- Jacques Larivière, M.S.M.
- Yves Le Maner, M.S.M.
- Richard F. Lennert, M.S.M.
- Frédéric Leturque, M.S.M.
- Steve Ludzik, M.S.M.
- Kirstin Lund, M.S.M.
- David Martin, M.S.M.
- Gerard Francis McCarthy, M.S.M. (deceased)
- Ralph McLean, M.S.M.
- Bernard Milleville, M.S.M.
- Benoit Mottrie, M.S.M.
- Alexandre Sacha Noukhovitch, M.S.M.
- Barbara Pasternak, M.S.M.
- Rico (René) Perriard, M.S.M.
- Martine Pietrois, M.S.M.
- Shafique Pirani, M.S.M.
- Tony Priftakis, M.S.M.
- Nicole Provost, M.S.M.
- Jean-Pierre Puchois, M.S.M.
- Wayne Quinn, M.M.M., M.S.M., C.D.
- Alain Rioux, M.S.M.
- Corentin Rousman, M.S.M.
- Nik Semenoff, M.S.M.
- Pierre Sénéchal, M.S.M.
- Christophe Serieys, M.S.M.
- Erwin Ureel, M.S.M.
- Dell Marie Wergeland, M.S.M.

== Mention in Dispatches ==
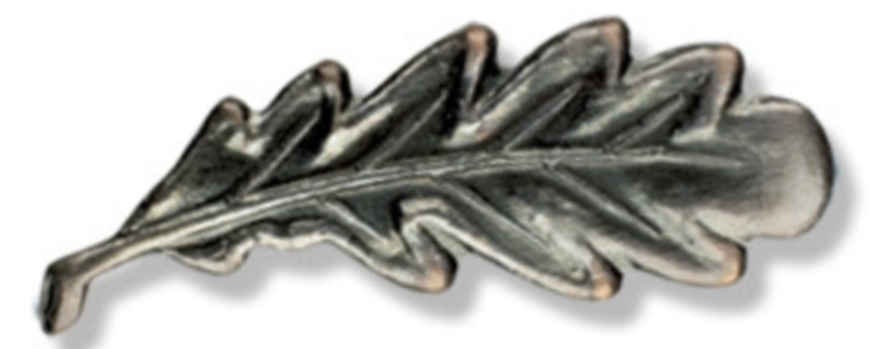
Undress ribbon devise for a Mention in Dispatches

- Captain PC Hanly
- Lieutenant(N) JE Love
- Sergeant E. Alexander
- Master-Corporal NJJP Audet-Larivée
- Corporal EL Galloway

== Commonwealth and Foreign Orders, Decorations and Medals awarded to Canadians ==
Source:

== From Her Majesty The Queen in Right of Australia ==
=== Bravery Medal ===
- Tyler White

== From Her Majesty The Queen in Right of Jamaica ==
=== Commander of the Order of Distinction ===
- Dr. Upton Dilworth Allen, O.Ont.

=== Badge of Honour for Meritorious Service ===
- Marsha Tanya Brown
- Carol Ivis Phillips

== From Her Majesty The Queen in Right of New Zealand ==
=== Member of the New Zealand Order of Merit ===
- Dr. Alison Patricia Barrett

== From His Majesty The King of Belgium ==
=== Commander of the Order of the Crown ===
- André Sincennes

=== Knight of the Order of the Crown ===
- Cathy Levy, C.M.

=== Golden Palms of the Order of the Crown (Labour Decoration, First Class) ===
- Jeannette Mazur
- Eric De Wallens

== From the President of the Federative Republic of Brazil ==
=== Grand Officer of the Order of the Aeronautical Merit ===
- Lieutenant-General Alexander Donald Meinzinger, C.M.M., M.S.M., C.D.

== From the President of the Republic of Colombia ==
=== Knight of the National Order of Merit ===
- Oscar Alfonso Morales Diaz

=== Marco Fidel Suárez Medal ===
- BGen. Patrice Laroche, O.M.M., C.D. (Retired)
- LCol. Forrest Glen Rock, M.S.C., C.D.
- LCol. Robert Malcolm Saunders, C.D.

=== Aguila de Gules Medal ===
- Capt. Duane John Lecaine, C.D. (Retired)
- Capt. Willem Werner Plikett, C.D.

=== "Fe en la Causa" de la Fuerza Aérea Colombiana Military Medal ===
- Master Warrant Officer Dennis Arthur Booker, C.D. (Retired)
- Capt. Glenn Wade Scott, C.D.

== From the President of the French Republic ==
=== Grand Officer of the National Order of the Legion of Honour ===
- Helen Vari, C.M.

=== Commander of the National Order of the Legion of Honour ===
- Hon. Antonine Maillet, P.C., C.C., O.Q., O.N.B.

=== Officer of the National Order of the Legion of Honour ===
- David Weisstub

=== Knight of the National Order of the Legion of Honour ===
- Hon. Joseph Michel Doyon, Q.C.
- Hon. Catherine McKenna, P.C.
- Donna Theo Strickland, C.C.
- Anthony Von Mandl

=== Officer of the National Order of Merit ===
- Louise Imbeault, O.N.B.
- Hon. Aldéa Landry, P.C., C.M., Q.C.

=== Knight of the National Order of Merit ===
- Erik Hougen
- Denis Racine
- Riva Walia

=== Commander of the Order of Academic Palms ===
- Paul Perron

=== Officer of the Order of Academic Palms ===
- Thierry Chopin

=== Knight of the Order of Academic Palms ===
- Odile Canadas
- Catherine Losier
- Francis Weil

=== Knight of the Order of Agricultural Merit ===
- Jean-Marc Guillot
- Serge Maury
- Olivier Perret
- Catherine Thomas
- Olivier Tourrette

=== Officer of the Order of Arts and Letters ===
- Michèle Boisvert, C.Q.
- Phil Comeau, C.M.
- Yannick Nézet-Séguin, C.C., O.Q.

=== Knight of the Order of Arts and Letters ===
- Joséphine Bacon
- Choi Chi Kin Calvin
- Thomas-Louis Côté
- Catherine Dalphond
- Marcelle Dubois
- Barbara Fischer
- Gregory Gallant
- Marcel Jean
- Odile Joannette
- Molly Johnson, O.C.
- Natasha Kanapé-Fontaine
- Marie-Andrée Lamontagne
- Louise Lapointe
- Hélène Laverdure
- Lisa Leblanc
- Dominique Lemieux
- Lisa Marlène Ntibayindusha
- Michel Rabagliati
- Rodney Saint-Eloi
- Stefan Saint-Laurent
- Marie-Jo Thério
- Alain Thibault
- Kim Thúy, C.Q.

=== National Defence Medal, Bronze Echelon ===
- Major-General Jean André Simon Bernard, O.M.M., C.D.
- Captain Peter Rudolf Stocker, M.S.M., C.D.

== From the President of Hungary ==
=== Officer's Cross of the Order of Merit of Hungary ===
- Emoke Jolán Erzsébet Szathmáry, C.M., O.M.

=== Knight's Cross of the Order of Merit of Hungary ===
- Frank Leo, Jr
- Tamás Ugray

=== Gold Cross of Merit of Hungary ===
- Tamás József Buday
- Pál Domby
- Éva Toldy

=== Silver Cross of Merit of Hungary ===
- Judith Ildikó Boda-Lázár

== From the President of the Italian Republic ==
=== Knight of the Order of the Star of Italy ===
- Phyllis Barbara Lambert, C.C., G.O.Q.

== From His Majesty The Emperor of Japan ==
=== Order of the Rising Sun, Gold Rays with Rosette ===
- Robert Keating

== From the President of the Republic of Korea ==
=== Civil Merit Medal ===
- Andrew Burtch
- Lee Yong Hwa

=== Korea Service Medal ===
- Maj. Casey William McLean, C.D.

== From the President of the Republic of Latvia ==
=== Order of the Three Stars, Fifth Class ===
- Lauma Stikuts

== From the President of the Republic of Poland ==
=== Knight's Cross of the Order of Polonia Restituta ===
- Paweł Piotr Korbel

=== Gold Cross of Merit ===
- Danuta Agnieszka Gumienik
- Teresa Maria Klimuszko

=== Cross of Freedom and Solidarity ===
- Regina Goman
- Wiktoria Karkuszewska
- Paweł Piotr Korbel
- Jacek Krzysztof Krzewski
- Krystyna Irena Sawicka
- Zbigniew Edward Sawicki

=== Medal of the Centenary of Polish Independence ===
- Zenon Tomasz Przybylak

== From His Majesty The King of Spain ==
=== Commander of the Order of Civil Merit ===
- Douglas Cardinal, O.C.

== From the President of Ukraine ==
=== Order of Merit, 3rd Class ===
- Jill Sinclair

== From the President of the United States of America ==
=== Officer of the Legion of Merit ===
- Brigadier-General Joseph Raoul Stéphane Boivin, O.M.M., M.S.C., C.D.
- Brigadier-General Jeannot Sylvain Emmanuel Boucher, O.M.M., M.S.M., C.D.
- Brigadier-General William Hilton Fletcher, O.M.M., S.M.V., C.D.
- Major-General Sylvain Yvon Ménard, M.S.M., C.D.

=== Legionnaire of the Legion of Merit ===
- (Acting) Commander Maureen E. Levy
- Colonel Kyle Christopher Paul, O.M.M., C.D.
- Colonel John Alan Roper, C.D.

=== Defence Meritorious Service Medal ===
- Lieutenant-Colonel Donna Lee Allen, C.D.
- Major David Carl Andrews, C.D.
- Lieutenant-Colonel Joseph Martin Arsenault, C.D.
- Captain David Theodore Berardo, C.D.
- Lieutenant(N) Olivier Boucher
- Lieutenant(N) Philip William Bowman, C.D.
- Lieutenant-Colonel Michael Anthony Campbell, C.D.
- Major Andrew N. Champion, C.D.
- Lieutenant-Colonel Peter Chan, C.D.
- Major Tracie Lynne Constable, C.D. (Retired)
- Lieutenant-Colonel René Hugo Delisle, C.D.
- Master Warrant Officer Raymond Denis Ethier, C.D.
- Lieutenant-Colonel Michael Thomas S. Fawcett, O.M.M., C.D.
- Master Corporal Martine Marie Danielle Fortier
- Sergeant Graham John Frampton, C.D.
- Lieutenant-Colonel Thomas Joseph Gale, C.D.
- Major David William Garvin, C.D.
- Captain Anthony Gauthier-Imbeault, C.D.
- Lieutenant-Colonel Robert Glenn Hart, C.D.
- Lieutenant-Colonel David Jeffery Holtz, C.D.
- Captain Alexandre Emile Labranche
- Lieutenant(N) Ludivine Myriam Michèle Laperrière, C.D. (Retired)
- Major Gary Philip Lawlor, C.D.
- Warrant Officer François Joseph Raymond Le Brun, C.D.
- Lieutenant-Colonel Nicolas J. Lussier-Nivischiuk, C.D.
- Master Warrant Officer Richard John Martin, M.M.M., C.D.
- Major Leonard Larry Matiowsky, C.D.
- Major Keith Rodney McCharles, C.D.
- Major Mark Steven Noel, C.D.
- Major Daniel Anthony O'Connor, C.D.
- Lieutenant-Colonel Richard Gregory Palfrey, C.D.
- Lieutenant-Commander Ji-Hwan Park, C.D.
- Captain Ripley James Pennell, C.D.
- Major Elmar Alberto Pinto Canas
- Sergeant Elissa J. Purvis
- Major Joseph Armand Guillaume Robert, C.D.
- Staff Sergeant Ronald E. Rose
- Chief Petty Officer 2nd Class Derrick Alexander Roulston, M.M.M., C.D.
- Major Virginia Shea, C.D.
- Lieutenant-Colonel Adam Nicholas Siokalo, C.D.
- Major Andrew Jeffrey Skinner, C.D.
- Master Corporal Travis William Sutherland
- Supt. Jeffrey S. Thompson
- Major Christopher David Vernon, C.D.
- Commander Michael William Walker, C.D.
- Colonel Leonard Matthew Wappler, C.D.
- Major Christian Dominik Whelan, C.D.
- Lieutenant-Colonel John Thomas Williams, C.D.
- Major-General Michael Charles Wright, M.M.V., M.S.M., C.D.
- Lieutenant-Colonel Howard Ho Kwan Yu, C.D.

=== Meritorious Service Medal ===
- Major Andrew A. Baier, C.D.
- Major Michael Bioletti, C.D.
- Lieutenant-Commander Derek Shawn Booth, C.D.
- Major Émilie Circé, C.D.
- Colonel Robbin Dale Dove, C.D.
- Colonel Bryn Elliott, C.D.
- Major Michael Paul Garrett
- Major Simon Pierre Charles Germain, C.D.
- Major David Austin McNiff, C.D.
- Major Wayne Andrew O'Donnell, C.D.
- Major Marc Antoine R. Parent, C.D.
- Colonel Christopher Michael Shapka, C.D.

=== Air Medal, Fifth Oak Leaf Cluster ===
- Major David Austin McNiff, C.D.

=== Air Medal, Second Oak Leaf Cluster ===
- Lieutenant-Colonel Shawn Alexander Guilbault, C.D.
- Master Corporal Teal William James Smith, C.D.

=== Air Medal, First Oak Leaf Cluster ===
- Major David Joshua Foyers, C.D.
- Sergeant Douglas John James, C.D.
- Captain Kevin John Long, C.D.
- Major Stephen Angus McLean, C.D.

=== Air Medal ===
- Master Corporal Imre Janos Kurt Glaser-Hille, C.D.
- Major Gary Philip Hartzenberg, C.D.
- Corporal Nathan Adam Lewis
- Sergeant Michael Thomas Nesbitt, C.D.

== From the North Atlantic Treaty Organization (NATO) ==
=== NATO Meritorious Service Medal ===
- Commodore Marcel Joseph Michel Hallé, O.M.M., C.D.

=== NATO Non-Article 5 Medal for the ISAF Operation ===
- Lee Randall Heard, C.D.
