= Razvan Preotu =

Canadian chess grandmaster (born 1999)

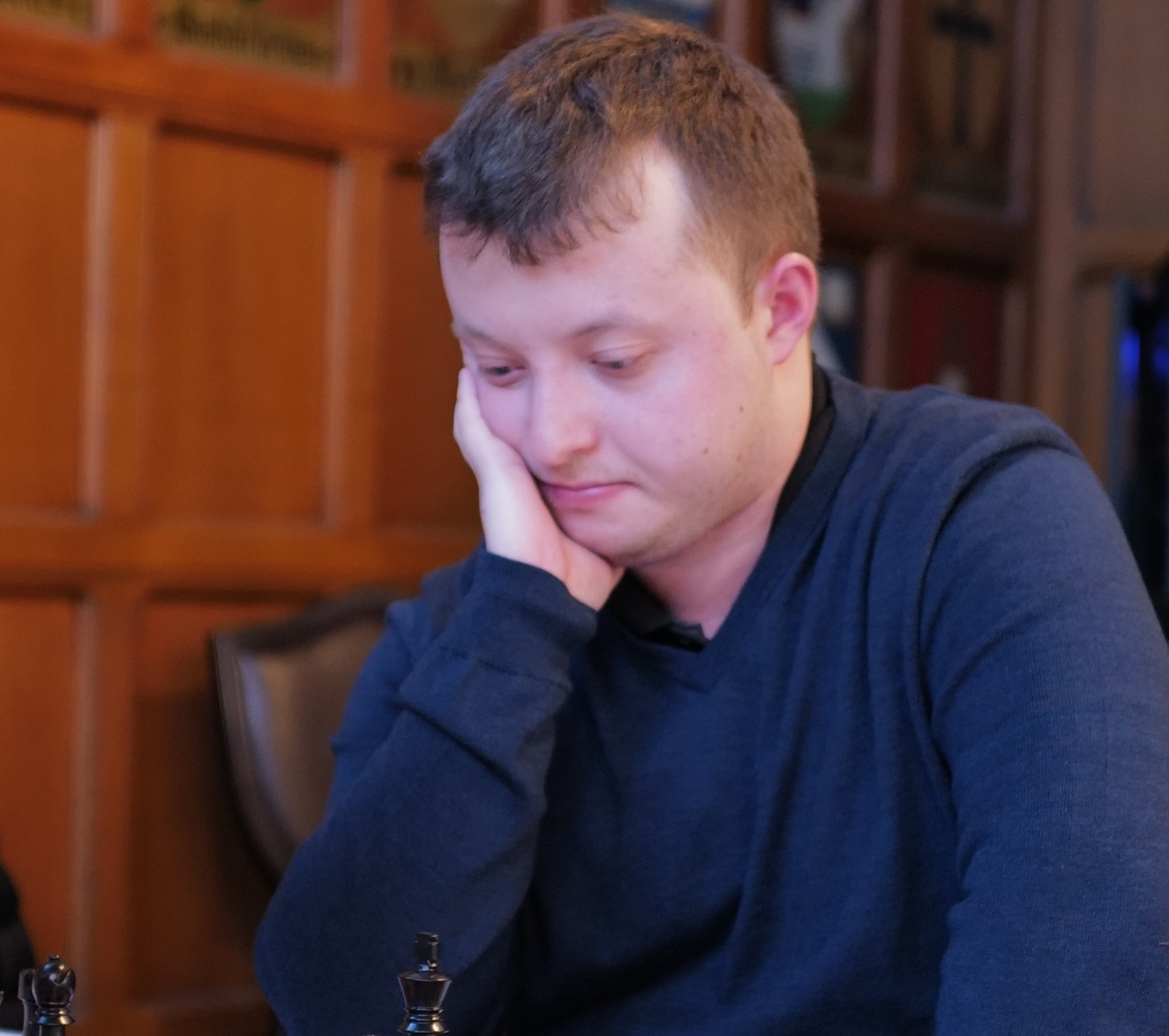
- Razvan Preotu at Hart House, 2023.

Personal information
- Born: August 11, 1999 (age 26) Toronto, Ontario, Canada

Chess career
- Country: Canada
- Title: Grandmaster (2016)
- FIDE rating: 2482 (July 2026)
- Peak rating: 2527 (March 2019)

Razvan Preotu (born August 11, 1999, in Toronto, Ontario) is a Canadian chess grandmaster.

== Early life, family, and education ==
Preotu is the son of Rene and Gabriela Preotu, who came to Canada from Romania in 1998. The family settled in Toronto, and moved to nearby Burlington, Ontario in 2003. Razvan graduated from Dr. Frank J. Hayden Secondary School in the summer of 2017 and completed his master's degree in computer science at The University of Texas at Dallas. He was awarded a chess scholarship and was a member of the university chess team for 6 years.

== Chess career ==
=== Early years, coaches ===
Razvan's first coach was his father Rene, a class B / Category II player, who is also a FIDE chess Arbiter. His first organized tournament was at age seven—the Grade 2 Chess'n Math Association event in Toronto, in 2007. Razvan studied with National Master Michael Egorov, a Hamilton, Ontario resident. He then began to work online with Romanian Grandmaster George-Gabriel Grigore. Upon Grigore's retirement from coaching chess, Razvan worked with another Romanian GM Gergely-Andras-Gyula Szabó, until summer 2016.

=== Early successes ===
==== Three straight national titles ====
Razvan won the Canadian Chess Challenge three consecutive times, for his grade 8, grade 9, and grade 10 years, in 2013, 2014, and 2015. This annual event, organized by the Chess'n Math Association, is Canada's national grade school championship, bringing together all of the provincial champions.

==== FM title ====
Upon attaining a FIDE rating of 2300, Razvan was awarded the FIDE Master (FM) title in 2013, at age 14.

=== International Master ===
Razvan scored his first International Master (IM) norm at the 2013 North American Open in Las Vegas. He earned his first win over a Grandmaster when he defeated Bator Sambuev, a Canadian Olympic team member, at the 2013 Guelph Pro-Am. He made his second IM norm at the 2014 World Open at Arlington, Virginia; this was also a Grandmaster norm. He attained his third and final required IM norm at the 2014 U.S. Masters and was awarded the title by FIDE later that year, as his FIDE rating had topped 2400.

=== Grandmaster ===
Razvan achieved his second GM norm at the 2014 SPICE Cup, in St Louis, Missouri. He made his third and final required GM norm at the 2016 World Open in Philadelphia. One final step still remained before he could formally be awarded the GM title: the minimum 2500 rating, and Razvan completed this with his draw against GM Gata Kamsky in round five of the 2016 Washington, D.C. International. Razvan was granted the GM title during the 2016 FIDE Congress at Baku, Azerbaijan, in early September 2016, becoming the second youngest Canadian-born GM.

=== Notable tournament results ===
Razvan played board one for Canada at the 2014 World Youth U16 Olympiad; Canada placed fifth. He won the U16 Canadian title in 2015 and placed sixth at the 2015 World Youth Chess Championship for U16. In January 2023, Preotu tied for first place with GM Olexandr Bortnyk at the Charlotte Open. Razvan won the championship at the 2016 Calgary International, ahead of five GMs, becoming the first Canadian to win this title outright. He also won the 2018 Quebec Open with an undefeated 7.5/9, including wins over 2nd and 4th place GMs Edouard and Mikhalevskyi. In 2021 he qualified to the Chess World Cup in Sochi, Russia where he played against Nodirbek Yakubboev in the first round. Razvan was part of Team Canada at the 2018 Chess Olympiad, Batumi, Georgia, and 2022 Chess Olympiad, Chennai, India. As of February 1, 2023, Razvan is currently the #2 ranked Canadian for FIDE rating, behind GM Eric Hansen.

==== Chess writer ====
He has written articles for Chess Canada magazine, and recently released a book.

== Books ==
- Michael Song, Razvan Preotu, Foreword by Evgeny Bareev. 2017. The Chess Attacker's Handbook. Gambit Publications.
