= Charles Elliott =

Charles Elliott may refer to:

- Charles Elliott, pen-name of Christopher Ewart-Biggs (1921–1976)
- Charlie Elliott (Charles Standish Elliott, 1912–2004), English cricketer and umpire
- Charles Elliott (New Zealand politician) (1811–1876), New Zealand politician
- Charles Elliott (Australian politician) (1870–1938), member of the Western Australian Legislative Council
- Sir Charles Alfred Elliott (1835–1911), lieutenant governor of Bengal
- Charles B. Elliott (1861–1935), American jurist
- Charles Bernadou Elliott (1882–1958), US Army colonel
- Charles Boileau Elliott (1803–1875), English cleric and travel writer
- Charles Elliott (footballer) (1896–1940), English footballer
- Charles Irving Elliott (1892–1972), pioneer aviator in the Hawaiian Islands
- Charles Loring Elliott (1812–1868), American portrait painter
- C. Thomas Elliott (born 1939), English physicist
- Charles W. Elliott, British Columbia First Nations woodcarver

== See also ==
- Charles Eliot (disambiguation)
- Charles Elliot (1801–1875), British Royal Navy officer, diplomat, and colonial administrator
- Charles Elliot (Royal Navy officer, born 1818) (1818–1895), British admiral
