= Shaw Centre =

Shaw Centre can refer to:

- Shaw Centre (Ottawa), a conference centre in Ottawa, Ontario
- Shaw Center for the Arts, a performing art venue, fine arts museum, and education center in Baton Rouge, Louisiana.
- Shaw Centre for the Salish Sea, an aquarium and cultural learning centre in Sidney, British Columbia
- Shaw House and Centre, a commercial and shopping complex in Singapore
- Shaw Conference Centre, a conference centre in Edmonton, Alberta
