= Faculties and departments of the University of Alberta =

The following is a list of the faculties and departments of the University of Alberta.

== Main Campus ==
=== Agriculture ===
- Faculty of Agricultural, Life and Environmental Sciences (AFHE)
  - Department of Agricultural, Food and Nutritional Science (AFNS)
  - Devonian Botanic Garden
  - Department of Human Ecology
  - Department of Renewable Resources
  - Department of Rural Economy

=== Arts ===
- Faculty of Arts
  - Department of Anthropology
  - Department of Art and Design
  - Arts Resource Centre
  - CSL Community Service-Learning
  - Department of Drama
  - Department of East Asian Studies
  - Department of Economics
  - Department of English and Film Studies
  - Department of History and Classics
  - Office of Interdisciplinary Studies
    - Comparative Literature Program
    - Humanities Computing Program (HUCO)
    - Middle Eastern and African Studies Program (MEAS)
    - Peace and Post-Conflict Studies Program
    - Religious Studies Program
    - Science, Technology and Society Program (STS)
  - Department of Linguistics
  - Department of Modern Languages and Cultural Studies (MLCS)
  - Department of Music
  - Department of Philosophy
  - Department of Political Science
  - Department of Psychology
  - Department of Sociology
  - Women's Studies Program

=== Business ===
- School of Business
  - Department of Accounting and Management Information Systems (AMIS)
  - Department of Finance and Management Science (FMS)
  - Department of Marketing, Business Economics, and Law (MABEL)
  - Department of Strategic Management and Organization (SMORG)

=== Education ===
- Faculty of Education
  - Department of Educational Policy Studies
  - Department of Educational Psychology
  - Department of Elementary Education
  - Department of Secondary Education
  - Division of Technology in Education (DTE)
  - School of Library and Information Studies (SLIS)

=== Engineering ===
- Faculty of Engineering
  - Department of Chemical and Materials Engineering (CME)
  - Department of Civil and Environmental Engineering
    - School of Mining and Petroleum Engineering
  - Department of Electrical and Computer Engineering (ECE)
  - Department of Mechanical Engineering
  - Engineering Co-op Program

=== Extension ===
- Faculty of Extension
  - Applied Sciences Programs
  - Business Programs
  - Adult and Continuing Education Programs
  - Communications and Technology Programs (MACT)
  - English Language Programs (ELP)
  - Government Studies Programs
  - Liberal Studies Programs
  - Medical Acupuncture Program

=== Graduate Studies ===
- Faculty of Graduate Studies and Research (FGSR)
  - Professional Development Programs
  - University Teaching Program (UTP)
  - University of Alberta Outreach

=== Law ===
- Faculty of Law

=== Medicine ===
- Faculty of Medicine and Dentistry
  - Division of Anatomy
  - Department of Anaesthesiology and Pain Medicine
  - Department of Biochemistry
  - Department of Biomedical Engineering
  - Department of Cell Biology
  - Centre for Neuroscience
  - Division of Critical Care Medicine
  - Department of Dentistry
  - Department of Family Medicine
  - Health Ethics Centre
  - Department of Laboratory Medicine & Pathology
  - Department of Medical Genetics
  - Department of Medical Microbiology and Immunology
  - Department of Medicine
  - Department of Obstetrics & Gynaecology
  - Department of Oncology
  - Department of Ophthalmology
  - Department of Paediatrics
  - Department of Pharmacology
  - Division of Physical Medicine and Rehabilitation
  - Department of Physiology
  - Department of Psychiatry
  - Department of Radiology and Diagnostic Imaging
  - Department of Surgery

=== Native Studies ===
- Faculty of Native Studies

=== Nursing ===
- Faculty of Nursing

=== Pharmacy ===
- Faculty of Pharmacy and Pharmaceutical Sciences

=== Recreation ===
- Faculty of Physical Education and Recreation

=== Public health ===
- School of Public Health
  - Alberta Centre for Injury Control & Research
  - Centre for Health Promotion Studies
  - Department of Public Health Sciences

=== Rehabilitation ===
- Faculty of Rehabilitation Medicine
  - Department of Occupational Therapy
  - Department of Physical Therapy
  - Rehabilitation Research Centre
  - Department of Speech Pathology and Audiology
  - Centre for Studies in Clinical Education (CSCE)
  - Institute for Stuttering Treatment and Research (ISTAR)

=== Science ===
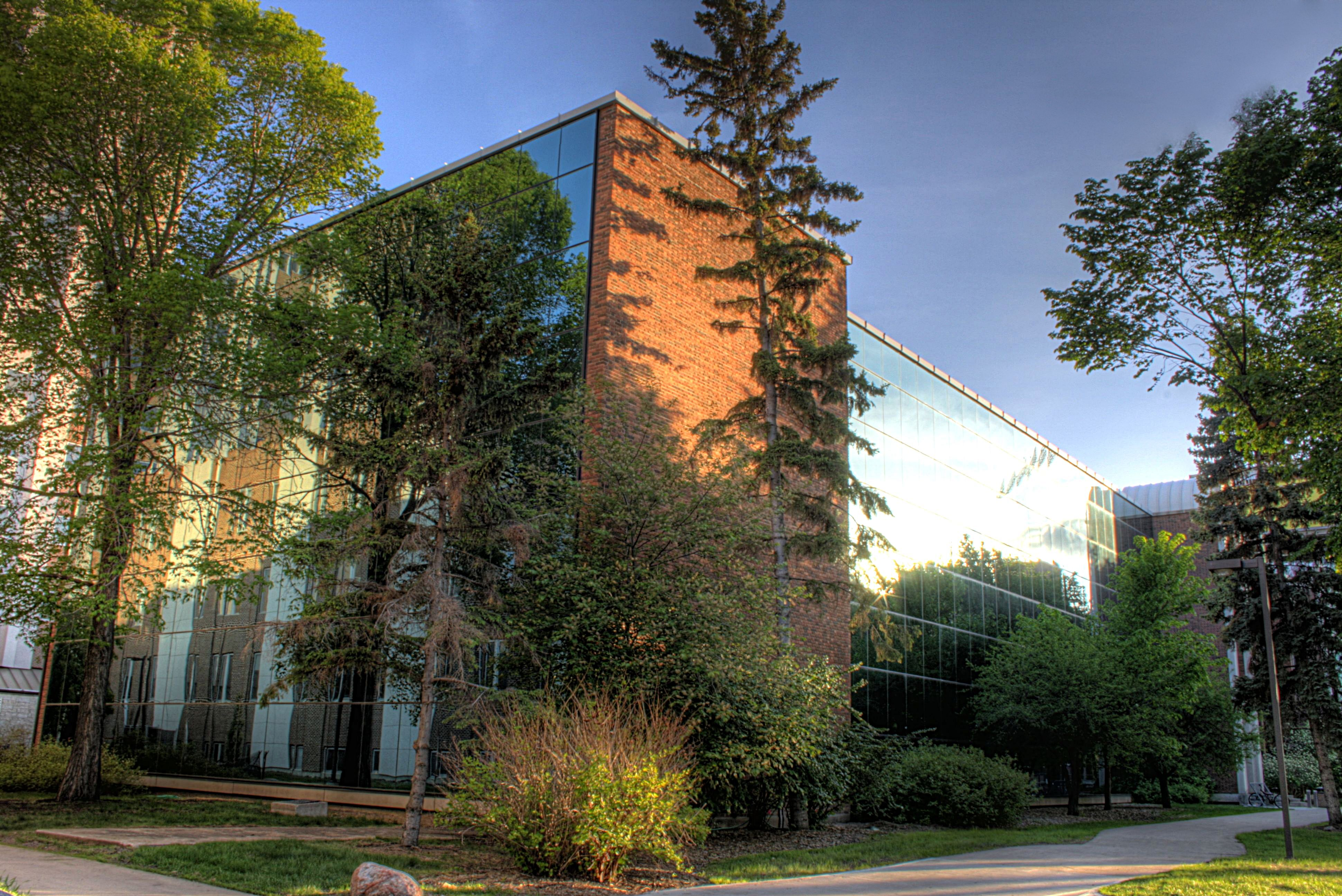
The Earth Sciences building

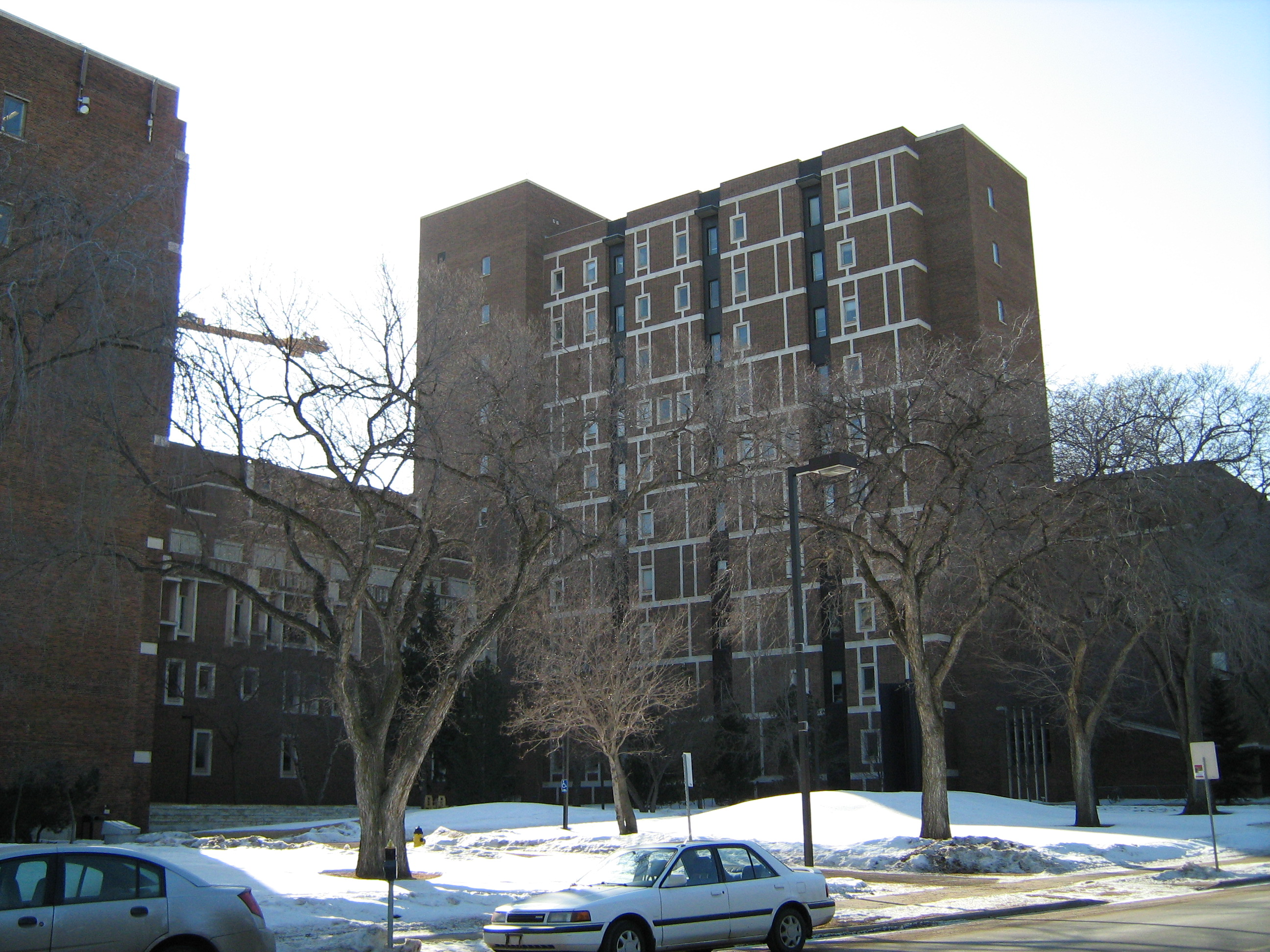
The Biological Sciences Building

- Faculty of Science
  - Department of Biological Sciences
  - Department of Chemistry
  - Department of Computing Science
  - Department of Earth & Atmospheric Sciences
  - Department of Mathematical and Statistical Sciences
  - Department of Physics
  - Department of Psychology

== Campus Saint-Jean ==
- Faculté Saint-Jean (FSJ)

== Augustana Campus ==
- Augustana Faculty
  - Department of Fine Arts
  - Department of Humanities
  - Department of Physical Education
  - Department of Science
  - Department of Social Sciences

== Affiliated colleges ==
- St. Joseph's College
- St. Stephen's College
