= Population Research Laboratory =

Research centre at the University of Alberta

Coordinates: 53.5281°N 113.5221°W

The Population Research Laboratory is a centre for social science research at the University of Alberta in Edmonton. It was established in 1966.

== See also ==
- Faculties and departments of the University of Alberta
- List of presidents of the University of Alberta
- List of chancellors of the University of Alberta
- List of agricultural universities and colleges
