= Shaw Centre for the Salish Sea =

Aquarium and science centre in Sidney, British Columbia, Canada

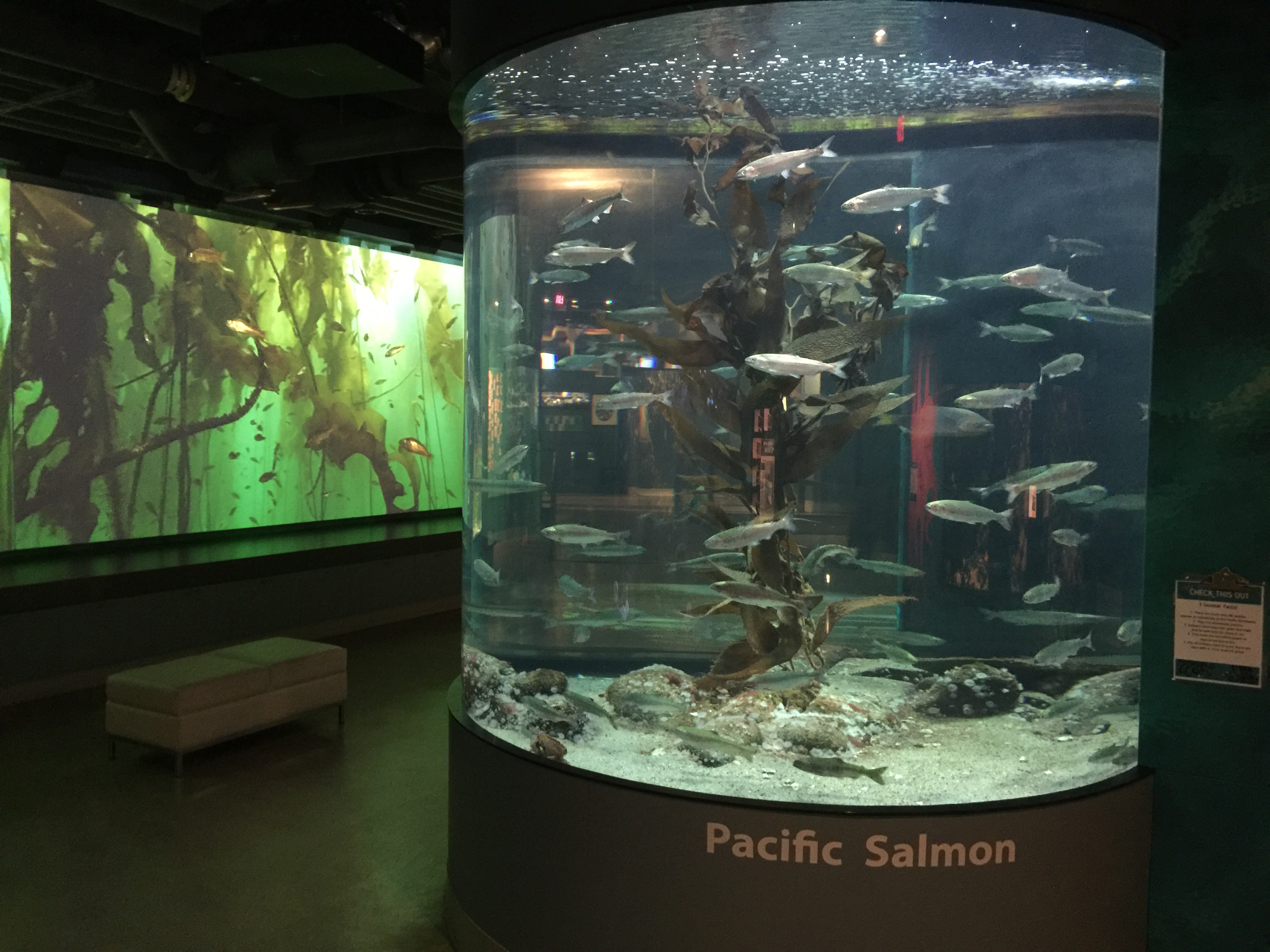
- Pacific salmon display
- Interactive map of Shaw Centre for the Salish Sea
- 48°38′57″N 123°23′42″W
- Date opened: June 20, 2009
- Location: Sidney, British Columbia, Canada
- Land area: 930 square metres (10,000 sq ft)
- Memberships: BCMA
- Website: www.salishseacentre.org

The Shaw Centre for the Salish Sea (formerly known as the Shaw Ocean Discovery Centre) is a not-for-profit community aquarium and cultural learning centre dedicated to the ecosystem of the Salish Sea. It is located on the waterfront in the town of Sidney on Vancouver Island in British Columbia, Canada. Since its grand opening on June 20, 2009, the Shaw Centre for the Salish Sea has become a highly regarded environmental education centre, as well as a popular attraction frequented by tourists and locals alike. The centre has won numerous awards, including being named "One of Canada's Top Ten New Attractions" for summer 2009 by Where magazine.

== History & Development ==
The development of the Shaw Centre for the Salish Sea started in 2004, when the Town of Sidney approved the development proposal to build the Sidney Pier Hotel and condominium project on a waterfront site overlooking Haro Strait. It was approved on the basis that the project would feature a series of community amenities, including 930 square metres (10,000 sq ft) of space on the ground floor that would be given to the town at no cost. Owned by the town, the space was originally intended to house the previously existing Marine Mammal Museum as well as the Marine Ecology Centre, however board members from both organizations agreed to work together to create a new marine attraction and education centre. This led to the establishment of the non-profit New Marine Centre Society on February 14, 2005.

The founding volunteer board, chaired by Owen Redfern, included geologists Dr. John Harper and Dr. Rick Hudson, local politicians Cliff McNeil-Smith and Clive Tanner, and biologist Rhonda Reidy, with later additions including marine biologist Dr. Verena Tunnicliffe, and Town of Sidney councilor Peter Wainwright serving as liaison to the council. A lease agreement was negotiated whereby the New Marine Centre Society would have use of the space, owned by the town, for a period of twenty years from 2009 to 2029, with an option for a further 10 year renewal. The society would be responsible for securing all capital and operational funding for what was then referred to as a "marine museum".

Throughout 2005, the board prepared a business plan, conducted a survey of other facilities, engaged in community consultations and developed a vision statement. In November 2005 the board hired Angus Matthews to assess the information the board had acquired and provide concept for the new facility. Matthews became a catalyst for action and presented the board with a proposal for a $5 million aquarium of the Salish Sea. The concept was then introduced to the community at a meeting held at the Mary Winspear Centre on December 14, 2005. Matthews was appointed as the first executive director of the society. His mandate was to finalize the concept, produce plans and budgets for both construction and operations, direct and participate in the fundraising campaign, oversee construction of the facility, develop a branding, marketing and communications program, and have a fully operational aquarium staffed, stocked and ready to open in 31 months by June 20, 2009.

Early in 2006, founding board member and fundraising chair, Clive Tanner asked if community leaders and philanthropists, Murray and Lynda Farmer, would agree to co-chair a volunteer campaign cabinet to launch the Discover Your Ocean Campaign. With the Farmer's leadership, the campaign was launched in September 2006 and completed on April 20, 2009. Major donations to the fundraising campaign included a $2.5 million gift from the Shaw Charitable Committee, a $2 million grant from Canada/BC Rural Municipal Infrastructure Fund, and $1.5 million in private donations from individuals and companies in the Sidney area to reach the $5 million goal. When the contribution of the space is factored in, the entire project had a value of $8.5 million.

The project also received advice from a number of scientific and educational experts including Dr. Bill Austin and Sue Staniforth, along with Dr. John Nightingale and his staff at the Vancouver Aquarium. Matthews also worked closely Coast Salish elders including Tom Sampson, the late Earle Claxton, the late Ray Sam and John Elliott. The elders provided extensive advice regarding the Salish Sea and the First People's interactions and special relationships with the ocean and marine life through the generations.

Final design, based on Matthews' initial concept, was developed by Seattle-based aquarium designer James Peterson. The design was complex, spanning three levels on the ground floor of the Sidney Pier Building. All of the concrete walls in the space had to be worked around as they were key structural components of the building, meaning the aquarium's mechanical and public spaces were required to fit without modification. The floor required considerable reinforcement to support 87 tonnes of seawater the aquariums can hold.

Interior construction began on August 21, 2008. With the support and effort of remarkable trades people, artists and contractors the centre opened on time and under budget after just 10 months of construction. Coast Salish artist Charles Elliott was commissioned to produce a series of graphics that are reproduced throughout the centre, used in marketing materials and in the fish sculpture located outside the main entrance. Local glass artist Rick Silas produced the kelp panels featured in the lobby and bronze artist Paul Harder was commissioned to create the sea creatures featured in the outdoor tide pool in the waterfront park on the east side of the building. The freely assessable, outdoor tide pool feature associated with the aquarium, was a gift to the people of Sidney from the Gwyn Morgan & Patricia Trottier Family Foundation. Included in the construction schedule was time to test run the aquarium life-support systems as well as collect and introduce the animal collection to their habitats in preparation for opening.

Prior to the June 20, 2009, opening date, Matthews assembled a small staff to operate the aquarium, supported by over 170 volunteer "Oceaneers". Ranging in age from 8 to the top end of the age scale, the Oceaneers became the personality of the centre and essential to its operation and financial model. They participated in hours of training in preparation for the opening. The core Oceaneers came from the former Marine Mammal Museum or the Marine Ecology Centre, both of which had closed before the centre opened.

The Shaw name was permanently attached to the Shaw Centre for the Salish Sea prior to opening in recognition of the largest single gift to the project, $2.5 million from Shaw Communications. The centre was positioned as a self-supporting, entrepreneurial not-for-profit, environmental education centre focused on the wonders of the Salish Sea at the aquarium's doorstep.

On Saturday June 20, 2009, the Shaw Centre for the Salish Sea opened to the public after a ceremony led by Coast Salish elder Tom Sampson. Featured guests included local Members of Parliament and Legislative Assembly, W̱SÍ¸KEM Chief Vern Jacks, W̱JOȽEȽP council member Audrey Sampson, and special guest Céline Cousteau. During the outdoor ceremony, Coast Salish dancers and singers presented welcome and honour songs. The performers then led a large procession around the building with a traditional paddle song. The song is still used in the aquarium today with the permission of the Sampson family. After the ceremonial cutting of the kelp "ribbon" the first two visitors to enter the centre were two children, accompanied by Céline Cousteau. Once the darkened aquarium was full to capacity with invited guests, Phoenix, April and Céline Cousteau began to pour water from a large jug into a carved wooden bowl under a shaft of light while the Coast Salish members present blessed and dedicated the aquarium to understanding between peoples and shared respect for the ocean. As the water poured the lighting in the aquarium habitats was increased to reveal the wonders of the Salish Sea surrounding the assembly.

At noon the Shaw Centre for the Salish Sea opened to the public. Over 1,600 people visited the aquarium on the first weekend.

== Exhibits ==
Gallery of Drifters

This exhibit shows many species of jelly fish, plankton, and algae to help visitors understand the foundations of the ocean food web in the Salish Sea. Species in this exhibit include sea nettles and moon jellies.

Ocean's Heartbeat

This wet lab and classroom is used by school groups, though ordinary visitors are welcome when it is not in use. It contains microscopes for visitors to view the mini-ecosystems habitats, and a teacher's desk with a fish tank inside. The area is also used to house new-born fish and contain bones of whales. Lastly, the exhibit contains a 60-cm female fetus of a hybrid harbour and Dall's porpoise that was discovered from a dead female Dall's porpoise on Southern Vancouver Island in 1998.

Gallery of the Salish Sea

The centre is home to up to 3000 creatures at one time, with around 150 species of plant life, marine invertebrates, and fish. Most of these species are housed in the main Gallery of the Salish Sea, notably including wolf eels, and a giant Pacific octopus. Kept only for half a year, a single octopus inhabits the centre at a time, before they are released back into the waters they were caught from to complete their lifecycle and breed. During their time at the centre, the octopuses increase in size dramatically, and show distinct personalities that can be attributed to their high cephalopod intelligence.

Touch Pool

Using only one finger, in the touch pool, visitors can gently touch some of the Salish Sea's many invertebrates, including sea urchins, sea cucumbers, and sea stars, under the supervision of the centre's Oceaneers. The touch pool also provides a stunning view of the Southern Gulf Islands against the backdrop of Mount Baker, an active volcano. Hanging above the touch pool is the skeleton of northern resident orca A9, known as Eve or Scar, due to a marking behind her dorsal fin. A9 was the matriarch of her pod and was found dead in 1990. Her articulated remains are on display along with the skull of J18, or Everett, a southern resident orca. J18 died in 2000, and his death is attributed to the biomagnification of PCBs. The display includes signage explaining the impact of bioaccumulation and biomagnification within orcas of the Salish Sea.

Feature Gallery

The Feature Gallery found at the back of the centre has been occupied by various exhibits over the years. The centre's first fully in-house curated exhibit, Seaweed: Mysteries of the Amber Forests, opened on October 15th, 2022, and featured work from artists Josie Iselin and Sarah Jim, among others, artists. This exhibit showcased the often-ignored yet vital plant life of the ocean, and closed on January 10th, 2024.

The Drawing Connections Gallery, which opened on February 24th, 2024, celebrates 40 years of the name "Salish Sea" being attributed to waters in British Columbia and Washington State. It features eight artists, Bill Adams, Rob Butler, Peggy Frank, Mark Hobson, Briony Penn, Peggy Sowden, Anne Stewart, and Alison Watt, and celebrates the intersection between art and science in the local biosphere. The exhibit highlights coastal wetlands ecosystems and the animals that inhabit them, birds especially, and a wooden bird blind offers children the chance to spot local avian life in painted form.
