= George-Gabriel Grigore =

Romanian chess grandmaster (born 1970)

Personal information
- Born: November 13, 1970 (age 55) Constanța, Romania

Chess career
- Country: Romania
- Title: Grandmaster (2002)
- FIDE rating: 2412 (July 2026)
- Peak rating: 2558 (July 2009)

George-Gabriel Grigore is a Romanian chess grandmaster.

== Chess career ==
He was part of the winning team in the Romanian Team Championships in 1988, 1990, 1997, and 1999.

He finished in third place in the Romanian Chess Championships of 1993 and 1997, and in second place in the 2007 championship.

In 1997, he began working as a chess coach, and was one of the coaches of Canadian grandmaster Razvan Preotu.

He played for Romania in the 2000 and 2004 Chess Olympiads. In 2000, he played on board 3 and scored +2=6-1. In 2004, he played on board 2 reserve and scored +3=1-2.

He won the Brăilean Chess Festival in 2005 and 2006, and also won the senior edition of the festival twice.

== Personal life ==
He studied mathematics and computer science at the University of Bucharest.
