= University of Alberta Faculty of Rehabilitation Medicine =

- Type: Public
- Established: 1976; 50 years ago
- Dean: Dr. Robert Haennel
- Location: Edmonton, Alberta, Canada
- Website: rehabilitation.ualberta.ca

The University of Alberta Faculty of Rehabilitation Medicine, located in Edmonton, Alberta, Canada, is home to North America's only free-standing faculty of rehabilitation medicine and is composed of three departments, 11 research groups, six student clinics and programs and five institutes and centres. It provides academic training in rehabilitation science, physical therapy, occupational therapy and speech-language pathology.

The Faculty is currently headquartered in the historic Corbett Hall at the University of Alberta’s main campus and houses three departments: Department of Physical Therapy, Department of Occupational Therapy and Department of Communication Sciences and Disorders.

Current noteworthy research being conducted within the Faculty includes musculoskeletal health, neuroscience, children’s health, aging, military health and rehabilitation technology.

== History ==
The Faculty of Rehabilitation Medicine began as a training program for physical therapists in Alberta in 1954. Programs in occupational therapy and speech-language pathology were introduced later, in 1960 and 1969 respectively.

In 1964 it became the School of Rehabilitation Medicine. In March 1976 it was granted Faculty status. In 1969 it offered the first rehabilitation medicine degree: a Bachelor of Physical Therapy. The Faculty of Rehabilitation Medicine became the first institution in Canada to offer a graduate degree in physical therapy (MSc PT) in 1979. In 2014 the Department of Occupational Therapy launched the first MScOT satellite program in Canada. The list of leaders of the rehabilitation professions that have come from the Faculty of Rehabilitation Medicine includes the President of the World Federation of Occupational Therapy, the President of the Canadian Association of Occupational Therapy, the President of the Canadian Physical Therapy Association.

== Education ==
The Faculty currently offers five degree programs:

- Master of Science in Occupational Therapy (MSc OT): Occupational Therapy is the art and science of enabling engagement in everyday living, through occupation;of enabling people to perform the occupations that foster health and wellbeing; and of enabling a just and inclusive society so that all people may participate to their potential in the daily occupations of life .(Townsend and Polatajko, 2007 p. 372). Occupational therapists (OTs) apply their specific knowledge to enable people who have an injury, illness, disability or psychological dysfunction to engage in activities of daily living that have personal meaning and value. Students in occupational therapy come from across Canada, the US and around the world. The Department of Occupational Therapy also offers a post-professional masters program for occupational therapists who currently hold BSc degrees.
- Master of Science in Physical Therapy (MSc PT): Physical therapists (physiotherapists or PTs) help patients relieve pain, build strength, restore mobility and learn preventative strategies.
- Master of Science in Speech-Language Pathology (MSc SLP): Speech-language pathologists (SLPs) assess, diagnose, treat, and help to prevent disorders related to speech, language, cognition, voice, fluency, and swallowing.
- Master of Science in Rehabilitation Science (MSc RS): The MSc in Rehabilitation Science is a two-year thesis program that prepares students for a career in rehabilitation medicine research and academia.
- PhD in Rehabilitation Science (PhD RS): The PhD in Rehabilitation Science is a four-year research degree program designed to provide advanced research training in rehabilitation science.

A range of continuing professional education (CPE) programs for working clinicians are also offered.

== Campuses ==
Campuses include the University of Alberta’s Main Campus, Augustana Campus (Camrose, Alberta) and the Calgary Campus.

Through these campuses and a distributed education learning model, the Faculty is able to increase accessibility to education across the province.

Classes (lectures, seminars and labs) are delivered either face-to-face or by real-time web/video cast technology to view professors from other campuses. While the majority of classes are broadcast from Edmonton, faculty broadcast from all campuses throughout the program.

The Occupational Therapy program first self-funded a pilot program for 12 students in Calgary to address the need for engagement of preceptors and practitioners in Southern Alberta, and to meet occupational therapy needs in surrounding rural areas. After two cohorts, the program received permanent funding from the government and was relocated to the same building as the PT program. The OT program in Calgary now takes in 25 students each year.

== Institutes and clinics ==
=== Institutes and centres ===
- Glen Sather Sports Medicine Clinic: The Glen Sather Sports Medicine Clinic is a multi-faceted facility that serves the needs of active individuals through service, research and education. The Clinic provides specialized therapy; acts as a teaching clinic for students and clinicians from affiliated university faculties including Rehabilitation Medicine, Physical Education & Recreation and Medicine & Dentistry; and facilitates important and unique musculoskeletal (MSK) and sports medicine research.
- Institute for Stuttering Treatment and Research (ISTAR): ISTAR offers specialized treatment to children, teens and adults who stutter. They also conduct research into the different areas of stuttering and promote public awareness of stuttering and its treatment.
- Alberta Centre on Aging: The Alberta Centre on Aging promotes research, education, and service in aging, through interdisciplinary collaboration and through partnerships with stakeholders.
- Institute for Reconstructive Sciences in Medicine (iRSM): The Institute for Reconstructive Sciences in Medicine (iRSM) is a clinic and research institute focused on medical reconstructive sciences.
- Rehabilitation Research Centre (RRC): The RRC facilitates health-related research in rehabilitation process and study.

=== Clinics and programs ===
- Corbett Hall Student Physical Therapy Clinic: The Corbett Hall Student Physical Therapy Clinic is a non-profit clinic operated within the Department of Physical Therapy. Physical therapy students take primary responsibility for providing assessment or rehabilitation under the supervision of licensed physical therapists.
- Corbett Hall Speech-Language Clinic (Corbett Clinic): Students in the Master of Speech-Language Pathology program provide assessment and treatment for clients of all ages under the supervision of staff in the Department of Speech Pathology and Audiology.
- Corbett Hall Early Education Program (CHEEP): The Corbett Hall Early Education Program (CHEEP) provides preschool programming to children, aged two and a half to five years, diagnosed with developmental delays.
- Occupational Performance Analysis Unit (OPAU): OPAU is a not-for-profit clinical service unit of the Faculty of Rehabilitation Medicine at the University of Alberta that provides rehabilitation services on a fee-for-service basis. Rehabilitation services are provided for individuals who have difficulty participating in: self-care; leisure, recreation, and fitness; employment or school; housekeeping and parenting; and the life of their community.

== Research ==
The Faculty of Rehabilitation Medicine is home to the Canada Research Chair (CRC) in Spinal Cord Injury, as well as the Associate Research Chair in Clinical Rehabilitation, Chair in Military and Veterans’ Clinical Rehabilitation, Research Chair in Stuttering, and David Magee Endowed Chair in Musculoskeletal Clinical Research.

There are 11 research groups in total:

- Bariatric Care and Rehabilitation Research Group
- Behavioural Supports Alberta
- Child and Adolescent Research Group (CARG)
- Clinic for Ambulatory Rehabilitation Research and Education (CARRE)
- Collaborative for Scholarship in Clinical Education (CSCE)
- Collaborative Orthopaedic Research (CORe)
- Common Spinal Disorders Research Group
- Decision Making Capacity Assessment (DMCA) Research Group
- Family and Disability Studies Initiative
- Rehabilitation Robotics
- Special Interest Group on Aging

Other areas of research include:

- Sexuality and disability
- Environmental interventions for sleep
- Applications of technologies to health care services for older adults in the community and Universal Design
- Health and occupational performance of musicians
