= Charles Eliot =

Charles Eliot may refer to:

- Charles William Eliot (1834–1926), American academic; president of Harvard (1869–1909)
- Charles Eliot (landscape architect) (1859–1897), American landscape architect
- Charles W. Eliot II (1899–1993), American landscape architect
- Sir Charles Eliot (diplomat) (1862–1931), British diplomat and colonial administrator
- Charles William John Eliot (1928–2008), Canadian academic and university administrator

== See also ==
- Charles Elliot (1801–1875), British Royal Navy officer, diplomat, and colonial administrator
- Charles Elliot (Royal Navy officer, born 1818) (1818–1895), British admiral
- Charles Elliott (disambiguation)
