= C. Céleste Johnston =

Canadian neonatal pain researcher

C. Céleste Smith Johnston (born 1946) is a Professor Emerita in the Ingram School of Nursing at McGill University’s Faculty of Medicine. Johnston's research focused on the measurement and non-pharmacological management of pain in preterm neonates.

She completed a Bachelor of Nursing (1970) and a Doctor of Education (1979) at McGill University.

Johnston was previously the past-President of the Canadian Pain Society, and in 2021 was appointed as an Officer of the Order of Canada for "her foundational research in neonatal pain and for further advancing the field as a beloved mentor."

== Publications ==
- Stevens, B., Johnston, C., Petryshen, P., & Taddio, A. (1996). Premature infant pain profile: development and initial validation. The Clinical journal of pain, 12(1), 13–22.
- Johnston, C., Barrington, K. J., Taddio, A., Carbajal, R., & Filion, F. (2011). Pain in Canadian NICUs: have we improved over the past 12 years?. The Clinical journal of pain, 27(3), 225–232.
- Johnston, C. C., & Stevens, B. J. (1996). Experience in a neonatal intensive care unit affects pain response. Pediatrics, 98(5), 925–930.
- Johnston, C., Campbell-Yeo, M., Disher, T., Benoit, B., Fernandes, A., Streiner, D., ... & Zee, R. (2017). Skin-to-skin care for procedural pain in neonates. Cochrane Database of Systematic Reviews, (2).
