= Gergely-Andras-Gyula Szabó =

Romanian chess grandmaster (born 1983)

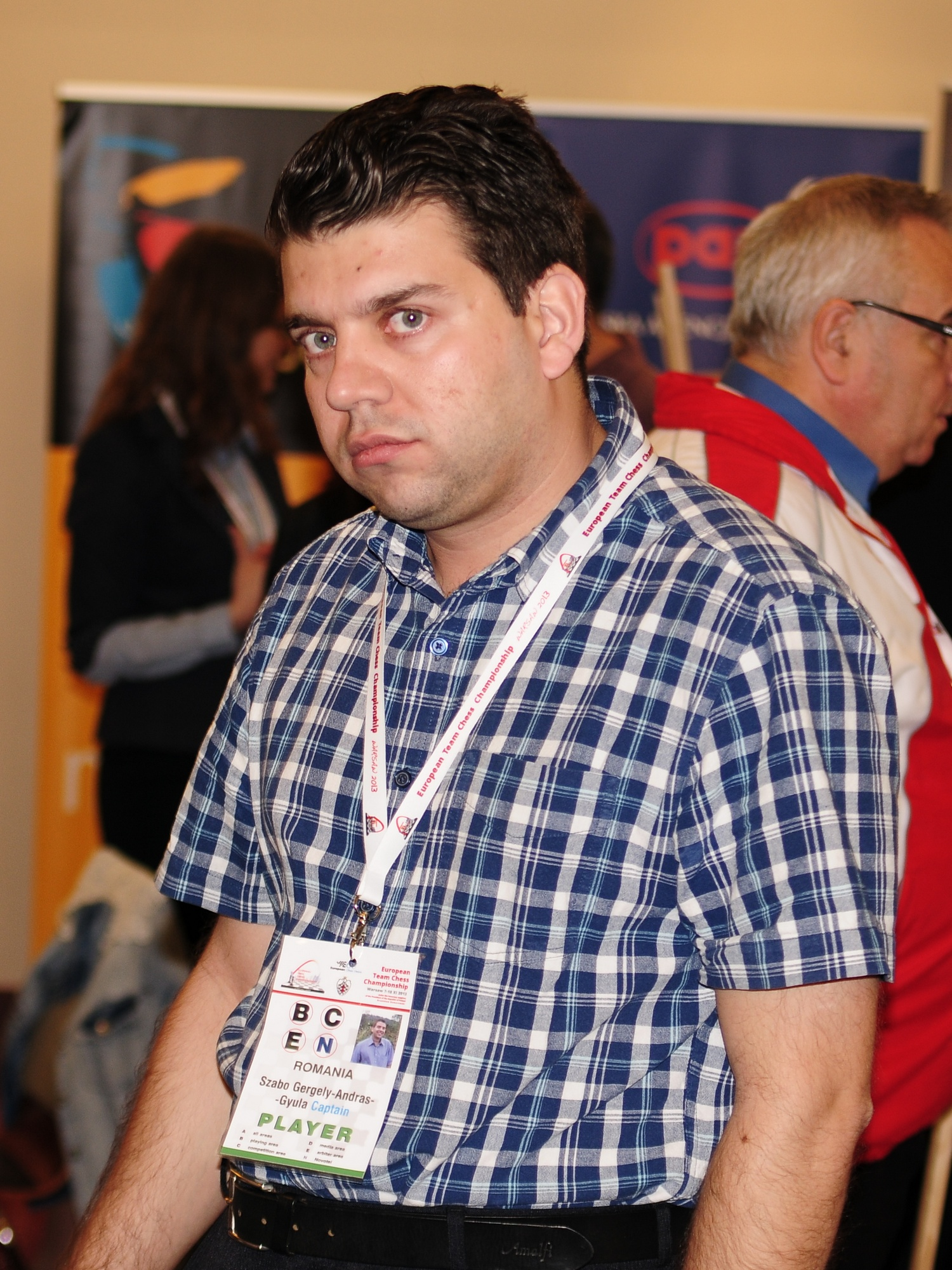

Personal information
- Born: April 13, 1983 (age 43) Bucharest, Romania

Chess career
- Country: Romania
- Title: Grandmaster (2010)
- FIDE rating: 2483 (July 2026)
- Peak rating: 2568 (July 2010)

Gergely-Andras-Gyula Szabó is a Romanian chess grandmaster.

== Chess career ==
He was awarded the Grandmaster title in 2010, achieving his norms at the:

- Victor Ciocaltea Memorial GM in April 2009
- Balkan GP International Chess Festival BH Telecom in May 2009
- XXII Trofej Beograda in December 2009

In 2022, he and Victoria Doknjas founded the Juniors to Masters Chess Academy, which offers a training program for promising Canadian juniors.

In February 2023, he played a notable game against Nicodum-Cosmin Stepanescu in the sixth round of the Romanian Chess Championship, which was touted as a candidate for "Game of the Year". He finished the championship in 10th place.

He coached the 2014 Canadian U16 Olympiad team, 2018 Canadian Women's Olympiad team, and the 2024 Romanian Women's Olympiad team.
