= Frank Hayden =

Canadian academic (1930–2026)

Frank Hayden CC OOnt
- Born: January 11, 1930; Windsor, Ontario, Canada
- Died: May 16, 2026 (aged 96); Oakville, Ontario, Canada
- Occupation: Academic
- Known for: Legally incorporated "Special Olympics Inc"

Frank Joseph Hayden CC OOnt (January 11, 1930 – May 16, 2026) was a Canadian physical education and kinesiology academic, and a pioneer of the Special Olympics from Oakville, Ontario.

== Background ==
Hayden was born in Windsor, Ontario on January 11, 1930 and lived in Burlington. He completed his Bachelor of Arts (BA) at the University of Western Ontario in 1955, and a Master of Science (MS) in 1958 and Doctor of Philosophy (PhD) in 1962 at the University of Illinois at Urbana–Champaign, with a major that combined exercise with psychology. Hayden joined the faculty of the University of Western Ontario in 1964, then became director of the School of Physical Education and Athletics at McMaster University in 1975. He retired from McMaster in 1988. He died in Oakville, Ontario on May 16, 2026, at the age of 96.

== Special Olympics ==
While at Western in the early 1960s, Hayden researched fitness programs for disabled children. While working at the School of Physical and Health Education (now Kinesiology and Physical Education) at the University of Toronto, he was advised by his supervisor about an available grant to investigate the fitness and motor skills of children with intellectual disabilities. Following his supervisor's advice Hayden discovered there was very little information published on this topic; as he later told the Canadian Encyclopedia, he realized that he could become an "instant expert". Hayden pioneered the idea that people with intellectual or developmental disabilities, such as autism or Down syndrome, could benefit greatly from physical activities increasing their mental and physical capacities.

His research titled Physical fitness for the mentally retarded : a manual for teachers and parents published in 1964 became known to Mrs. Eunice Shriver, sister of former U.S. President John F. Kennedy, at the Joseph P. Kennedy Jr. Foundation; for two years Hayden helped produce and build a fitness program and establish legislation to accommodate persons with disabilities.

In 1968, he and Shriver organized the first Chicago Inaugural Special Olympics with the Kennedy Foundation and the Chicago Park District, and legally incorporated Special Olympics Inc. The event drew participating athletes from 25 states as well as a Canadian floor hockey team. He then established roughly 50 additional Special Olympics organizations worldwide. Today this program supplies training and friendly rivalry for more than three million athletes with disabilities in over 170 countries. Hayden served as executive director of the Special Olympics from 1968 to 1972, founded and led the Office of European Affairs for Special Olympics International in Paris from 1988 to 1990, and was a special consultant to the Canadian Special Olympics from 1994 to 2000.

== Honours ==
Hayden was appointed an Officer of the Order of Canada (OC) in 2000, and promoted to Companion of the Order of Canada (CC) by former governor general Michaelle Jean on behalf of Gov. Gen. Mary Simon in the 2022 Canadian honours. He was appointed a Member of the Order of Ontario (OOnt) in 2012. A plaque in his honour was unveiled outside his former laboratory in Thames Hall at Western University in April 2012. He also received the Queen Elizabeth II Golden Jubilee Medal, the Queen Elizabeth II Diamond Jubilee Medal, and the King Charles III Coronation Medal.

Dr. Frank J. Hayden Secondary School in Burlington, Ontario was named in his honour in 2013. In 2016 he was awarded the Order of Sport, marking his induction into Canada's Sports Hall of Fame. He received honorary degrees from McMaster University (1997), the University of Calgary (1988), the University of Toronto (1999), Saint Mary's University, Halifax (2004), the University of Western Ontario (2011), and Memorial University of Newfoundland (2017).

== Accolades ==
Gail Hamamoto, Special Olympics Canada CEO, stated that Hayden's work opened doors for people.

"Frank Hayden changed the lives of millions of people because he believed something long before many others did — that individuals with intellectual and developmental disabilities deserved the same opportunities to participate, compete, belong and discover their full potential through sport."

Chris Lewis, a former Ontario Provincial Police commissioner and retiree, told of how Hayden's advocacy affected thousands of intellectually disabled people around the world. He recounted how his brother, who was autistic would not speak to strangers before the exercise programs. According to Lewis he now has interpersonal skills

Amy Van Impe said Sunday she was feeling sad about Hayden's death but grateful that she got to let him know that he was her superhero the last time she saw him at a Special Olympics event a few years ago.

44-year-old Special Olympics athlete Amy Van Impe said "I got to tell him how important he was." She described herself as having an intellectual disability and being autistic. She added that Hayden gave her the confidence to help and understand other people's differences.
