= Mohamad Fakih =

Lebanese-Canadian entrepreneur and philanthropist

Mohamad Fakih is a Lebanese-Canadian businessperson, and philanthropist. Founder of the Middle Eastern restaurant chain, Paramount Fine Foods. Fakih conducts charitable work and community service through the Fakih Foundation. In 2022, he was awarded the Order of Canada.

== Background ==
Mohamad Fakih was born to Abdallah and Nabiha in Beirut, Lebanon. In 1997, Fakih opened a jewelry store in Lebanon, working as a gemologist. He emigrated to Canada in 1999.

Fakih purchased a nearly bankrupt shawarma restaurant in Mississauga in 2006. That purchase turned into a successful restaurant franchise over the following decade. During the pandemic, the business struggled like many food service businesses.

In 2022, Fakih started a court battle for unpaid monies and to retain control of the company. AHM Investments Corp had filed an ultimately unsuccessful motion at the Ontario Superior Court to have Fakih removed as Director.

On April 1, 2025, the Toronto Star reported that the partners had legally resolved their dispute, and were recommitted to the partnership. Through an acquisition, Fakih again has supermajority operating control of the company, with AHM Investments now silent minority partners. In 2022, he was awarded the Order of Canada.

== Career ==
=== Paramount Fine Foods ===
Fakih founded Paramount in 2006 with the purchase of a small shawarma shop.

The company operates family style restaurants with entertainment for kids, while serving family-style Middle Eastern dishes. The company operates on a franchise model and is headquartered in Mississauga, Canada. Paramount sold 75% of its shares to a Kuwaiti based investment firm AHM Investments in 2015, and Fakih owns 25% equity in the business. As of 2018 there were multiple Paramount locations across North America. Fakih led an expansion of Paramount Fine Foods in the United States in 2016 facing several store closures by 2017. Paramount also operates fine middle eastern dining restaurants and halal butcher shops.

In 2018, the company purchased the naming rights to Hershey Centre, a sports arena in Mississauga, renaming it the Paramount Fine Foods Centre.

On May 30, 2021, Fakih's Paramount restaurant located in Mississauga suffered severe structural damage following a 3-alarm fire. Fakih remained firm in saying that he would rebuild what had been lost.

In 2022, a legal battle was started between Fakih and majority owners of Paramount Fine Foods, AHM Investments, at the Ontario Superior Court.By April 2025, the shareholder dispute had been resolved, and the parties indicated they were recommitted to the partnership. Through an acquisition, Fakih again has supermajority operating control of the company, with AHM Investments now silent minority partners.

== Awards and honours ==
In November 2019, Fakih was given the Key to the City of Mississauga by Mayor Bonnie Crombie.

In the fall of 2018 Fakih was awarded an honorary doctorate from Ryerson University for his contributions to Canadian society.

In 2018, the former Hershey Centre in Mississauga, a 5400 capacity sports arena, was renamed the Paramount Centre after the company purchased the naming rights.

In 2017, Fakih was one of the recipients of the Top 25 Canadian Immigrant Awards, presented by Canadian Immigrant magazine.

In 2021 Fakih was named Canadian CEO of the Year by multiple organizations, including the Ontario Chamber of Commerce, for launching Canada's first fully automated 'safe' restaurant and donating thousands of meals to various communities during the COVID-19 pandemic. Fakih was also recognized by The Globe and Mail’s Report on Business as the Corporate Citizen of the Year in 2021 and named one of Canada’s Most Admired CEOs.

Mohamad Fakih was appointed to the Order of Canada in December 2022.

== Philanthropy ==
After the 2017 Quebec City mosque shooting, Fakih paid for funeral expenses for the victims and repairs to the mosque.

During a stretch of -30 degree weather in December 2017, when Toronto’s housing shelters were at capacity, Fakih helped pay for dozens of hotel rooms for the homeless and years later, continues to financially support ongoing efforts to get families off the streets.

== Defamation suits ==
In 2017, Kevin Johnston, who was to run for mayor of Missassauga the following year, directed a series of racist attacks at Mohamad Fakih in the form of public harassment, videos and posts on his website freedom Report, and other interviews attacking his religion and his character. One incident occurred in front of Fakih's children. In 2019, an Ontario court awarded Fakih CAD $2.5 million in damages, one of the largest defamation judgments in Canadian history.

In June 2026, Fakih sued the City of Mississauga for defamation, while the City of Mississauga in turn sued Fakih for breach of contract.
