= Frances Henry =

Canadian scholar

Frances Henry is a Canadian scholar and Professor Emerita at York University. She is a member of the Royal Society of Canada and the Caribbean Studies Association (CSA).

She specializes in Caribbean Studies and is considered one of Canada's leading experts in the study of racism and anti-racism. She is the first scholar to conduct research on racism in Canada publishing a study of racial discrimination in employment in 1975. She has a long list of books, reports and articles on many aspects of racism in Canadian society.

== Research ==
Her Caribbean studies include: The Caribbean Diaspora in Toronto: Learning to Live with Racism (1994) and Reclaiming African Religion in Trinidad: The Sociopolitcal Legitimation of the Orisha and Spiritual Baptists Faiths (2003).

In 2009, she co-authored the fourth edition of The Colour of Democracy: Racism in Canadian Society that is widely used in universities as a text.

Henry’s most recent work relates to racism at Canadian universities. Her books include: Racism in the Canadian University (with C. Tator) "The Equity Myth: Racialization and Indigeneity at Canadian Universities (developed and edited) He Had the Power: Pa Neezer, the Orisha King of Trinidad, about ‘Pa Neezer’ (Ebenezer Elliott).

In recognition of her research on racism in Canada, she was invested into the Order of Canada in 2022.

== Personal life ==
Born in Germany in 1931, Henry moved with her family to the United States at age eight to escape Nazi persecution. Her grandfather was Jewish.

Henry is a life long Wagnerian serves as Chair of the Toronto Wagner Society.
