= Beverley A. Orser =

Canadian anesthesiologist

- Citizenship: Canada
- Occupation: Professor

Academic background
- Education: Medical degree 1981; PhD medical science, 1995,
- Alma mater: Queen's University at Kingston; University of Toronto
- Website: orserlab.com

Beverley Anne Orser OC OOnt is a Canadian anesthesiologist. As a professor at the University of Toronto, Orser was elected a member of the National Academy of Medicine for "her discovery of the unique pharmacological properties of extrasynaptic GABA-A receptors and their mechanistic role in anesthetic- and inflammation-induced impairment of memory, and for her leadership in academic anesthesiology.

== Early life and education ==
Born and raised in Canada, Orser lived in multiple cities in Ontario and Quebec. Orser received her medical degree from Queen's University at Kingston in 1981 and subsequently earned a Fellowship from the Royal College of Physicians and Surgeons of Canada. Upon completing her fellowship, she earned a PhD in medical science from the University of Toronto (U of T) and completed her postgraduate clinical training at the Royal Columbian Hospital in British Columbia, McMaster University in Hamilton, Oxford University, and U of T.

== Career ==
Upon completing her PhD, Orser joined the faculty at U of T where she focused her research on the molecular mechanisms of anesthetic agents. In the 1990s, her research cultivated in the observation that tonic GABAA currents in hippocampal neurons have distinct functional and pharmacologic properties. In 2003, Orser became the first Canada Research Chair in Anesthesia where she conducted research on her project Anesthetic Drugs: From Molecular Mechanisms to Patient Safety. During her tenure at U of T, she co-established the Perioperative Brain Health Centre at the Sunnybrook Health Sciences Centre to determine what causes brain problems following surgery. As a result, in 2017, Orser gained a United States patent for a class of drugs that helps patients with memory loss due to anesthesia and funding basic research.

In 2018, Orser was elected a member of the National Academy of Medicine for "her discovery of the unique pharmacological properties of extrasynaptic GABA-A receptors and their mechanistic role in anesthetic- and inflammation-induced impairment of memory, and for her leadership in academic anesthesiology." She was also recognized by the American Society of Anesthesiologists with their 2018 Excellence in Research Award in recognition of her "outstanding research accomplishments on the molecular mechanisms of anesthetic agents."

During the COVID-19 pandemic, Orser published Recommendations for Endotracheal Intubation of COVID-19 Patients and Locating and repurposing anesthetic machines as intensive care unit ventilators during the COVID-19 pandemic. She later received the 2020 Canadian College of Neuropsychopharmacology Medal for having a "meritorious career in, and outstanding contribution to, neuropsychopharmacology in Canada as evidenced by their activities in education, administration and/or patient care." Orser was made a Member of the Order of Ontario for the class of 2022.

== Personal life ==
Orser and her husband Geordie have three children together, Kevin, Becky, and Sarah.

In 2026, she was named as an Officer of the Order of Canada. She lives in Toronto.
