= Lynn Posluns =

Canadian women's health entrepreneur

Lynn Posluns is the founder and president of Women’s Brain Health Initiative in Canada. In 2021, Posluns was appointed as a Member of the Order of Canada for "her contributions to research on women’s cognitive health and aging through the founding of Women’s Brain Health Initiative."

== Career ==
=== Women’s Brain Health Initiative ===
Posluns founded the Women’s Brain Health Initiative in 2012. The Women’s Brain Health Initiative has led various efforts to champion the need to explore sex and gender differences in women’s brain-aging research, including creating the first Research Chair in Women’s Brain Health and Aging (which was awarded to Dr. Gillian Einstein at the University of Toronto), and in 2019, was one of the organizations involved in advocating for the Government of Canada to declare December 2 as Women's Brain Health Day.

In January 2022, the Women’s Brain Health Initiative was awarded $716,000 from the Public Health Agency of Canada's Dementia Strategic Fund for a two-year brain health awareness campaign. In March 2022, Women’s Brain Health Initiative and Brain Canada announced the granting of $105,000 each to six research teams through the Brain Canada-WBHI Expansion Grants: Considering Sex and Gender Program. On April 1, 2022, Posluns' organization, Women’s Brain Health Initiative, received $150,000 from the provincial Government of Ontario, as a part of the government’s Priorities and Partnerships Funding COVID-19 Equity Supports, to deliver Brainable, a free bilingual brain health education program for students in Grades 5 to 8.

Posluns has spoken about women’s cognitive health and aging for a number of media outlets, including Global News and CityNews. In 2019, Posluns received an honorary Doctor of Law degree from York University.
