= University of Alberta Faculty of Engineering =

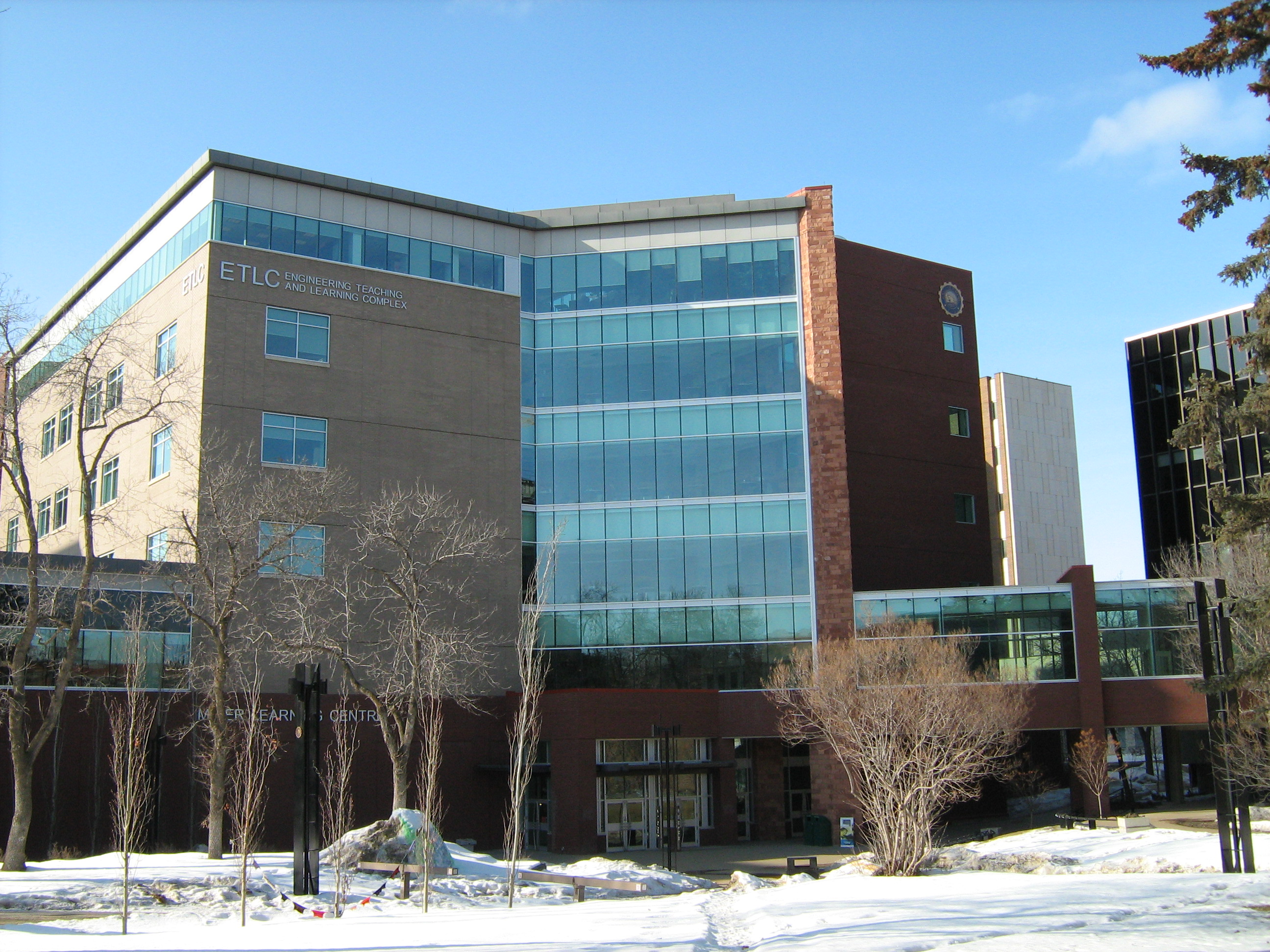
- The Engineering Teaching and Learning Complex (ETLC)
- Type: Faculty
- Established: 1908
- Affiliations: University of Alberta
- Dean: Simaan AbouRizk
- Undergraduates: 4,441
- Postgraduates: 1,519
- Location: Edmonton, Alberta, Canada
- Website: www.engineering.ualberta.ca

The University of Alberta Faculty of Engineering is one of the largest engineering schools in Canada in terms of size, international impact, and reputation. The faculty is home to 1 Canada Excellence Research Chair, 16 Canada Research Chairs, 13 Natural Sciences and Engineering Research Council chairs, and 5 Foundation Supported Chairs.

== History ==
Engineering classes have been taught at the University of Alberta since it opened in 1908.

== Programs ==
=== Undergraduate ===
The undergraduate bachelor's degree program for engineering is based on a 4-5 year program. The traditional program involves taking two terms (fall and winter) for four years to complete a degree. The co-op program involves intermittent work placement terms, within a 5-year period. Co-op programs are usually in higher demand by students than the 4 year "Traditional" programs, and thus the entrance GPA tends to be higher.

New students to engineering must first take two terms of general engineering courses before specializing into various departments. These courses include introductory chemistry, waves and light, statics, dynamics, calculus, linear algebra, computer programming and English. This is structured to give students a feel of their areas of interest and strength, before fully entering into a specialized program. A sixth course in each term (General Engineering 100 and 160) must also be taken as an introduction to both the engineering profession, and as a means for each department to recruit students.

=== Departments ===
The departments in engineering at the University of Alberta are as follows:

- Chemical and Materials Engineering (including Computer Process Control and Oil Sands Options)- The Chemical Engineering program is the top program in Canada by a wide margin and is in the top 5% in North America. This ranking is against 177 programs in both the U.S. and Canada. This ranking is based on total refereed publications over a 5-year period as listed in the Science Citation Index of ISI.^{[Source?]}
- Civil and Environmental Engineering (including School of Mining and Petroleum Engineering), The Civil and Environmental Engineering Department offers undergraduate programs in Civil (with an environmental option for final year specialization), Mining, and Petroleum Engineering. The undergraduate program for Mining Engineering is ranked 3rd in Canada, and 22nd Globally, and Petroleum ranked 2nd in Canada, and 9th Globally, while the Environmental option ranked 1st in Canada and 18th Globally, in 2025
- Electrical and Computer Engineering (including nano-electrical and Software options and Engineering Physics)
- Mechanical Engineering
- Biomedical Engineering, the department hosts graduate and PhD students.
- Mechatronics and Robotics Engineering is a new program jointly administrated by the Mechanical and Electrical departments.

=== Graduate ===
All five Faculty of Engineering departments offer MSc, MEng, and PhD programs.

== Key Research Facilities ==
- The nanoFAB - An open access micro and nano fabrication research facility.
- The National Institute for Nanotechnology (NINT) – A joint venture with the National Research Council Canada (NRC) that hosts facilities and research programs involving more than 300 researchers.
- The Alberta Centre for Surface Engineering and Science (ACSES) – A $20M multi-disciplinary integrated surface characterization and modification facility.
- The Oil Sands Tailings Research Facility – A facility designed to support substantial fundamental tailings research at a pilot scale (600 and 2000 kg solids per hour) and accommodate multiple, concurrent interdisciplinary research projects.
- The Peter S. Allen Magnetic Resonance Research Centre - A facility located inside the University Hospital that houses 1.5 T, 3 T and 4.7 T full-body MRI systems.

== Campus ==
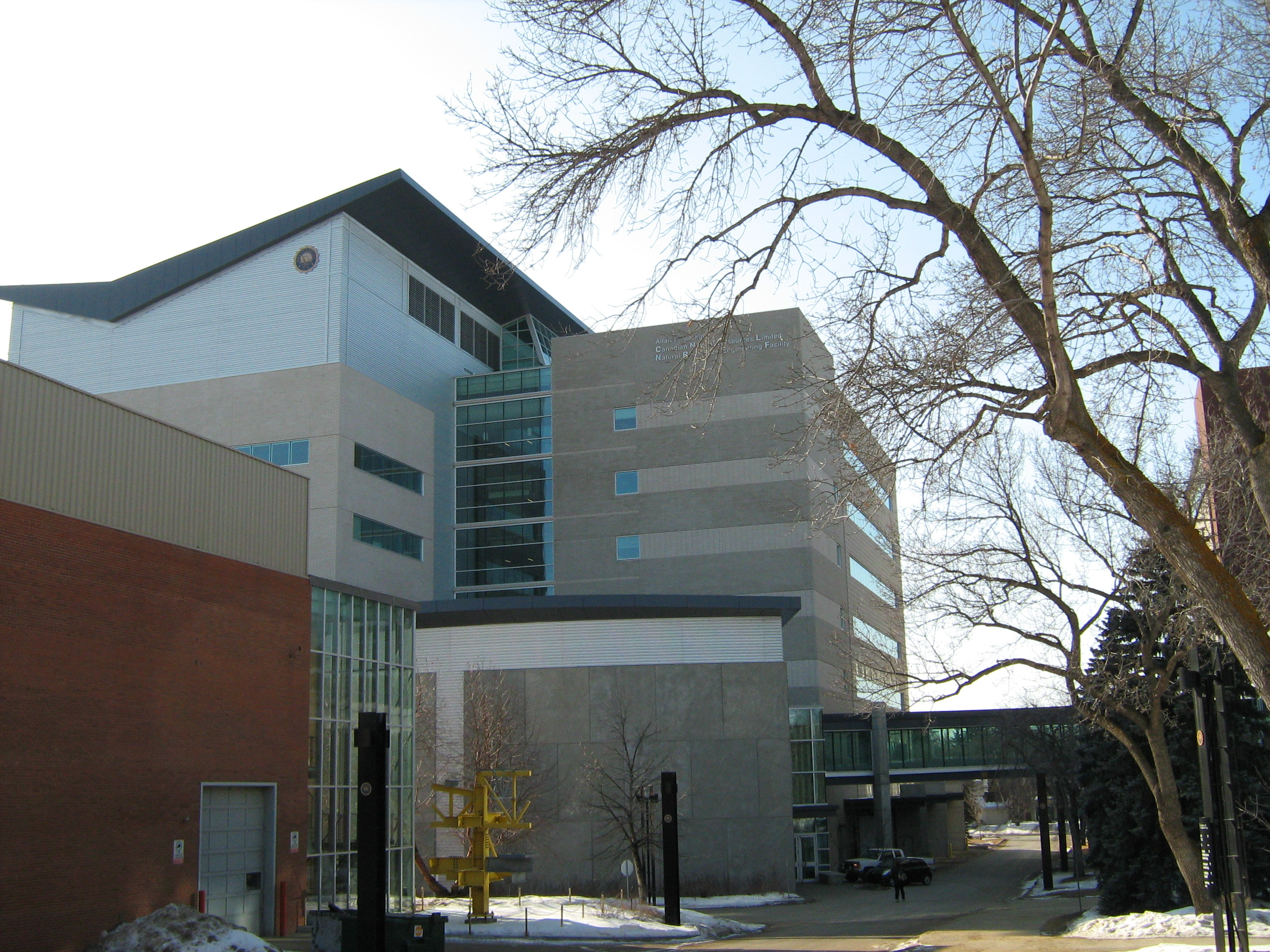
The Natural Resource Engineering Facility

Faculty of Engineering facilities are located mainly in the north-west corner of the University of Alberta campus and have experienced much growth since 2001. The joint Engineering Teaching and Learning Complex (ETLC) and Electrical and Computer Engineering Research Facility (ECERF) was completed in February 2002. ETLC contains the main Faculty of Engineering offices, several lecture halls, and many electrical and computer engineering laboratories. ECERF houses department and faculty offices as well as for lab space for graduate and postdoctoral work. The Allan P. Markin/Canadian Natural Resources Limited Natural Resources Engineering Facility (NREF) was added on October 1, 2004, and houses most civil and environmental engineering programs. Most recently, the National Institute for Nanotechnology was opened in June 2006. As a joint venture between the federal and provincial governments of Canada and Alberta and the University of Alberta, the institute houses some of the world's best nanotechnology facilities. It is Canada's quietest research space, filtering out all electromagnetic, acoustical and vibrational noise. Other facilities include the Mechanical Engineering and Chemical/Materials Engineering buildings, both of which are connected to ETLC by pedway.

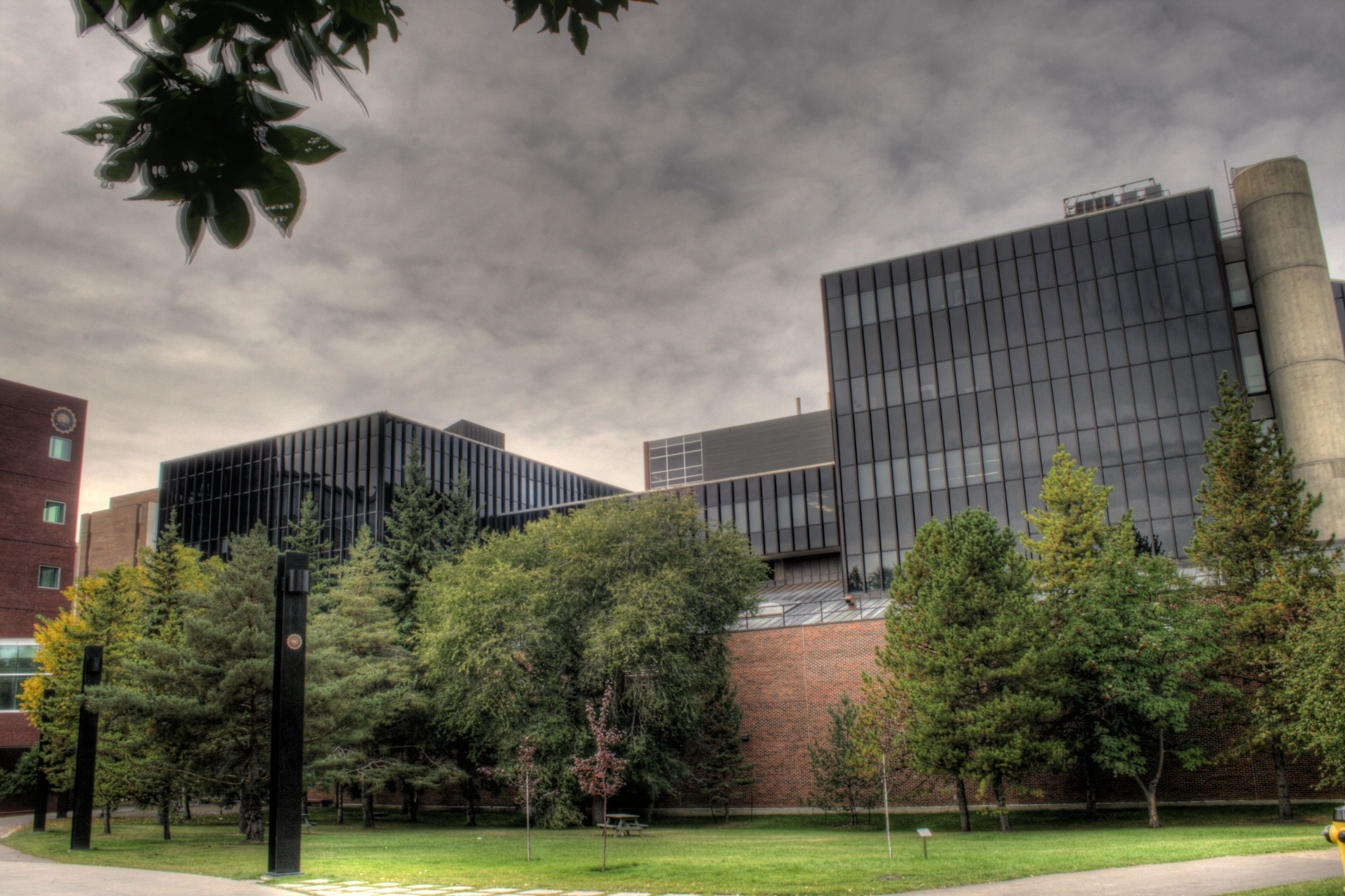
The Mechanical Engineering Building

A new structure, the Donadeo Innovation Centre for Engineering (D-ICE) was erected between the Chemical and Materials Engineering Building and the Windsor Car Park. The new building will provide approximately 28,400 square metres of space to support expanded educational and research activities in the Faculty of Engineering. The building houses faculty members, staff, and students from every engineering discipline.
