= Judy Cameron =

Canadian commercial airline pilot (born 1954)

Judy Cameron CM (born 1954), is a Canadian retired commercial airline pilot. She was the first Canadian woman pilot to fly for Air Canada, the second woman to fly for a Canadian commercial airline, the first Canadian female captain of a Boeing 767 and the first Canadian female captain of a Boeing 777.

During a summer job interviewing pilots for Transport Canada, she became interested in an aviation career. She ended her Arts studies at the University of British Columbia and drove eight hours on a motorbike across British Columbia to enroll in flight school at Selkirk College in Castlegar. She was the only woman in a class of 30 men and had little background in math or physics. When she graduated in 1975, she was Selkirk's first female graduate. Cameron went on to work for regional airlines in Alberta, and also spent a year co-piloting a DC-3 in Inuvik, NT, where she loaded planes on her own for supply runs to oil fields in Tuktoyaktuk.

In 1978, at the age of 24, she was hired by Air Canada, becoming the airline's first female pilot. She was the first woman hired as a pilot for a major Canadian airline and the second woman hired to fly for a commercial airline, following Rosella Bjornson. Air Canada held a press conference and the news hit front pages—US pilot Emily Warner had only been hired in 1973. Passengers sometimes treated her poorly, hurled abusive and demeaning comments and even passed her garbage.

Cameron was promoted to captain in 1997 and in 2010 became the first female captain in Canada of a Boeing 777. In 2015, she was awarded the Elsie MacGill Northern Lights Award. She retired on May 24, 2015, after a 37-year career with Air Canada, in which she had achieved 23,000 flying hours.
