= Charles W. Elliott =

Canadian artist (1943 – 2023)

- Born: Charles Elliott Termosen; 1943; Saanich, British Columbia, Canada
- Died: January 29, 2023 (aged 79–80); Saanich, British Columbia, Canada
- Known for: wood carver and graphic artist

Charles W. Elliott OBC RCA or Charles Elliott Termosen (1943 – 2023) was a wood carver and graphic artist of the Tsartlip First Nation.

== Career ==
Elliott was born and made his home in Saanich, British Columbia, on Vancouver Island. He carved since he was a child.

Elliott's totem poles have been placed at several locations throughout Greater Victoria, including three at the Victoria International Airport, one at Butchart Gardens, and one at the University of Victoria (near the Elliott building, which, however, is named after scientist Percy Harris Elliott). His carvings also include interior decorations at the Victoria International Airport, a podium used for the 2013 Congress of the Humanities and Social Sciences at the University of Victoria, the altar at St. Andrew's Cathedral (Victoria, British Columbia), the Queen's Baton used in the 1994 Commonwealth Games in Victoria, and a talking stick presented to Nelson Mandela. Thirty of his pieces belong to the permanent art collection of the University of Victoria.

In 2005 he was awarded the Order of British Columbia. In 2013 he was inducted into the Royal Canadian Academy of Arts.

His artwork remains the logo of the Shaw Centre for the Salish Sea and can be seen at the entrance to this aquarium dedicated to the Salish Sea.
