= Verena Tunnicliffe =

Canadian marine biologist

Verena Tunnicliffe OC
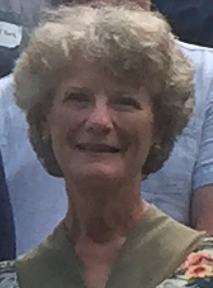
- Verena Tunnicliffe in 2018
- Born: Verena Tunnicliffe; Ontario, Canada
- Education: McMaster University (B.S.); Yale University (M.S.); Yale University (Ph.D.)
- Known for: Hydrothermal Vents; Deep Sea Exploration; Hypoxic Habitats
- Awards: Canada Research Chair in Deep Ocean Research (2002-present); Murray Newman Award for Excellence in Aquatic Science and Conservation (2014), David H. Turpin Gold Medal (2016)
- Scientific career
- Fields: Marine Science and Ocean Studies
- Workplaces: University of Victoria
- Thesis: (1980)

Verena Julia Tunnicliffe OC is a Canadian Marine Biologist and Professor of the University of Victoria. Since 2002, she has held the position of Canada Research Chair in Deep Ocean Research. Her research on hydrothermal systems helped establish Canada's first Endeavor Hot Vents Marine Protected Area. Her research has also led to the discovery of over 80 new species of marine life.

== Early life ==
Tunnicliffe grew up in Deep River, Ontario. Her fascination with the ocean started at a young age, though she never glimpsed the sea until she was nineteen. It was her mother who introduced her, at age seven, to the ocean. A small wooden box encrusted with seashells, brought back to her from Florida was all it took to begin a lifelong obsession with the sea. Tunnicliffe decided then to become a marine biologist and dedicate her time to learning the name and origin of all the creatures that created those shells. She realised part of that dream during a PhD programme to study coral reefs in Jamaica.

The early 80s proved fruitful for the young researcher. During a post-doctoral fellowship at the Institute of Ocean Sciences, Tunnicliffe instead became the first woman on the West Coast to lead deep-sea research expeditions from Vancouver Island. She only meant to stay in British Columbia for two years, but by 1983 Tunnicliffe helped to discover hydrothermal vent systems off the coast, explored previously unknown sections of the deep sea, and was part of the discovery of over 80 new marine species.

== Career ==
Tunnicliffe has been a professor at the University of Victoria in the Departments of Biology and School of Earth and Ocean Sciences since 1982. She is a marine biologist who held a Canada Research Chair in Deep Ocean Research until retirement in 2020. As a research chair, her work mainly focuses on the use of submersibles and deep sea observatories to research and discover deep sea ecosystems, including hydrothermal vents in the Pacific Ocean. Her lab has been working for over 30 years on animals that live near hydrothermal vents in the Pacific Ocean, mainly focusing work in the Juan de Fuca Plate. Her research on hydrothermal systems helped establish Canada's first Marine Protected Area: the Endeavour Hot Vents MPA. In her career thus far, she has discovered over 80 new species of life including ten that are named after her.

Tunnicliffe worked with the Canadian Scientific Submersible Facility to raise funds to equip, run and operate ROPOS, a remotely operated submersible that can go 5000 m depth and currently works throughout the world's oceans. She was the principal lead in the developing and directing operations (for ten years) of the cabled subsea observing network, VENUS, the world's first subsea research system delivering on-line data in 2006. She was also a leader of the Deep-Ocean Stewardship Initiative Minerals Working Group, which provides interdisciplinary guidance regarding sustainable deep-sea mining. Tunnicliffe is a collaborator with the Canadian Healthy Ocean Strategic Network of researchers who work in collaboration with Fisheries and Oceans Canada. Her main work in the network is discovering ways to conserve the Canadian marine ecosystems in an ocean environment that is changing rapidly.

== Personal life ==
Much of Tunnicliffe's personal life revolves around her career. Her father had a strong influence on her interest in science. He was a nuclear physicist at Chalk River Nuclear Laboratories in Ontario, Canada. He treated Verena and her older brother as equals, making sure they knew skills such as constructing a telescope and tinkering with electronics. Although her father was hesitant to employ women, due to the views of society at the time, he encouraged her to pursue her interests.

Tunncliffe is married to Dr. John Garrett, a marine policy consultant and has a daughter plus three step-children. Tunnicliffe told her daughter to "follow her passion" and to "address your own happiness and health". Her daughter has an MSc degree in botany.

== Publications ==
Samples include:

- Tunnicliffe, Verena; McArthur, Andrew G.; McHugh, Damhnait (1998-01-01). Blaxter, J. H. S.; Southward, A. J.; Tyler, P. A. (eds.). Advances in Marine Biology: A biogeographical perspective of the deep-sea hydrothermal vent fauna. Vol. 34. Academic Press. pp. 353–442. doi:10.1016/S0065-2881(08)60213-8. ISBN 978-0-12-026134-5.
- Tunnicliffe, Verena; Tyler, Jennifer; Dower, John F. (2013-08-01). "Population ecology of the tonguefish Symphurus thermophilus (Pisces; Pleuronectiformes; Cynoglossidae) at sulphur-rich hydrothermal vents on volcanoes of the northern Mariana Arc". Deep Sea Research Part II: Topical Studies in Oceanography. Deep-Sea Biodiversity and Life History Processes. 92 (Supplement C): 172–182. Bibcode:2013DSRII..92..172T. doi:10.1016/j.dsr2.2013.01.026.
- Tunnicliffe, Verena (1981). "Breakage and propagation of the stony coral Acropora cervicornis" (PDF). Proc. Natl. Acad. Sci. USA. 78 (4): 2427–2431. Bibcode:1981PNAS...78.2427T. doi:10.1073/pnas.78.4.2427. PMC 319359. PMID 16593007.
- Tunnicliffe, Verena; Germain, Candice St; Hilário, Ana (2014-10-22). "Phenotypic Variation and Fitness in a Metapopulation of Tubeworms (Ridgeia piscesae Jones) at Hydrothermal Vents". PLOS ONE. 9 (10) e110578. Bibcode:2014PLoSO...9k0578T. doi:10.1371/journal.pone.0110578. ISSN 1932-6203. PMC 4206443. PMID 25337895.
- Matabos, Marjolaine; Tunnicliffe, Verena; Juniper, S. Kim; Dean, Courtney (2012-09-19). "A Year in Hypoxia: Epibenthic Community Responses to Severe Oxygen Deficit at a Subsea Observatory in a Coastal Inlet". PLOS ONE. 7 (9) e45626. Bibcode:2012PLoSO...745626M. doi:10.1371/journal.pone.0045626. ISSN 1932-6203. PMC 3446942. PMID 23029145.
- Chu, Jackson W. F.; Tunnicliffe, Verena (2015-08-01). "Oxygen limitations on marine animal distributions and the collapse of epibenthic community structure during shoaling hypoxia". Global Change Biology. 21 (8): 2989–3004. Bibcode:2015GCBio..21.2989C. doi:10.1111/gcb.12898. ISSN 1365-2486. PMID 25689932. S2CID 25787225.
- Leys, Sally P.; Yahel, Gitai; Reidenbach, Matthew A.; Tunnicliffe, Verena; Shavit, Uri; Reiswig, Henry M. (2011-12-13). "The Sponge Pump: The Role of Current Induced Flow in the Design of the Sponge Body Plan". PLOS ONE. 6 (12) e27787. Bibcode:2011PLoSO...627787L. doi:10.1371/journal.pone.0027787. ISSN 1932-6203. PMC 3236749. PMID 22180779.
- Smith, Craig R., Tunnicliffe, Verena., Colaço, A., Drazen, J. C., Gollner, S., Levin, L. A., ... & Amon, D. J. (2020-07-31). "Deep-sea misconceptions cause underestimation of seabed-mining impacts." Trends in Ecology & Evolution. 35 (10): 853-857. doi:10.1016/j.tree.2020.07.002

== Honors and awards ==
- Fellow of the Royal Society of Canada (1992)
- Steacie Prize (1993)
- Canada Research Chair in Deep Ocean Research (2002)
- Murray Newman Award for Excellence in Aquatic Science and Conservation. - Received for her achievement in aquatic research and conservation (2014)
- David H. Turpin Gold Medal for Career Achievement in Research (2016)
- Harald Sverdrup Lecture, American Geophysical Union (2021)
- Order of Canada (2021)
