= Helene Polatajko =

Canadian occupational therapy researcher

- Education: Bachelor of Occupational Therapy; Master's and a PhD
- Alma mater: McGill University; Ontario Institute for Studies in Education (OISE)
- Occupation: Occupational therapy researcher

Helene J. Polatajko is an occupational therapy scholar, and Professor Emerita in the department of occupational science and occupational therapy at the University of Toronto's Temerty Faculty of Medicine.

== Education ==
Polatajko completed a Bachelor of Occupational Therapy at McGill University, and a master's and a PhD at the University of Toronto's Ontario Institute for Studies in Education (OISE).

== Career ==
Polatajko's research explored the role of cognition in motor-based performance, and led to the development of a daily treatment to enable children with Developmental Coordination Disorder reach occupational therapy goals (titled the Cognitive Orientation to daily Occupational Performance approach). In 2021, Polatajko was appointed as an Officer of the Order of Canada for "significantly advancing the understanding of developmental coordination disorder in children."

Polatajko is a fellow of the Canadian Academy of Health Sciences.
