= NEOS Library Consortium =

Canadian library consortium

The NEOS Library Consortium consists of 17 Canadian university, college, government, and hospital libraries with 49 sites between them. Patrons (i.e. students, faculty, staff) belonging to any NEOS library have seamless access to most of the substantial holdings shared by NEOS members. As of March 31, 2009, NEOS holdings were 10,867,551 volumes (books, periodicals, microform). The substantial additional holdings of electronic books, databases, and journals are not included because licensing arrangements often limit these to primary users of each library.

Most NEOS libraries and branches are located in Edmonton or the central and northern areas of Alberta: Camrose, Devon, Fairview, Grande Prairie, Lacombe, Lloydminster, Olds, Red Deer, St. Albert, Sherwood Park, Vegreville. There is one member site in Calgary.

NEOS member libraries collaborate in many ways:

- development and maintenance of a shared on-line integrated library system
- shared electronic catalogue of consortium holdings
- shared patron database
- reciprocal borrowing and reference services
- interlibrary loan service supported by a document delivery distribution system
- cooperative collection development
- continuing education and staff development activities.

== History and significance ==
In 1994, the University of Alberta Libraries spearheaded an "alliance of academic and government libraries" around Edmonton, Alberta, Canada to "create a union catalogue of their regional holdings." The overall goal, was to "provide cost-efficient access" to the various libraries' respective clients through the sharing of resources. The descriptive acronym NEOS certainly reflected the original task of "Networking Edmonton’s On-line Services” but quickly became obsolete as libraries outside Edmonton joined the consortium; nevertheless, "NEOS" has stuck.

In a 2009 interview on the history of the University of Alberta Libraries, Ernie Ingles (Vice-Provost & Chief Librarian) commented on the significance of the NEOS consortium. For example,

- “People building consortial networks came from places like Minnesota and Ohio to see how we did NEOS, and they’re still coming.”
- NEOS “is considered so matter-of-fact that no one really thinks about what it is or where it came from. Even now people in the government are often genuinely surprised when they find that their entire government library services are being underpinned by the University of Alberta Library because all of those libraries are part of NEOS, and that most of the colleges north of Olds [Alberta] are also part of NEOS.”
- “I honestly don’t think that The Alberta Library or the Lois Hole Digital Library would have come into existence without the work we did in creating NEOS.”

== Member libraries ==
Alberta Geological Survey Library
Alberta Government Library

- The Alberta Government Library primarily serves staff in most Government of Alberta ministries (MLAs are served by the Alberta Legislative Library which is not part of the NEOS consortium). In 2000, the Alberta Government Library was formed with ten site libraries consolidated from the 22 libraries previously administered by individual ministries. Around 2003, the ten sites became eight with further consolidation in 2009 to seven. By late 2010, plans are to have only 4 sites.
- Sites (2010): 107 Street Site, Capital Boulevard Site, Commerce Place Site, Great West Life Site, Labour Building Site, Neil Crawford Centre Site, Telus Plaza North Tower Site

Alberta Health Services - Library Services

- sites(2010): Alberta Hospital Edmonton, Cross Cancer Institute, Glenrose Rehabilitation Hospital, Royal Alexandra Hospital, Sturgeon Community Hospital

Alberta Innovates - Technology Futures Libraries

- Sites(2010): C-FER, Calgary, Devon, Mill Woods, Vegreville

Canadian University College Library
Concordia University College of Alberta Library

- Sites(2010): Concordia Lutheran Seminary, Concordia University College

Covenant Health Library Services

- Sites(2010): Grey Nuns Community Hospital Health Sciences, Misericordia Community Hospital Weinlos

Grande Prairie Regional College

- Sites(2010): Fairview, Grande Prairie

MacEwan University Library

- Sites(2010): Alberta College, Centre for the Arts and Communications, City Centre Campus, and South Campus. Note: MacEwan is a member of NEOS but does not currently share the NEOS catalogue. It is expected that the MacEwan Library catalogue will be fully integrated with the NEOS catalogue in August 2011.

Keyano College

- Keyano joined the NEOS consortium in 2010 its collections integrated into the NEOS catalogue in November 2010

King's University College Library
Lakeland College Library

- Sites(2010): Lloydminster, Vermilion

Newman Theological College Library
NorQuest College Library [NorQuest College]

- Sites (2014): Edmonton Main, Edmonton Westmount

Olds College Library
Red Deer College Library
Taylor College and Seminary
University of Alberta Library

- One of the largest research library systems in Canada (see University of Alberta libraries.
- Sites(2010): Augustana Campus Library in Camrose AB, Bibliothèque Saint-Jean, Cameron Science and Technology Library (incl. Dr. Josephine M. Mitchell Math Library), H.T. Coutts Education and Physical Education Library, J.A. Weir Memorial Law Library, J.W. Scott Health Sciences Library, Rutherford Humanities and Social Sciences Library (incl. Bruce Peel Special Collections, Data Library, Music Library), Winspear Business Reference Library, and the BARD book and record depository.
