= Gerry Kuipers =

Dutch-Canadian businessman and auto restorer

- Born: Gerhardus Kuipers II; July 31, 1935; Den Helder, The Netherlands
- Died: May 13, 2013 (aged 77); Edmonton, Canada
- Other names: Gerald Kuipers; Gerhard Kuipers
- Occupation(s): Entrepreneur, auto restorer
- Children: 4, including Ronald A. Kuipers
- Awards: Powerama Prize for Antique Car Restoration (2005)

Gerry Kuipers (born Gerhardus Kuipers; 31 July 1935 – 13 May 2013) was a Dutch-Canadian businessman and auto restorer active in the late twentieth century. Kuipers was also the plaintiff in the 1976 Alberta Supreme Court lawsuit Kuipers v Gordon Riley Transport. Following Kuipers' passing in 2013, many of his personal papers were archived in the Gerry Segger Heritage Collection at The King's University in Edmonton, Canada.

== Early life ==
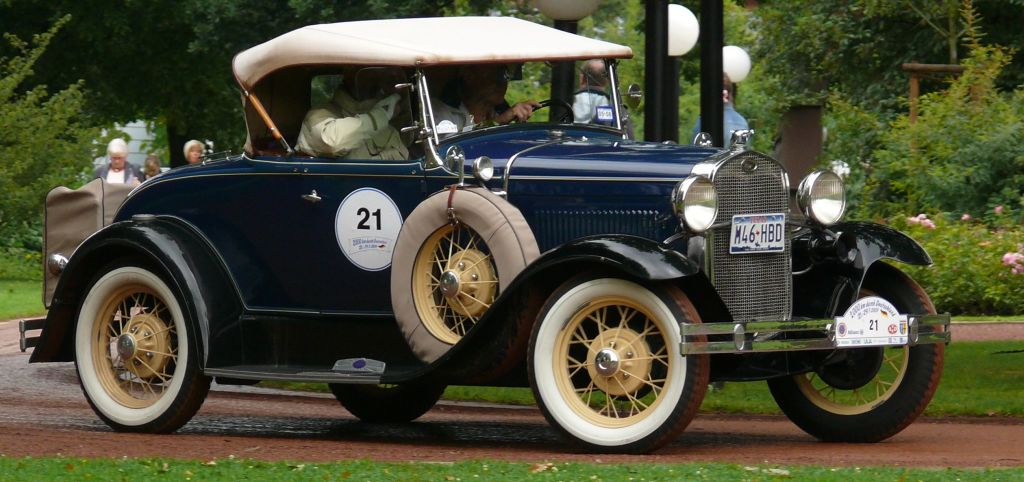
Kuipers' 1930 Model A Roadster won first prize at the 2005 Powerama Motoring Expo

Gerry Kuipers was born in the Netherlands in 1935 and immigrated to Canada in 1954 at the age of nineteen. In 1997, Kuipers' memories of the Netherlands in World War II were published by the Zwartsluis Historical Society.

== Career ==
=== Entrepreneurship ===
Gerry Kuipers founded several Canadian industrial companies including Rainbow Eavestroughing in 1964, Rainbow Aluminum Products in 1977, Rainbow Metal Products in 1982, and Hardwill Holdings in 1990. In 1986, Rainbow Metal Products built the eves for Edmonton's Youth Empowerment & Support Services (YESS), whose buildings at 9310 82 Avenue have been recognized regionally in Alberta for their Late Art Deco architectural style.

=== Automotive restoration ===
Kuipers began restoring Ford Model A automobiles in the 1970s; however, it was not until the early 2000s that Kuipers began to receive national recognition in Canada for the collection of automobiles that he had restored. Some of Kuipers' notable restorations include the 1929 Ford Model A Pickup, restored in 1979, and the 1931 Ford Phaeton Deluxe, restored in 2001. Kuipers' 1929 Ford Model A Pickup was used as the Royal Mail delivery truck in Roger Tilton's 1982 film Pilots North with Kuipers acting as the postman and driving the truck throughout the film.

Following Kuipers' restoration of a 1930 Ford Model A Roadster, the Edmonton Journal stated that Kuipers had "revived a piece of Canadian heritage" and the Victoria Times Colonist stated that the legacy of Kuipers' work "inspires patriotism" in Canada. Canwest journalist Darcy Gray wrote that the Canadian origin of Kuipers' 1930 Ford Model A Roadster was proven due to the fact that Kuipers found the body intact with original Robertson screws, which were not used in American models. Canadian automotive historian James C. Mays has written that the cost for Kuipers' 1930 Model A "peaked in the $40,000 range" in the mid-1990s.

In 2005, Kuipers won first prize at the Powerama Motoring Expo for a restored 1930 Ford Model A Roadster.

=== Kuipers v Gordon Riley Transport ===
Gerry Kuipers was the plaintiff in the 1976 Alberta Supreme Court lawsuit Kuipers v Gordon Riley Transport, which has received judicial notice and has been followed variously in the Supreme Court of Prince Edward Island, the Supreme Court of British Columbia, and the Court of Queen's Bench of Alberta. The suit pertained to a car accident in Southern Alberta on 28 January 1972 which left one of Kuipers' sons seriously injured. Historically the lawsuit has been cited in Canadian tort case law because of Samuel Sereth Lieberman's judgments regarding negligence and standard of care. Additionally, the case has been identified as part of a historical shift in Canadian tort law in the 1970s which took place when several Albertan personal injury lawsuits began to be argued based on negligence principles instead of the English tort of public nuisance. The case was settled in Kuipers' favour and the family was awarded a total of $124,077.09 in damages. (Note: This is $647,958.14 in 2024 dollars.)

== Personal life ==
Gerry Kuipers had four children, one of whom is Canadian philosopher Ronald A. Kuipers. Gerry Kuipers was a member of the Alberta Genealogical Society and Kuipers' personal genealogical research has been discussed in various publications such as Relatively Speaking and Aus der Grafschaft Bentheim in die Neue Welt.

Gerry Kuipers died on 13 May 2013.
