= List of closed stack libraries =

A closed stack library contains books and other items that are not available for viewing or browsing by the general public. Many important libraries close their stacks of books to the public, limiting retrieval to professional library staff only (policies on who may use the collections varies). Most private, larger public, and university/academic/research libraries who have open stacks also have special collections that are closed. Reasons for having closed stacks vary, and include preventing theft, vandalism, and minimizing reshelving errors.

== Examples ==
- Académie Nationale de Médecine in Paris, France
- Beinecke Rare Book & Manuscript Library at Yale University in New Haven, Connecticut. The library contains rare books and original manuscripts.
- Bibliothèque Nationale de France in Paris, France
- Boston Athenaeum
- British Library - most items in London and all items at Boston Spa in Yorkshire
- Deering Library at Northwestern University in Evanston, Illinois
- Fales Library on the third floor of the New York University Bobst Library in New York City. 200,000 volumes.
- Free Library of Philadelphia
- Frick Art Reference Library in New York City. 285,000 books. 80,000 auction catalogs.
- Leiden University Library in Leiden
- The Library of Congress in Washington D.C. over 34,000,000 volumes as of 2010.
- Research collections of The New York Public Library in New York City
- National Library of Australia in Canberra, Australia. 10 million volumes
- National Library of Finland in Helsinki, Finland
- Radcliffe Science Library at the University of Oxford, England
- Ralph Brown Draughon Library at Auburn University in Auburn, Alabama.
- The Rare Book & Manuscript Library and the Bookstacks of the Main Library at the University of Illinois at Urbana–Champaign.
- Rauner Special Collections Library at Dartmouth College in Hanover, New Hampshire
- Regenstein Library at the University of Chicago
- Seeley G. Mudd Manuscript Library at Princeton University in Princeton, New Jersey. Original manuscripts.
- The Special Collections division of the University at Buffalo Libraries in Amherst, NY, which includes the Poetry Collection, Archives, and Rare Books.
- State of Arizona Research Library, a division of the Secretary of State of Arizona in Phoenix, AZ, which includes the Arizona Collection, the Federal Documents Collection, the Arizona State Government Publications Collection, a map collection, a law collection, and the largest collection of Arizona newspapers in Arizona.
- Tamiment Library and Robert F. Wagner Archives on the tenth floor of the New York University Bobst Library in New York City. 75,000 volumes.
- Thomas Fisher Rare Book Library at the University of Toronto in Toronto, Canada
- Bruce Peel Special Collections at the University of Alberta Library
