= Special collections =

Libraries or library units

In library science, special collections (Spec. Coll. or S.C.) are libraries or library units that house materials requiring specialized security and user services. Special collections can be found in many different organisations including research libraries, universities, colleges, schools, national libraries, public libraries, museums, art galleries, archives, historic houses, cathedrals, subscription libraries, learned societies, hospitals, companies and monasteries.

Materials housed in special collections can be in any format (including rare books, manuscripts, photographs, archives, ephemera, and digital records), and are generally characterized by their artifactual or monetary value, physical format, uniqueness or rarity, and/or an institutional commitment to long-term preservation and access. They can also include association with important figures or institutions in history, culture, politics, sciences, or the arts. Some special collections are recognised as being of global importance; the UNESCO Memory of the World Register includes documentary heritage material.

Individual libraries or archival institutions determine for themselves what constitute their own special collections, resulting in a somewhat mutable definition that is often a legacy of the institution's organisational structure. For example, archives may be part of a special collections department or managed separately, and whilst rare books and manuscripts are often kept within special collections some institutions may use the term exclusively for modern material. Larger, historically distinct collections may also be managed as part of a Special Collections department: for example, the British Cartoon Archive at the University of Kent is part of the Templeman Library's Special Collections & Archives.

For research libraries, a special collections area or division can be a fundamental part of their mission. Some special collections are standalone institutions that are privately funded, such as the Newberry Library or the American Antiquarian Society while others are part of a larger institution, such as the Beinecke Library at Yale University or Special Collections at University College London. Many American university special collections grew out of the merging of rare book rooms and manuscripts departments in a university's library system.

In contrast to general (or circulating) libraries, the uniqueness of special collections means that they are not easily replaced (if at all) and therefore require a higher level of security and handling.

== Function ==
The primary function of a special collections division is to foster research by providing researchers and interested groups or individuals access to items while ensuring their longevity. Many staff members involved with special collections have either advanced degrees or specialized training related to the collections for which they are responsible.

== Storage ==
Items in a special collection are usually stored in closed stacks (not directly accessible to the institution's patrons) which contain noncirculating items, meaning that items cannot be loaned or otherwise removed from the premises. Access to materials is usually under supervision. Depending on the policies of an institution holding special collections, researchers may be asked to present identification cards, letters of reference, or other credentials to gain access.

Most special collections are stored in areas in which the temperature, humidity, illumination, and other environmental conditions are carefully monitored to ensure the integrity of materials, and adequate security is provided to protect the materials from unauthorized access, theft, and vandalism.

Offsite storage facilities have become increasingly popular among institutions holding special collections. Most libraries consider it their mandate to maintain acquisition of new collections, although the limitations of their physical plants may not be able to handle all that is acquired. Storing materials offsite allows flexibility in how libraries design and apportion their space and provides security for materials. The 2010 "Taking Our Pulse" report cites a survey in which 67% of responding institutions use offsite facilities, with another 5% in planning stages.

== Reading room characteristics ==
Special reading rooms are often provided to minimize the risk to holdings while being consulted by patrons, which are sometimes monitored by library personnel who also provide reference assistance and relay requests for materials. Rules often apply to use of materials in order to protect against inadvertent damage; Writing implements which use ink are very commonly prohibited, as well as flash photography, use of mobile phones (except for photography), and the presence of food and beverages. Protective gloves are sometimes required when consulting particularly delicate materials, photographs, and metal objects, and many libraries may require that books be read only while resting in special cradles. Research libraries are increasingly investigating offering virtual reading rooms and virtual teaching environments to support remote access to special collections - work which has been accelerated since the COVID-19 pandemic.

== See also ==
- Archive
- Manuscript
- Book collecting
- Cultural heritage
- Historic preservation
- Primary source
- Born-digital
- Bibliography
- Historical society
- List of closed stack libraries

== Bibliography ==
- ARL Task Force on Special Collections (2003), Special Collections Statement of Principles: Research Libraries and the Commitment to Special Collections (PDF), Washington, D.C.: Association of Research Libraries, archived (PDF) from the original on 2016-03-04
- Association of College & Research Libraries (2008), Guidelines: Competencies for Special Collections Professionals, Washington D.C.: American Library Association, archived from the original on 2016-01-27
- Association of Research Libraries (2009), Special Collections in ARL Libraries: A Discussion Report from the ARL Working Group on Special Collections (PDF), Washington, D.C.: Association of Research Libraries, archived (PDF) from the original on 2015-04-07
- Association of College & Research Libraries (2016), Guidelines on the Selection and Transfer of Materials from General Collections to Special Collections (4 ed.), Washington D.C.: American Library Association
- Cave, Roderick (1982), Rare Book Librarianship (2nd, revised ed.), London: Clive Bingley, ISBN 0851573282
- Dooley, Jackie M.; Luce, Katherine (2010), Taking Our Pulse: The OCLC Research Survey of Special Collections and Archives (PDF), Dublin, OH: OCLC Research, archived (PDF) from the original on 2012-11-06
- Hirshon, A., Jackson, R. H., & Hubbard, M. A. (Eds). (2016). Forging the Future of Special Collections. ALA Neal-Schuman.
- Panitch, Judith M. (2001), Special Collections in ARL Libraries: Results of the 1998 Survey Sponsored by the ARL Research Collections Committee (PDF), Washington, D.C.: Association of Research Libraries, archived (PDF) from the original on 2022-06-23
- McDade, Travis (2020), The Inside Story of the $8 Million Heist From the Carnegie Library, Smithsonian Magazine, archived from the original on 2023-09-08
