= Pinchin =

Pinchin is a surname. Notable people with the surname include:

- Harry Pinchin (born 1935), Canadian musician
- Karen Pinchin (fl. 2017), Canadian writer and journalist

== See also ==
- Pinchin Johnson & Associates, UK supplier of paints and coatings
