= Pilots North =

- Theatrical release poster
- Directed by: Roger Tilton; Jerry Clemans
- Produced by: Roger Tilton Harold Lee Tichenor Glen W. Lavold (exec)
- Starring: Bob Bainborough; Shirley Martin; Gerry Kuipers
- Narrated by: Lanny Lee Hagen
- Cinematography: Donald Gundrey; Tom Fillingham
- Music by: Tommy Banks; Harry Pinchin; Peter Bentley (sound design)
- Production companies: Roger Tilton Films, Inc. Cinitel Film Productions
- Release date: July 22, 1981
- Country: Canada
- Language: English

Pilots North is a 1981 docudrama film directed by Roger Tilton and Jerry Clemans.

== Synopsis ==
The first half of the film is set in the winter, depicting planes that must land on frozen lakes or snow-covered land. The second half of the film is set in the summer and depicts seaplanes. Similar to previous films directed by Roger Tilton, Pilots North is a docudrama featuring five short dramatic vignettes that are interspersed with narration by Lanny Lee Hagen.

The first dramatic vignette features a conversation between a doctor and a bush pilot in a Beachcraft Staggerwing. The second vignette introduces two additional bush pilots, Jim and Arnie, who are delivering mail to remote locations in the Northern Canada. Jim is to deliver goods to Fort Smith, Fort Norman, and Aklavik, while Arnie must deliver goods to Yellowknife and Coppermine, Northwest Territories. First delivered by a truck driver (played by Gerry Kuipers), the mail and medicine is subsequently delivered to Jim and Arnie who begin their journeys north. The third dramatic vignette depicts a struggling bush pilot whose seaplane won't start as his plane drifts closer and closer toward rapids and the Virginia Falls in Nahanni National Park. The fourth vignette depicts the workings of a pilot radio relay station.

The fifth and final dramatic vignette depicts an unnamed Inuit community with igloos who receive mail and cookies. Narrator Lanny Lee Hagen states "even remote outposts in the high arctic are touched by wings; and now civilization is but a flight away."

== Cast ==
- Bob Bainborough as Jim
- Gerry Kuipers as The Postman
- Shirley Martin as Yukon Jess
- Allan Merovitz as Arnie
- Bill Meilen as The Edmonton Doctor
- Deryck Hazel as The Rural Doctor
- Dennis Robinson as The Radio Operator
- Larry Musser as Pilot 1
- Paul McGaffey as Pilot 2
- Jim Dougall as Agent

== Pre-production ==
Stanley Ransom McMillan was hired as a special consultant for the film since he worked as a professional Canadian bush pilot in the 1930s and 1940s.

== Production ==
=== Filming ===
A list of shots and storyboard from Pilots North is held in the collection of the Provincial Archives of Alberta. Filming locations for Pilots North included multiple towns in Alberta such as St. Albert, Peace River, and Fort Vermillion, as well as American locations such as San Diego, California.

=== Score ===
The score to the film was written by Canadian composer Tommy Banks. The score included a full orchestra and was recorded on quarter-inch tape. Although the score was composed by Tommy Banks, additional arranging of harp and percussion was provided by Canadian composer Harry Pinchin. In 1982, Banks wrote "I very much enjoyed working on that excellent film" and Banks explored possibilities to continue scoring films with Roger Tilton.

== Reception ==
Following its release, the Edmonton Journal wrote that Pilots North "recalls a bold era" with "breath-taking photography." The Edmonton Journal also celebrated the film for depicting how "pilot navigators challenged the elements to supply and service the inhabitants of the [Canadian] North and open the way for present aerial routes linking Eastern and Western Canada with the North and Far South."

Pilots North premiered in Edmonton in 1981 and it was screened at the Edmonton Exhibition in 1982 on the hour and half hour every day from July 22 to 31. Pilots North was advertised in newspapers throughout Western Canada in cities such as Edmonton, Calgary, Red Deer, Saskatoon and Regina.

== See also ==
- Air transport in Canada
- Bush flying
- Geography of Canada
- Royal Canadian Air Force
