= Bibliothèque Saint-Jean =

Academic library at the university of Alberta

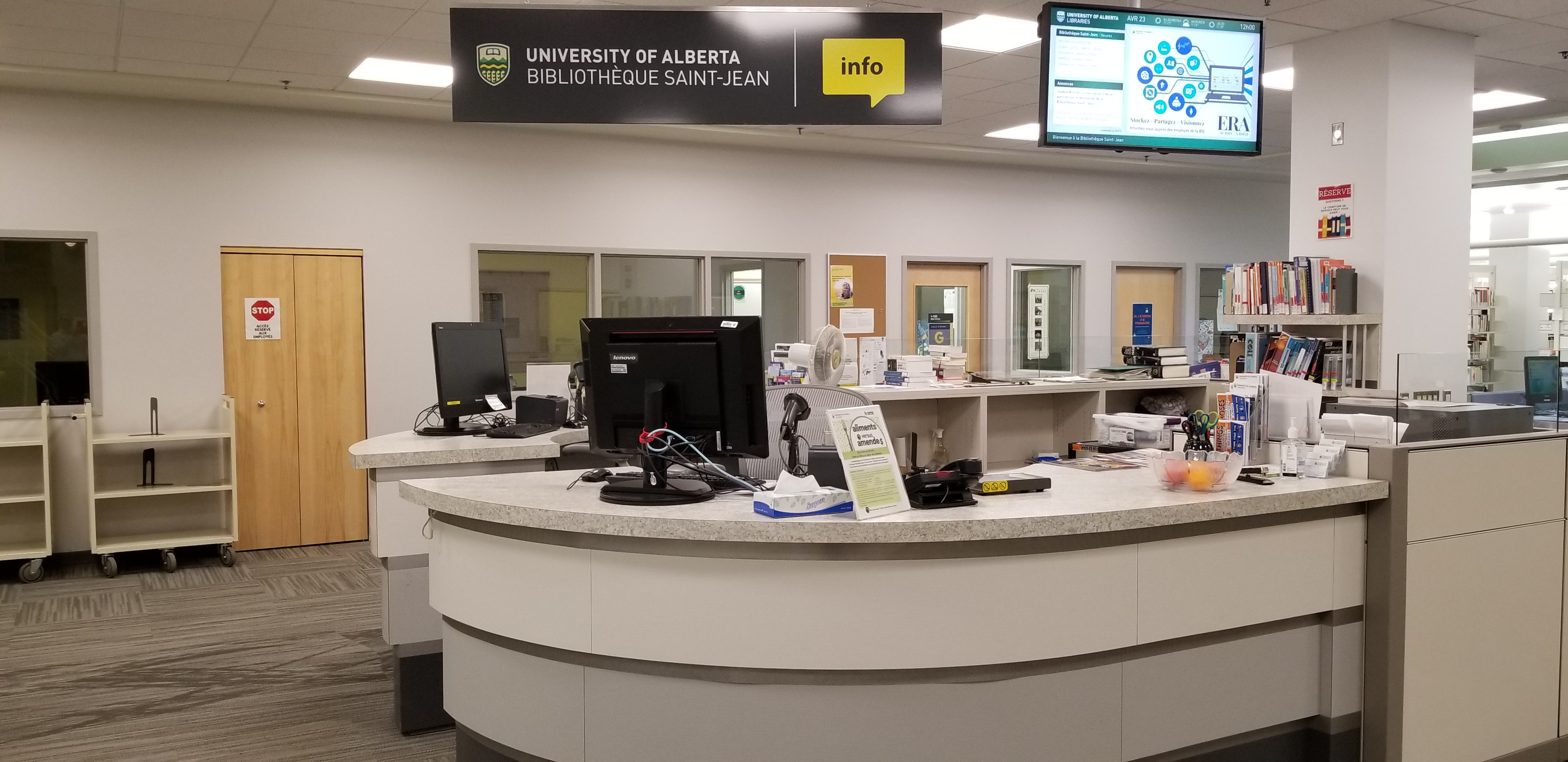
- Service counter of Bibliothèque Saint-Jean
- 53°31′28″N 113°31′28″W
- Type: University of Alberta Library
- Established: 1978

Collection
- Size: 200,000 documents and 350 periodical subscriptions.
- Criteria for collection: arts and humanities, social sciences, education, health sciences, natural sciences

Other information
- Website: www.library.ualberta.ca

Bibliothèque Saint-Jean (BSJ) is an academic and research library at the University of Alberta in Edmonton, Alberta, Canada. and part of the University of Alberta Library.

== Overview ==
The library is located approximately five kilometres east of the main University of Alberta campus. Its mission is to serve the students and professors of Campus Saint-Jean, the University of Alberta's francophone campus. However, it is open to the public; and borrowing options exist for users who do not carry a university ONEcard. As a member of the University of Alberta Libraries, BSJ is also a part of the NEOS library consortium, The Alberta Library and COPPUL. Therefore, users not only have access to the documents and services offered on site, but also to a number of collections and services offered by the other libraries in these networks.

== Collection ==
BSJ's main collection is classified according to the Library of Congress system and includes books and periodicals that support all programs of study offered at Campus Saint-Jean (arts and humanities, social sciences, education, health sciences, natural sciences). Government publications are added to the collection on a regular basis thanks to BSJ's status as a selective depository library for documents published by the Government of Canada. Furthermore, a large collection of documents on microform, including a number of historical Western-Canadian francophone newspapers and the complete EDUQ microfiche collection (all documents published in the field of education in the Canadian province of Quebec from 1981 to 1995) are available. BSJ is also a depository of the National Film Board of Canada's French films.

A collection of historical documents is located in the Salle Durocher. This collection includes rare documents in the areas of francophone history in Western Canada and works by Western-Canadian francophone authors (including but not limited to donated theses, programs of study formerly approved for classroom use by Alberta Education and other works deemed to have an historical value that cannot circulate because they are either fragile or irreplaceable). Also included in the collection are documents from the Mahe v. Alberta trial, which centered on the right of Alberta's francophone minority to separate francophone school boards. All resources found in the historical collection are indexed in the NEOS catalogue.

A collection of pedagogical and children's literature (Collection pédagogique) is mainly classified according to the Dewey Decimal system, with more recent additions to the collection classified according to the Library of Congress system. This collection was created in 1978 to meet the needs of students in the Education program at Campus Saint-Jean. It is also used by educators from other parts of Alberta and Western Canada.

Combined, these collections include over 200,000 documents and 350 periodical subscriptions. Though most documents are in French, some English-language documents are available.

== Head librarians ==
- Georges Durocher (1969–1983)
- Juliette Henley (1983–2002)
- Hélène Larouche (2002–2006)
- Tatiana Usova (2007–2017)
- Denis Lacroix (interim 2017–2019)
- Debbie Feisst (interim 2019–2020)
- Christine Brown (2020–the present)

== Partnerships and collaboration ==
The University of Alberta Library is a member of the Association of Research Libraries, Canadian Association of Research Libraries, and is a contributor to the Open Content Alliance
