= Cosmopolitan Music Society =

The Cosmopolitan Music Society
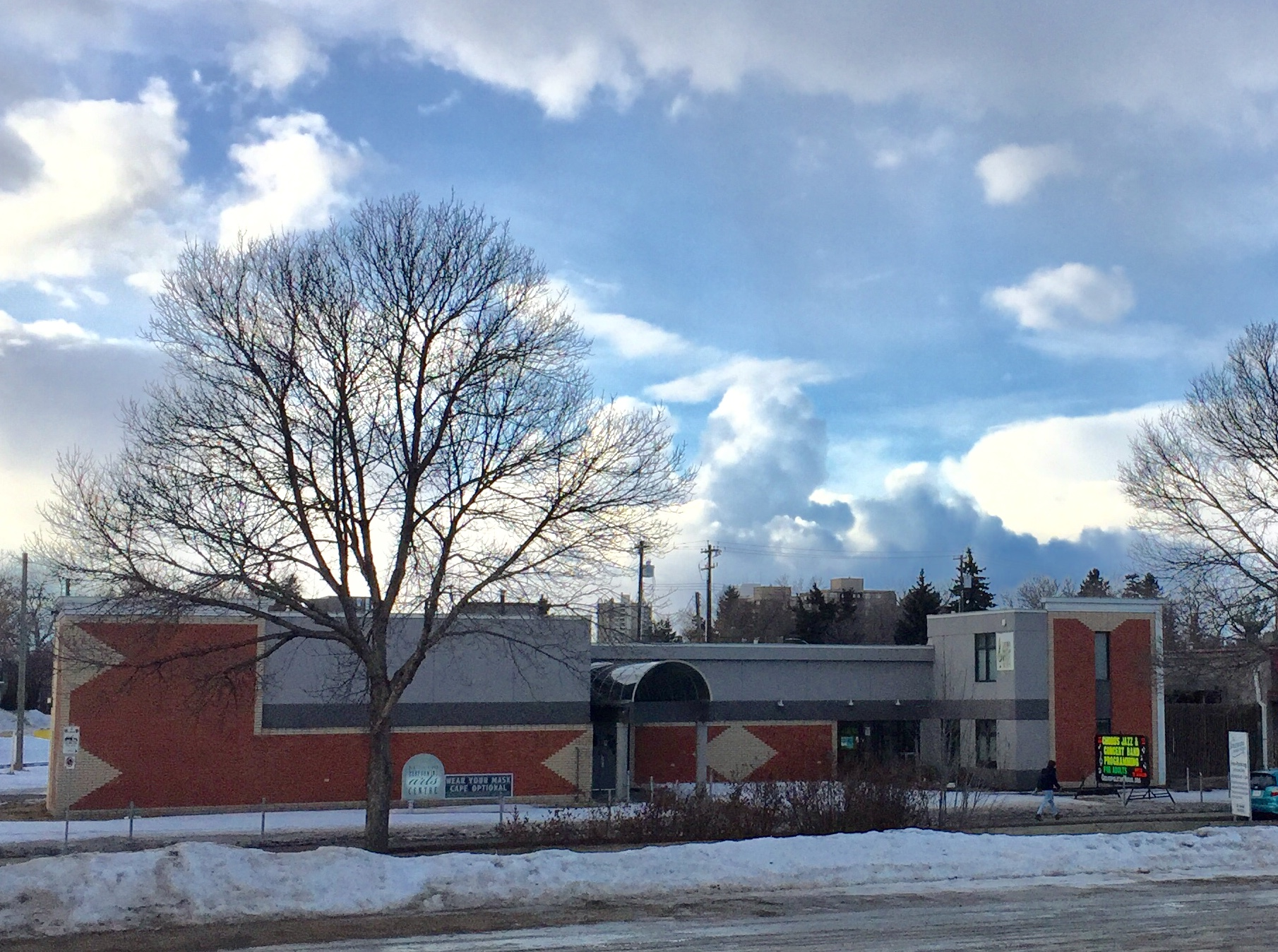
- The Cosmopolitan Music Society in 2021
- Interactive map of the The Cosmopolitan Music Society area

General information
- Location: Edmonton, Alberta, 8426 Gateway Blvd NW T6E 4B4
- Coordinates: 53.520759°N 113.495621°W

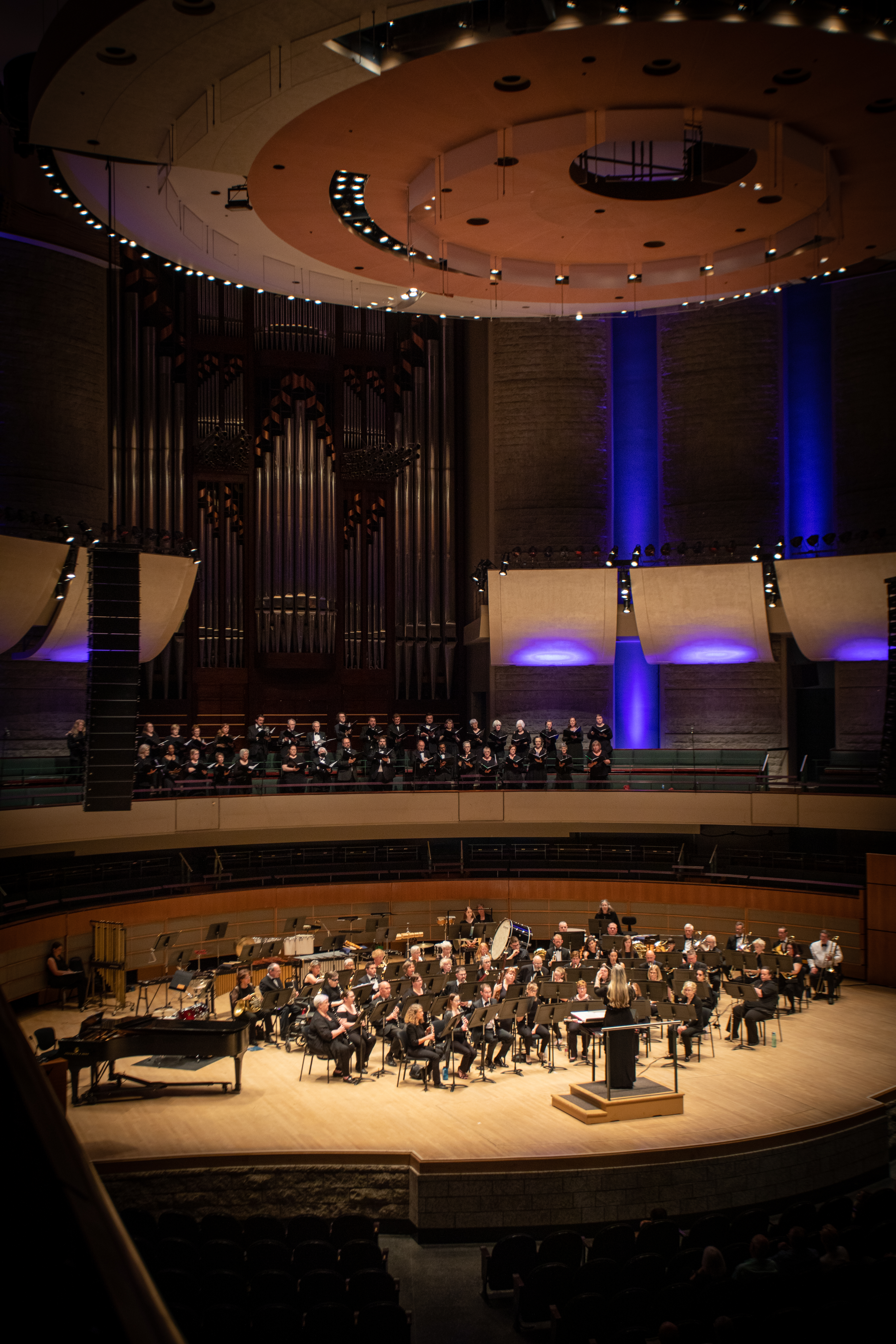
CMS choir and concert band performing at the Winspear Centre

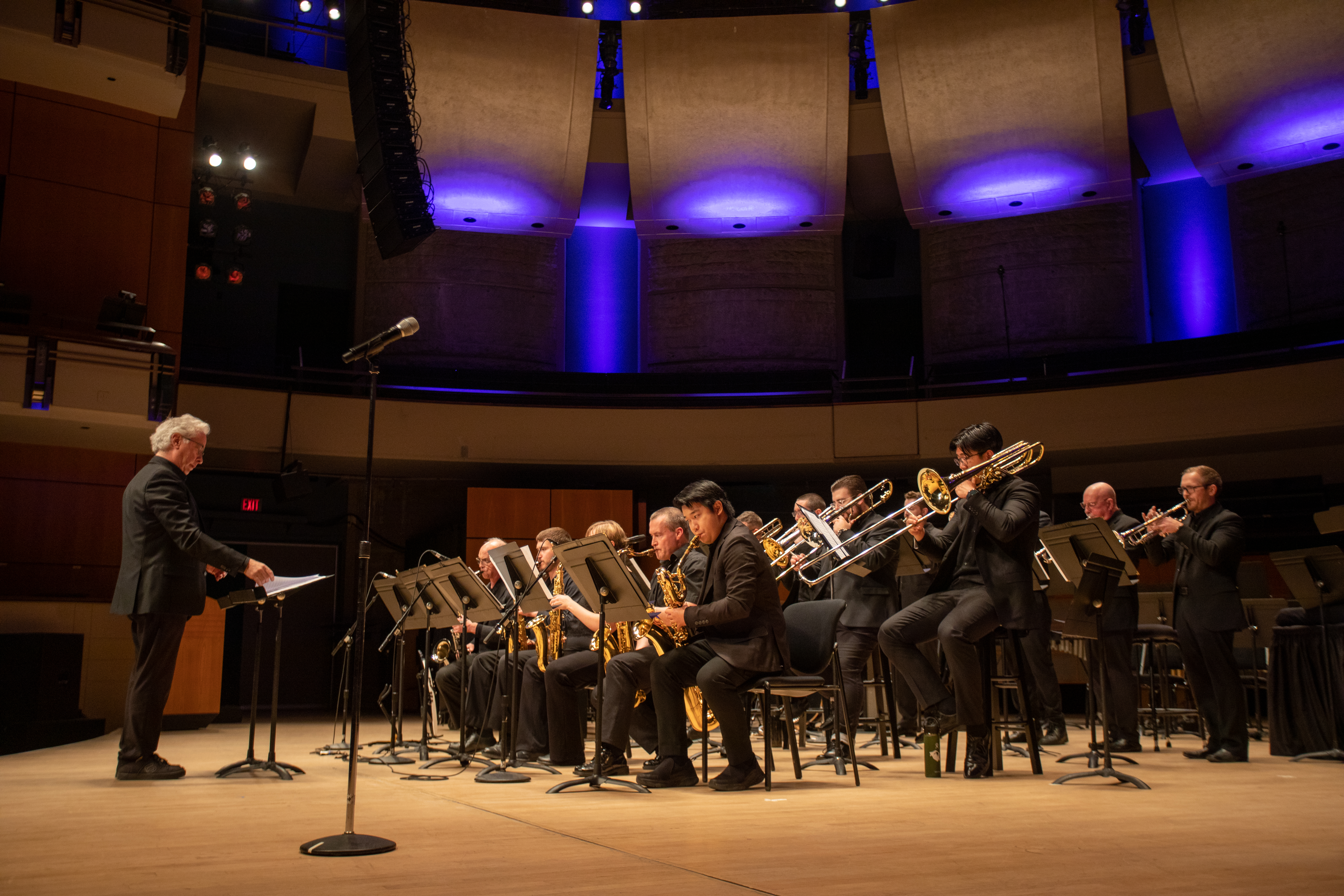
CMS Jazz Orchestra at the Winspear Centre

The Cosmopolitan Music Society is a music education non-profit organization in Edmonton, Alberta, Canada. It was created at a time when school bands were few and far between, and opportunities to learn and perform music outside of a professional setting were limited in the region. Since its inception, CMS has sought to make the learning of music more broadly accessible to the local community, providing opportunities for members to develop their skills from seasoned professionals and perform at a wide range of local events.

== History ==
In 1962, Edmonton musician Leonard Whiteley was a conductor for a small high school band rehearsing in Fort Saskatchewan. In order to grow the band to create a more robust, concert-ready sound, Whiteley sought and was granted permission to allow non-students to join and play in the group. This turned the band into a community-based ensemble, drawing in members from other nearby urban centres.

Within two years, the school division had to return to a school band model, however, a number of members from outside of the school system maintained an interest in playing. Whiteley decided to approach the Cosmopolitan Club of Edmonton, a local service club, to request sponsorship to keep the band going. They agreed, and by 1963, the Edmonton Cosmopolitan Club Concert Band was up and running.

The organization was co-founded by Canadian composer and critically acclaimed trumpet player Harry Pinchin, who took over leadership of the band in 1964 when Whiteley retired from the Armed Forces and moved to west Vancouver to direct the West Vancouver Band Association. By this point, the band had a total of 39 members.

Throughout the 1960s and 1970s, the organization held events at a range of venues in Edmonton, Alberta, all while continuing to grow its membership. By the fall of 1969, it had exploded to over 140 members. By the mid-1970s, the organization had shortened its name to the Cosmopolitan Music Society. In 1980, the Cosmopolitan Music Society began rehearsing and hosting events at its permanent location of 8426 Gateway Boulevard in Edmonton, where it remains to this day.

== Mission ==
The Cosmopolitan Music Society's mission is to "give amateur adult musicians and singers the opportunity to learn and perform quality jazz, big band, concert band and choral music." The society has several ensembles, which rehearse in the Old Strathcona Performing Arts Centre.

== Ensembles ==
The Cosmopolitan Music Society currently boasts a total of eleven ensembles. These include three handbell groups, two jazz bands, three concert bands, a chorus, a show band, and a beginner band. Auditions are held not to determine whether or not someone will be able to enter the band- membership is completely open to all ability levels, however, auditions are used to determine appropriate placement. Ensembles typically rehearse weekly.

== Events ==
CMS has a number of annual events, including but not limited to Lest We Forget, a musical tribute to Canadian war veterans held around Remembrance Day in collaboration with the Edmonton Legion. CMS also holds an annual Christmas concert, a spring concert series and various themed/novel and dance shows throughout the year as opportunities arise. Concerts are a vital opportunity for musicians to showcase their hard work and for the society to raise funds. CMS also collaborates with other local nonprofits- for example, over the summer CMS hosted a series of outdoor concerts called Mutts for Music, working with local animal shelters to raise awareness regarding animal adoption, as well as collaborating with Edmonton Pride Festival.

== Awards & accolades ==
- 1st Place – Federation of Canadian Music Festivals, Centenary Festival of Music, St. John, New Brunswick – 1967
- Government of Alberta Centennial Award – 1967
- City of Edmonton – Performing and Creative Arts Award – 1968
- Official Band – Athlete’s Village, Commonwealth Games – 1978
- Alberta Achievement Award of Excellence – Harry Pinchin, CMS Director – 1978
- National Music Award, Canadian Band Association – Harry Pinchin, CMS Director – 1978
- Official Band – Athlete’s Village, World University Games – 1983
- Completion of $500,000 Renovation & Addition Project – Cosmopolitan Studios – 1988
- City of Edmonton Cultural Achievement Award – Harry Pinchin, CMS Director – 1989
- City of Edmonton inducts into Cultural Hall of Fame – Harry Pinchin, CMS Director – 1993
- American Bandmasters Association invites into Membership – Harry Pinchin, CMS Director – 1997
- Canada Day Celebrations, Featured Band – Edmonton City Hall 1997, 1998, 1999, 2000, 2001, 2002, 2003 and Alberta Legislature, 1999, 2000, 2001, 2003, 2003, 2005
- Paul Harris Fellowship (Rotary Club of Edmonton) – Harry Pinchin, CMS Director – 2001
- Mid West Clinic International Award presented at the 55th Annual Mid West Clinic – An International Band and Orchestra Conference – Chicago, Ill. – Harry Pinchin, CMS Director – 2001
- City of Edmonton – Special Commendation for the presentation of Edmonton: A City Called Home – A Musical Portrait – April 13, 2004
