= Simona Maaskant Library =

Library in Edmonton

Coordinates: 53°31′31″N 113°25′3″W

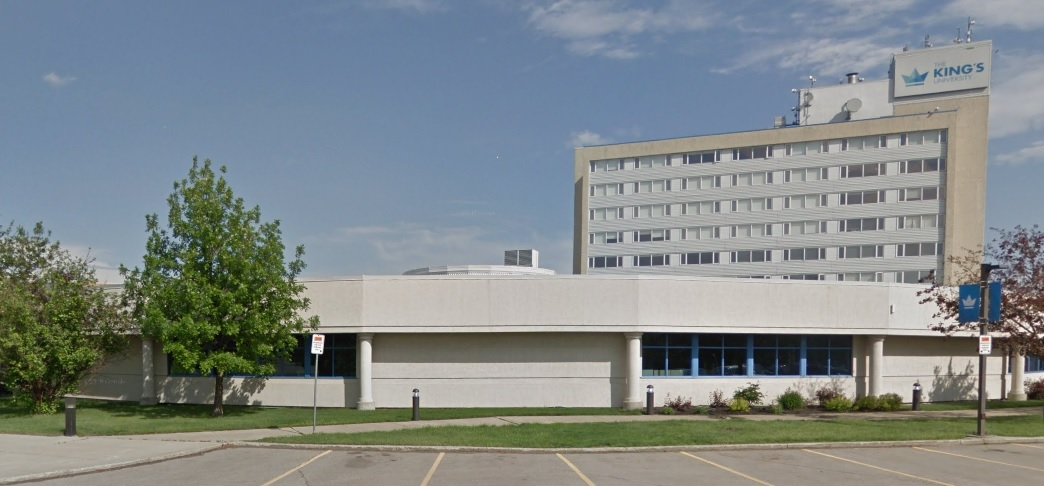
- View of Simona Maaskant Library from exterior
- Type: The King's University Library
- Established: 1981, renamed 1998
- Criteria for collection: research publications

Other information
- Website: Simona Maaskant Library

The Simona Maaskant Library is the library at the King's University in Edmonton, first opened in 1981 as The King's College Library, and renamed in 1998 after its chief librarian Simona Maaskant.

== History ==
The Simona Maaskant Library was named after Simona Maaskant, who was King's chief librarian between 1981 and 1998. On the King's University official website, the institution credits Maaskant with providing "extraordinary leadership in building the library into a beautiful and functional resource for students, faculty, and staff."

Following Maaskant's passing, the King's University introduced the Simona Maaskant Scholarship.

A handful of authors have acknowledged the use of the Simona Maaskant Library in their books, including Sidney Greidanus, Michael Cheney and Khalehla Litschel.

== Main collection ==
The Simona Maaskant Library contains over 75,000 physical materials (books and audiovisual materials) and 200,000 virtual materials such as eBooks and databases.

The library is a member of the NEOS Library Consortium therefore offering its users access to an additional 10 million materials through the consortium.

== Gerry Segger Heritage Collection ==
The Gerry Segger Heritage Collection is located inside the Simona Maaskant Library. The collection acts as a research centre for archival materials associated with Dutch-Canadians. In particular, the collection has archived papers and research materials from its namesake Gerry Segger, as well as from Dutch-Canadian entrepreneur Gerry Kuipers. The collection also contains materials on the history of Reformed Christianity in Canada.
