= Powerama Motoring Expo =

Canadian auto show

- Genre: Auto show
- Frequency: Annual
- Locations: Edmonton Expo Centre, Edmonton, Canada
- Years active: 1984-2010
- Duration: 3 days

The Powerama Motoring Expo was a Western Canadian auto show that was held annually in Edmonton, Alberta from 1984 until 2010. Powerama attracted contestants from throughout North America. (Note: For example, Rene Girard of Seattle won Best of Show in 2001. Ken Achs of Saskatoon won Best of Show in 2002.)

== History ==
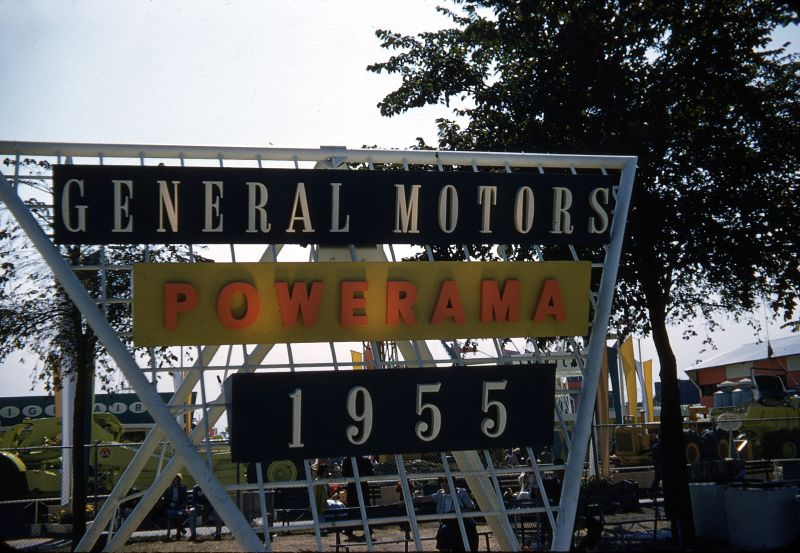
Edmonton's Powerama was one of several Powerama Auto Shows in North America. Above, a 1955 Chicago Powerama sign is shown.

The Powerama Motoring Expo was named after a historic drag race in Edmonton. From 1956 until 1966, Powerama was the name of an annual drag race that took place during Labour Day long weekend in Edmonton. (Note: In 1966, the Edmonton Journal reported that the Powerama group had been "sponsoring an annual automobile show for the past 10 years.") Eighteen years later in 1984, the Edmonton car show took its name from the city's historic drag race.

On several occasions, vehicles from the Reynolds-Alberta Museum were brought to Powerama for display.

== Notable vehicles ==
In 2005, a 1930 Model A Roadster restored by Gerry Kuipers received first prize. In 2006, a 1956 Ford F-100 pickup restored by Lorne Soloview was featured; however, first prize went to a 1955 GMC Pickup restored by Nisbet Patfield. In 2007, a canola biodiesel jet car built by Kevin Therres received attention in the press.
