= Reynolds Museum =

Museum in Wetaskiwin, Alberta, Canada

Reynolds-Alberta Museum

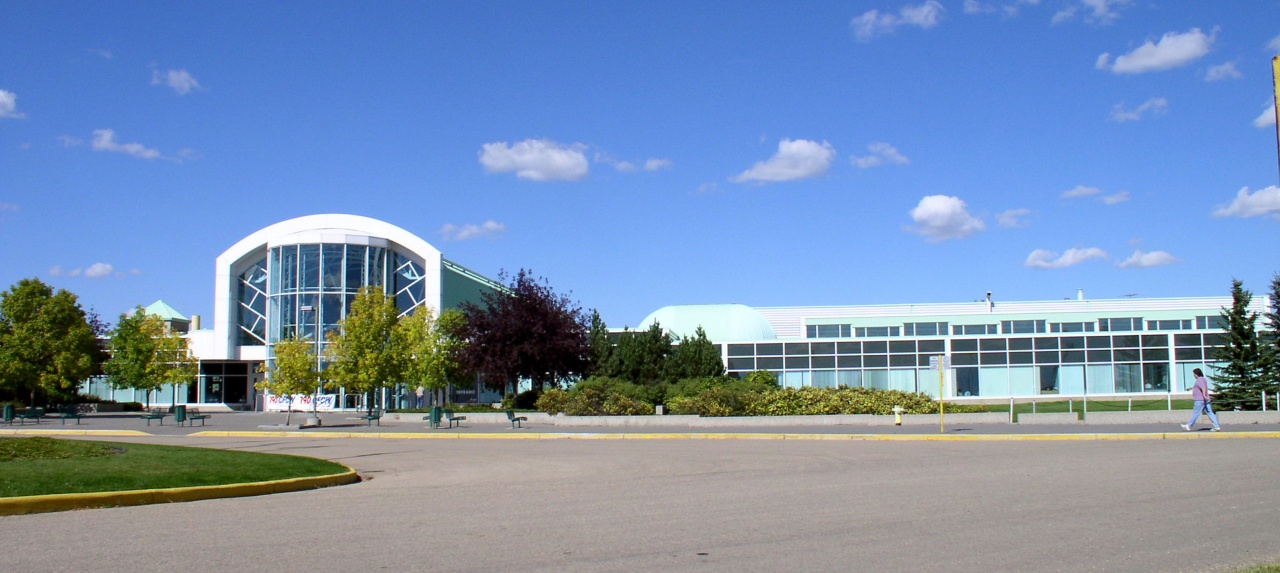
- Exterior of the museum's main building
- Established: 12 September 1992; 33 years ago
- Location: 6426 40 Avenue; Wetaskiwin, Alberta, Canada
- Coordinates: 52°57′43″N 113°25′04″W
- Type: Agricultural, industrial, transportation
- Director: Noel Ratch
- Curator: Brian Manning (agriculture and industry); Justin Cuffe (transportation)
- Architect: RPK Architects
- Owner: Government of Alberta
- Website: reynoldsmuseum.ca

The Reynolds-Alberta Museum is an agricultural, industrial, and transportation museum in Wetaskiwin, Alberta, Canada. The museum is situated on an 89-hectare (220-acre) property containing the main museum building, an aviation display hangar, and its storage facility.

The museum was initially conceived by Stan Reynolds, who had amassed a large collection of agricultural machinery, airplanes, and automobiles during the mid-20th century. During the 1980s, Reynolds donated 850 artifacts to the government of Alberta for the purposes of showcasing these items in a public museum. The provincial government opened the Reynolds-Alberta Museum to exhibit these items to the public on 12 September 1992. The institution was named after Reynolds, who eventually donated over 1,500 artifacts to the institution before his death.

The museum collection presently contains over 6,600 agricultural, industrial, and transportation artifacts. The majority of the artifacts are held in the museum's storage facility; although a number of artifacts are either on exhibit in the museum's main building and aviation display hangar, or on tour.

== History ==
Former logo

The museum's initial collection originated from the private collections of Stan Reynolds; who acquired a large number of agricultural machines, airplanes, and automobiles through trade-ins he would accept at a car dealership he operated. By 1955, Reynolds had acquired enough vehicles to open a "private museum" to exhibit his collection. Desires to have his collection permanently displayed in a public museum led Reynolds to discuss the possibility of donating the collection to the provincial government in 1974; which eventually resulted in him donating 850 artifacts to the government of Alberta between 1981 and 1986. The donation represented the largest of its kind in Canadian history.

On 12 September 1992, the government of Alberta opened the Reynolds-Alberta Museum in order to exhibit the donated items, with the institution being operated by Alberta Culture, Multiculturalism, and Status of Women. The Canada's Aviation Hall of Fame was also relocated from the Edmonton Convention Centre to the Reynolds-Alberta Museum after the building was completed The hall of fame was housed at the Reynolds-Alberta Museum until 2022, when it was relocated to The Hangar Flight Museum in Calgary. Stan Reynolds continued to donate artifacts to the museums collection after the institution opened, with Reynolds donating another 60 aircraft in 1999; the largest donation of vintage aircraft in Canadian history. In the early 2000s, several vehicles from the Reynolds-Alberta Museum were displayed at the Powerama Motoring Expo in Edmonton.

In August 2017, the provincial government announced it would provide over CA$39.5 million to the museum over the next three years; with approximately CA$34 million being used to expand the museum by 97,000 square feet (9,000 m^{2}), as well as creating an aviation storage facility. In August 2019, the federal government also committed funds towards the expansion project. However, in March 2020, Alberta Culture, Multiculturalism, and Status of Women announced that construction would not proceed as planned, with the expansion plans placed on hold.

== Site ==
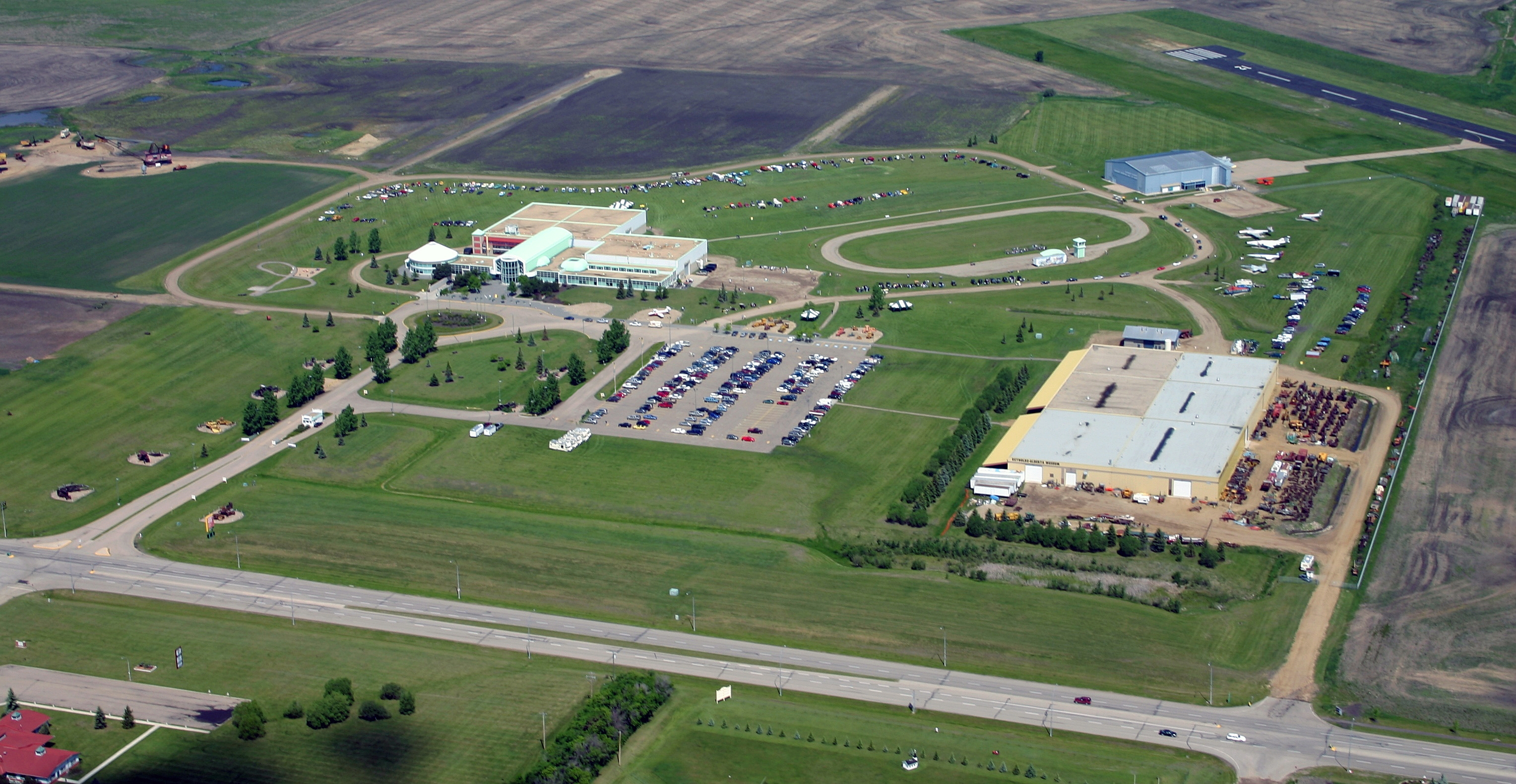
Aerial view of the museum property.

The museum is located on an 89-hectare (220-acre) property in Wetaskiwin, Alberta. The property is adjacent to Wetaskiwin Regional Airport, and is situated near the eastern portion of Alberta Highway 13 before it branches north. Three major buildings are situated on the property; the main museum building, the aviation display hangar, and the collections storage facility. RPK Architects served as the architect for the museum buildings.

The main museum building is 9,450 square metres (101,700 sq ft) and houses the museum's exhibition gallery. The gallery has a number of artifacts from the museum's collection on display, in addition to several interactive displays on mechanization and how it changed life in Alberta from the 1890s to the present. Historically themed interactive exhibits include a 1911 automobile assembly line, a 1920s grain elevator, a 1930s service station, and a 1950s drive-in theatre. Other facilities in the main museum building include a theatre, offices, a café, event venues, and a gift shop. The main museum building also houses a conservation and restoration workshop to restore its vehicles; and a library/resource centre, whose collection pertains to transportation and agricultural machinery. The museum's library contains over 1,800 publications and 18,000 trade literature items.

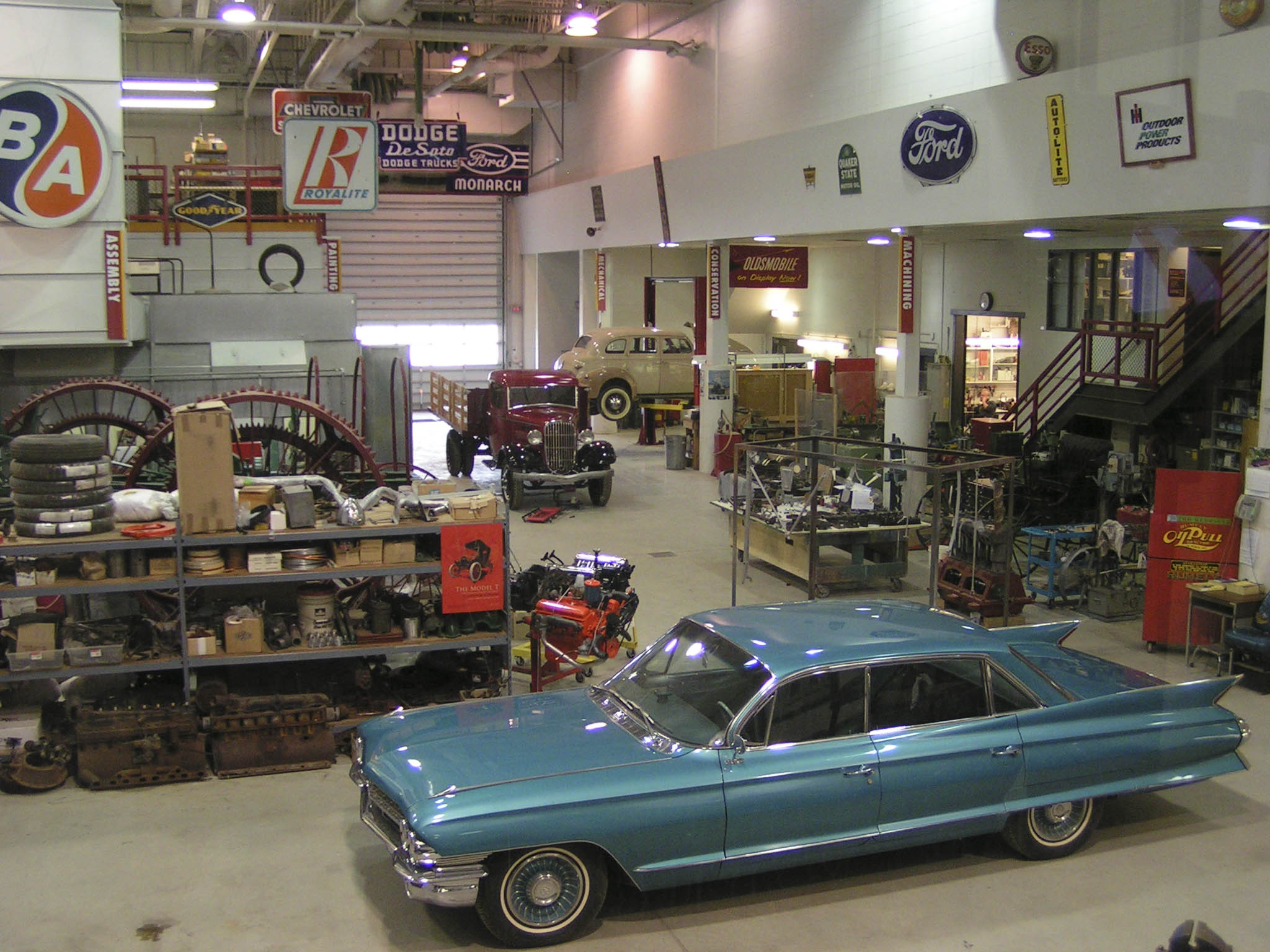
The conservation workshop inside the main museum building.

The 1,830-square-metre-aviation (19,700 sq ft) display hangar is a hangar connected to Wetaskiwin Regional Airport, and is used to exhibit airplanes from the museum's collection. Canada's Aviation Hall of Fame, which moved to the display hangar in 1992 when the museum opened, moved to The Hangar Flight Museum in Calgary in 2022.

The 10,219-square-metre-collections (110,000 sq ft) storage facility houses artifacts from the museum's collection which are not on exhibit in its main building nor at its aviation display hangar. As opposed to the other museum buildings, access to the storage facility remains limited to the public. However, the museum does provide private tours of the facility.

== Collections ==
The museum's collection originated from the private collections of Stan Reynolds, who donated a number of items to the government of Alberta in 1981, and later the museum after it was opened in 1992. Reynolds donated approximately 1,500 artifacts to the museum before his death in 2012. In addition to items donated by Reynolds, artifacts in the collection were either purchased by the museum or were gifted to the institution by members of the public, and the Reynolds Heritage Preservation Foundation.

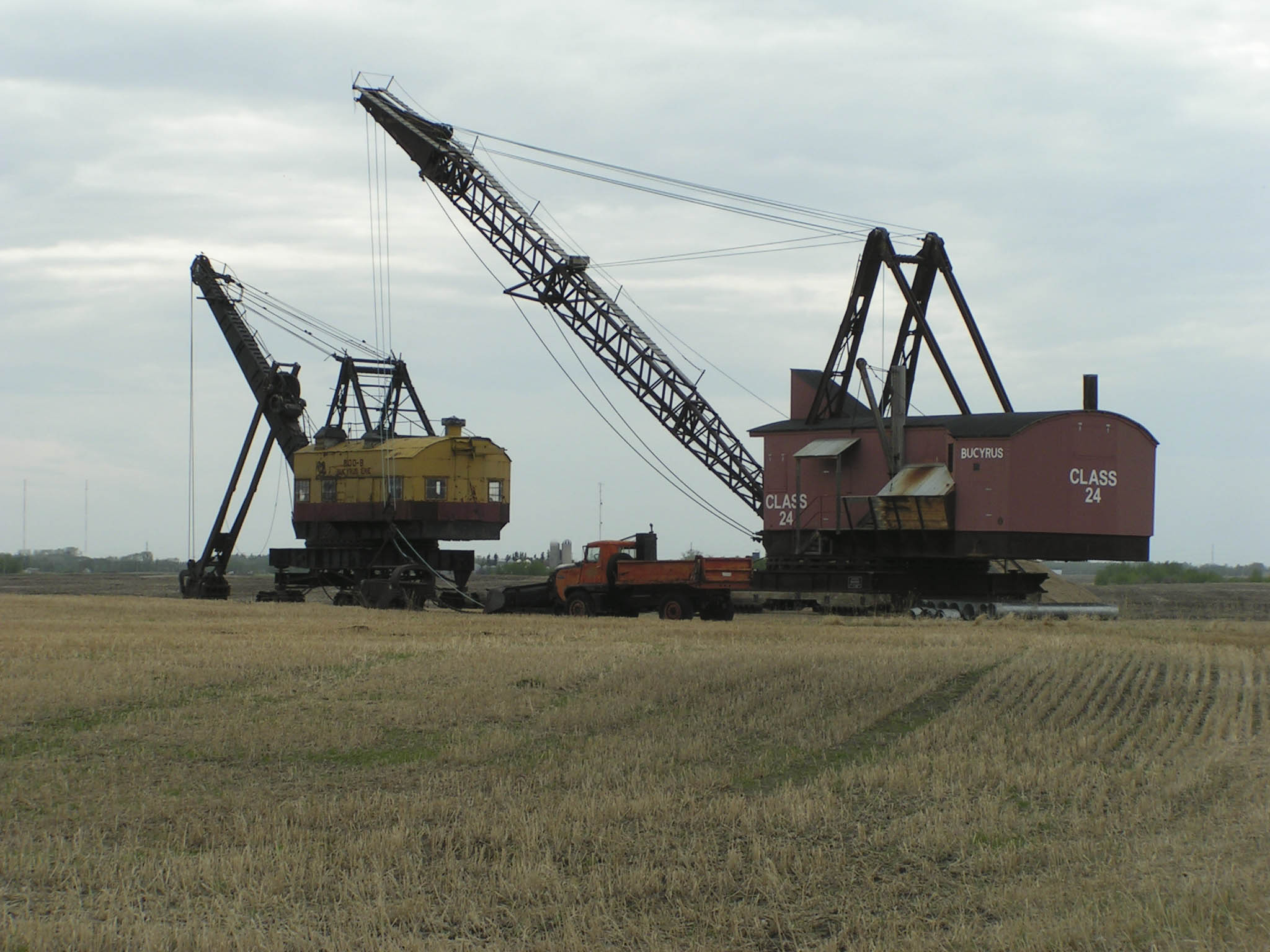
A Bucyrus-Erie 200-B power shovel, and a Bucyrus Class 24 from the museum's collection

As of April 2019, the museum's collection contained approximately 6,600 agricultural, industrial, and transportation artifacts. In addition to machinery, the museum's collection also includes a number of documents relating to mechanization in industry and transportation. More than 100 major artifacts are on display in the main museum building's exhibition gallery. However, the museum's collections storage facility holds the majority of the museum's artifacts; with over 5,000 items stored there. Several artifacts are also exhibited in travelling exhibitions as a part of the museum's artifact tour program.

The museum's agricultural and industrial collection includes 350 agricultural machines and 455 industrial artifacts; including a Bucyrus-Erie 200-B power shovel, and a Bucyrus Class 24 dragline from 1929. The Bucyrus Class 24 the world's oldest existing dragline excavator.

The museum's transportation collection also includes 537 cars, motorcycles, and trucks. Automobiles in the museum's collection include a Hupp-Yeats, a 1929 Duesenberg Phaeton Royale Model J, a 1933 Ford Fordor, and one of the two surviving 1934 Citroën P17 half-track used during the Bedaux expedition. The world's oldest known Chevrolet, a 1913 Chevrolet Series C Classic Six, is also held in the museum's collection. Newer vehicles in the museum's collection include the BugE, an electric vehicle donated to the museum. In 2018, the museum acquired one of the two McLaughlin-Buick automobiles used by the royal family during the 1939 royal tour of Canada; in addition to other related memorabilia from the tour.

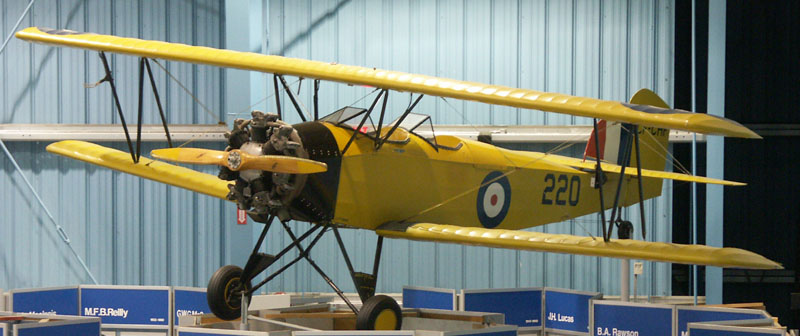
A Fleet Fawn 7C from the museum's collection suspended in the air at the aviation display hangar

The museum's collection also includes 135 aircraft; providing the institution with the second largest collection of airplanes in Canada, after the Canada Aviation and Space Museum. The museum also has the full-scale Avro Arrow model used in The Arrow miniseries.

=== Resource Centre ===
The museum's resource centre contains the largest publicly accessible library of trade literature in North America, containing more than 70,000 items including service manuals, parts catalogues, technical leaflets, periodicals, and books.

== See also ==
- List of museums in Alberta
- List of transport museums
