= Stanley Ransom McMillan =

Canadian aviator

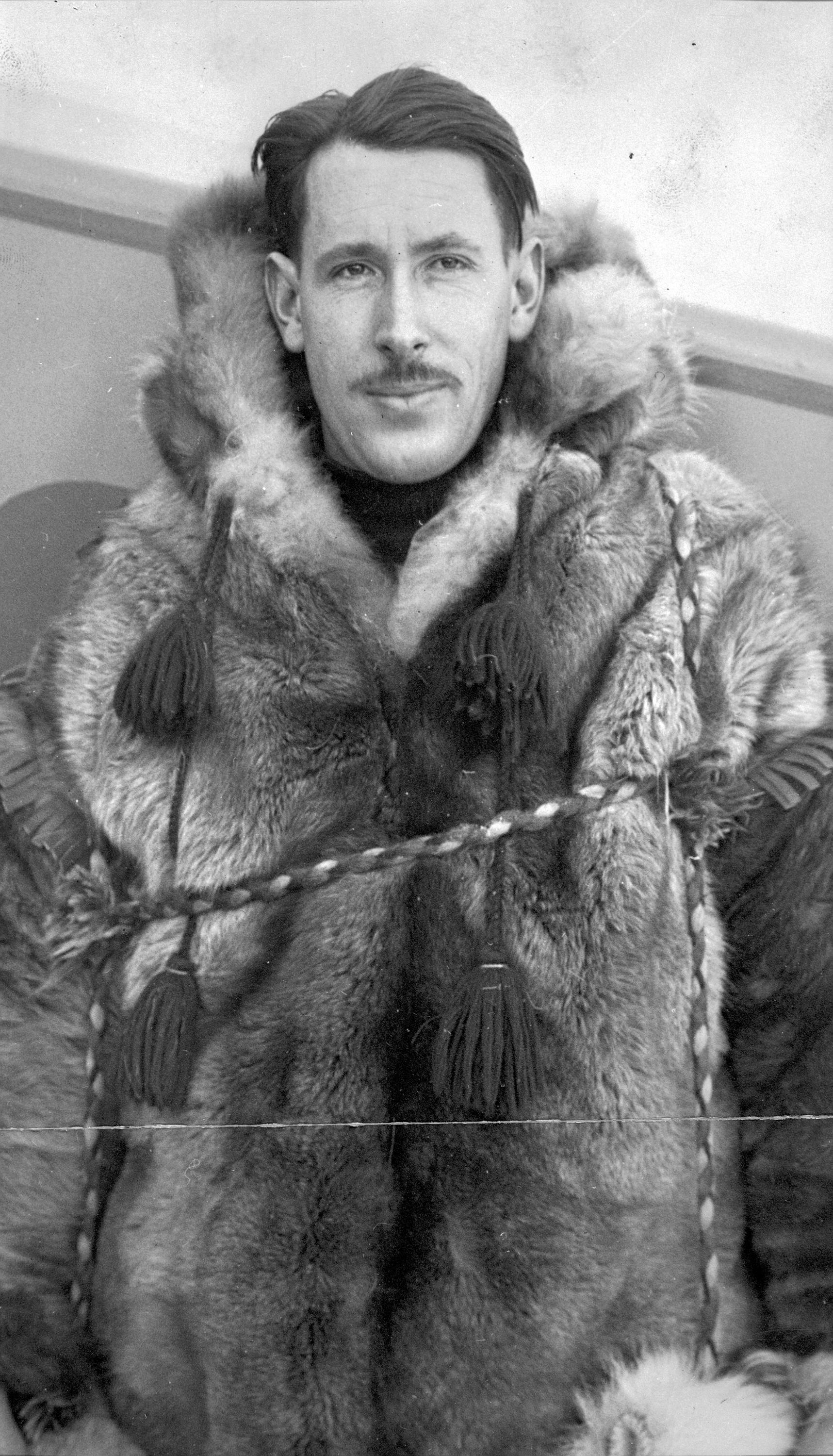
- McMillan in 1930
- Born: Stanley Ransom McMillan; 3 October 1904; Dryden, Ontario, Canada
- Died: 4 March 1991 (aged 86); Edmonton, Alberta, Canada
- Awards: Air Medal, 3 Oak leaf clusters Distinguished Flying Cross; EAME Campaign Medal; Purple Heart; Silver Star World War II Victory Medal
- Aviation career
- Rank: First Lieutenant

Stanley Ransom McMillan (3 October 1904 – 3 October 1991) was a Canadian aviator.

== History ==
McMillan was inducted into Canada's Aviation Hall of Fame in 1974. Upon induction, the awarding committee stated that McMillan had made "outstanding contributions to Canadian aviation by the unselfish application of his exceptional skills as a pilot and navigator, despite adversity, and was instrumental in designing new operational procedures in northern Canada that have benefited this nation's growth."

== In media ==
McMillan worked as a special consultant for Roger Tilton's 1982 film Pilots North.
