= Spiker (film) =

- Theatrical release poster
- Directed by: Roger Tilton
- Screenplay by: Marlene Matthews
- Produced by: Roger Tilton
- Starring: Michael Parks; Jo McDonnell; Patrick Houser; Christopher Allport
- Release date: 1986
- Country: United States
- Language: English

Spiker is an American 1986 sports drama film directed by Roger Tilton.

== Plot ==
As a sports drama, Spiker centers on the United States men's national volleyball team at the 1984 Summer Olympics. Superstar college athletes train hard to be accepted onto the team with the help of a strict coach.

== Cast ==
- Michael Parks as Coach Doames
- Christopher Allport as Newt Steinbech
- Jo McDonnell as Marcia Steinbech
- Natasha Shneider as Wanda

== Production ==
Filming for Spiker began in 1983, on a prospective budget of approximately $1 to 1.5 million. Alongside the actors, athletic professionals such as Doug Beal and Paul Sunderland were cast in the film.

== Release ==
Spiker was released to theaters in the United States during 1986. It performed poorly in theaters, leading to Tilton going out of business.

== In other media ==
It was parodied by RiffTrax on August 30, 2018.
