= Stan Reynolds =

Canadian businessman (1923–2012)

- Born: Stanley George Reynolds; May 18, 1923
- Died: February 9, 2012 (aged 88)
- Known for: Reynolds-Alberta Museum

Stanley George Reynolds (May 18, 1923 – February 9, 2012) was a Canadian businessman, collector, and aviation enthusiast. His contributions to the province of Alberta created the Reynolds-Alberta Museum in Wetaskiwin. During his life, Reynolds received many honours including a Heritage Canada Foundation Community Service Award in 1980 for heritage preservation, a Reilly Award from the Alberta Aviation Council in 1987, named Citizen of the Year by the Wetaskiwin Chamber of Commerce in 1986, inducted into Canada's Aviation Hall of Fame in 2009 and named to the Order of Canada in 1999.

== Early life ==
Reynolds was born in Wetaskiwin in 1923. His father, Ted Reynolds, was a pilot and collector. Ted also operated a local garage where his son would work after school hours. In 1942, Stan Reynolds joined the Royal Canadian Air Force and served in Great Britain as a part of a night-fighter squadron. He became one of the youngest pilots to fly Beaufighters and Mosquitos.

== After the Second World War ==
In 1945 Reynolds was discharged from the air force and returned to Wetaskiwin. He started a business selling used cars and it became one of the most successful automotive dealerships in Alberta. Reynolds would repair and paint the cars himself and studied for his welder's and auto mechanic's licenses. From 1946 to 1958 he was Alberta's top auto dealer operating 13 lots. His efforts would eventually help in establishing the Wetaskiwin Auto Mile.

As the business grew, Reynolds expanded to sell new and used trucks, farm machinery, industrial equipment, house trailers, and airplanes.

== Creation of the Wetaskiwin Airport ==
Recognizing the growing importance of aviation and needing a place to land his plane, Reynolds built and operated the Wetaskiwin airport until he transferred the facility to the City and County of Wetaskiwin in 1969. Reynolds sold the airfield to the town for $29,875, less than half the market value. To avoid a plebiscite on the issue, Reynolds agreed to receive the money in five equal installments of $5,975.00 without interest. In return, he was given use in perpetuity of the airstrip and a taxi strip between the airfield and his property.

On July 13, 1970, the agreement was signed to transfer 52 acres of land, including the runway, to the city and county.

== Growth of the collection ==
As Reynolds' business grew so did his enthusiasm for collecting. One of the slogans of his business was 'Stan takes anything in trade' and Reynolds certainly did. His first acquisition was a 1911 Overland touring car that he acquired in a trade and decided not to sell.

Reynolds started noticing that many of the machines that helped build the province were gradually disappearing. Feeling that Alberta was losing a vital part of its heritage, Reynolds extended his collection to include tractors, steam engines and airplanes. Reynolds also kept detailed files on every piece he collected.

In 1955 the size of his collection grew to the point where he could open a private museum to the public. He had collected 2,000 cars, 1,100 tractors, 500 trucks, 200 steam engines, 300 threshing machines, 800 stationary engines and 125 aircraft as well as military artifacts, Native American artifacts and toys.

Knowing that his collection represented an important part of Alberta's social and technological history, Reynolds initiated discussions with the Alberta government in 1974 about donating his collection to them so that his collection could be preserved.

== Reynolds–Alberta Museum ==
In 1981, Reynolds donated 851 machines to the Alberta government. This donation provided the foundation of the Reynolds-Alberta Museum, which opened on September 12, 1992 and is one of Alberta's provincial historic sites. The donation that Reynolds gave to the province of Alberta for all the artifacts in the museum was the single largest donation in Canadian history.

The museum was built on a 156-acre site on the west side of the Wetaskiwin airport. The government also erected an 18,300 square feet (1,700 m^{2}) hangar, which became the home of Canada's Aviation Hall of Fame. The Reynolds-Alberta Museum quickly became a major tourist attraction. In their first year they had 114,000 visitors. Reynolds continued to make donations over the years to the facility. In 1999, he made his second large contribution by donating 60 aircraft. It was the largest donation of vintage aircraft by any individual in Canadian history. This donation gave the Reynolds-Alberta Museum the second largest collection of aircraft in Canada behind the National Aviation Museum. As of February 2000, Reynolds had donated a total of $11.5 million worth of artifacts to the museum.

== Family life ==
Reynolds married Hallie Elgert and they had daughters Susan, Judith and Dianne.
