= Harry Pinchin =

Canadian trumpeter, composer and conductor

- Born: May 25, 1935 (age 90); Toronto, Ontario
- Occupations: Composer, conductor, trumpeter
- Years active: 1950–2006
- Known for: Founding the Cosmopolitan Music Society

Harry Pinchin (born May 25, 1935) is a retired Canadian trumpeter, composer and conductor.

== Career ==
Harry Pinchin was born and raised in Toronto, Ontario. After joining the Canadian Armed Forces in his twenties, Pinchin moved to Edmonton, Alberta as a member of the Princess Patricia's Canadian Light Infantry Band.

In the 1950s, Pinchin performed with the Edmonton Symphony Orchestra as principal trumpet player. In 1963, Harry Pinchin founded the Cosmopolitan Music Society in Edmonton. Throughout his musical career, Pinchin collaborated with Canadian composer Tommy Banks; for example, in 1981 Pinchin provided harp and percussion arranging for the soundtrack of Roger Tilton's film Pilots North, of which Banks was the principal score composer.

In December 2006, Harry Pinchin retired as musical director of the Cosmopolitan Music Society.

== Discography ==
Per AllMusic Guide.

- Cosmopolitan Club Concert Band of Edmonton (1973)
- Concert in the Park (1988)
- Snake Fence Country (1997)
