= Bruce Peel Special Collections =

Special collections unit of the University of Alberta Library

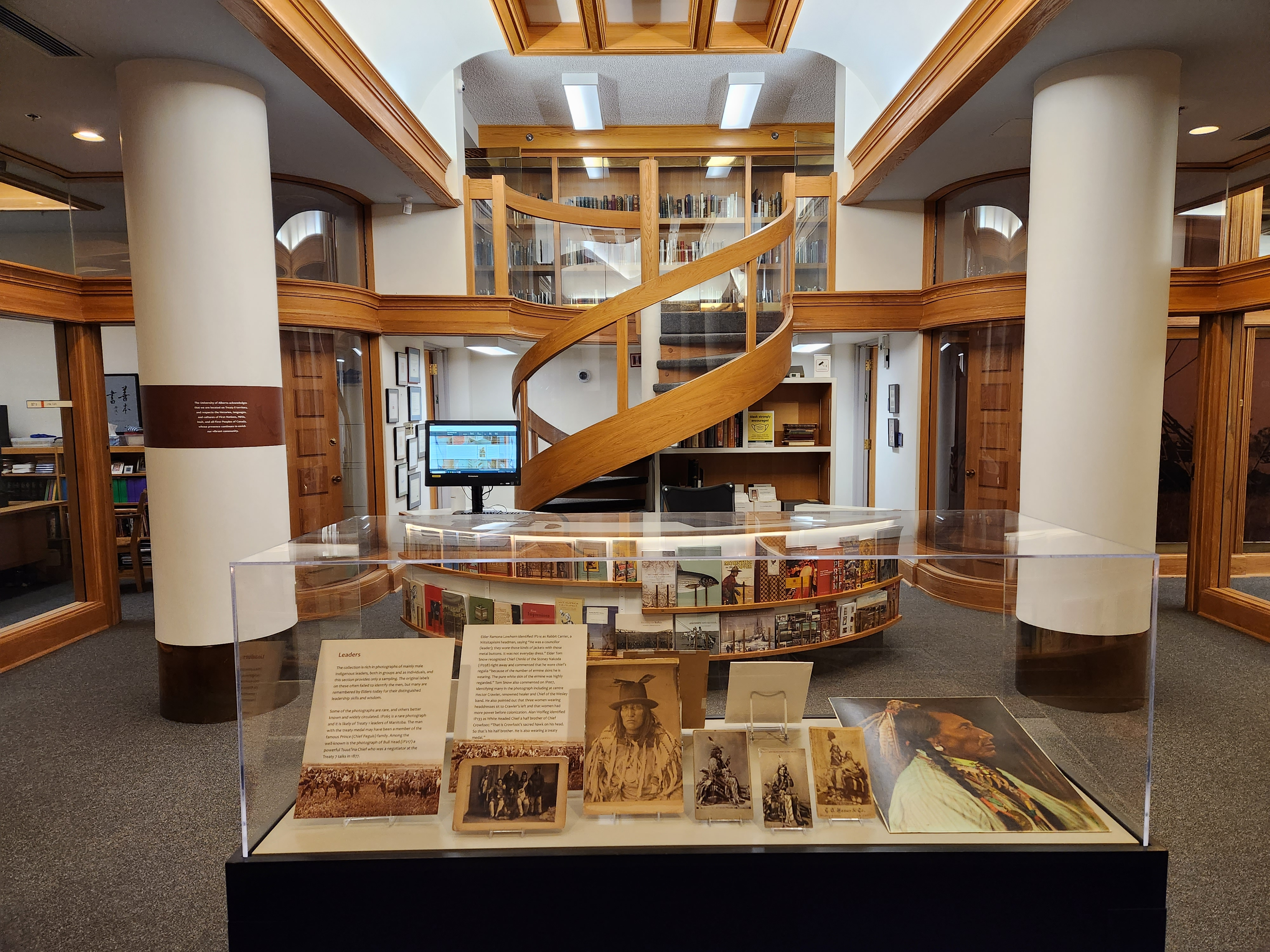
- Bruce Peel Special Collections entrance
- 53.52607123716484°N 113.5217361015987°W
- Location: Edmonton, Alberta, Canada
- Type: Special Collections
- Established: 1984

Other information
- Parent organization: University of Alberta
- Website: bpsc.library.ualberta.ca

Bruce Peel Special Collections is a library in the University of Alberta Library system that includes more than 100,000 rare books and archival materials. The library is named for Bruce Braden Peel, chief librarian at the University of Alberta from 1955 to 1982.

== About ==
The University of Alberta "Rare Book Room" was founded in 1964, when room became available in the new Cameron Science & Technology Library. Before the establishment of the rare book room, the Library had most of its collections stored on open stacks, and in 1964 the decision was made to segregate the oldest and most expensive books into a protected area. The rare book room was curated and managed by Dorothy Hamilton, who had previously served as head of the Reference Department. In 1964, the Library Committee established a special fund for purchasing special collections, and a fund of $50,000 was set aside to support the nimble purchasing decisions necessary to take advantage of "fleeting opportunities." This increased to an annual commitment of $100,000 in 1965, and the flexibility of this fund allowed the University to acquire many gems for its special collections.

When Bruce Peel retired from his post as head librarian in 1982, the library's special collections was named in honour of his contributions to the growth of the university library. In a letter to the current president, Myer Horowitz, Peel wrote, "The naming of the Library's Special Collections area was completely unexpected. I began librarianship in charge of a special collection of Canadiana so that the field of scarce, rare and valuable books has always been an interest of mine; I am very happy with the naming."

In 1984, the library's special collections were moved from Cameron library to Rutherford Library basement. In 2015-16, Bruce Peel Special Collections closed for renovations. Five floors of existing library stacks were converted into a climate-controlled space suitable for special collections. The Peel library's storage capacity grew from 3400 to approximately 9000 linear meters of shelving.

== Collections ==
The collection includes more than 100,000 rare books and a collection of archival materials that explore a range of local and international subjects. Highlighted research collections are described on the Peel website and often include a sampling of representative images. Notable collections include the 3,500-volume library of the Archbishop of Salzburg, the 8,000-volume Robert J. Woods Collection of western Americana, the Viennese Theatre Playbills Collection, the archives of Black Sparrow Press and Curwen Press, and a voluminous collection of John Bunyan’s works. Some of the library's collections have been partially digitized on the Internet Archive, such as the Indigenous Photographs Collection and the Dr. Ronald B. Madge Entomology Collection. Certain archival collections housed in the Peel library also have publicly available finding aids.

== Exhibitions ==
Each year the Bruce Peel Special Collections creates one or two in-house exhibitions that showcase elements of their collection. For most exhibitions, the Peel team publishes an accompanying exhibition catalogue, which are distributed by University of Alberta Press. The library's physical exhibitions are accessible to both the campus community and the general public for viewing.

The library also hosts digital exhibitions which are mounted on its website. Many of these digital exhibitions are related to the history of the Canadian Prairies, such as the Sam Steele, Miriam Green Ellis, and Culinaria exhibitions.

In this century, Peel's published catalogues and digital exhibitions have numerous awards, including the Katharine Kyes Leab and Daniel J. Leab American Book Prices Current Exhibition Catalogue Award from the Rare Books and Manuscripts Section of the Association of College and Research Libraries, and the UCDA Design Awards.

== Peel Workshops ==
Every academic year, the Peel library hosts a number of online and in-person workshops using materials from a variety of collections. These workshops are available to University of Alberta students through an online registration process. Previous workshops have focused on miniature books, artists’ books, preservation and conservatorship, prairie postcards, and rare book forgeries.

== Honorary Degree Books ==
Since 1987, the Peel librarians have acquired a rare book in recognition of each honorary degree recipient celebrated at convocation. Before each convocation ceremony, honorary degree recipients are celebrated at a private event, which is when they are introduced to the rare book purchased in their honour. The books are displayed in the Northern Alberta Jubilee Auditorium for the duration of convocation ceremonies each year, and are then inscribed with a special nameplate and housed in Bruce Peel Special Collections.
