= James C. Mays =

Canadian historian

- Born: November 19, 1953
- Died: January 18, 2022 (aged 68)
- Occupation: Historian

James C. Mays (November 19, 1953 – January 18, 2022) was a bilingual Canadian historian whose primary works focus on the domestic automotive industry. He lived in the Old Sandwich Town district of Windsor, Ontario from 2004.

== Studies ==
Mays earned a Bachelor of Arts degree from Andrews University in Michigan (1975). He taught elementary school in New Brunswick and Nova Scotia before graduating with a Master of Education degree from Concordia University in Montreal (1984).

== Writing career ==
The author of more than 30 books, Mays is best known for his nine automotive histories—four of which detail the inner workings of the domestic industry. His marque histories emphasize the importance of the Canadian auto industry wherever possible.

In 1997, Mays' articles appeared for the first time in the newspapers Old Autos and Old Cars Weekly. His bylines began to appear in Canadian, French, British and American periodicals. In 1998, Mays won a Golden Quill Award as editor of a national antique car club magazine.

The author of six cookbooks, Mays won Vogue magazine’s Millennium Food & Beverage Award for his 1999 release, You Can’t Get Mad Vegan Disease. He offered cooking classes to the public in the 1990s. He began teaching vegan gourmet cooking classes through the Windsor, Ontario Cultural Department in 2010.

To date Mays has written nearly 1,000 automotive history articles, mainly about the Canadian automobile industry. The author founded Syam Publishing (Mays spelled backwards) in 1997 and began publishing Canadian automotive histories bypassed by mainstream publishers. His first titles were Rambler Canada: The Little Company That Could and the American Motors Century. His centennial offering, Ford and Canada: 100 Years Together, received critical acclaim.

In 2002, Mays donated his automobilia collection to the University of Windsor. In 2006, Mays suffered cardiac problems and a stroke. In 2008, he donated his large collection of rare automotive books, literature, audio-taped interviews with automotive executive and other auto memorabilia to the University of Windsor. Mays continues to lecture, write and research on a limited basis.

A member of the Society of Automotive Historians and the Canadian Automotive Historians Society, Mays is also active in local history and heritage. He is a member of the South Western Ontario Heritage Council, sat on the War of 1812 Bicentennial Committee for the region and wrote the history column for the Scoop, a Windsor labour newspaper.

Mays has shows on CBC Radio One in Windsor and Whitehorse, Yukon. His blogs include Old Cars Canada and The Adventures of Charles the Bear Cub. In 2009, Mays was named Artistic Director of The Crosstown Players Theatre, Inc. and became the in-house playwright for the LGBTTQQIA theatre troupe in Windsor.

== Awards and honours ==
In 1998 he won a Golden Quill Award.

In 2002, his book, Rambler Canada was voted "best read" by the Ontario Librarian's Association.

In 2016, Andrews University cited James C. Mays as one of the school's 35 most notable alumni in its 143-year history.

== Selected automotive bibliography ==
- Rescued & Restored: Canadians and their Collectable Cars (2000)
- Rambler Canada: The Little Company that Could (2002)
- The American Motors Century (2002)
- From Kenosha to the World: The Rambler, Jeffery and Nash Truck Story, 1904-1955 (2003)
- Ford and Canada: 100 Years Together (2003)
- Ford Ranchero 1957-1979 Photo History (2004)
- The Savvy Guide to Buying Collector Cars at Auction (2006)
- Ford of Canada: 1904–2004 An Old Autos Pictorial Roll Call
- A Car and a Refrigerator Go to War: Nash-Kelvinator in World War Two (2012)
- National Snapshot: Canada and the Automobile in the 20th Century (http://www.nationalsnapsotcanada.blogspot.ca/)

== Cookbooks ==
- Stuff I Ate at Your House (1995)
- You Can’t Get Mad Vegan Disease (1997)
- You Can’t Get Mad Vegan Disease, The Sequel (1998)
- You Can’t Get Mad Vegan Disease, Volume Three (1999)
- Have Yourself a Very Vegan Christmas (2001)
- The Mad Vegan Does Dessert (2002)
