= University of Alberta Library =

Library system of the University of Alberta

- 53.5259°N 113.5239°W
- Location: Edmonton, Alberta, Canada
- Type: Academic library system of the University of Alberta
- Branches: 11

Collection
- Items collected: More than 5.4 million books, 1.9 million e-books, including more than 140,000 scholarly ejournals, 806 online databases, 120,000 digitized books, 67,000 newspaper issues, and 20,000 images and maps
- Size: 8,191,408

Access and use
- Circulation: 461,204

Other information
- Director: Dale Askey (Chief Librarian)
- Website: library.ualberta.ca

The University of Alberta Library is the library system of the University of Alberta.

The University of Alberta Library has 11 branches and divisions at the University of Alberta's Edmonton campuses and at University of Alberta Augustana Campus.

As of September 2019, the Library's collection comprises more than 5.4 million titles and over 8 million volumes, including 140,000 scholarly ejournals, 1.92 million ebooks, 806 online databases, 120,000 digitized titles and 67,000 newspaper issues. The Library collection of 20,000 images and maps includes many records pertaining to the Canadian prairies.

== History ==
The University of Alberta was founded in 1908, but a free-standing library branch, Rutherford Library, did not open until 1951. The university's founder, Alexander Cameron Rutherford, and its first president, Henry Marshall Tory, worked with faculty members and the first librarian, Eugenie Archibald, to select the first purchases to start the University Library in 1908. The record of these first 200 selections is still housed in the University Archive and includes a set of the works of Edgar Allan Poe; fourteen volumes of the works of Washington Irving; and various works by Walter Scott, Jean Froissart, Henry Fielding, Charles Lamb, George Eliot, Edward Gibbon, T. B. Macaulay, Robert Louis Stevenson, William Shakespeare, Jane Austen, Victor Hugo, John Richard Green, Henry Hallam, Tobias Smollett, Rudyard Kipling, and John Stuart Mill. By the end of 1911, the Library had acquired more than 7,000 volumes. By the end of Tory's tenure as president in 1928, the library owned 32,500 volumes.

During the first few decades of the university's operations, library staff operated a small facility in the Main Teaching Building, or Arts Building, which had already become overcrowded by the 1930s. In 1947, during the tenure of President Robert Newton (1941–50), the university received approval from the provincial government to begin construction of a library building. When construction was completed on Rutherford Library, it was the first new permanent building on campus in 30 years.

=== Chief Librarians ===
- Eugenie Archibald (1909–1911)
- D. E. Cameron (1911–1945)
- Marjorie Sherlock (1945–1955)
- Bruce Braden Peel (1955–1982)
- Peter Freeman (1982–1989)
- Ernie Ingles (1989–2013)
- Gerald Beasley (2013–2017)
- Dale Askey (2018–2026)
- Weiwei Shi (interim) (2026– )

== Major Branches ==
=== Augustana ===
The Augustana Campus Library provides services and resources to support undergraduate students and teaching faculty at University of Alberta Augustana Campus.

=== Bibliothèque Saint-Jean ===
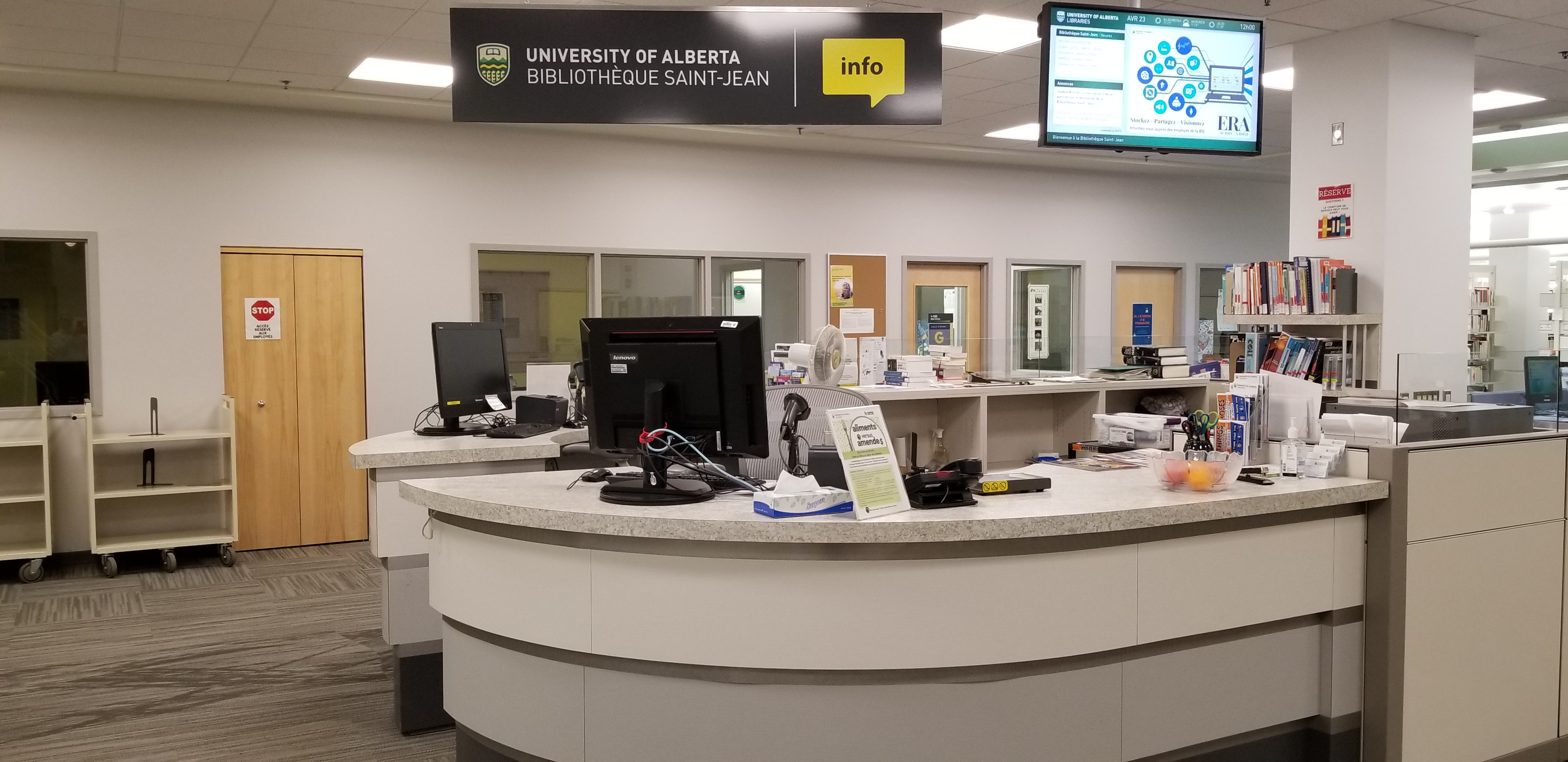
Service counter of Bibliothèque Saint-Jean

Bibliothèque Saint-Jean supports the teaching and research programs of the University of Alberta Campus Saint-Jean in education, arts and social sciences, languages and literature, health sciences, natural sciences and business administration.

=== Cameron Science & Technology Library ===
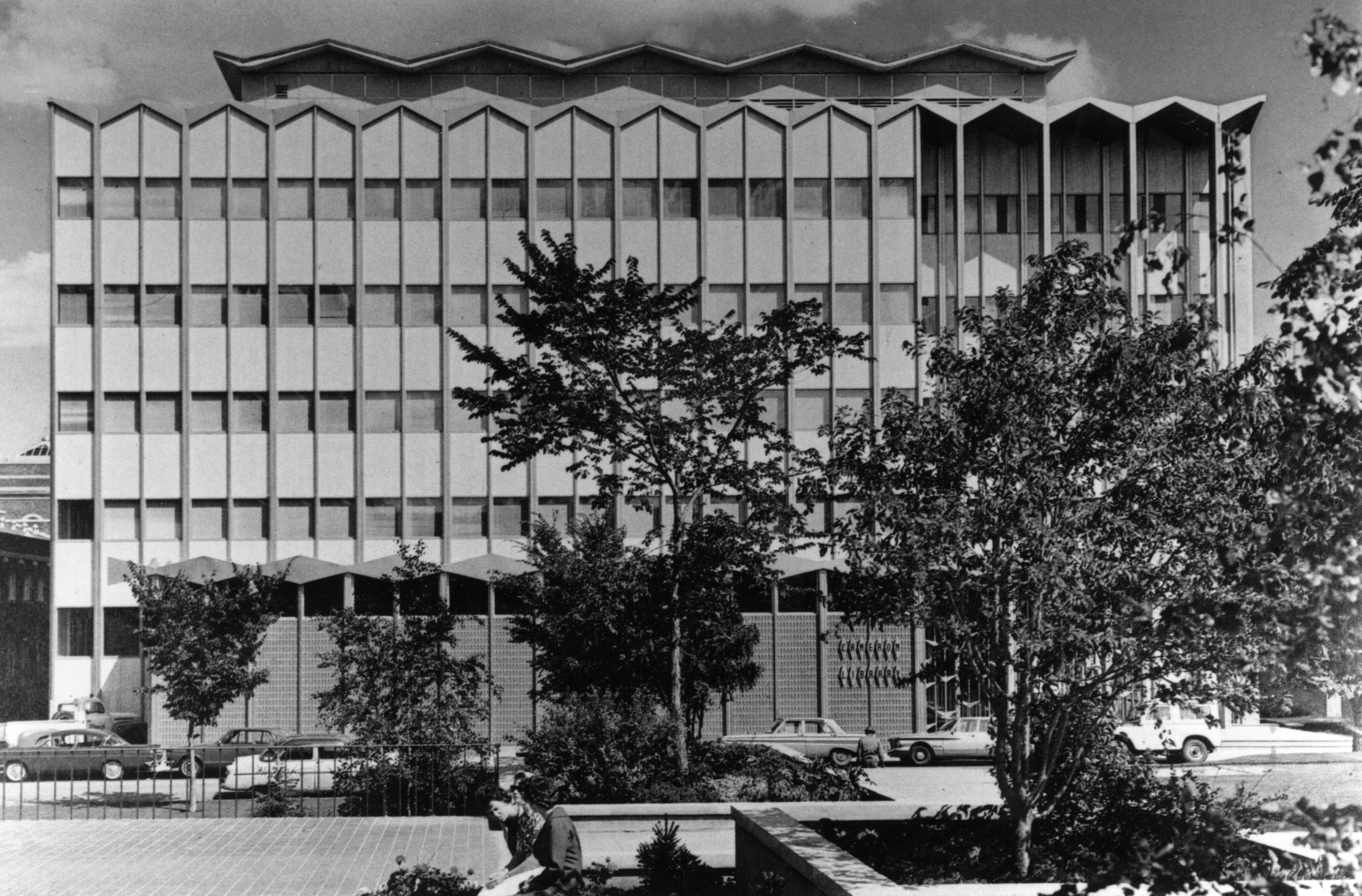
Cameron Library, ca. 1960s. Source: University of Alberta Archives Photographs Collection

Cameron Science & Technology Library collections are focused on the faculties of Engineering, Science, and ALES (Agricultural, Life and Environmental Sciences). The library is also home to the William C. Wonders Map Collection and the Canadian Circumpolar Collection.

=== Coutts Education and Kinesiology, Sport, and Recreation Library (closed) ===
Herbert T. Coutts Library provides services and resources for the faculties of Education and Kinesiology, Sport, and Recreation. In June 2020, the permanent closure of the Coutts library was announced due to budget cuts.

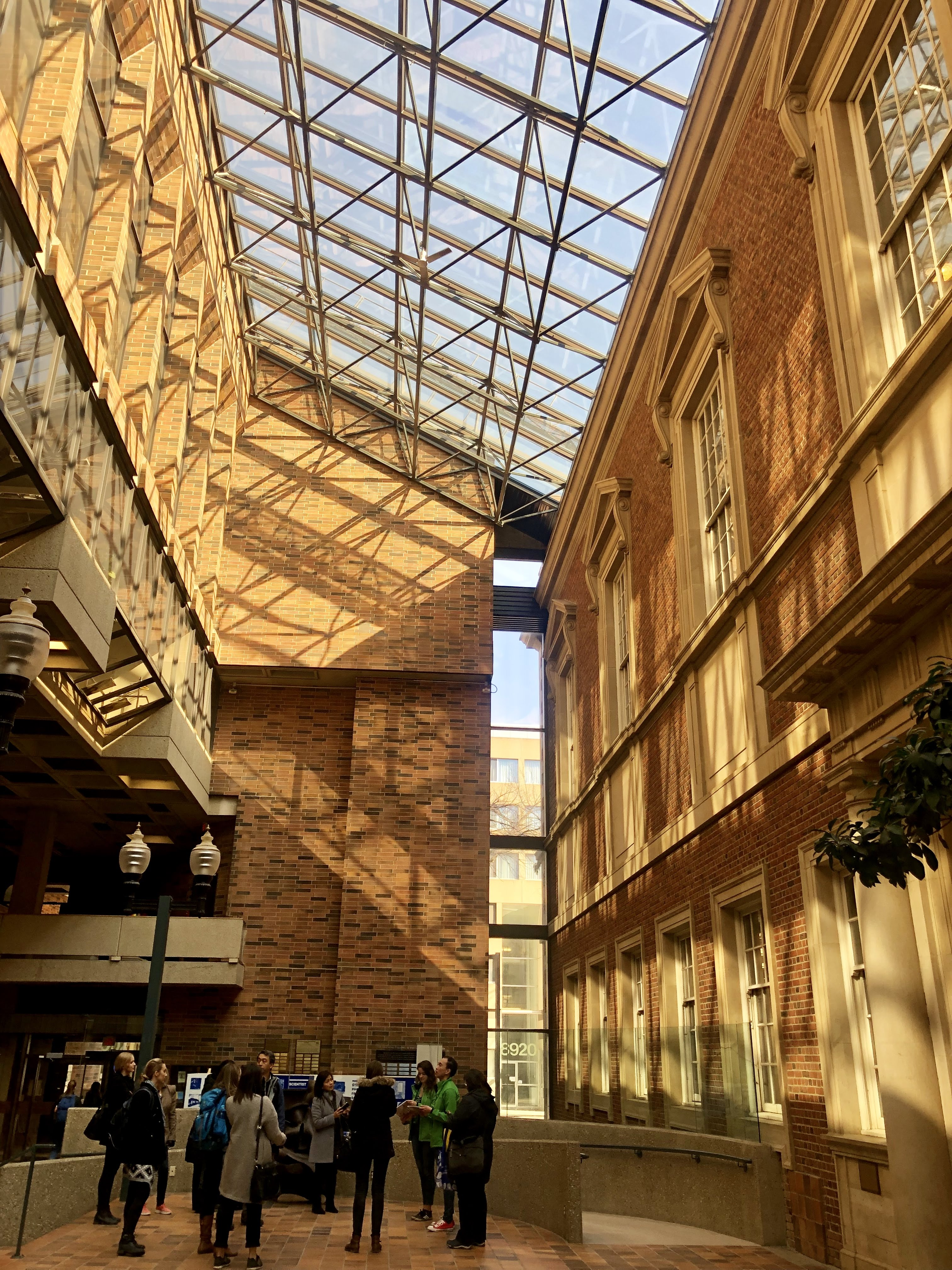
The Rutherford Library south (old building) and north (new addition) are joined by a sky-lighted galleria.

=== Rutherford Humanities, Social Sciences + Education Library ===
The Rutherford Humanities, Social Sciences + Education Library is the second largest research library in Canada and the biggest library at University of Alberta.

=== Geoffrey and Robyn Sperber Health Sciences Library ===
The Geoffrey and Robyn Sperber Health Sciences Library opened on September 29, 2023. It is located on the ground level of Dianne and Irving Kipnes Health Research Institute (formally Edmonton Clinic Health Academy, ECHA) and replaced the John W. Scott Health Sciences Library, which closed on August 11, 2023. The library's physical collection consists of health sciences materials, and now also features an ongoing exhibit of the Dentistry Museum Collection, Indigenous Learning Space, a Media Lab, VR Lab, and 3D printing services.

=== Weir Law Library ===
The Weir Library's research collection includes primary and secondary materials mostly from common law Anglo-American jurisdictions, although it does include some French language material from Quebec. The collection primarily contains material focused on common law, but also includes civil law material from Quebec, Scotland, and Louisiana. The library's Canadian government documents collection includes parliamentary and legislative materials and administrative decisions from both the federal and provincial level.

=== Winspear Business Library (closed) ===
The Winspear Business Library was the primary information service library for the Alberta School of Business at the University of Alberta. In April 2020, the Chief Librarian announced the permanent closure of the Winspear Business Library due to budget cuts; Winspear officially closed on May 1, 2020.

== Other Library Units ==
=== University of Alberta Archives ===
Located in the new Research & Collections Resource Facility on South Campus, the Archives holds 9,000 linear metres of permanently valuable records in University of Alberta history, including institutional records and private papers from people in the university community including alumni, employees, and students, as well as other organizations related to the university. The Archives are designated a Class A Movable Cultural Property by the Government of Canada.

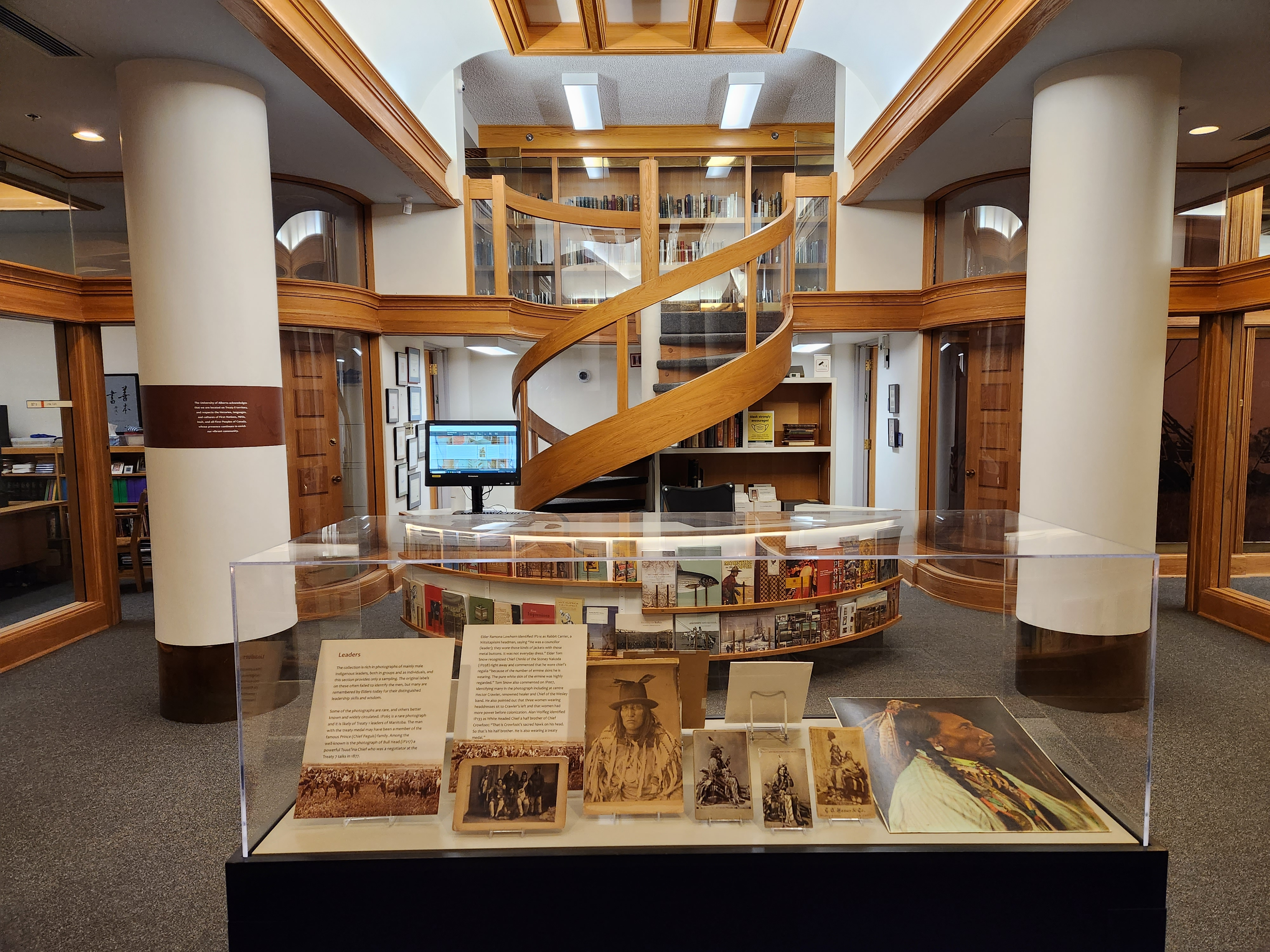
Front lobby of Bruce Peel Special Collections.

=== Bruce Peel Special Collections ===
Bruce Peel Special Collections contains over 100,000 rare books and additional archival materials. The Collections are designated a Class A Movable Cultural Property by the Government of Canada.

=== Digital Scholarship Centre ===
The DSC is an academic centre located on the second floor of Cameron Library on the university's North Campus, which opened in September 2019. 8,000 sq. feet centre is a hub for digital scholarship on campus and contains a virtual reality lab, a sound booth, 3D printing and scanning, gaming-quality computers, an Ideum touch table, a large-scale, multi-touch visualization wall, and collaboration work spaces.

=== University of Alberta Press ===
Founded in 1969, the University of Alberta Press is a unit of the University of Alberta Library responsible for publishing scholarly books.

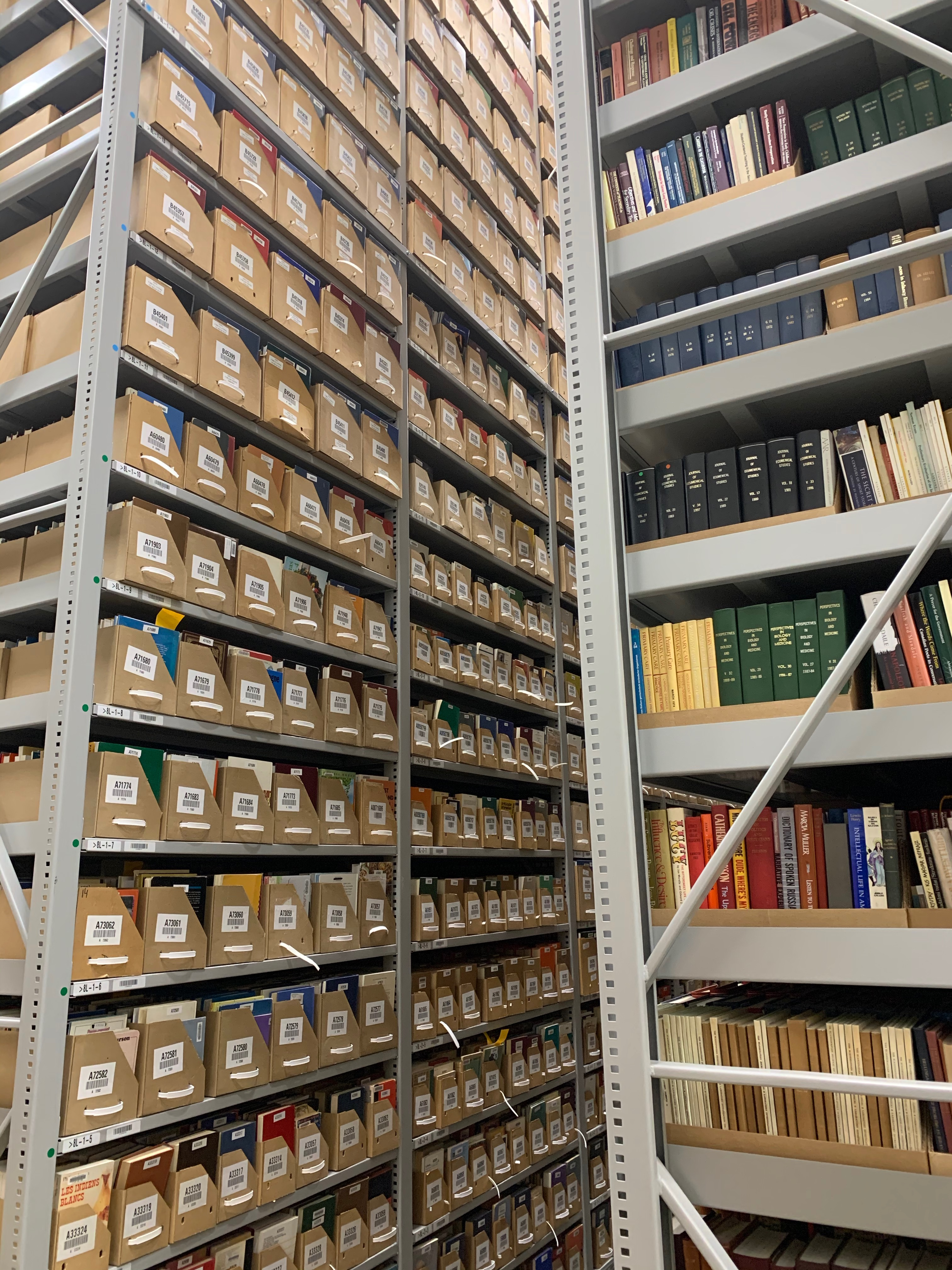
Storage shelving inside the RCRF

=== RCRF Depository Library ===
The Research & Collections Resource Facility (RCRF) facility was built to house the library's growing Depository Library and opened to the public in July 2018. The facility provides storage for over 3.5 million items from the Library system that are not as often accessed by the university community. The RCRF also contains the University of Alberta Archives and is the location for a new digitization centre in partnership with the Internet Archive. RCRF is located near the Saville Community Sports Centre and University of Alberta Farm on South Campus.

=== St. Joseph's College ===
The library is located in and provides services and resources for St Joseph's College, Edmonton. It is located in the basement of the college's east wing. The library houses 25,000 books as well as DVDs and other printed materials. The collection features materials on Christian theology, Catholic studies, ethics, the Bible, and philosophy.

== Partnerships and collaboration ==
The University of Alberta Library is a member of The Alberta Library, the Canadian Association of Research Libraries, the Association of Research Libraries, and the NEOS Library Consortium. The Library has a partnership with the Internet Archive, for the digitization and open access provision of material from across the university, including 22,000 master's and PhD theses, highlights from the Bruce Peel Special Collections, and historic postcard and playbill collections. Other Library partnerships include the Public Knowledge Project, the HathiTrust, and the Lois Hole Campus Alberta Digital Library.
