= Roger Tilton =

American filmmaker and documentarian (1924–2011)

- Born: January 14, 1924; East St. Louis, Illinois, United States
- Died: May 22, 2011 (aged 87); San Diego, California
- Occupations: Filmmaker, documentarian
- Known for: Omnimax; Garden Isle
- Spouse: Pat Tilton

Roger Tilton (1924–2011) was an American filmmaker and documentarian. Tilton has been recognized as a pioneer in the development of IMAX large screen film format due to his work in the Omnimax format in the 1970s and 1980s.

== Background ==
Roger Tilton was born in East St. Louis in 1924. During World War II, Tilton served as a combat merchant marine in the U.S. Navy. He received a Bachelor of Arts from Stanford University, a Master of Arts from Columbia University, and a Master of Fine Arts from the University of Iowa. In the 1950s, Tilton taught film at Columbia University and the City College of New York.

== Career ==
In the 1950s, Roger Tilton founded a film company named Roger Tilton Films, Inc. Roger Tilton was an innovator in the development of Omnimax film technology. In 1968, Tilton was awarded at the Atlanta Film Festival. In addition to his work in cinema, Tilton also directed advertisements for television.

=== Jazz Dance ===
In his 1954 film Jazz Dance, Tilton attempted to illustrate jazz music through film. In 2002, David Butler wrote that Tilton conceived Jazz Dance "as a response to the fact that 'so many films on jazz have been phony, plaster-of-Paris glamorizations of jazz. What is needed is a film which will let people experience real jazz.'" The soundtrack to the film features American jazz musicians Willie "The Lion" Smith, Pee Wee Russell, and Pops Foster.

=== Pilots North ===
Tilton's 1981 documentary Pilots North discusses bush pilots in the Canadian North. Following its release, the Edmonton Journal wrote that Pilots North "recalls a bold era" with "breath-taking photography." The Edmonton Journal also celebrated the film for depicting how "pilot navigators challenged the elements to supply and service the inhabitants of the [Canadian] North and open the way for present aerial routes linking Eastern and Western Canada with the North and Far South." Pilots North was narrated by Lanny Lee Hagen and Canadian aviator Stanley Ransom McMillan worked as a technical advisor for the film. The score to the film was written by Canadian composer Tommy Banks.

=== Spiker ===
Tilton's 1985 feature film Spiker was a sports drama film centered on the United States Olympic volleyball team at the 1984 Summer Olympics.

== Personal life ==
Roger Tilton was married to Pat Tilton. Roger Tilton died on 22 May 2011.

== Filmography ==
Year	Title	Director	Writer	Producer
1954	Jazz Dance	Yes	Yes	No
1958	Seven Guideposts to Good Design	Yes	Yes	Yes
1967	Revolution in Industrial Power	Yes	Yes	No
1968	Shelter: The Psychological Aspects of Disaster Nursing	Yes	Yes	Yes
1973	Garden Isle	Yes	No	No
1973	Standing Up Country	Yes	No	No
1975	Viva Baja	Yes	No	Yes
1979	The Force	Yes	No	Yes
1981	Pilots North	Yes	No	Yes
1985	Spiker	Yes	Yes	No

== See also ==
- OmniMax
