= Censorship in Mexico =

Censorship in Mexico includes all types of suppression of free speech in Mexico. This includes all efforts to destroy or obscure information and access to it spanning from the nation's colonial Spanish roots to the present. In 2016, Reporters Without Borders ranked Mexico 149 out of 180 in the World Press Freedom Index, declaring Mexico to be “the world's most dangerous country for journalists.” Additionally, in 2010 the Committee to Protect Journalists (CPJ) reported that Mexico was "one of the worst nations in solving crimes against journalists."

Under the current Mexican Constitution, both freedom of information and expression are to be protected under the legislation from Article 6, which states that "the expression of ideas shall not be subject to any judicial or administrative investigation, unless it offends good morals, infringes the rights of others, incites to crime, or disturbs the public order," and Article 7 which guarantees that "freedom of writing and publishing writings on any subject is inviolable. No law or authority may establish censorship, require bonds from authors or printers, or restrict the freedom of printing, which shall be limited only by the respect due to private life, morals, and public peace." Mexico is currently a signatory to the International Covenant on Civil and Political Rights which gives them the responsibility to uphold these established laws regarding freedom of expression.

Government corruption found within Mexico has been linked with the killing of journalists. Many deaths since the beginning of the Mexican Drug War have been linked to drug cartels and government officials connected to cartels since 2000. Different administrations have attempted different policies, but the issues of corruption have prevented widespread success of these policies. Mexico is consistently graded low in their corruption and safety for journalists. Transparency International gave Mexico a 31/100, ranking it at 126 out of 180 countries that were graded.

Mexico also prohibits cultural appropriation.

== Attacks and threats against journalists ==
The dangers posed to journalists in Mexico have been an ongoing issue since the Mexican Revolution, but in more recent times the crimes against journalists include attacks, kidnappings, being forced into exile and murder. In August 2016, Reporters Without Borders wrote that Veracruz was "one of the most dangerous states in Mexico for journalists," while also reporting that "176 cases of violence, intimidation, threats, aggression, cyber-attacks, blackmail, murder and enforced disappearance in which journalists were the victims from 2013 to June 2016."

The Mexican Drug War has been a major source of conflict between drug cartels, the government, and journalists in Mexico. Throughout the war, each administration differed in their approach to the war. Threats and attacks against journalists have, however, remained consistent. Enrique Peña Nieto’s administration focused on social and economic progress for citizens rather than using military force. However, success was limited due to issues with corruption within the government. Drug cartels exercise influence in many regions of Mexico. As a result, individuals with connections to the cartel have also been employed with the Mexican government. These individuals act in the interest of the cartel either for financial gain or to avoid danger. Government officials acting in the interests of the cartel have impeded the success of any administration’s policies, and Peña Nieto’s approach was no different.

Many of the threats journalists have faced stem from reporting on such government corruption. This issue has led to incidents occurring as recently as the López Obrador Administration. In August 2022, Fredíd Roman was murdered hours after posting an article. In his article, he discusses the Iguala mass kidnapping and the role that the Mexican government played in the disappearances. Such acts of violence have happened as a result of government corruption. Drug cartels will retaliate with violence against journalists who speak out. Speaking out against certain government officials or agencies has since caused retaliation from drug cartels as well.

The Organization of American States (OAS) claims to uphold the principles that believe “the murder, kidnapping, intimidation of and threats to social communicators, as well as the material destruction of communications media violates the fundamental rights of individuals and strongly restrict freedom of expression. It is the duty of the state to prevent and investigate such occurrences, to punish their perpetrators and to ensure that victims receive due compensation.”

=== Government Policy and Corruption ===
In a 2010 issue for the Committee to Protect Journalists, they describe the criminal justice system in Mexico as failing journalists from being unable to "successfully prosecute more than 90 percent of press-related crimes over the past decade."

The Mexican government established the Protection Mechanism for Human Rights Defenders and Journalists in 2012. The mechanism was designed to support journalists under threat and ensure their safety. However, it has been criticized for its lack of resources, slow response times, and failure to address the root causes of violence against journalists. In many cases, journalists who receive protection from the government are still exposed to danger because the cartels and corrupt officials are able to bypass the system or retaliate against journalists. Miroslava Breach, was a journalist who covered corruption and organized crime in the state of Chihuahua, was killed outside her residence. Investigations subsequently showed that the assassins received information from a local mayor.

=== International Perspectives ===
The Committee to Protect Journalists (CPJ), an international nonprofit organization that advocates for press freedom, has consistently reported on the limitations of this program, noting that many journalists who request protection continue to face violence, including murder. Local law enforcement throughout Mexico has also been linked with Mexican cartels and supporting their operations. Looking at the case of Lourdes Maldonado Lopez, a well-known investigator of political corruption, was shot outside her Tijuana home. She had openly raised concerns about her life during legal proceedings with a prior governor, illustrating the lack of protections even for people covered by government safety programs. Proving that Mexico has developed a double standard in which they are portraying as a responsible nation that has taken into account the right of freedom of the press when the nation is witnessing a completely different reality. Furthermore, the case of Fredíd Roman, a journalist who was killed outside of his home. This came shortly after he published an article highlighting a government official’s potential involvement in the disappearance of college students.

In Mexico, organized crime and government threats drive violence against journalists, which restricts press freedom and encourages self-censorship. Mexico is among the deadliest countries for media professionals, with 67 journalists slain in 2022 alone. This is indicative of a larger pattern of violence that compromises the efficacy of the government's protection mechanism for journalists and human rights defenders.

Mexico's position on global press freedom indices reflects the country’s challenges in protecting journalists. Reports from the Committee to Protect Journalists, Reporters Without Borders, and other organizations consistently rank Mexico as one of the most dangerous countries for journalists. In 2022, Mexico was ranked as the deadliest country for journalists in the Americas, surpassing conflict zones like Colombia and Honduras.

Mexico’s poor performance on these indices is a direct result of the combination of criminal violence, political corruption, and the lack of effective legal and institutional responses. In July 2023, Luis Martin Sanchez Iñiguez, a journalist for the daily La Jornada, was discovered dead in Nayarit. His coverage of organized crime and corruption in the area is connected to his death. Days before his death was discovered, he was kidnapped, which raises questions about the impunity of crimes against journalists.

== Internet censorship ==
Mexican law provides for freedom of speech and press, and the government generally respects these rights in practice. There are no government restrictions on access to the Internet or credible reports that the government monitors e-mail or Internet chat rooms. Individuals and groups can engage in the expression of views via the Internet, including by e-mail. The OpenNet Initiative (ONI) found no evidence of Internet filtering in 2011. Mexico was classified as "partly free" in the Freedom on the Net 2011 report from Freedom House.

Transnational Criminal Organizations (TCOs) exercise an increasing influence over media outlets and reporters, at times directly threatening individuals who published critical views of crime groups. As citizens increasingly use social media Web sites such as Twitter and Facebook to obtain and share drug-related news, violence against the users of these sites is rising dramatically. The threats and violence lead to self-censorship in many cases.

Two states introduced new restrictions on the use of social media. In August 2011 Veracruz officials arrested Gilberto Martinez Vera and Maria de Jesus Bravo Pagola for allegedly spreading rumors of violence on Twitter. They were released following protests from civil society groups, but the state created a new “public disturbance” offense for use in similar cases in the future. Similarly, the state of Tabasco outlawed telephone calls or social network postings that could provoke panic. Civil society groups feared that the laws could be used to curb freedom of expression online.

On September 24, 2011, police in Nuevo Laredo found the headless body of a female journalist who wrote on TCO activity on Primera Hora de Nuevo Laredo newspaper and as an online blogger under the pseudonym of “La Nena de Laredo” (translating to “Laredo Girl” or literally “The Girl From Laredo”). Two other Nuevo Laredo-based bloggers were allegedly tortured and killed by TCOs in September and November, again in retaliation for posting comments on the Internet about local drug cartels.

In May 2009, the Mexican Federal Electoral Institute (IFE), asked YouTube to remove a parody of Fidel Herrera, governor of the state of Veracruz. Negative advertising in political campaigns is prohibited by present law, although the video appears to be made by a regular citizen, which would make it legal. It was the first time a Mexican institution intervened directly with the Internet.

In 2014, the Mexican government proposed the new Telecommunication Law, which if approved would seriously cripple the right of users to have free uncensored internet in similar ways to the SOPA and ACTA laws. This initiative was received with public outrage.

On 19 June 2017, The New York Times, in conjunction with Carmen Aristegui and Televisa news reporter Carlos Loret de Mola, reported that the Mexican government had used the Pegasus spyware to surveil on targets such as reporters, human rights leaders and anti-corruption activists using text messages as lures. From 2011 to 2017, the Mexican government spent $80 million on spyware. Pegasus infiltrates a person's cell phone and reports on their messages, e-mails, contacts and calendars.

As of July 2017, Oxford Internet Institute's Computational Propaganda Research Project claimed Mexico's social media manipulation (Peñabots) to come directly from the Mexican government itself.

In 2026, President Claudia Sheinbaum signed a decree banning violent content from social networks in order to prevent it from being viewed by minors under the age of 18. In the same year, she introduced several copyright protection measures, including safeguards against piracy and the use of government images in deepfakes. The laws impose fines and penalties on both offenders and Internet service providers. Critics argued that the guidelines were vague and could be used to censor memes and criticism of the government, leading to their being dubbed the "Anti-Meme Law".

== History ==
The history of censorship in Mexico can be traced to the extension of inquisitorial practices from the Spanish Inquisition into Spain's New World territories in North, Central and South America. Censorship practices that had long been under the control of the Catholic Church were now under the discretion of a newly independent governments. They took actions through secular and legal channels rather than religious orthodoxy. Censorship in the 19th century occurred in many forms dissimilar to those that came before it and was dominated by the constant struggle between journalists and government officials as to what constituted free speech. Issues of a free press remained salient throughout the Mexican Revolution and the following post-revolutionary rise of communist expression in the arts and journalism. Although there are constitutional guarantees of freedom of expression, the reality is government control of media and continued silencing of journalists through violence and self-censorship due to intimidation. The current president, Andres Manuel Lopez Obrador, has called out critical journalists by name.

=== Censorship by the Inquisition ===
The Holy Office of the Inquisition established by decree of King Philip II in 1569 created a centralized institution in Mexico to ensure religious orthodoxy. Its powers included censorship of expressions counter to Catholic doctrine and practice. The function of the Holy Office in censorship continued from its establishment until the beginning of the 19th century. After Mexico gained its independence from Spain in 1821 and dissolved the Inquisition (formally in 1812 but effectively by 1820) censorship changed in Mexico.

Although there was no separate Office of the Inquisition in New Spain until 1569, many practices of the Spanish Inquisition reached Mexico with the arrival of friars seeking to convert indigenous populations to Christianity and extirpate native religions. Censorship prior to the establishment of the Holy Office of the Mexican Inquisition was in many ways similar to that which came after. Leaders of both periods maintained the aim of silencing individuals who spoke out against the Catholic Church or its practices and made their mission the institution of uniform spiritual and social order. Unique to this early period were censorship efforts that focused more directly on countering the heretical speech of groups that would later fall outside the jurisdiction of the Holy Office upon its codification in the 1570s. Such groups included non-Catholic or recently converted indigenous Mexicans who were disproportionately accused of idolatry and blasphemy.

Prior to the creation of a formal tribunal, Inquisitional efforts were carried out by mendicants in monastic trials (1522-1534) and then by bishops who served as ecclesiastic judges (1535-1571). These early monastic inquisitors focused their attention disproportionately on indigenous cases of idolatry and blasphemy and modeled their investigations and trials on informal structures they had assumed from medieval tradition. They concerned themselves with investigating claims made against individuals and punished those who they found to uphold religious and spiritual values contrary to Catholic tradition. Although this monastic form of inquisition was replaced with the ecclesiastic form in central Mexico following the arrival of Bishops in New Spain in 1536, monastics in peripheral settlements continued to exercise intense persecution of natives who did not live up to their expectations as converted Catholics for at least the following three decades. Fray Diego de Landa used torture as late as 1562 in his Inquisitorial procedures against indigenous Mexicans in the province of Yucatán and infamously burned Maya codices (bark paper books) containing pre-Columbian hieroglyphic writings in an attempt to eliminate indigenous access to non-Catholic spiritual guidance and rituals. However, highly visible forms of censorship such as Landa's public destruction of indigenous codices occurred inconsistently and represent just part of the many smaller incidents of censorship that worked to systematically obscure ideas the Spanish believed were dangerous and subversive to upholding the Catholic faith and social order of colonial Mexico. Smaller instances of idolatry that did not find themselves at the center of public burnings constituted the bulk of early censorship efforts against indigenous people and the zeal with which the Spanish pursued non-Christian idols were rooted in their concern of exerting social order over an unfamiliar religion they did understand.

The bishop led ecclesiastic Inquisition that followed this early monastic period was similarly active in its prosecution of the recently converted indigenous people of Mexico. Although these bishops led Inquisitions did not prosecute a large number of indigenous Mexicans before formal tribunals, they did often extend their trials further than colonial oversight in Spain would have preferred. The first Bishop of Mexico Fray Juan de Zumárraga (1536-1546) tried 156 cases before the ecclesiastic Inquisition and, although defendants included Spaniards, mixed caste persons and a high number of those suspected to be illegally practicing the Jewish faith, it was Zumárraga's trials against indigenous Mexicans that proved to be his most controversial. In his most recognized trial Zumárraga brought cacique of Texcoco, Don Carlos Chichimecatecolt before his ecclesiastical Inquisition and tried him as a "dogmatizer against the faith". Despite the Bishop being unable to solicit a testimony that Don Carlos had explicitly practiced the more grave offence of idolatry and idol possession, he was executed for speaking out against the Church. Although he was reprimanded by inquisitors in Spain for his actions, Zumárraga and the bishop inquisitors of this period dealt out harsh punishments to indigenous peoples for simply speaking out against the Church. Both Spanish officials and colonists would come to view this intensive force as a shortcoming of the central direction of the New World Inquisition in the following years. In fact, it was this extreme treatment of indigenous people and dissenters of the Church that would lead to the formal establishment of the Holy Office in Central America in 1571, after the decree of Phillip II in 1569. By the end of this period a strong precedent was set as to what could and could not be said in colonial Mexico and what objects one could and could not possess.

==== Censorship of Books 1569-1820 ====
The Holy Office of the Inquisition was formally extended to the Americas by decree in 1569. However, although the Office now practiced censorship under specific guidelines, such censorship was not always consistent in its enforcement or standards throughout the Mexican Inquisition. Similar to the preceding period, the censorship efforts undertaken by the Holy Office varied by location, time, and provincial discretion. In general the tribunal of the Mexican Inquisition operated under the same procedural guidelines as the civil criminal trials of the day. The main differences being the religious nature of the investigations and the fact that the inquisitor, who served as the judge in the final trial, was also the one who would initially gather evidence against the subject. It remained controversial for people to speak out against the Church and as a result suspected heretics could be brought before the tribunal if they aroused the suspicion of their neighbors, friends or Holy Office Officials. The aim of these trials was to silence dissenters and eliminate visible opposition to the Church and Crown with the ultimate hope of bringing them back into alignment with Church doctrine. The means by which this was achieved was the imprisonment, torture and finally public ridicule faced in the Auto-da-fé (a public display of humiliation or punishment for those proven guilty before the tribunal) of those convicted before the Holy Office.

One of the most explicit forms of censorship that the Holy Office introduced was the Index. The Index of Prohibited Books, which was a list of prohibited reading materials given to the people of New Spain in 1573 and enforced through the Holy Office, became one of the chief means through which censorship in colonial Mexico was attained and one of the most intensive measures taken by New World inquisitors to suppress information. Book censorship was one of the most consistent methods of censorship and remained a prominent measure taken by the Office even as other priorities shifted. Although enforcement of the Index by the Holy Office varied from location to location, even distant tribunals of the Inquisition such as the one in New Spain had the authority to expurgate, prohibit, or remove from circulation any work it found offensive on its own volition. Anyone found in possession of prohibited materials could be investigated by the Mexican Inquisition and subject to imprisonment and subsequent trial. For example, in a 1655 investigation of the private library of colonial Mexican architect Melchor Perez de Soto, the Holy Office confiscated 1,592 books and permanently impounded many that did not even appear on the Index because they were written in Flemish and could not be formally reviewed by the local Inquisition. In instances such as this, the Mexican Inquisition had full discretion over what it would and would not allow under its jurisdiction and the boundaries of its own localized censorship gave it rather complete control over the intellectual life of its subjects. The Index also gave the Inquisition oversight of all shipments into and out of colonial Mexico. Inquisitors had the right to search all cargo of a ship arriving from Europe in a process called visitation and the authority to confiscate anything they found offensive. While this process was mainly intended to find prohibited print material it was not limited to such items. It is likely that many of these searches were not thorough enough to catch all prohibited materials and depending on the port of entry visitations were sometimes incredibly lax.

Aside from book censorship the Holy Office was also responsible for censoring countless other forms of written and crafted materials that were found to be offensive to the church. After the great auto-de-fé of 1649, an event that found 109 people guilty under the tribunal's codes (13 of which were put to death), the focus of the Inquisition in Mexico shifted from spectacle punishments to more mundane enforcement of smaller offences. This included an increased vigilance of inquisitors over newly printed materials like pamphlets and plays. Anything from dramatic scripts to Protestant icons that made their way across the ocean and arrived in Mexican ports became subject to searches similar to those of illicit books banned on the Index. The state of censorship in Mexico trended this way through much of the 17th and 18th century, going through phases of more intense and lax enforcement depending on when and where the censorship was occurring but largely focusing its attention on lesser offences than it had in the 16th and early 17th century. By the end of the colonial period the Holy Office increasingly became a tool of political ends and officials or prominent community members often used the tribunal as a means of silencing opponents through the wide scope of religious crimes they could accuse their foes of.

=== Censorship in post-independence 19th-century Mexico ===
At the start of the 19th century censorship efforts were still legally bound to the Holy Office and the Mexican Inquisition carried out its duties much like it had at the close of the preceding century. However, in the years following 1812 the channels through which censorship operated changed rather quickly and by the time Mexico gained its independence in 1821 censorship had begun to be redefined through various secular mechanisms, mainly the press. This process of managing censorship through the press began to take shape around the turn of the first decade. It was catalyzed by the Spanish Cortes' abolition of its old codes of censorship in favor of speech through article 371 of the 1812 Spanish Constitution of Cadiz. The Constitution's liberal changes quickly made their way to Mexico but were not initially influential due to colonial officials' present concern over the insurgencies of Miguel Hidalgo and other revolutionaries. As a result, much of press and speech continued to be censored on the same religious and moral grounds they had been in preceding decades. Despite the apathy of colonial officials to consider a truly free press and the repeal of the 1812 Spanish Constitution in Spain in 1814, much of the 1812 Constitution's language and content, including its liberal conception of a free press, would find itself worked into the 1824 Constitution of Mexico and continue to influence the nature of Mexican censorship well after the nation's independence in 1821.

However, the rather liberal and unrestricted sentiments pertaining to the press found in the 1824 Constitution would be modified soon after their implementation and it was not until the 1828 reform of the Constitution that press censorship began to resemble the form it would take for the rest of the 19th century. The most fundamental of these changes was the redesign of the press jury. The press jury in 19th century Mexico was a jury of citizens that would assemble to hear complaints issued against publications and then deliberate over whether they were subversive, immoral, or slanderous. Although jury size fluctuated throughout the time the press jury was in use, its redesign in 1828 required 9 press jury members to deem a work subversive, immoral, or slanderous in order to bring the case before a lower criminal court, creating a buffer between defendant and prosecution that had not existed during the Mexican Inquisition. The press jury would find itself in a tenuous position soon after its new codes went into effect when in 1829 President Vicente Guerrero gave the state the power to punish journalists without the use of a jury and then again in 1831 when the subsequent conservative government of Anastasio Bustamante placed all crimes of the press under the direct discretion of judges. Further, in 1839 then interim president Antonio Lopez de Santa Anna issued a proclamation that allowed his government to pursue and apprehend authors whose works it deemed salacious, investing itself with the power to imprison journalists without the use of a jury. Although this proclamation was repealed only three weeks after it was issued, the punishments brought against journalists who deviated from safe topics during this time often included significant prison time. The culture of repression surrounding decrees like Santa Anna's were pervasive enough to keep writers from signing their work out of fear of being investigated: a problem that became so widespread that in 1855 President Ignacio Comonfort made it illegal to publish anonymously. Ultimately, these initial backlashes were not the end of the press jury which found itself fall in and out of favor with the various governments of the time; they do, however, mark a trend of government mandated censorship in the early to mid 19th century that was characterized by rapid changes and inconsistent standards as to what constituted a free press.

The 1857 Constitution signified a turning point for government censorship of expression and ushered in a more liberal conception of free speech than had existed in the first half of the 19th century. Building off the Constitution of 1824, Articles 6 and 7 of the new Constitution guaranteed freedom of speech and the unrestricted expression of ideas. However, it was not until after the War of the Reform ended in 1861, and the Law of 2 February 1861 was enacted to regulate article 7 of the Constitution, that the press juries operation was laid out in clearer terms and re-instituted as a means of press regulation. The press juries consistent use would be delayed until the French Occupation of Mexico ceased, and the Law of 2 February was successfully implemented through an identical text in the 1868 modification to the Constitution. This allowed freedom of the press and press juries to continue to operate with relatively few interruptions until 1882. The rise of Porfirio Díaz in the late 1870s and his subsequent seven terms as president would see freedom of the press and speech censored mainly through threats of violence directed at newspapers and reporters. In the closing years of the 19th century censorship was once again implemented through the press and the changes Porfirio and his government's made would continue to define freedom of speech and expression in Mexico into the revolution of the 20th century.

=== Censorship in the 20th century ===
Censorship in Mexico during the 20th century was shaped by a combination of authoritarian practices, political control over media, and efforts to suppress dissents. Most of the century was ruled by the Institutional Revolutionary Party (PRI), applying self-censorship, including co-opting journalists and mass media.

In 1968, under the administration of Gustavo Díaz Ordaz, the Mexican government carried out the Tlatelolco massacre, in which students from the Mexican Student Movement were killed. The government heavily distorted and censored the event. In 1976, president Luis Echeverría encouraged a coup within the newspaper Excélsior, leading to the ousting of editor Julio Scherer and his team, who subsequently founded the independent magazine Proceso. Echeverría's successor, José López Portillo, is remembered for the phrase "no pago para que me peguen" ("I'm not paying them to attack me" or "I don't pay to be criticized"), which he used as a public complaint against the print media—especially those that received government funding through official advertising but continued to criticize his administration.

As Mexico faced economic crises and increasing democratization pressures in the 1980s and 1990s, media began gaining more space to criticize the government. However, Miguel de la Madrid responded by pulling advertisements from El Financiero due to its coverage of debt agreement negotiations. Meanwhile, Carlos Salinas de Gortari allowed only one journalist to accompany him and report on his activities.

=== Censorship in the 21st century ===
In 2000, the PRI party lost its first general election since its inception. President Vicente Fox established in 2002 the autonomous agency National Institute of Transparency for Access to Information and Personal Data Protection (INAI) to facilitate access to public information from governmental agencies and departments. However, Proceso reported that Fox was repeating the practices of his predecessors concerning government-sponsored content in the media, a trend his successor, Felipe Calderón, would continue. During the presidency of Enrique Peña Nieto, there was an attempt to approve a law that would censor the internet, block applications, and cancel services by order of an authority, but it was rejected following widespread protests.

==== Under the Fourth Transformation (2018–present) ====
In 2018, President Andrés Manuel López Obrador, who was the leader of the opposition for 18 years, instaured morning press briefings colloquially known as La mañanera. He stated that the press could ask any questions of the government, emphasizing that "there are no limits, no censorship... The media are instruments to keep the people informed". In these sessions, he frequently delivered lengthy speeches, attacking his critics and political adversaries rather than responding directly to reporters' questions about national matters. Journalists consider that López Obrador used this approach to control or influence the narrative by silencing dissents. For instance, he condemned and marginalized media outlets that do not aligned with his views, creating an environment where some reporters or outlets may feel pressured to tone down their criticism. During these sessions, López Obrador also disclosed non-public information about journalists such as Natalie Kitroeff, bureau chief of The New York Times in Mexico, or Carlos Loret de Mola, a contributor to El Universal and LatinUS, which is prohibited by law. López Obrador argued that journalists should be considered civil servants, as media outlets are "public-interest entities". During his term, the use of co-opted influencers increased to portray a positive image of the presidency on social networks while condemning traditional media. By the end of his presidency, López Obrador halted the operations of the INAI, criticizing the organization for its cost and questioning its effectiveness. He replaced it with a government ministry, Secretariat of Anticorruption and Good Governance, responsible for overseeing transparency activities within the government.

In April 2025, President Claudia Sheinbaum submitted a proposal to the joint commissions of Radio, Television, and Cinematography; Communications and Transportation; and Legislative Studies of the Senate to amend the law in order to prevent foreign political propaganda. This move came in response to a legal loophole that allowed a spot published by the U.S. presidency under Donald Trump, where Kristi Noem, the Secretary of Homeland Security, warned immigrants that they would be "hunted down" and deported if they entered the United States to be broadcast in public television. The government perceived the spot as discriminatory. The proposal was approved by the commissions, and one of the articles grants the Agencia de Transformación Digital y Telecomunicaciones, a government-operated agency, the authority to block any digital platforms, websites or social networks. Senator of the opposition, Manuel Añorve Baños, explained that the government could "block and censor digital platforms, social networks, websites, and applications without the need for a court order, without judicial mandate, without a time limit, and without checks and balances or clear procedures".

During her administration, several states approved legislation imposing penalties, ranging from fines to prison sentences, on individuals who criticized politicians, under the pretext of combating cyberbullying and harassment. Additionally, the concept of gender-based political violence, though intended to protect women from hegemonic masculinity and systematic machismo, was at times used to silence criticism, particularly of female politicians, due to the law's vague language, which enabled complaints based on sexist comments or against journalists investigating alleged corruption. The government of Sheinbaum downplayed the critics, asserting that laws would not be used for censorship purposes and that she opposed any suppression of free expression.

The Committee to Protect Journalists noted that vexatious litigation by politicians against journalists increased following a 2016 resolution, drawing comparisons to strategic lawsuits against public participation (SLAPP suits) in the United States and the European Union. Between 2020 and mid-2025, 158 journalists faced libel lawsuits, including 69 cases filed in 2025 alone. In early 2026, the Inter American Press Association classified Mexico as having a "high restriction" level of freedom of expression, the country's lowest rating since the index was introduced.

In late July 2026, the Sheinbaum administration presented a law proposal under which media outlets would "self-regulate" their news coverage by introducing an ethics code and appointing defensores de las audiencias ("audience ombudspeople"). These ombudspeople would receive complaints from members of the public who believed a news report was false, incomplete, outdated or presented as recent, lacked context, was biased, was unmarked sponsored content, or was an opinion. If the ombudspeople found a complaint to be valid, they could request that the media outlet issue a correction or face administrative fines.

The proposal was criticized by several media organizations, commentators, and opposition politicians, who argued that it would encourage self-censorship and effectively create a system of pro-government censors. Sheinbaum rejected those accusations, arguing that each media outlet would appoint its own ethics code and audience ombudsperson, provided the appointee met the legal requirements. Mary Anastasia O'Grady wrote for The Wall Street Journal that the move aimed to cause self-censorship by media companies, and the proposal was part of the autocratization lived during the Morena period.

== See also ==
- List of journalists and media workers killed in Mexico

== Bibliography ==
- Aalbers, Geert, and Nick Panes. "Mexico, the Next Brazil?" Foreign Affairs. October 7, 2015. https://www.foreignaffairs.com/articles/mexico/2015-10-07/mexico-next-brazil.
- "Constitution of Mexico - OAS." Accessed November 16, 2016. http://www.oas.org/Juridico/MLA/en/mex/en_mex-int-text-const.pdf.
- "Disastrous Toll – 21 Latin American Journalists Killed in past Six Months | Reporters without Borders." Reporters Without Borders. July 5, 2016. Accessed November 16, 2016. https://rsf.org/en/news/disastrous-toll-21-latin-american-journalists-killed-past-six-months.
- Green, Jonathon. "Mexico." In The Encyclopedia of Censorship, 348–50. New York, NY: Facts on File, 1990.
- "Mexico: Threats against Author of Book about Veracruz Governor | Reporters without Borders." Reporters Without Borders. August 11, 2016. Accessed November 16, 2016. https://rsf.org/en/news/mexico-threats-against-author-book-about-veracruz-governor.
- "Mexico: Two Mexican Journalists Murdered in Space of Three Days | Reporters without Borders." Reporters Without Borders. September 20, 2016. Accessed November 16, 2016. https://rsf.org/en/news/mexico-two-mexican-journalists-murdered-space-three-days.
- "Mexico : Violence and Impunity." Reporters Without Borders. Accessed November 16, 2016. https://rsf.org/en/mexico.
- Relly, Jeannine E.; González de Bustamante, Celeste (January 2014). "Silencing Mexico: A Study of Influences on Journalists in the Northern States". The International Journal of Press/Politics. 19 (1): 108–131. doi:10.1177/1940161213509285. S2CID 145457808.
- "Reporter Gunned down in Veracruz While under State Protection | Reporters without Borders." Reporters Without Borders. July 22, 2016. Accessed November 16, 2016. https://rsf.org/en/news/reporter-gunned-down-veracruz-while-under-state-protection.
- Simon, Joel. "ONE Informing the Global Citizen." In The New Censorship: Inside the Global Battle for Media Freedom, 11–31. Columbia University Press, 2015.
- Simon, Joel. "Silence or Death in Mexico's Press." Committee to Protect Journalists. 2010. https://cpj.org/reports/cpj_mexico_english.pdf
