= Internet in Mexico =

Mexico Internet service

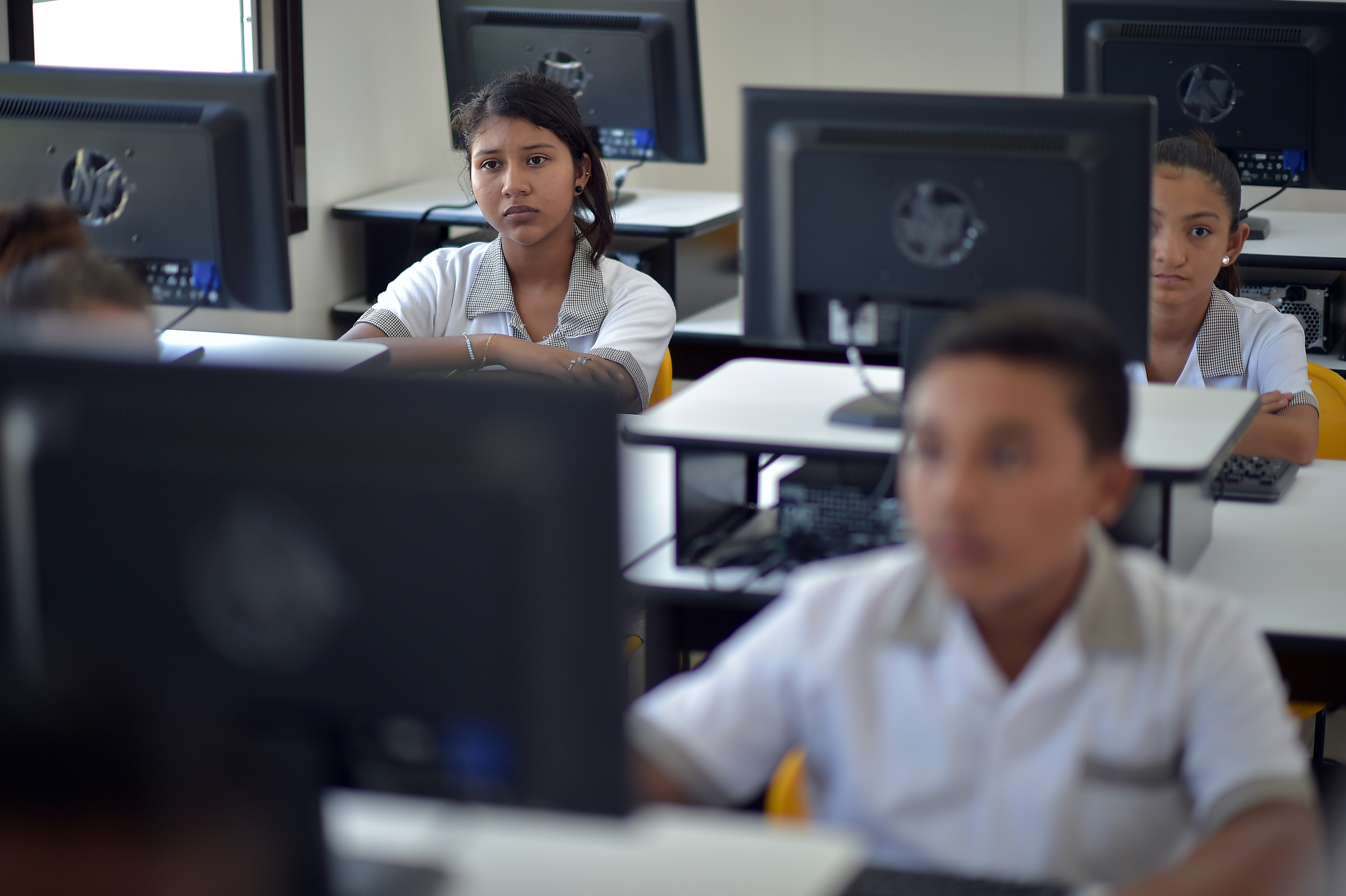
Students of a Mexican secondary school using the internet.

As of 2023 Mexico has approximately 97 million Internet users representing 70.1% of the population. The country ranks 8 in number of Internet users in the world. Mexico is the country with the most Internet users among Spanish speaking countries and is currently experiencing a huge surge in demand for broadband Internet services. In August 2005, Cisco Systems, said they see Mexico and countries in Latin America as the focal point for growth in coming years. With Mexico being identified as a hypergrowth market for equipment suppliers and receiving the biggest chunk of Cisco's investments. Additionally looking at the historical growth for the period from 2001 to 2005 we see broadband Internet jump from 0.1 subscribers per hundred population to 2.2 subscribers per hundred population, a growth of 2100% in just five years.

Telmex is the largest provider of (A)DSL connection. After being converted from a state monopoly to a private enterprise by President Carlos Salinas de Gortari in 1990, it took the Mexican Government 5 years to establish regulations in the Telecommunications Act and only then were competitors allowed to enter the Mexican telecommunication market, leaving Telmex' and its owner Carlos Slim enough time to extend their technological lead. Nevertheless, Mexico is lagging behind the world average in connection speeds.

Mexico is one of the few Latin American countries that has little or no Internet censorship. However, increasing threats and violence against media outlets, reporters, and bloggers related to drugs and drug trafficking leads to self-censorship by the press and by individuals.

== Broadband ISPs ==
Broadband Growth Historical (subscribers per hundred population)
2001	2002	2003	2004	2005
0.1	0.3	0.4	0.9	2.2

=== xDSL ===
ISPs that provide xDSL:

- Telmex started selling ISDN connections under the Prodigy Turbo brand name in the mid '90s. The service was then replaced for a few years with xDSL connections sold under the Prodigy Infinitum brand name. XDSL is now being offered under the Telmex brand name directly.

Telmex Packages (Through a commercial line)
Name	Downstream	Upstream	Price (MXN)	Price (USD)
Infinitum Negocio	2 Mbit/s	512kbit/s	404	(~24)
Infinitum Negocio Red	4 Mbit/s	640kbit/s	706	(~55)
Infinitum Negocio Premium	6 Mbit/s	768kbit/s	1,209	(~73)

Telmex Packages (Through a residential line) ^{_{Including other phone services}}
Name	Downstream	Upstream	Price (MXN)	Price (USD)
Paquete 289	5 Mbit/s	512 kbit/s	289	(~13)
Paquete 389	20 Mbit/s	5 Mbit/s	389	(~17)
Paquete 435	30 Mbit/s	10 Mbit/s	435	(~26)
Paquete 499	40 Mbit/s	10 Mbit/s	499	(~30)
Paquete 599	150 Mbit/s	50 Mbit/s	599	(~36)
Paquete 999	300 Mbit/s	100 Mbit/s	999	(~60)

- Terra, Also provided by Telmex under Terra brand.
- Alestra
- Maxcom

=== Cable ===
- Izzi Telecom

Cablevisión Packages
Package	Speed	Price (MXN)	Price (USD)
Yoo Basico 2.0	6 Mbit/s	519	(~31)
Yoo Mas	10 Mbit/s	669	(~40)
Yoo Mas HD	12 Mbit/s	759	(~46)
Yoo Total HD	30 Mbit/s	999	(~60)
Yoo Premiere HD	50 Mbit/s	1399	(~84)

Packages include TV, Telephone and Internet services.

Megacable Residential Packages
Speed	Price (MXN)	Price (USD)
3 Mbit/s	199	(~12)
4 Mbit/s	299	(~18)
10 Mbit/s	399	(~24)
20 Mbit/s	699	(~54)

Cybercable Residential Packages
Downstream	Upstream	Price (MXN)	Price (USD)
1 Mbit/s	500 kbit/s	150	(~9)
2 Mbit/s	800 kbit/s	200	(~12)
3 Mbit/s	1100 kbit/s	251	(~15)
4 Mbit/s	1500 kbit/s	301	(~18)
5 Mbit/s	1800 kbit/s	352	(~21)
6 Mbit/s	2000 kbit/s	402	(~31)
7 Mbit/s	2000 kbit/s	452	(~35)
8 Mbit/s	2000 kbit/s	503	(~39)

=== FTTH ===
Recently there's been a big push towards fiber in the 3 big cities in Mexico (Mexico City, Guadalajara & Monterrey) and they offer up to 100 Mbit/s links, both synchronous and asynchronous. These services are being provided by:

- Axtel
- Iusacell
- Telmex
- TotalPlay

It is notable that not all providers offer all connection options to all customers. TotalPlay, for example, limits upload speeds to 10% of the purchased download speed (for residential customers, as of April 2020). While any discussion of upload speed is assiduously avoided on their website, this can be confirmed by calling their sales team directly. This is also mentioned on their Wikipedia page: TotalPlay Internet (Spanish).

=== WiMax ===
ISPs that provide Wimax Technology:

- AXTEL (ISP) - AXTEL started selling Wimax connections at the beginning of 2008. The service has been rebranded and named Acceso Universal.

Acceso Universal Packages (Internet connection plus a residential line)
Name	Downstream	Local Calls	Long Distance Mex, USA & Canada	Price (MXN)	Price (USD)
Acceso Universal 1	512 kbit/s	Unlimited	None	309	(~22)
Acceso Universal 2	1 Mbit/s	Unlimited	None	349	(~25)
Acceso Universal 3	2 Mbit/s	Unlimited	None	469	(~33)

Acceso Universal Packages (Internet connection plus a commercial line)
Name	Downstream	Local Calls	Long Distance Mex, USA & Canada	Price (MXN)	Price (USD)
Acceso Universal 1	1 Mbit/s	150	None	449	(~32)
Acceso Universal 2	1 Mbit/s	Unlimited	None	599	(~43)
Acceso Universal 3	2 Mbit/s	200	None	579	(~41)
Acceso Universal 4	2 Mbit/s	Unlimited	None	729	(~52)

=== Wireless (non-cellular) ===
- E-Go (MMDS) provided service in Monterrey, Guadalajara, Toluca & Mexico City, until the Secretaria de Telecomunicaciones y Transportes revoked its license to operate the 2.5 GHz spectrum
- SupernetMX provided service in Chetumal, Bacalar, Calderitas, Huay pix and Xul Ha. Their website does not resolve to any server, and apparently the company no longer exists.
- Ultranet2Go (WiMax) provides service in Puebla, Tamaulipas, Veracruz and Aguascalientes, with plans ranging from $249 to $999 pesos

=== Wireless (cellular) ===
There are three network operator:

- Telcel (HSDPA+ / HSPA+ / 4G / LTE / 4.5G / 5G)
- AT&T Mexico (Hybrid CDMA/GSM HSDPA-HSPA+ network / 4G / LTE / 4.5G)
- Movistar (GPRS/EDGE/3G-HSDPA+)

and several MVNOs such as Virgin Mobile, Cierto, weex, Aló, Flash Mobile, Oui Movil, Maz Tiempo and QUBocel.

== Internet censorship ==
Mexican law provides for freedom of speech and press, and the government generally respects these rights in practice. There are no government restrictions on access to the Internet or credible reports that the government monitors e-mail or Internet chat rooms. Individuals and groups can engage in the expression of views via the Internet, including by e-mail. The OpenNet Initiative (ONI) found no evidence of Internet filtering in 2011. Mexico was classified as "partly free" in the Freedom on the Net 2011 report from Freedom House.

Transnational Criminal Organizations (TCOs) exercise an increasing influence over media outlets and reporters, at times directly threatening individuals who published critical views of crime groups. As citizens increasingly use social media Web sites such as Twitter and Facebook to obtain and share drug-related news, violence against the users of these sites is rising dramatically. The threats and violence lead to self-censorship in many cases.

Two states introduced new restrictions on the use of social media. In August 2011 Veracruz officials arrested Gilberto Martinez Vera and Maria de Jesus Bravo Pagola for allegedly spreading rumors of violence on Twitter. They were released following protests from civil society groups, but the state created a new “public disturbance” offense for use in similar cases in the future. Similarly, the state of Tabasco outlawed telephone calls or social network postings that could provoke panic. Civil society groups feared that the laws could be used to curb freedom of expression online.

On September 24, 2011, police in Nuevo Laredo found the headless body of a female journalist who wrote on TCO activity on Primera Hora de Nuevo Laredo newspaper and as an online blogger under the pseudonym of “La Nena de Laredo” (translating to “Laredo Girl” or literally “The Girl From Laredo”). Two other Nuevo Laredo-based bloggers were allegedly tortured and killed by TCOs in September and November, again in retaliation for posting comments on the Internet about local drug cartels.

In May 2009, the Mexican Federal Electoral Institute (IFE), asked YouTube to remove a parody of Fidel Herrera, governor of the state of Veracruz. Negative advertising in political campaigns is prohibited by present law, although the video appears to be made by a regular citizen, which would make it legal. It was the first time a Mexican institution intervened directly with the Internet.

In 2014, the Mexican government proposed the new Telecommunication Law, which if approved would seriously cripple the right of users to have free uncensored internet in similar ways to the SOPA and ACTA laws. This initiative was received with public outrage.

On 19 June 2017, The New York Times, in conjunction with Carmen Aristegui and Televisa news reporter Carlos Loret de Mola, reported that the Mexican government had used the Pegasus spyware to surveil on targets such as reporters, human rights leaders and anti-corruption activists using text messages as lures. From 2011 to 2017, the Mexican government spent $80 million on spyware. Pegasus infiltrates a person's cell phone and reports on their messages, e-mails, contacts and calendars.

As of July 2017, Oxford Internet Institute's Computational Propaganda Research Project claimed Mexico's social media manipulation (Peñabots) to come directly from the Mexican government itself.

In 2026, President Claudia Sheinbaum signed a decree banning violent content from social networks in order to prevent it from being viewed by minors under the age of 18. In the same year, she introduced several copyright protection measures, including safeguards against piracy and the use of government images in deepfakes. The laws impose fines and penalties on both offenders and Internet service providers. Critics argued that the guidelines were vague and could be used to censor memes and criticism of the government, leading to their being dubbed the "Anti-Meme Law".
