= International Panel on the Information Environment =

International non-profit organization

- Abbreviation: IPIE
- Established: December 2023 (3 years ago)
- Types: Scientific body, non-governmental organization
- Headquarters: Zurich, Switzerland
- Website: www.ipie.info

The International Panel on the Information Environment (IPIE) is an international science body of over 500 experts from 75 countries dedicated to providing actionable scientific knowledge on threats to the global information environment. The organization has been compared with the Intergovernmental Panel on Climate Change, but also the European Organization for Nuclear Research (CERN) and the International Atomic Energy Agency, because it uses the model of scientific panels and neutral assessments to identify points of consensus or gaps in knowledge. The IPIE was legally registered as a charitable entity in the Canton of Zurich, Switzerland in 2023.

== Panels ==
The first panel was a Scientific Panel on Global Standards on AI Auditing, chaired by Professor Wendy Chun; science and technology policy expert Professor Alondra Nelson served as a member of the panel. At the UN Summit of the Future in September 2024 the IPIE announced the formation of a Scientific Panel on Information Integrity about Climate Science, a Scientific Panel on Child Protection and Social Media, and a Scientific Panel on AI and Peacebuilding. Currently, the IPIE also runs a Scientific Panel on AI and Economic Inclusion.

== Origins ==
The concept was proposed in 2021 during the first Nobel Prize Summit organized by the US National Academy of Sciences and the Nobel Foundation, involving Dr. Sheldon Himelfarb, then head of PeaceTech Lab, and Professor Philip N Howard, a Professor at Oxford University and then Director of the Oxford Internet Institute, In September 2022 thirty scientists met at Oxford University to develop a mission statement, organizational structure, and process for developing scientific consensus. This chartering group included researchers from the social, behavioral and computer sciences. Over time, similar calls to create this independent body have come from public science agencies, civil society, philanthropy, and the technology firms themselves. Some proposals focused exclusively on AI, others on a host of technology-related harms, but there has been strong consensus that the body would need financial independence from technology firms and governments, would not be credibly managed by a steering committee of nation states, and would function better as an independent science body. A larger group of scientists convened in Costa Rica in February 2023 to continue planning, with subsequent meetings in Miami, Lagos, and Zurich.

In May 2023 the IPIE was publicly launched during the Nobel Prize Summit in Washington DC. The Panel's inaugural announcement said,

Algorithmic bias, manipulation and misinformation has become a global and existential threat that exacerbates existing social problems, degrades public life, cripples humanitarian initiatives and prevents progress on other serious threats.

A New York Times report on the Panel's launch described its initial plans to "issue regular reports, not fact-checking individual falsehoods but rather looking for deeper forces behind the spread of disinformation as a way to guide government policy."

== Management ==
The IPIE is currently led by Oxford University Professor Philip N. Howard, who serves a President, and Professor Sebastian Valenzuela from the Catholic University of Chile, who serves as Chief Science Officer. The IPIE Secretariat includes 10 staff based out of Zurich. The organization is governed by a small Board of Trustees, a system of permanent methodology, ethics and membership committees, and limited-term scientific panels on particular topics. The Board of Trustees includes Dame Inga Beale, Susan Doniz, Dr. Sheldon Himelfarb, Reto Jauch, Sir Julian King, John Momoh, and Howard Rosen.

The organization is neutral and nonpartisan, but does seek better access to data from technology companies so as to better appraise the impact of new technologies like AI on public life. Although often called the "CERN for AI" or "IPCC for AI", the group of scientists founding the body wanted to emphasize its independence as a trusted advisor, and did not want to be governed by member states or have direct industry ties.

== Impact ==
In 2024 the Scientific Panel on Information Integrity about Climate Science published a global assessment of risks driving attention to the issue and motivating COP to add information integrity to the agenda in Brazil. The IPIE helped found a consortium of member states, led by Brazil and managed by UNESCO, now called the Global Initiative for Information Integrity about Climate. The organization has published major global assessments on the impact of AI on election integrity. In 2025, the IPIE published a global assessment of the impact of AI in 50 elections around the world. Each year, the organization presents the results of its global expert survey during the UN General Assembly meetings. At the 2026 briefing at UN headquarters, it was reported that three quarters of the experts surveyed expected the global information environment to degrade in the year ahead.
