= Janet Ajzenstat =

Canadian political scientist (1936–2025)

- Born: Janet Leslie MacDonald; 19 April 1936
- Died: 27 May 2025 (aged 89); Hamilton, Ontario, Canada
- Spouse: Samuel Ajzenstat (m. 1959; died 2013)
- Children: Oona Eisenstadt
- Relatives: Kady MacDonald Denton (sister)

Academic background
- Education: University College, Toronto; McMaster University
- Thesis: The Political Thought of Lord Durham (1979)
- Doctoral advisor: Peter H. Russell
- Influences: Allan Bloom

Academic work
- Discipline: Political science
- Institutions: McMaster University
- Notable works: The Political Thought of Lord Durham
- Website: janetajzenstat.wordpress.com

Janet Leslie Ajzenstat (née MacDonald; 19 April 1936 – 27 May 2025) was a Canadian political scientist who was a professor of political science at McMaster University. The author of numerous works on Canadian political history, she is best known for The Political Thought of Lord Durham, where she argues that Durham's call for French-Canadian assimilation was consistent with liberal principles.

== Background ==
As an undergraduate at University College, University of Toronto, Ajzenstat majored in art and archeology. Following graduation in 1959, she worked at the Art Gallery of Ontario, only turning to political science in the mid-1960s.

In 1959, she married philosopher and future fellow McMaster professor Samuel Ajzenstat. Their daughter, Oona Eisenstadt, is a professor of Jewish studies at Pomona College. Their son, Sandor Ajzenstat, is an artist. Her sister is the children's book creator Kady MacDonald Denton.

Ajzenstat received her Doctor of Philosophy degree from the University of Toronto under the supervision of Peter H. Russell. While a doctoral student, she was a teaching assistant for Allan Bloom's introductory political philosophy course. Bloom was a major influence on her thought and she described him in her dissertation as a "mentor and friend".

Ajzenstat died on 27 May 2025, at the age of 89.

== Canadian federalism ==
Ajzenstat's view of Canadian federalism, which dismisses the idea of special status for Quebec or Indigenous people, provoked much scholarly debate, especially following the collapse of the Meech Lake Accord. A review of The Political Thought of Lord Durham described the book "as a bold revisionist analysis of Durham's political thought and as a clear defence of mainstream liberalism in the face of attempts to enshrine Quebec's 'distinctiveness' in Canadian federalism".

Ajzenstat also contends that so-called "judicial activism" undercuts the foundation of responsible government. For example, in Once and Future Canadian Democracy, she wrote about the Canadian Charter of Rights and Freedoms: "We forgot that parliaments have an interest in securing rights. We began to think of parliaments as tyrants, ever ready to trespass on the citizen’s liberties, to invade the sphere of private rights. And we began to think of the courts and the courts alone as guardians of our precious rights and liberties". As a result, her work is well received by conservative scholars, such as Stephen Harper's former chief of staff Ian Brodie and political scientist Barry Cooper; the latter wrote in a review of Canada's Founding Debates, "This is revisionist history at its best".

Ajzenstat's work was the subject of two chapters in Canadian Conservative Political Thought (2023), edited by Lee Trepanier and Richard Avramenko.

== Awards ==
Ajzenstat was a recipient of the Queen Elizabeth II Golden Jubilee Medal (2002), the John T. Saywell Prize for Canadian Constitutional Legal History (2009), and the Queen Elizabeth II Diamond Jubilee Medal (2012).

== Bibliography ==
=== Books ===
- Ajzenstat, Janet (1988). The Political Thought of Lord Durham. McGill-Queen's University Press.
- Ajzenstat, Janet; Romney, Paul; Gentles, Ian; Gairdner, William D., eds. (2003). Canada's Founding Debates. Toronto: University of Toronto Press. ISBN 978-0-8020-8607-5. OCLC 923080311.
- Ajzenstat, Janet (2003). The Once and Future Canadian Democracy: An Essay in Political Thought. McGill-Queen's University Press. ISBN 978-0-7735-2658-7.
- ——— (2007). The Canadian Founding: John Locke and Parliament. McGill-Queen's University Press. ISBN 978-0-7735-3152-9.
- ——— (November 2010). "Confederation and Individual Liberty" (PDF). Canada's Founding Ideas. The Macdonald-Laurier Institute for Public Policy.
- ——— (2014). Discovering Confederation: A Canadian's Story. McGill-Queen's University Press. doi:10.1515/9780773590250. ISBN 978-0-7735-9025-0.

=== Articles ===
- Ajzenstat, Janet (September 1981). "Liberalism and Political Thought". Canadian Journal of Political Science. 14 (3): 587–609. doi:10.1017/S0008423900047090. JSTOR 3230349.
- ——— (March 1985). "Modern Mixed Government: A Liberal Defence of Inequality". Canadian Journal of Political Science. 18 (1): 119–134. doi:10.1017/S0008423900029243. JSTOR 3227912.
- ——— (March 1990). "Canada's First Constitution: Pierre Bédard on Tolerance and Dissent". Canadian Journal of Political Science. 23 (1): 39–57. doi:10.1017/S0008423900011616. JSTOR 3228220.
- ——— (December 1997). "Reconciling Parliament and Rights: A. V. Dicey Reads the Canadian Charter of Rights and Freedoms". Canadian Journal of Political Science. 30 (4): 645–662. doi:10.1017/S0008423900016462. JSTOR 3232251.
- ——— (Fall 2009). "Historians in Search of a Framework". The Underhill Review.

== See also ==
- Pearce, Colin D. (2023). "Global Nihilism, Liberal Relativism, and Tutorialist Statecraft: A Critique of Janet Ajzenstat's Canadian Political Philosophy". In Trepanier, Lee; Avramenko, Richard (eds.). Canadian Conservative Political Thought. Routledge. doi:10.4324/9781003367727-10. ISBN 978-1-003-36772-7.
- Smith, Travis D. (2023). "Ajzenstat versus the Oligarchs". In Trepanier, Lee; Avramenko, Richard (eds.). Canadian Conservative Political Thought. Routledge. pp. 139–155. doi:10.4324/9781003367727-11. ISBN 978-1-003-36772-7.
