= Philip N. Howard =

Canadian social scientist (born 1970)

- Born: December 9, 1970 (age 55); Montreal, Canada
- Occupations: Author; Administrator; University of Oxford Professor; President of the IPIE
- Known for: astroturfing; computational propaganda; politics and technology; political communication; network ethnography; bots

Academic background
- Education: University of Toronto, London School of Economics, Northwestern University

Academic work
- Discipline: Social Science
- Website: www.philhoward.org/

Philip N. Howard (born December 9, 1970) is a sociologist and communication researcher who studies the impact of information technologies on democracy and social inequality. He studies how new information technologies are used in both civic engagement and social control in countries around the world. He is Professor of Internet Studies at the Oxford Internet Institute and Balliol College at the University of Oxford. He has been Director of the Oxford Internet Institute and a Fellow at Harvard University's Carr Center for Human Rights Policy. Most recently, he helped establish the new International Panel on the Information Environment.

His latest book is Lie Machines: How to Save Democracy from Troll Armies, Deceitful Robots, Junk News Operations, and Political Operatives.

== Research ==
His research has demonstrated that the diffusion of digital media can have long-term, often positive, implications for democratic institutions, until authoritarian elites use those technologies for social control. Through information infrastructure, some young democracies have become more entrenched and durable; some authoritarian regimes have made significant transitions towards democratic institutions and practices; and others have become less authoritarian and hybrid where information technologies support the work of particular actors such as state, political parties, journalists, or civil society groups.

=== Astroturf campaigns and fake news ===
Howard was one of the first to investigate the impact of digital media on political campaigning in advanced democracies, and he was the first political scientist to define and study "astroturf" political movements as the managed perception of grassroots support through astroturfing in his research on the Gore and Bush presidential campaigns. New Media Campaigns and the Managed Citizen (2005) is about how politicians and lobbyists in the United States use the internet to manipulate the public and violate privacy. His research on technology and social change has been prescient. The subject's study of the 2016 U.S. presidential election did not identify the Russian sources of disinformation that other investigations have alluded to, though Howard later studied the disinformation campaigns launched by the Internet Research Agency.

=== Digital media and the Arab Spring ===
Howard wrote presciently about the role of the internet in transforming Political Islam, and is the author of The Digital Origins of Dictatorship and Democracy (2010) which argues that how states respond to new information technologies has become a defining feature of both democracy and authoritarianism. Howard demonstrated that the internet was having an important impact on political Islam. The book was published before the Arab Spring, and shows how new social movements in North Africa and the Middle East were using social media to outmaneuver some of the region's dictators, partly because these regimes lacked effective responses to online evidence of their abuses. Using Charles Ragin's method of "qualitative comparative analysis" Howard investigated technology diffusion and political Islam and explained trends in many countries, with the exception of Tunisia and Egypt. But very shortly the trends in social activism and political Islam he had identified appeared in those two countries as well in the "Arab Spring."

Democracy's Fourth Wave? (2013), with Muzammil M. Hussain, suggests that turning off the Internet, as the Mubarak regime did on January 28, 2011, actually strengthened the revolution by forcing people into the streets to seek information. It sees events like the Arab Spring as "early signs of the next big wave of democratization. But this time, it will be wrestled into life in the digital living room of the global community." His research and commentary is regularly featured in the media, including recent contributions about media politics in the US, Hungary and around the world the New York Times and Washington Post.

=== Politics and the Internet of Things ===
In Pax Technica (2015) he argues that the Internet of Things will be the most important tool of political communication we have ever built. He advocates for more public input in its design and more civic engagement with how this information infrastructure gets used.

=== Computational propaganda ===
In the book Lie Machines (2020) Howard introduces the idea of computational propaganda, and surveys the extent to which large-scale misinformation campaigns have shaped politics. He highlights the roots these developments have in propaganda but mobilizes contemporary data to argue that a host of technologies, techniques, and actors (e.g., AI bots, political activists, conspiracy theorists, national governments, and so forth) are innovating at a rapid pace. Lie Machines extends Howard's 2014 hypothesis that political elites in democracies would soon be using algorithms over social media to manipulate public opinion, a process he called "computational propaganda." Evidence from Russia, Myanmar, Hungary, Poland, Brazil, and of course the United States, documented in Lie Machines and scholarly articles and policy reports, further substantiate this hypothesis.

For example, his research on political redlining, astroturf campaigns and fake news inspired a decade of work and became particularly relevant during the Brexit referendum and the 2016 U.S. Presidential Campaign. His research has exposed the global impact of bots and trolls on public opinion.

=== Impact ===
As Director of the Democracy and Technology Programme at the Oxford Internet Institute, Howard has contributed to more than 130 reports on computational propaganda, political communication, election interference, and the abuse of social media by politicians and foreign governments. Like fellow Canadian researcher Ronald Deibert of the Citizen Lab, Howard's work is often critical of authoritarian regimes and the use of technology for political manipulation. Howard has testified before the UK Parliament, European Commission, and US Senate on election interference.

Howard is sometimes critiqued by the subjects of his research and investigations. After a reporter presented one of the research findings from a report that Howard was listed as the Primary Investigator on, President Rodrigo Duterte said: "Oxford University? That's a school for stupid people." Erik Wemple in The Washington Post and Elizabeth Harrington in The Washington Free Beacon argue that his research is biased against those who voted for President Donald Trump.

== Books ==
- Howard, Philip N. Lie Machines: How to Save Democracy from Troll Armies, Deceitful Robots, Junk News Operations, and Political Operatives. Yale University Press, 2020. ISBN 9780300250206
- Woolley, Samuel and Philip N. Howard. Computational Propaganda: Political Parties, Politicians, and Political Manipulation on Social Media. Oxford University Press, 2018. ISBN 0190931418, 9780190931414
- Howard, Philip N. Pax Technica: How the Internet of Things May Set Us Free or Lock Us Up. Yale University Press, 2015. Also published in German and Chinese. ISBN 0300213662, 9780300213669
- Howard, Philip N. (editor). State Power 2.0: Authoritarian Entrenchment and Civic Engagement Worldwide. Ashgate Press, 2013. ISBN 9781409454694
- Howard, Philip N. (coauthor). Democracy's Fourth Wave? Digital Media and the Arab Spring. Oxford University Press, 2013. ISBN 0199936951, 9780199936953
- Howard, Philip N. Castells and the Media. Polity Press, 2011. ISBN 074565259X, 9780745652580
- Howard, Philip N. The Digital Origins of Dictatorship and Democracy: Information Technology and Political Islam. Oxford University Press, 2011. ISBN 9780199736416, 9780199813667, 0199813663
- Howard, Philip N. (editor). Handbook of Internet Politics. Routledge, 2009. ISBN 9780415429146
- Howard, Philip N. New Media Campaigns and the Managed Citizen. Cambridge University Press, 2006. ISBN 0521847494, 9780521847490
- Howard, Philip N. (editor). Society Online: The Internet in Context. Sage, 2004. ISBN 0761927077

== Essays and journalism ==
- "Hungary's Crackdown on the Press," New York Times (2014)
- "Let's Make Candidates Pledge Not to Use Bots," Reuters (2015)
- "Politics won’t know what hit it: The Internet of Things is poised to change democracy itself," Politico (2015)
- Woolley, Samuel; Howard, Phil (May 15, 2016). "Bots Unite to Automate the Presidential Election". Wired.
- "Facebook and Twitter's Real Sin Goes Beyond Spreading Fake News," Reuters (2016)
