= Peter H. Russell =

Canadian political scientist (1932–2024)

Peter H. Russell CC FRSC

2nd Principal of Innis College, Toronto
- In office 1971 – 1976
- Preceded by: Robin Harris
- Succeeded by: William G. Saywell

Personal details
- Born: Peter Howard Russell; 16 November 1932 Toronto, Ontario, Canada
- Died: 10 January 2024 (aged 91)

Academic background
- Education: University of Toronto; Oriel College, Oxford

Academic work
- Discipline: Political science
- Institutions: Innis College, Toronto
- Doctoral students: Janet Ajzenstat

Peter Howard Russell CC FRSC (16 November 1932 – 10 January 2024) was a Canadian political scientist and professor emeritus of political science at the University of Toronto, where he taught from 1958 to 1997.

== Education ==
Russell was an alumnus of the University of Toronto Schools, Trinity College in the University of Toronto, and Oriel College, Oxford, where he studied as a Rhodes Scholar. He was also a member of the Toronto chapter of Alpha Delta Phi.

== Academic career ==
In the 1960s, Russell was asked by the Royal Commission on Bilingualism and Biculturalism to study the Supreme Court of Canada's approach to language. As a result, since 1969 all the Court's decisions are published in both English and French, and simultaneous translation is provided for court hearings.

Russell was the principal of Innis College, at the University of Toronto, from 1971 to 1976. He authored several books including: Two Cheers for Minority Government: The Evolution of Canadian Parliamentary Democracy, Constitutional Odyssey: Can Canadians Become a Sovereign People?, Recognizing Aboriginal Title: The Mabo Case and Indigenous Resistance to English Settler Colonialism and Canada's Odyssey: A Country Based on Incomplete Conquests.

Russell was director of research for the McDonald Commission on the RCMP, a member of the federal Task Force on Comprehensive Land Claims, president of the Canadian Political Science Association, and chair of the Research Advisory Committee for the Royal Commission on Aboriginal Peoples.

== Death ==
Russell died on 10 January 2024, at the age of 91.

== Awards and recognition ==
Russell received the Queen Elizabeth II Golden Jubilee Medal in 2002 and the Queen Elizabeth II Diamond Jubilee Medal in 2012.

He was the 2012 winner of the American Political Science Association's Mildred A. Schwartz Award.

Having been appointed an Officer of the Order of Canada (OC) in 1987, in the 2022 Canadian honours Russell was promoted to Companion of the Order of Canada (CC).

Professional and academic associations
Preceded by André J. Bélanger	President of the Canadian Political Science Association; 1990–1991	Succeeded by Vincent Lemieux
