= Susan Doniz =

Canadian businesswoman

- Born: 15 December 1970 (age 55)
- Education: University of Toronto; Eindhoven University of Technology
- Occupation: Chief information officer
- Employers: Disney (2025– ); Boeing (2020–2024); Qantas (2017–2020); Proctor & Gamble
- Board member of: Yum! Brands (2023– ); International Panel on the Information Environment (2025– )

Susan Doniz (born 15 December 1970) is a senior executive at Disney, where she serves as the chief information and data officer since February 2025. Prior to her appointment with Disney, Doniz has worked in similar leadership roles at Boeing and Qantas. Prior to her transition to Disney, Doniz guided Boeing's global IT strategy, digital modernization efforts and cybersecurity initiatives. She is a director of Yum! Brands and a trustee of the International Panel on the Information Environment, a global science body based in Zurich, Switzerland.

== Early life and education ==
Doniz is an honors graduate from Innis College at the University of Toronto; and completed post graduate study at Eindhoven University of Technology. Her native language is Spanish, and she advocates for Hispanic communities in addition to being fluent in English and French.

== Career ==
Doniz began her career at Procter & Gamble, where she managed several aspects of the company's global IT systems and worked on projects to improve internal processes and efficiency, working for the company for 17 years. She served in digital transformation and IT leadership roles at SAP and Aimia, and then joined Qantas in 2017 as group chief information officer (CIO). At Qantas she led the airline's technology strategy, integrating new technologies, building out cybersecurity capacity, and developing new customer-facing systems.

In May 2020 Doniz assumed her role as CIO and Senior Vice President of IT at Boeing, where she was responsible for aligning the company's technological infrastructure, strengthening the company's cybersecurity, and making the most of data analytics for customers and clients. Doniz, at Disney since February 2025, has worked for multiple Fortune-500 businesses on global IT strategy, data analytics, and digital transformation efforts designed to modernize operations, support supply chain advancements, and develop a technical workforce.

In December 2025, she was appointed as a trustee of the Swiss-based International Panel on the Information Environment; and has been a director of Yum! Brands since 2023.

Doniz has previously been involved with the Women's College Hospital Foundation, the Salvation Army, and Engineers Without Borders. She has served as an adviser to the Center for Digital Transformation at the UCI Paul Merage School of Business, and was previously the vice chair of the Digital Transformation Advisory Council of the International Air Transport Association.

== Awards and honors ==
Doniz has been recognized for her contributions as a Latina executive, and her pioneering work in digital transformation, in Forbes' 2022 CIO Next List. Her business leadership in technology has earned her recognition as being among the "Top 100 Women in Tech", the "Impact in Tech" Award, and a "Stevie Prize" for Women in Business, among other awards.
