= Innis College, Toronto =

Constituent college of the University of Toronto

Innis College
- Constituent college
- University of Toronto
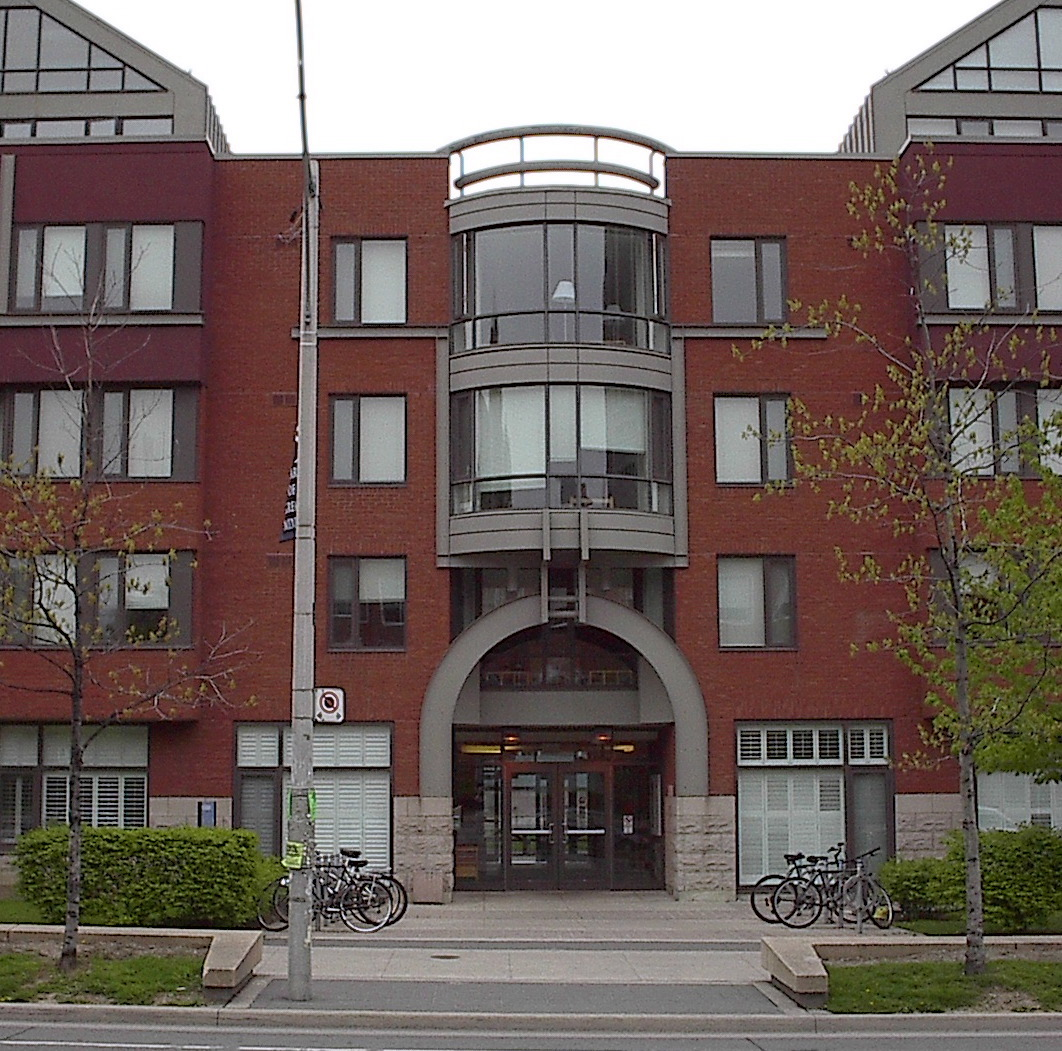

- Location: 2 Sussex Avenue; Toronto, Ontario, Canada
- Coordinates: 43°39′56″N 79°23′58″W
- Established: 1964; 62 years ago
- Named for: Harold Innis
- Colours: Blue and green
- Principal: Charlie Keil
- Undergraduates: 2,200
- Newspaper: The Innis Herald
- Website: innis.utoronto.ca

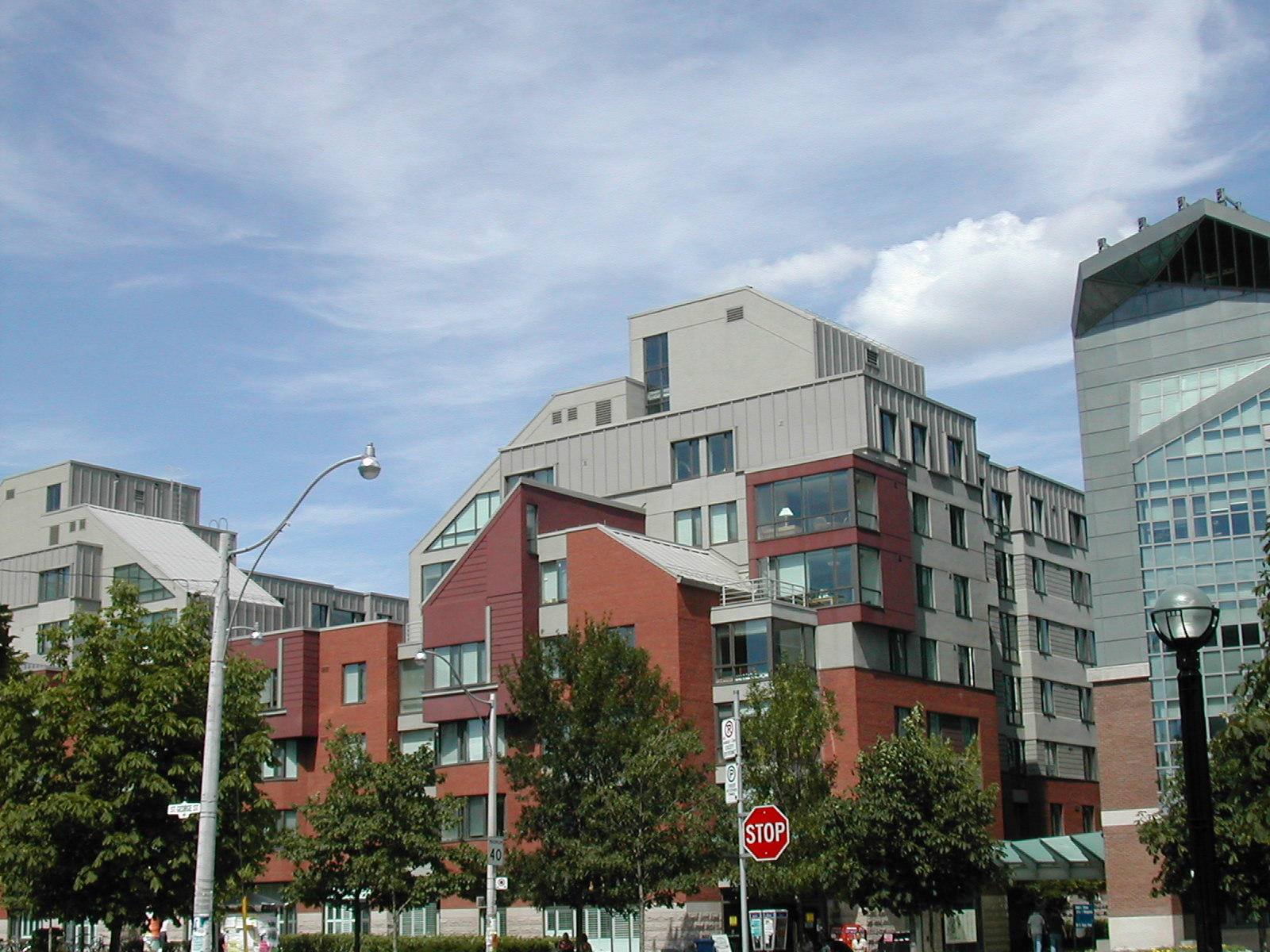
Innis College Residence on St. George Street

Innis College is one of the constituent colleges of the University of Toronto. It is one of the seven colleges in the university's Faculty of Arts and Science, and the University of Toronto's second smallest college in terms of population, with 2200 registered students. It is located on the St. George campus in its west end, directly north of Robarts Library, and is named after prominent University of Toronto political economist Harold Innis.

The College includes a fully equipped cinema known as Innis Town Hall, which hosts numerous film festivals, free film screenings, and a variety of other cultural events. It also serves as a venue for Hot Docs, which is North America's largest documentary film festival.

== History ==
Originally designed to be a wing (now Wetmore Hall) onto New College, Innis College was founded separately in 1964 as the second non-federated college to be formed under the University's administration. Although initially located at the Macdonald-Mowatt house on St. George Street, the College has since relocated to a building on Sussex Avenue that incorporates a substantial Victorian home into a functional modern structure designed by Jack Diamond and Barton Myers. Innis was also the first University of Toronto college to host an open pub (1975) and the first one to sport an equity split between faculty and students on its governing council.

The current Principal of Innis College is Charlie Keil. The current Innis Registrar is Donald Boere.

== Student Life ==
All Innis College students are members of the Faculty of Arts and Science at the University of Toronto. Governing student bodies include the Innis College Council, the Innis College Student Society (ICSS), and the Innis Residence Council.

Each September, Innis College participates in a campus-wide orientation event for first-year students. During the days leading up to the start of fall classes, students have the opportunity to take part in campus-wide activities, workshops, and team-building opportunities.

The Office of Student Life (OSL) at Innis College oversees various student support services. They offer health and wellness supports, assist students in finding community through clubs and activities, and direct the Innis Insider Mentorship Program. Innis College also offers an Alumni Mentorship Program that connects students with graduated and working Innis students.

The Innis Registrar's Office, located on the first floor of the college, serves as a reliable first-stop for students with questions pertaining to academics, finances, mental health, and beyond. Other student supports include the Innis Writing Centre, Learning Strategists, and Academic Advisors.

Since 1965, The Innis Herald newspaper has served the Innis community with four published editions per academic year. As of 2022, The Innis Herald also runs a podcast funded by the Community Radio Fund of Canada.

In 2024, the group Out at Innis was formed to serve as an advocacy and advisory group to support 2SLGBTQ+ students at the college. In 2025, the group hosted the Canadian premiere of The History of Sound.

== Governance and services ==
Innis College was the first college at the University of Toronto to have parity between students and faculty on its governing council. The main governing body of Innis College is the Innis College Council and operates under the Governing Council of the University of Toronto. The College Council is made up of students, administration, and other interest groups including the members of the later life learning program, and the alumni association to name a few. The council has many boards including boards on academic affairs, college affairs, student affairs, and community affairs. It is the job of the council to exercise the college's autonomous rights granted to them by the University and therefore oversees admissions, awards, and academic programs offered by the college.

The students of Innis College as well as the engineers living in the Innis Residence are members of the Innis College Student Society (ICSS). The ICSS is represented by a governing body that offers student services, as well as social events held by the college. The governing body of the ICSS is made up of an executive body, student representatives, and operations directors, all of whom are students.

Innis College is home to the Cinema Studies Student Union (CINSSU) and the Urban Studies Student Union (URSSU); the representative unions of students enrolled in Cinema Studies and Urban Studies programs.

Innis College is watched over by an administrative staff consisting of the Principal's Office and Registrar's Office, as well as the Innis Town Hall and Innis College Library staff.

=== Principals ===
Below is a list of principals of Innis College.

1. Robin Harris (1964–1971)
2. Peter H. Russell (1971–1976)
3. William G. Saywell (1976–1979)
4. Dennis Duffy (1979–1985)
5. John W. Browne (1985–2000)
6. Frank Cunningham (2000–2005)
7. Janet Paterson (2005–2015)
8. Charlie Keil (2015–present)

== Academic programs ==
All students of the College are enrolled in the Faculty of Arts and Science. Innis College also hosts several programs in the faculty, which are:

- Cinema Studies (Innis is home to the Cinema Studies Institute, which not only offers the undergraduate program, but also graduate programs: a one-year MA program and PhD program)
- Urban Studies
- Writing and Rhetoric (Minor)
- First Year Foundations (FYF) courses: Innis One Program and FYF@Innis Seminars

Innis College students are welcome to enrol in any program within the Faculty of Arts and Science, and any student in the Faculty may enrol in one (or more) of Innis' programs.

The College formerly hosted the Environmental Studies program before it was relocated to the University's Centre for Environment.

== Innis Residence ==
Vladimir House, the first Innis residence located at 651 Spadina Avenue, was replaced by a larger, modern residence in 1994. The Innis Residence was built in 1994 and is a modern apartment-style building with seven stories, located across the street from the College at 111 St. George Street. This residence was the first apartment-style dorm on campus. The building consists of four floors that form a U-shape around a courtyard, and two 3-story towers above them, on the north and south sides of the building. The building is suite-style - each suite contains a common kitchen, common living room, two shared bathrooms and 4-5 bedrooms. There are 327 spaces available for students in the building, which roughly consist of 60% first-year students and 40% upper-years. A number of spaces are also reserved for students from the Faculty of Applied Science and Engineering.

The residence consists of six social communities known as houses. The houses are First House (named because it is located on the first floor of the building), Devonshire West House (named after the street that backs the residence to the east), Taddle Creek House (named after the buried stream that formerly flowed through Downtown Toronto), Vladimir House (named after the original Innis residence building), North House (named because it is located in the building's north tower), and Ajax House (named after a University of Toronto's former satellite campus in Ajax). These social communities hold inter-residence competitions to build unity and add to the student experience. Each house is overseen by Residence Dons. The residence also hires an Assistant Dean of Residence Life and a front desk staff that offers 24-hour security to the building. The residence is also home to a student-run Innis Residence Council (IRC).

== Notable alumni ==
- Jay Bahadur – journalist and author
- Alan Bernstein – founding president, CIHR & Executive Director, Global HIV Vaccine Enterprise
- Jessi Cruickshank – Canadian television personality
- Sabrina Cruz – Canadian YouTuber
- Susan Doniz – senior executive with Disney
- Sarah Gadon – actress, winner of best supporting actress in a Canadian film by Vancouver Film Critics Circle, Cosmopolis (film)
- Chris Glover – Member of Provincial Parliament for Spadina-Fort York
- Ron Mann – president, Sphinx Productions; filmmaker
- Kate Raynes-Goldie – award-winning internet scholar, game designer and industry evangelist
- Jeffrey Ian Ross – criminologist, University of Baltimore
- Stephanie Savage – executive producer and creator, Gossip Girl
- Linda Schuyler – executive producer and creator, Degrassi franchise
- Alan Whitten – judge of the Ontario Superior Court of Justice
- Jean Yoon – actress Kim's Convenience

== Notable faculty ==
- Peter H. Russell – Canadian constitutional scholar, helped write the South African Constitution.
- Joe Medjuck – film producer
- Josef Škvorecký – writer
- Brett Story – writer and filmmaker
