= Samuel Woolley =

Samuel Woolley is an American media studies scholar and expert on computational propaganda and misinformation. Woolley was a founder of the Computational Propaganda Research Project at the University of Oxford in 2013, and the Institute for the Future's Digital Intelligence Lab. As of 2025, he is an associate professor at the University of Pittsburgh in their Department of Communication, and holds the University's William S. Dietrich II Endowed Chair In Disinformation Studies.

Woolley's books include The Reality Game: How the Next Wave of Technology Will Break the Truth (2020) and Manufacturing Consensus: Understanding Propaganda in the Era of Automation and Anonymity (2023).
