= Peñabot =

2010s Mexico political scandal

Peñabot is the nickname for automated social media accounts allegedly used by the Mexican government of Enrique Peña Nieto and the PRI political party to keep unfavorable news from reaching the Mexican public. Peñabot accusations are related to the broader issue of fake news in the 21st century.

== History of disinformation in Mexican politics ==
The PRI political party has been reported to use fake news since before Peña Nieto. The main tactic originally was to spread such propaganda through open radio and television networks. Such tactic was effective in Mexico, because newspaper readership is low and cable TV is largely limited to the middle classes; consequently, the country's two major television networks – Televisa and TV Azteca – exert a significant influence in national politics. Televisa itself, not only owns around two-thirds of the programming on Mexico's TV channels, making it not only Mexico's largest television network, but also is the largest media network in the Spanish-speaking world.

== Peñabots ==
Analysts have given the name Peñabots to a suspected network of automated accounts on social media used by the Mexican government to spread pro-government propaganda and to marginalize dissenting opinions in social media. The bots were first noticed in the 2012 elections when they were used to disseminate opinions in support of Enrique Peña Nieto on social networks such as Twitter and Facebook.

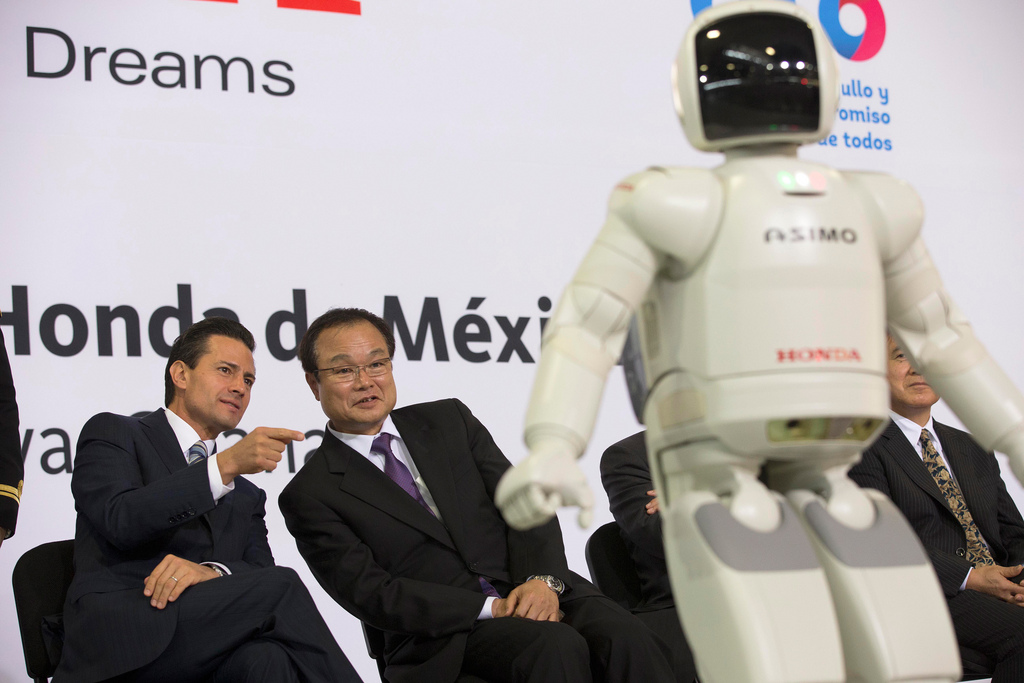
Mexican President Enrique Peña Nieto at the inauguration of a Honda factory in Celaya.

According to Aristegui Noticias, their usage went against articles 6 and 134 of the Mexican Constitution. Those used by Peña Nieto's government cost an estimated 80 million pesos monthly, which news outlets argued only helped the government spread fake support towards the president, but did not have a benefit towards Mexican people (with whom EPN was highly unpopular). Facebook held approximately 640,321 Peñabots, while Twitter had less. As of July 2017, Oxford Internet Institute's Computational Propaganda Research Project claimed many western democracies, Mexico included, perform social media manipulation, thus saying the manipulation comes directly from the Mexican government itself.

During Peña Nieto's subsequent presidency, analysts noted that Peñabots were used to overpower trending topics that critiqued government, to flood trending government critical hashtags with spam, to create fake trends by pushing alternative hashtags, and to push smear campaigns and threats against government-critical activists and journalists. Peñabots were distinguished as their pattern of activity was distinct from that of ordinary interaction on social networks.

=== Meadebots ===
On Twitter it was reported that about 94% of the followers of 2018 presidential candidate from the PRI Jose Antonio Meade were bots. When Antonio Meade presented himself as a candidate for the 2018 presidential election, his social media accounts such as "@MovimientoMEADE" (created by the PRI's official account @PRI_Nacional), obtained a huge quantity of followers in a short span of time. Some users noticed and brought it to attention, and after investigation it was reported 94% of such followers were bots (702,000 out of 747,000), and the account was eliminated from Twitter after 20 hours. The fake accounts used the hashtags #YoConMeade and #Meade18. It was further revealed was that Meade's official account on Twitter, @JoseAMeadeK had 25% bots (216,000 fake followers out of the 981,000).

== Manipulation of news media in Mexico, through television ==
The Mexican government of Peña Nieto has been accused of using various means to keep unfavorable news from reaching the Mexican people. Many Mexicans have protested this practice as it clearly goes against the freedom of speech. The PRI has been reported to use fake news since before Peña Nieto. The main tactic has been to spread such propaganda through radio and television. This tactic is perceived as effective in Mexico, because newspaper readership is low and research on the Internet and cable TV is largely limited to the middle classes; consequently, the country's two major television networks – Televisa and TV Azteca – exert a significant influence in national politics. Televisa itself, owns around two-thirds of the programming on Mexico's TV channels, making it not only Mexico's largest television network, but also is the largest media network in the Spanish-speaking world.

In June 2012, before the 2012 Mexican presidential elections, the British newspaper The Guardian published a series of allegations claiming Televisa, sold favorable coverage to top politicians in its news and entertainment shows, this scandal became known as the Televisa controversy. The documents published by 'The Guardian alleged that a secretive circle within Televisa manipulated news coverage to favor PRI presidential candidate Enrique Peña Nieto, who was poised as favorite to win. Televisa's secret circle supposedly commissioned videos to promote Peña Nieto and lash out his political rivals in 2009. The Guardian documents suggest that Televisa's secret team distributed such videos through e-mail, posting them posted them on Facebook and YouTube, some can still be seen there. Another document was a PowerPoint presentation, with a slide explicitly aimed at rival leftist candidate of the Party of the Democratic Revolution (PRD), Andrés Manuel López Obrador. Supposedly given to The Guardian by a Televisa employee. The document's authenticity was never possible to confirm– however dates, names, and events largely coincide. Televisa refused to talk the documents, and denied a relationship with the PRI or its presidential candidate, saying that they had provided equal media coverage to all parties. Televisa published an article supposedly showing discrepancies in The Guardian documents and denying accusations.

Mexican citizens complained about the perceived favoritism towards Enrique Peña Nieto and the PRI, protesting through the Yo Soy 132 movement which Televisa covered in detail. However, Televisa's news media coverage is perceived to have been biased, by using a media coverage tactic Mexican citizens call cortinas de humo (smoke screens). These introduce a news scandal giving extensive coverage to distract citizens from a potential conflict-of-interest or controversy that could damage the image of the politician favored by the network. An example of a perceived smoke screen would be the news media coverage of "Caso Michoacán" and "Caso Paolette" distracting all the attention from the parallel "Yo soy 132" movement. A few years later, on the day of September 11, 2016; factual evidence of Televisa's performing media manipulation emerged, when a Televisa news anchor while live-on air reading a teleprompter, mistakenly read out loud that "try that Jaime "Ël Bronco" Rodríguez Calderón (Nuevo Leon's governor) is mentioned as little as possible". Newspaper El Universal caught it on video and published it social media. Televisa didn't mention the story and declined to comment. Lack of news coverage concerning Nuevo León's Governor Jaime Rodriguez, is perceived due to him being the first elected governor to not be part of any political party (Independent Governor), and because unlike the governors from the PRI preceding him, the independent governor "El Bronco" doesn't spend money on publicity at all, preferring to communicate all news by using social media such as Twitter and Facebook. While the incident may have proven Televisa's bias, there wasn't anything to incriminate the PRI political party or Enrique Peña Nieto, though it did further suspicion of Televisa manipulating news media. In contrast, a December 2017 article of The New York Times, reported Enrique Peña Nieto spending about 2000 million dollars on publicity, during his first 5 years as president, the largest publicity budget ever spent by a Mexican President. Additionally, 68 percent of news journalists admitted to not believe to have enough freedom of speech, and award-winning news reporter Carmen Aristegui was controversially fired shortly after revealing the Mexican White House scandals.

== Violence and spying towards news journalists and civil rights activists ==
Far for only being receiving accusations of spreading fake news, the Mexican government of EPN (Enrique Peña Nieto) has also been accused of violence towards news journalists, and of spying on them, and also towards civil right leaders and their families. During his tenure as president, Peña Nieto has been accused of failing to protect news journalists, whose deaths are speculated to be politically triggered, by politicians attempting to prevent them from covering political scandals. The New York Times published a news report on the matter titled, "In Mexico it's easy to kill a journalist", on it mentioning how during EPN's government, Mexico became one of the worst countries on which to be a journalist. The assassination of journalist Javier Valdez on May 23, 2017, received national coverage, with multiple news journalists asking for "real protection", as well as freedom of speech. The president announced to be "deeply wounded" by such death, Despite this Mexican citizens, as well as political party of opposition perceived, the presidential words as hypocritical, and the outlook does not look favorable with Mexico already leading as the country most journalist killed in 2017, with 5 assassinations.

On June 19, 2017, The New York Times in conjunction with news reporter Carmen Aristegui, and even backed by a Televisa news reporter Carlos Loret de Mola, reported that the Mexican Government uses a spyware software known as Pegasus, to spy on targets such as Mexican News reporters (and their families) and Civil Rights Leaders (and their families) using text messages as lures. Since 2011, the Mexican Government invested $80 million worth of spyware. Pegasus spyware infiltrates a person's cellphone and reports every detail of their messages, e-mails, contacts and calendars. After the revelation, the Israeli manufacturer of the Pegasus spyware, NSO Group, re-stated it only sold such technology to governments with an 'explicit agreement', that such technology was meant 'only to combat organized crime' by spying on it; although once it sells the software it cannot control who they use it against and basically leaves the government's on their own to monitor themselves on not abusing the software. The New York Times and independent forensic analysts analyzed the data of 'dozens of messages', multiple times before proving their accusation, and commented of such espionage towards news journalists and civil rights leaders, as 'an effort from the Mexican Government to thwart the battle against corruption infecting every limb of Mexican Society', and how highly unlikely it would be for such espionage it to receive 'Judicial Approval'. Edward Snowden who worked for US government's NSA before revealing it to spy on its citizens, also said all evidence points to the Mexican government being the spy, and on Twitter said it is "a crime to the public".

The hacking attempts were 'highly personalized' for each target, they would consist on sending text messages with an attached link, and for the spyware to enter a users smartphone, all it needed was for the smartphone owner to click on the link. The news reporter Carmen Aristegui, whom previously in 2014, had revealed a conflict of interest regarding the president ownership of a Mexican "Casa Blanca (White House)" and was unfairly fired from her job for airing such investigation, herself, received 22 hacking attempts, the most for any journalist who has been found targeted, one of those attempts disguised as a message sent by an American Embassy in Mexico, trying to help her with a problem with her Visa; additionally Aristegui's son Emilio Aristegui received attempts for 23 months despite being an under-age 16-year-old teen. News media perceived attempts at Aristegui as revenge from the Mexican government. News reporter Carlos Loret de Mora received 8 attempts. While, Juan E. Pardinas, the director of the Mexican Institute of Competitiveness, also received multiple attempts where he was told men with guns were outside his house and another where a contact not on his list invited him to his father funeral because saying he was a "close friend", the attempt on his wife went as far as claiming Padilla was having an extramarital affair, but she could only see the evidence if she clicked the link. Also, most of the parents, protesters and the major leaders of the investigations of the "Ayotzinapa, 43 Students Massacre" received spyware messages, so did the "Women of Atenco" (a scandal directly tied to Enrique Peña Nieto's time as Governor of the State of Mexico).The New York Times article contained a picture of EPN.

On June 20, 2017, the day after. The opposition political party, National Action Party (PAN) denounced the Mexican government to the Inter-American Commission on Human Rights for suspicions of violations towards human rights and requested them, to lead an investigation citing such spying causes violations towards the article 16th of the Mexican Constitution, as well as violating article 11th of the Universal Declaration of Human Rights. While, in response to the accusations, Peña Nieto made public that such technology was bought and indeed used by the Mexican government, but he denied misuses, and stated that it was only used to protect Mexicans by searching for criminal by saying he "also felt spied upon, but there was nothing more fake than blaming the (Mexican) government", and that there was "no proof"; saying he ordered the PGR an investigation and that he hoped "under the law, it can be applied against those that have raised false accusations against the government.", with the last part of the quote making journalist hacking victims feel threatened. Which forced the Mexican president to call writer of the article Azam Ahmed to tell him, he was not menacing him. However, due to his previous presidential scandals, Peña Nieto words lacked credibility to most Mexicans, with journalist like Jorge Ramos complaining about how Enrique Peña Nieto remains in power despite his illegal actions. Later on the day political rival Andrés Manuel López Obrador (AMLO) who competed for the presidency against EPN in 2012 and intends to compete again in 2018 as the candidate from the MORENA political party, was also revealed to be among the hacking targets, with his son also as a target. On June 23, 2017, the National Human Rights Commission (Mexico) opened a case regarding the government espionage.

As of February 2018, Reuters published an article stating the Mexican government has not properly investigated the Pegasus spyware usage to spy news journalists.

== Andrés Sepúlveda claims of hacking the Mexican presidential election, 2012 ==
On March 31, 2016, in an article published by magazine Bloomberg Business Week a Colombian, a hacker named Andrés Sepúlveda claimed to have paid $600,000 pesos, by the "Institutional Revolutionary Party (PRI)" for hacking files (including phone calls, e-mails and strategies) pertaining Peña Nieto's rivals respective political campaigns, and also manipulate social media to create fake news against his opponents with 30,000 fakes Twitter accounts whom helped him create fake trending topics, and the perception of public enthusiasm towards Peña Nieto's 2012 presidential campaign. The election day he claims to have been watching a Live feed on Bogota, Colombia and to start destroying evidence (USBs, cellphones, computers) right after Peña Nieto was declared winner. He said he was helped by a team of 6 hackers, which he led. He also claims to have helped hack elections from other Latin American countries including Nicaragua, Panama, Honduras, El Salvador, Colombia, Costa Rica, Guatemala and Venezuela, but said his Mexican operation was "the most complex by far". The hacker is on a 10-year prison sentence for confessing and proving crimes on helping the campaign of Ivan Zuloagawithin his native Colombia. While Juan José Rendón whom Sepúlveda describes as his accomplice hasn't been proved guilty and still remains free. The National Action Party (PAN) requested an investigation, but on May 4, 2016, the Consejo General del Instituto Nacional Electoral (General Council of the National Electoral Institute) discarded the investigation describing it as "frivolous" and that it was based on a single journalistic note. presidential counselor Ciro Murayama said there wasn't enough evidence to lead an investigation, and that they would sue PAN for promoting unjustified investigations, leading to sourness between both political parties.

== Influence of perceived media manipulation of news in Mexican popular culture ==
The controversies regarding the perceived Televisa news media coverage in favor of the PRI, and the spreading of fake news by the Mexican government, has influenced Mexican popular culture. Director and writer Luis Estrada released the black-comedy film The Perfect Dictatorship (2014), it was based on the perceived media manipulation in Mexico. Set in a Mexico with a tightly controlled media landscape, the plot centered on a corrupt politician (a fictional stand-in for Enrique Peña Nieto) from a political party (serving as a fictional stand-in for the PRI), and how he makes a deal with TV MX (which serves as a stand-in to Televisa) to manipulate the diffusion of news towards his benefit, in order to save his political career.
