= Global Initiative for Information Integrity on Climate Change =

Global Initiative for Information Integrity on Climate Change is an initiative established by UNESCO, the Government of Brazil, and the UN to help member states systematic problems with access to reliable information about climate change. The initiative includes support from UN member states on addressing disinformation and funding for initiatives designed to apply the UN's Global Principles for Information Integrity to climate change.

The initiative was launched in 2024 in anticipation of the Brazilian presidency for the 2025 United Nations Climate Change Conference, and partially funded by the Brazilian Government. The first round of grantees from the fund was announced before COP 30. The initiative funds a number of actions to combat disinformation about climate change. The main focus of the first funding from the program is on understanding and mitigating disinformation in countries in the Global South.

== COP 30 and Declaration on Information Integrity on Climate Change ==
At COP 30, disinformation was added to the negotiation agenda by the Brazilian presidency. At the opening of the conference Brazilian president Luiz Inácio Lula da Silva described the COP as the "COP of Truth" for beginning discussion of these topics. At the COP, the increasing role of AI in spreading disinformation was also discussed.

The Global Initiative for Climate Change Information Integrity presented the "Declaration on Information Integrity on Climate Change" at a High-Level Event at COP30.

Signatory countries committed to promote information integrity related to climate change, diverse and resilient media, international cooperation, and capacity building, along with calls to private sector, governments, academia, civil society, and funders. The declaration was signed by: Austria, Belgium, Brazil, Canada, Chile, the Czech Republic, Denmark, Estonia, Finland, France, Germany, Iceland, Luxembourg, the Netherlands, Norway, Poland, Portugal, Slovenia, Spain, Sweden, and Uruguay.

== National initiatives ==
On 30 July 2025, the Australian Parliament established the Select Committee on Information Integrity on Climate Change and Energy, to inquire into the prevalence and impacts of misinformation and disinformation relating to climate change and energy in Australia. The final report, The Integrity Gap: Restoring Trust in the Climate and Energy Debate, was published in March 2026. The Select Committee report recommended that the Australian Government support and adopt the United Nations Global Principles on Information Integrity and officially endorse the Declaration on Information Integrity on Climate Change launched at COP30.
