= Oona Eisenstadt =

American religious studies scholar

- Education: B.A. and Ph.D. McMaster University
- Occupation: Religious Studies Scholar

Oona Eisenstadt is an American religious studies scholar. She is the Fred Krinsky Professor of Jewish Studies and Professor of Religious Studies at Pomona College in Claremont, California, and the chair of the college's English department. Her research interests include continental philosophy, Jewish philosophy, and religious themes in children's literature. She is an expert on the philosophers Emmanuel Levinas and Jacques Derrida.
