= 2011 Mexican drug gang attack Twitter hoax =

Hoaxes on social media

On August 25, 2011, Gilberto Martínez Vera and María de Jesús Bravo Pagola made a series of fraudulent Twitter tweets alleging that an attack by drug gangs was in progress at an elementary school in Veracruz, Mexico. The tweets caused mass panic that was compared to the War of the Worlds panic. The two were charged with terrorism and faced more than 30 years in jail. The charges were later dropped.

There were 26 car accidents as people left their cars in the middle of the streets, as they ran to pick up their children.
