= Computational propaganda =

Propaganda method based on digital technologies

Computational propaganda is the use of computational tools (algorithms and automation) to distribute misleading information using social media networks. The advances in digital technologies and social media resulted in enhancement in methods of propaganda. It is characterized by automation, scalability, and anonymity.

Autonomous agents (internet bots) can analyze big data collected from social media and the Internet of things in order to manipulate public opinion in a targeted way, and to mimic real people on social media. Bots use coordination to gain a larger reach Digital technology builds upon existing methods of manipulating public opinion. It appeals to people's emotions and biases to circumvent rational thinking and promote specific ideas.

A pioneering work in identifying and analyzing of the concept has been done by the team of Philip N. Howard at the Oxford Internet Institute who since 2012, have been investigating computational propaganda, following earlier Howard's research of the effects of social media on general public, published, e.g., in his 2005 book New Media Campaigns and the Managed Citizen and earlier articles. In 2017, they published a series of articles detailing computational propaganda's presence in several countries.

Regulatory efforts have proposed tackling computational propaganda tactics using multiple approaches. Detection techniques are another front considered towards mitigation; these can involve machine learning models, with early techniques having issues such as a lack of datasets or failing against the gradual improvement of accounts. Newer techniques to address these aspects use other machine learning techniques or specialized algorithms, yet other challenges remain such as increasingly believable text and its automation.

== Mechanisms ==
Computational propaganda is the strategic posting on social media of misleading information by fake accounts that are automated to a degree in order to manipulate readers.

=== Bots and coordination ===
In social media, bots are accounts pretending to be human. They are managed to a degree via programs, and are used to spread information that leads to mistaken impressions. In social media, they may be referred to as "social bots", and may be helped by popular users that amplify them and make them seem reliable through sharing their content. Bots allow propagandists to keep their identities secret. One study from Oxford's Computational Propaganda Research Project indeed found that bots achieved effective placement in Twitter during a political event.

Bots can be coordinated, which may be leveraged to make use of algorithms. Propagandists mix real and fake users; their efforts make use of a variety of actors, including botnets, online paid users, astroturfers, seminar users, and troll armies. Bots can provide a fake sense of prevalence. Bots can also engage in spam and harassment. They are progressively becoming sophisticated, one reason being the improvement of AI. Such development complicates detection for humans and automatized methods alike.

=== Influence of bots on public opinion ===
Bots play an important role not only in the spread of information, but also in shaping how people think, feel, and act online. Research shows that being exposed to bots can change how people see the popularity of certain opinions, often making them believe that a viewpoint is more widely accepted than it actually is. This can lead individuals to adjust their own opinions to match what they think most people believe.

As well, bots tend to amplify emotional and polarizing content, especially in political discussions. By increasing the visibility of negative or controversial messages, bots can trigger stronger emotional reactions and deepen divisions between groups. This can change the overall tone of online conversations and reinforce people’s existing beliefs.

Arceneaux et al. (2026) explored the implications of social bots in political communication during the 2022 Ohio midterm elections. The authors' research found that social bots influenced the issues and topics discussed in campaign communication. The bots often had a strong influence on campaign messages that expressed a negative tone. The social bots' influence over the public and press was weaker than their influence on campaign communication.

Even a small number of bots in a network can influence how opinions are distributed. Studies show that bots can amplify extreme viewpoints and create greater instability in the emotional tone of online discussions, which affects how public opinion develops. These findings show that it is important to understand not only how computational propaganda works, but also its psychological and social effects.

=== Problematic information ===
The problematic content tactics propagandists employ include disinformation, misinformation, and information shared regardless of veracity. The spread of fake and misleading information seeks to influence public opinion. Deepfakes and generative language models are also employed, creating convincing content. The proportion of misleading information is expected to grow, complicating detection.

Farcaș (2025) suggests that generative artificial intelligence (AI) can also be used in a manner that creates propaganda and disinformation on a larger scale. AI can generate content that may appear to be credible, which allows the message to be designed for users' interests, attitudes, and online behavior on an individual level. This varies from the traditional approach of producing propaganda and disinformation, as these forms of media rely heavily on more generalized messages that pertain to a larger audience.

Farcaș (2025) discussed the manner in which synthetic media, including deepfake audio and realistic videos, can be used as a tool to spread disinformation in politics. The research discusses how a fabricated audio recording that was shared before Slovakia’s 2023 parliamentary election depicted the political leader engaging in a fake discussion covering plans to rig the election. This example illustrates how synthetic media can be used to spread misinformation in politics and possibly affect public perception.

Chen (2024) examines how Chinese state propaganda affected public opinion at the beginning of the COVID-19 pandemic. In the initial phases of the pandemic, the study found that the propaganda messages that functioned in promoting Xi Jinping’s leadership were more effective when they included images portraying him as being compassionate during his visit to Wuhan, China. Propaganda without images, text-based propaganda, were likely less effective in changing political opinions amongst the population. The results from the research work suggest that visual elements in propaganda worked to influence public opinion and attitudes about the government when the images evoke solidarity.

=== Algorithmic influence ===
Algorithms are another important element to computational propaganda. Algorithmic curation may influence beliefs through repetition. Algorithms boost and hide content, which propagandists use to their favor. Social media algorithms prioritize user engagement, and to that end their filtering prefers controversy and sensationalism. The algorithmic selection of what is presented can create echo chambers and assert influence.

One study poses that TikTok's automated (e.g. the sound page) and interactive (e.g. stitching, duetting, and the content imitation trend) features can also boost misleading information. Furthermore, anonymity is kept through deleting the audio's origin.

== Multidisciplinary studies ==
A multidisciplinary approach has been proposed towards combating misinformation, proposing the use of psychology to understand its effectiveness. Some studies have looked at misleading information through the lens of cognitive processes, seeking insight into how humans come to accept it.

Media theories can help understand the complexity of relationships present in computational propaganda and surrounding actors, its effect, and to guide regulation efforts. Agenda-setting theory and framing theory have also been considered for analysis of computational propaganda phenomena, finding these effects present; algorithmic amplification is an instance of the former, which states media's selection and occlusion of topics influences the public's attention. It also states that repetition focuses said attention.

Repetition is a key characteristic of computational propaganda; in social media it can modify beliefs. One study posits that repetition makes topics fresh on the mind, having a similar effect on perceived significance. The illusory truth effect, which states that people will believe what is repeated to them over time, has also been suggested to bring into light that computational propaganda may be doing the same.

Other phenomena have been proposed to be at play in computational propaganda tools. One study posits the presence of the megaphone effect, the bandwagon effect, and cascades. Other studies point to the use of content that evokes emotions. Another tactic used is suggesting connection between topics by placing them in the same sentence. Incidence of trust bias, validation By intuition rather than evidence, truth bias, confirmation bias, and Cognitive dissonance are present as well. Another study points to the occurrence of negativity bias and novelty bias.

== Spread ==
Bots are used by both private and public parties and have been observed in politics and crises. Its presence has been studied across many countries, with incidence in more than 80 countries. Some studies have found bots to be effective, though another found limited impact. Similarly, algorithmic manipulation has been found to have an effect.

== Regulation ==
Some studies propose a strategy that incorporates multiple approaches towards regulation of the tools used in computational propaganda. Controlling misinformation and its usage in politics through legislation and guidelines; having platforms combat fake accounts and misleading information; and devising psychology-based intervention tactics are some of the possible measures. Information Literacy has also been proposed as an affront to these tools.

However, it has also been reported that some of these approaches have their faults. In Germany, for example, legislation efforts have encountered problems and opposition. In the case of social media, self-regulation is hard to request. These platforms' measures also may not be enough and put the power of decision on them. Information literacy has its limits as well.

Howard, Woolley, and Calo (2018) analyzed the use of political bots and through the possible uses identified, discussed possible challenges directed at election law and administration in the United States. The authors of this article identified three areas in campaign regulations that could possibly be affected by automated political communication, these being, coordination between political candidates and outside groups, solicitation of campaign contributions or votes, and disclosure requirements for political communications.

== Detection ==
Computational propaganda detection can focus either on content or on accounts.

=== Detecting propaganda content ===
Propaganda content can be detected via methods such as text analysis and social network analysis. Early techniques to detect coordination involved mostly supervised models such as decision trees, random forests, support vector machines and neural networks. These just analyze accounts one by one without modeling coordination. Advanced bots and the difficulty in finding or creating datasets have hindered these detection methods. Modern detection techniques' strategies include making the model study a large group of accounts considering coordination, creating specialized algorithms for it, and building unsupervised and semi-supervised models.

Sela et al. (2025) analyzed the patterns in which information is spread on social networks and how these patterns can help to identify potential computational propaganda. The researchers found differences between political discussions and discussions about large-scale disasters in the use of hashtag repetition, user mentions, and the structure of information-sharing networks. The study suggests that patterns such as these could help distinguish political information from discussions about large-scale disasters. This data can help identify possible attempts to influence online discussions.

=== Detecting propaganda accounts ===
Detecting accounts has a variety of approaches: they either seek to find the author of a piece, use statistical methods, analyze a mix of both text and data beyond it such as account characteristics, or scan user activity tendencies. This second focus also has a Social Network Analysis approach, with a technique that looks at time elements on campaigns alongside features of detected groups.

=== Limitations ===
Detection techniques are not without their issues. One of them is that actors evolve their coordination techniques and can operate in the time it takes for detection methods to be created, requiring real-time approaches. Other challenges detection faces are that techniques have yet to adapt to different media formats, should integrate explainability, could inform the how and why of a propagandistic document or user, and may face increasingly difficult to detect content and may further be automatized. It is also presented with a lack of datasets, and creating them can involve sensitive user data that requires extensive work to protect them.

== See also ==
- AI-generated content in American politics
- Slopaganda
