= CSO Platform SDG Ghana =

National civil-society coordination network

CSO Platform on SDGs (Ghana)
- Formation: October 2015
- Type: Civil society network
- Purpose: Coordinating and supporting civil society action toward the Sustainable Development Goals (SDGs) in Ghana
- Headquarters: Accra, Ghana
- Region served: Ghana
- Members: Over 300 civil society organisations
- Co-Chairs: Joseph Tettey Afangbe and Mary Awelana Addah

The Civil Society Organizations (CSOs) Platform on Sustainable Development Goals (SDGs) — often called the CSO Platform on SDGs (Ghana) is a national civil society coordination network established to mobilize, advocate, and monitor the implementation of the 2030 Agenda for Sustainable Development in Ghana.

== History ==
The Platform was established in October 2015 as Ghana began preparing to implement the Sustainable Development Goals. It was institutionalised in May 2016 following a national forum in Accra where more than 80 civil society organisations formalized their participation.

Since its formation, the Platform has expanded its membership, governance structure, and thematic areas across Ghana.

== Purpose and Objectives ==
The Platform coordinates civil society efforts to advance the 17 SDGs by:

- Strengthening collaboration among CSOs, government, and development partners.
- Advocating for accountable and inclusive national SDG implementation.

== Structure and Governance ==
The CSO Platform operates through 17 SDG sub-platforms, each corresponding to one of the global goals. Each sub-platform is led by a convener and co-convener who coordinate sector activities.

The overall governance is overseen by a National Steering Committee, comprising conveners and co-conveners of the sub-platforms. The committee is co-chaired and supported by a Secretariat led by a National Coordinator.

== Membership ==
The Platform's membership includes over 300 organizations, including local and international NGOs, coalitions, faith-based organizations, and community-based groups operating across Ghana.

== Activities and Impact ==
The Platform has contributed to:

- Developing Ghana's SDG implementation framework.
- Preparing shadow reports to complement government reporting.
- Participating in initiatives such as the Strategic Partnership Initiative for Ghana and West Africa, focusing on inclusion and gender-based violence.

== Leadership ==
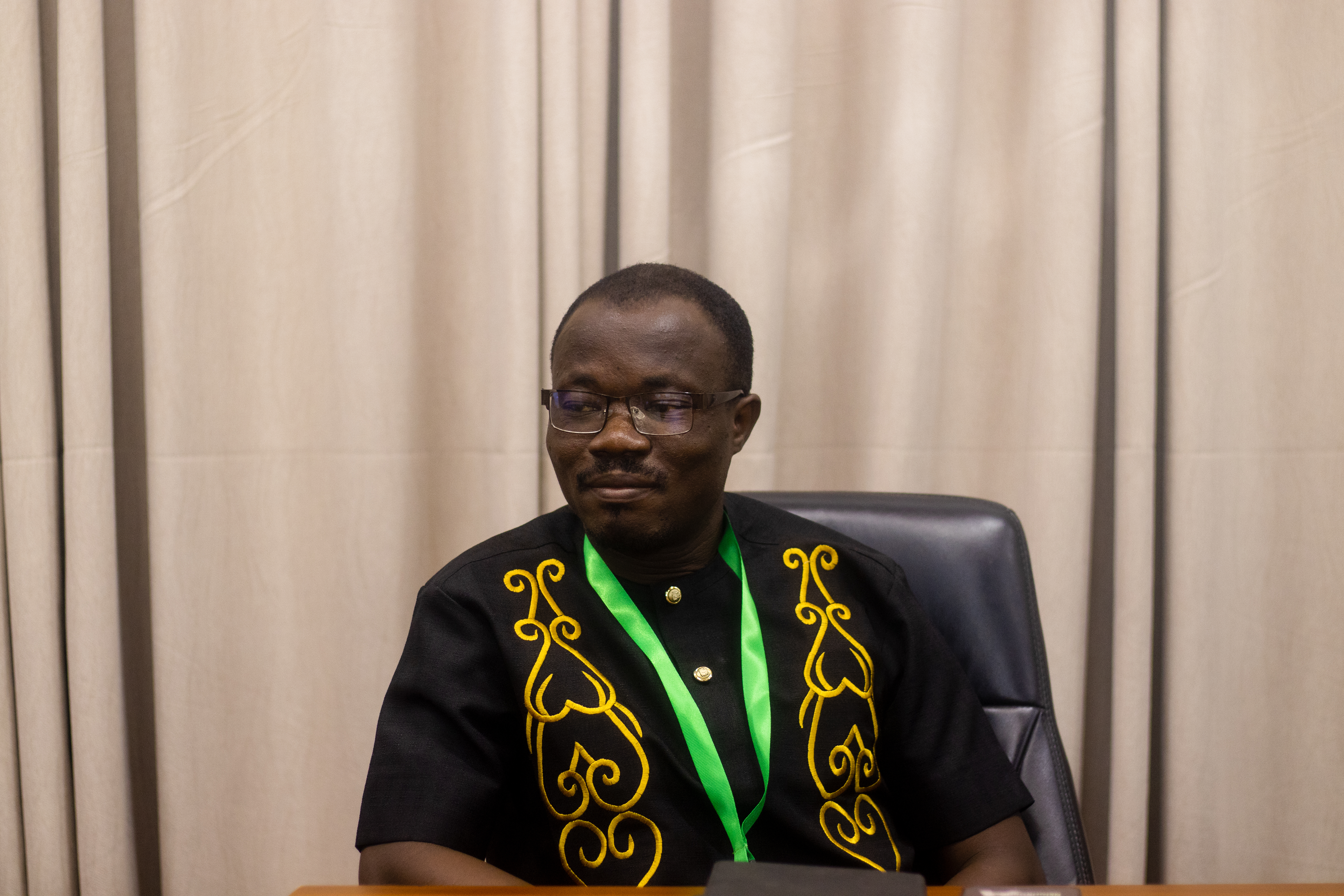
Joseph Tettey Afangbe

As of 2024, the Platform's Co-Chairs are Joseph Tettey Afangbe (Young Visionary Leaders Ghana), Mary Awelana Addah (Ghana Integrity Initiative) and Harriet Nuamah Agyemang (Country Director of SEND Ghana).

== See also ==
- Sustainable Development Goals
- National Development Planning Commission (Ghana)
- Sustainable Development Goals and Ghana

== General references ==
- "CSOs Platform lauds government on SDG progress". Ghana Business News. 7 September 2018.
- "Advisory bodies can help implement the SDGs if they coordinate with all actors". Development and Cooperation (D+C). 25 April 2023.
