= Media Foundation for West Africa =

International NGO based in Accra

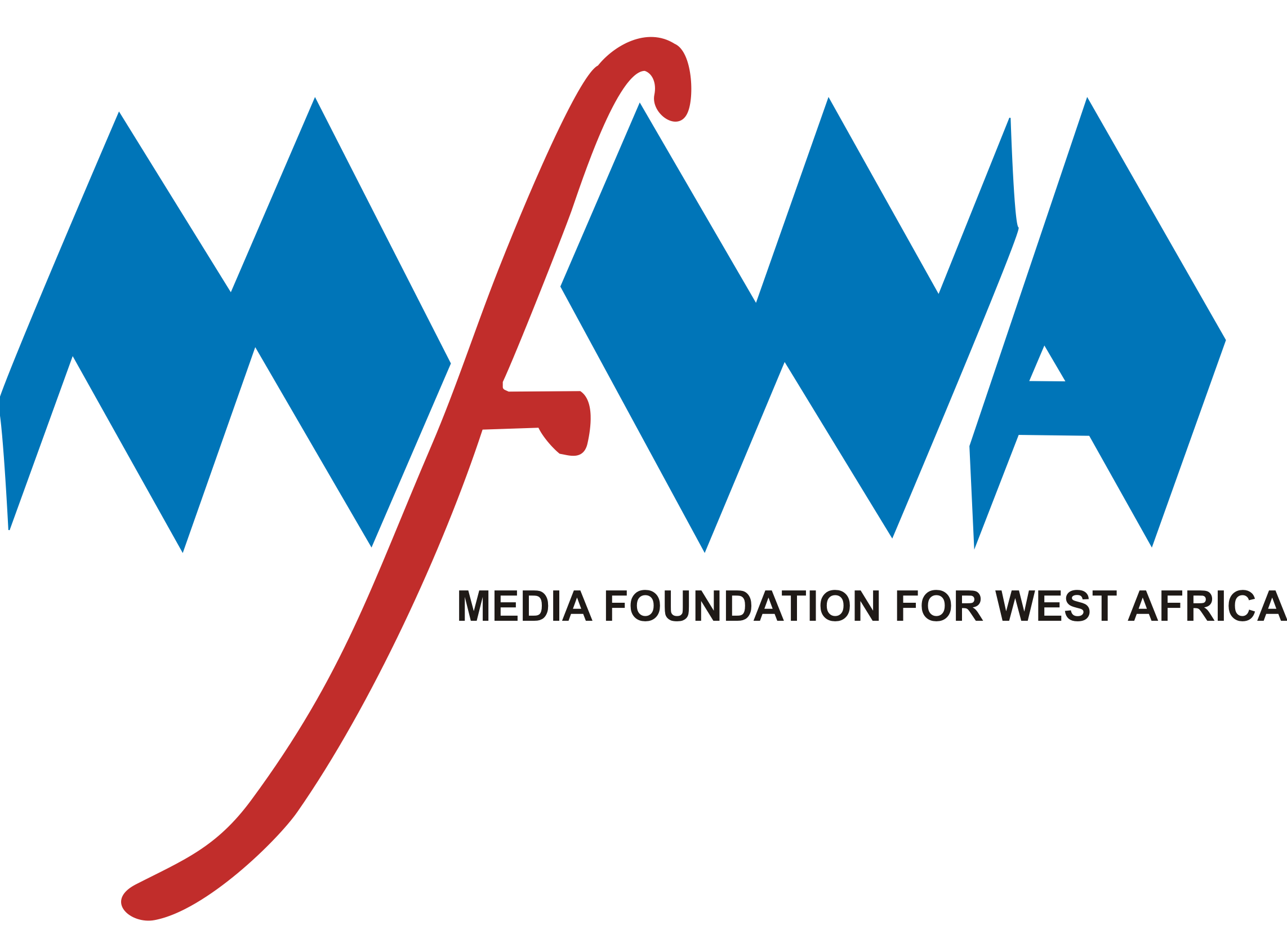
- Formation: March 20, 1997; 29 years ago
- Headquarters: Accra, Ghana
- Founder: Professor Kwame Karikari
- Website: https://mfwa.org/

The Media Foundation for West Africa (MFWA) is an international non-governmental organisation based in Accra, Ghana, and was founded in 1997. The MFWA is a regional independent non-governmental organization. It is the biggest and most influential media development, and freedom of expression advocacy organisation in West Africa with national partner organisations in all 16 countries of the region. The MFWA is also the Secretariat of the Continental Network of the most Prominent Free Expression and Media Development Organisations in Africa, known at the Africa Freedom of Expression Exchange (AFEX) Network. It campaigns against violations and attacks on freedom of expression and promotes freedom of the press in West Africa. Kwame Karikari is the founder of the organization.

== Report ==
In 2017, the organization issued a report on the accessibility of women to social media and their online rights. It was launched in Accra. The Government of Ghana was claimed to have committed to encouraging the mentorship and interaction of women to ICT issues.

== Support ==
In 2016, MFWA collaborated with the rep of UNDP in Ghana to train journalists on SDGs and how they can report on the achievement of the goals.

In 2017, MFWA launched a funding project to assist journalists in Ghana in accessing information and generating reports on SDGs. The UNDP supported the scheme in the aim of the journalists playing their role in achieving the goals by educating citizens.

In 2020, MFWA in collaboration with the Embassy of Netherlands in Ghana, organized a workshop for female individuals to improve the rights of women online in the country. About 120 females were trained on how to use social media sites to create awareness on their rights in Ghana. Ladies from Greater Accra, Volta, Eastern, Ashanti, Bono, and Northern regions in Ghana benefited from the training.

The organization also launched a framework to improve the relations between the Ghana Police Service and the media in Ghana. MFWA, the Administration of the Police and other media institutions put a document together. The document was said to be in response to the 'frosty' relationship that occurred between the police service and the media concerning attacks on some journalists.

== Projects ==
MFWA runs projects that are geared towards the development and enhancement of the capacities of media practitioners in West Africa. Some of their projects include:

- Fact-Check Ghana
- The Fourth Estate
- The Next Generation Investigative Journalism Fellowship (NGIJ)

== The West Africa Media Excellence Conference and Awards (WAMECA) ==
The Media Foundation for West Africa introduced this initiative to promote media excellence in the West African region. It includes a three-day conference and awards ceremony.

The conference brings together experts in media, governance, and democracy to discuss issues affecting media development and good governance across Africa.

The awards aim to recognise and inspire excellence in journalism and to honour West African journalists whose impactful work has contributed to positive change in society. The awards started in 2017.

In 2016, MFWA rewarded some journalists for reporting on SDGs. The journalists were Abdul Hameed Amponsah of Radio Peace in Winneba, Umaru Sanda Amadu of Citi FM in Accra, and Nina Abena Antwi-Kusi of TV3 Network also in Accra.

In 2024, MFWA was named winner for the Media and Information category at the 2024 World Justice Challenge for its accountability journalism project, The Fourth Estate.
