= Louis Jacques Filion =

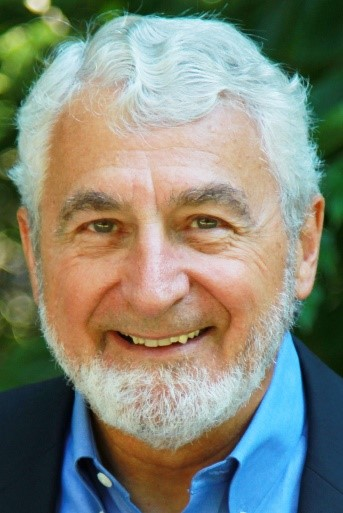
Louis Jacques Filion

Louis Jacques Filion (born 1945 in Trois-Rivières, Quebec) is a Canadian teacher and researcher in entrepreneurship. Working from systems theories, his interests focus on understanding the thinking structure underlying the design and implementation of innovative activity systems. He has studied agents of innovation, mainly entrepreneurs but also facilitators and intrapreneurs.

== Education ==
L.J. Filion obtained an M.A. in political science from the University of Ottawa (1974), an M.B.A. from HEC Montréal (1976), and a Ph.D. in systems and entrepreneurship under the supervision of Professor Peter Checkland at Lancaster University in Great Britain (1988).

== Career ==
L.J. Filion grew up in a family that was heavily involved with MSMEs (micro, small and medium-sized enterprises). Early in his career he held a number of management positions (1968 -1980), mainly in operations, human resources and marketing, in a variety of sectors including manufacturing (Reynolds Metals- Alcoa), finance and real estate (Desjardins Trust), management consulting (Ernst & Young), and publishing (Sogides). As a professor of entrepreneurship and small business at the Université du Québec à Trois-Rivières - UQTR (1981 - 1993), he was appointed director of one of Canada's first Master's programs in small and medium-sized business management (1986 - 1989).

As a professor of entrepreneurship and new venture creation at HEC Montréal (1993-2016), he was the Director of the Rogers-J.-A.- Bombardier Chair of Entrepreneurship from 1995 until he retired in 2016.

== Specificities ==
L.J. Filion has always been committed to field research. Over the course of his career he conducted hundreds of interviews with entrepreneurs and other agents of innovation to map different aspects of the thinking processes underlying and supporting innovative activity. The data gathered from the interviews were used to produce more than 200 case histories of entrepreneurs and other agents of innovation. He has also been involved in numerous entrepreneurship education development projects in more than 15 countries including Brazil

== Books ==
- 1990 - Les entrepreneurs parlent. Cap Rouge, Québec, Éditions de l’entrepreneur.
- 1991 - Vision et relations: clefs du succès de l'entrepreneur. Cap Rouge, Québec, Éditions de l'entrepreneur.
- 1997 - 1999 - 2001 - Réaliser son projet d'entreprise. Montréal, Éditions Transcontinental, under the direction of (15 authors), 1st Ed., 1997; 2nd Ed., 1999; 3rd Ed., 2001.
- 1999 - Tintin, Minville, l'entrepreneur et la potion magique. Montréal, Fides.
- 1999 - Empreendedorismo: Ciência, Técnica e Arte. Brasilia, Instituto Euvaldo Lodi, CNI, IEL Nacional. with F. Dolabela, R. Brockhaus and P. Formica.
- 2000 - Boa Idéia! E Agora? - Plano de Negocio, o caminho seguro para criar a gerenciar sua empresa. São Paulo, Cultura Editores Associados, collective work (20 authors), with F. Dolabela.
- 2002 - Savoir entreprendre. Montréal, Presses de l’Université de Montréal.
- 2003 - L’essaimage d’entreprises. Vers de nouvelles pratiques entrepreneuriales. Montréal, Éditions Transcontinental, Presses HEC Montréal, with D. Luc and P.-A. Fortin.
- 2003 - 2005 - Pour une vision inspirante en milieu scolaire. Cap Rouge, QC.: Presses Inter Universitaires, 1st Ed. 2003; 2nd Ed., 2005.
- 2006 - Devenir entrepreneur. Des enjeux aux outils. Paris, Village Mondial (Pearson France), with A. Fayolle.
- 2007 - Management des PME. De la création à la croissance. Montréal, ERPI (Pearson); Paris, Pearson éducation France, under the direction of (24 authors), textbook.
- 2007 - Empreendedorismo de Base Tecnologica. Rio de Janeiro, Elsevier. With A. Cozzi, A., V. Judice and F. Dolabela.
- 2008 - Les représentations entrepreneuriales. Paris, Éditions ESKA, under the direction of (11 authors), with C. Bourion.
- 2010 - De l’intuition au projet d’entreprise, Montréal, Éditions Transcontinental, Foundation of Entrepreneurship Editions, Presses HEC Montréal, under the direction of (19 authors) with C. Ananou.
- 2010 - 2012 - Oser intraprendre. Ces champions qui font progresser les organisations et les sociétés. Cap Rouge, Québec, Presses Inter Universitaires, 1st ed., 2010; 2nd ed., 2012.
- 2011 - Administración de Pymes Emprender, dirigir y desarrollar empresas. Mexico, Pearson Mexico, under the direction of, (36 authors), with L. F. Cisneros Martinez, J. H. Mejia-Morelos, textbook.
- 2012 - La cognition entrepreneuriale. Méthodes de recherche. Paris, Éditions ESKA, under the direction of (17 authors), with C. Bourion, digital and paper versions.
- 2012 - Vocabulaire de la création d’entreprise par essaimage. Montréal, Presses de l’Université de Montréal, with D. Létourneau, digital and paper versions.
- 2012 - Réussir sa création d’entreprise. Sans business plan. Paris, Eyrolles, with C. Ananou and C. Schmitt, digital and paper versions.
- 2013 - Innover au féminin. Savoir se dépasser- Intraprendre. Québec: Presses de l’Université du Québec, digital and paper versions.
- 2015 - La croissance d’entreprise : vision, agilité et doigté. Montréal, Éditions JFD.
- 2015 - Croissance et soutiens à la croissance d’entreprise. Montréal, Éditions JFD, with M. Ibanescu, K. Joyal, P.-A. Julien, O. Kay. S. Mélançon.
- 2016 - Intrapreneuriat: s’initier aux pratiques innovantes. Montréal, Éditions JFD, with M.-G. Chirita.
- 2017 - Entreprendre et savoir s’entourer. Montréal, Éditions de l’Homme.
- 2017 - Artistes, créateurs et entrepreneurs. Montréal, Del Busso Éditeur, under the direction of (11 authors).
- 2023 - Vision, relations et imagination : clefs du succès de l’entrepreneur. Québec, Presses Inter Universitaires. 1ère éd. (1991) Vision et relations: clefs du succès de l'entrepreneur. Cap Rouge, QC, Éditions de l'entrepreneur; 2ième éd. 2023.
- 2023 - Cirque du Soleil : complicités innovantes, Montréal, Éditions JFD.
- 2023 - Agents of Innovation. Entrepreneurs – Facilitators – Intrapreneurs. Emerald Publishing.

== Awards/Recognitions ==
- 1989 - Best Paper Award - Third Canadian Conference on Entrepreneurial Studies, University of Calgary, September, 28–30. Filion, L. J. (1989) The Design of Your Entrepreneurial Learning System: Identify a Vision and Assess Your Relations System. Published in McKirdy, J.G.M. (Ed.) Proceedings of the Third Canadian Conference on Entrepreneurial Studies: 77–90.
- 2002 - The first two editions of this book both received the “Bestseller” award from the Fondation de l’entrepreneurship and the third edition received the 2002 Roger Charbonneau Award for the best educational textbook published in 2001 at HEC Montréal. Filion, L.J. Réaliser son projet d'entreprise. Montréal, Qc.: Éditions Transcontinental, 1997, 268 p.; 2nd Ed., 1999, 460 p.; 3rd Ed., 2001, collective, 566 p.
- 2003 - Best Paper Award. Menzies, T.V., Filion, L.J., Brenner, G.A., Elgie, S. (2003) A Study of Entrepreneurs’ Ethnic Involvement Utilizing Personal and Business Characteristics. 20th Annual CCSBE/CCPME Conference, University of Victoria, B.C., November 6–8. Published in the Proceedings.
- 2003 - Roger-Charbonneau Award – Best educational textbook of the year - HEC Montréal. Filion, L. J. (2002) Savoir entreprendre, Presses de l’Université de Montréal.
- 2004 - Lifetime Achievement Award - Canadian Council for Small Business and Entrepreneurship (CCSBE), for his overall contribution to entrepreneurship. Award presented at the annual Canadian conference - November - Regina, Saskatchewan.
- 2005 - Wilford L. White Fellow of the International Council for Small Business (ICSB), for his contributions to the advancement of entrepreneurship in the world; Ronald Reagan Building and International Trade Office, Washington DC, June.
- 2006 - Julien-Marchesnay Award presented by the Association internationale de recherche en entrepreneuriat et PME (AIREPME) for the scope of his work on entrepreneurship and for his international outreach in the area of entrepreneurial culture. Award presented at the international conference - October – HEG – Haute école de gestion/School of Management - Fribourg, Suisse.
- 2006 - Certificate of Recognition ... “for his commitment to French-speaking academia …”. The Scientific Council of the Agence universitaire de la Francophonie (AUF), in Paris, Sorbonne, on December 16, Professor Louis Jacques Filion was awarded the honorary title of AUF expert scientific collaborator.
- 2007 - Emeritus Graduate, Séminaire Saint-Joseph de Trois-Rivières, Québec. Ceremony held on March 16.
- 2007 - Prix Advancia. “One of the best entrepreneurship books published in 2006 in France.” Paris Book Fair / January. Fayole, A. and L.J. Filion (2006) Devenir entrepreneur: des enjeux aux outils, Paris: Éditions Village Mondial, (Pearson France), 267p.
- 2008 - François-Albert-Angers Award for the Best textbook published in management in French in Canada in 2007. Filion, L.J. (Ed.) (2007) Management des PME. De la création à la croissance. Montréal: ERPI (Pearson); Paris: Pearson éducation France, 566 p.
- 2008 - Best Paper Award. International Council for Small Business, ICSB World Conference, Halifax, Nova Scotia, Canada, June 22–25. Borges, C., L. J. Filion and G. Simard (2008) Particularités du processus de création d’entreprises par des femmes. Published in the Proceedings.
- 2008 - Entrepreneurship Promotion Award “in recognition of his career-long commitment to promoting the entrepreneurial culture among youth”. This prestigious award given by the Chambers of Trade of Québec and the Government of Québec was presented by the Premier of Québec at the 28th Mercuriades, Gala held on April 9, at Montreal's Convention Centre.
- 2009 - Advancia Award for the Best theoretical essay in entrepreneurship published in France in 2008. Paris Book Fair/ January. Filion, L. J. and C. Bourion (Eds.) (2008) Les représentations entrepreneuriales. Paris: Éditions ESKA, 262 p.
- 2015 - Alma Lepage Award, Best case study of a woman, awarded by the HEC Montréal Case Centre. Dallaire, G. and L. J. Filion (2016) Geneviève Salbaing et l’histoire des Ballets Jazz de Montréal: savoir danser au rythme du temps. Revue internationale de cas en gestion (RICG), 14 (2), (9- 40-2015-022) (digital journal).
- 2015 - Jean Guertin Award for Excellence in Teaching (Career Award), HEC Montréal.
- 2016 - Honorary Professor, HEC Montréal.
- 2018 - Emeritus Professor, HEC Montréal.
- 2019 - ACHIEVEMENT AWARD presented at the Centre des nouvelles industries et technologies – CNTI, Paris, December 3, for an influential contribution to the RIPCO journal. For the following paper, in recognition of its impact on the community of management science researchers and its contribution to knowledge in the field of organizational behaviour: Filion, L. J. (2008) Les représentations entrepreneuriales, un champ d'étude en émergence. In: Revue Internationale de Psychosociologie et de Gestion des Comportements Organisationnels (RIPCO), Filion, L. J. and C. Bourion (Eds.) Les représentations entrepreneuriales, Vol. XIV, no. 32, 13–43. Paris: Éditions ESKA. «…Re-edition of your paper, chosen from the most influential papers published in RIPCO.” Re-published: Special “anniversary” issue, RIPCO (2019), Volume XXV, 75–99. Paris, Édition ESKA.
- 2022 - First winner of the ANEGEPE award (Associaçao Nacional de Estudos em Empreendedorismo e Gestao de Pequenas Empresas) for his major contributions to entrepreneurship in Brazil.
- 2023 - Doctorate Honoris Causa from the Université du Québec à Trois-Rivières (UQTR), Canada, June 12, 2023.
- 2024 – ICSB Global Excellence Award presented by the International Council for Small Business (ICSB) on June 28, 2024, in Fribourg, Switzerland.
- 2025 - Distinguished Member of Québec Order of excellence in education “ for his contribution to the quality of Québec Education System “, Ministère de l’Enseignement supérieur, Ministère de l’Éducation (June 10, 2025), Québec, Canada.
