= FactSpace West Africa =

- Type: Non-profit organization
- Industry: Journalism
- Founded: 2019; 7 years ago
- Headquarters: Ghana, Accra, The Gambia, Nigeria, Sierra Leone and Liberia.
- Number of locations: 5 countries
- Area served: West Africa
- Key people: Rabiu Alhassan (Managing Editor/Director)
- Services: Fact checking
- Website: factspace.org

FactSpace West Africa is a non-profit social enterprise dedicated to independent fact-checking, disinformation mapping, and promoting information integrity in West Africa. They are a signatory to the International Fact-Checking Network (IFCN) Code of Principles which regulates how they work.

== History ==
FactSpace West Africa was launched in 2019 by Ghanaian journalist Rabiu Alhassan, the organisation is currently leading fact-checking initiatives in five countries in the subregion, including Ghana, Nigeria, Liberia, The Gambia and Sierra Leone.

FactSpace West Africa combats the weaponisation of misinformation and disinformation by:

- Fact-checking to counter false narratives.
- Researching information ecosystems and the actors behind information disorder.
- Educating journalists and the public through media information literacy training.
- Developing digital tools to fight the spread of false information.

On 2 April 2020, FactSpace West Africa became a signatory to the International Fact-Checking Network (IFCN) Code of Principles.

=== Partnerships ===
FactSpace West Africa has collaborated with organisations including the World Health Organization, UNESCO, UNICEF, Meta, Meedan, ECOWAS, USAID, Africa Check, the Google News Initiative, DW Akademie, Fact-Check Ghana and the IFCN, among other international NGOs, to strengthen information resilience.

== Work ==
In 2024, during the Ghanaian elections, FactSpace West Africa in collaboration with Fact-Check Ghana, Dubawa and other organizations created the Ghana fact-checking coalition to combat misinformation.

== See also ==
- List of common misconceptions
- Fact-checking – Process of verifying information in non-fictional text
