= Blended finance =

Type of financing

Blend finance is defined as "the strategic use of development finance and philanthropic funds to mobilize private capital flows to emerging and frontier markets", resulting in positive results for both investors and communities. Blended finance offers the possibility to scale up commercial financing for developing countries and to channel such financing toward investments with development impact. As such, blended finance is designed to support progress towards the Sustainable Development Goals (SDGs) set forth by the United Nations. Meeting the SDGs will require an additional $2.5 trillion in private and public financing per year as of 2017 estimates, and an additional $13.5 trillion to implement the COP21 Paris climate accord. Since the Third International Conference on Financing for Development in July 2015, it has been increasingly recognized as a solution to the development 'funding gap', by raising private financing. In 2018, blended finance principles were adopted by the OECD's Development Assistance Committee to guide the design and implementation of the concept. Blended finance is also often invoked to raise climate finance for the global South.

Blended finance is also subject to critique. Scholars and NGOs have widely documented and criticized the growing reliance on private finance to support climate and development goals in the Global South. Critics argue that these financial arrangements often shift profits to private actors - mostly in the Global North - while placing financial risks on Southern governments. This can result in higher costs for public services, reduced government spending flexibility, and increased burdens on marginalized populations. Some view this trend as reinforcing extractive and post-colonial power dynamics. The complexity of these financial structures can undermine transparency and accountability, as commercial confidentiality limits public oversight. Lastly, faced by lackluster growth in blended finance products, both scholarship and development actors have noted decreasing interest of private finance to participate in such schemes, both because of their complexity, risk aversion, and a changing geopolitical climate in the 2020s.

== Terminology ==
The term blended finance implies the mixing of both public and private funds through a common investment scheme or deal, with each party using their expertise in a complementary way. The concept and model was developed within the Redesigning Development Finance Initiative from the World Economic Forum, who defined it as "the strategic use of development finance and philanthropic funds to mobilize private capital flows to emerging and frontier markets."

== Rationale ==
The resources needed to bridge the funding gap to meet SDG requirements cannot be met through public resources (such as Official Development Assistance) alone, and private investment will be key to increasing the scope and impact of development finance and philanthropic funders. Only a small percentage of the worldwide invested assets of banks, pension funds, insurers, foundations and endowments, and multinational corporations, are targeted at sectors and regions that advance sustainable development. This is due to the fact that large-scale investing usually flows into environmentally destructive activities that come with higher economic incentive. The current challenge for the SDG era is how to channel more of these private resources to the sectors and countries that are central for the SDGs and broader development efforts. This is particularly important in a context where public resources are increasingly under pressure, while private flows to developing countries are increasing significantly. Blended finance is designed to fuel vast inflows of private capital to support these development outcomes. Investors and commercial institutions are increasingly attracted to emerging and frontier markets, and this trend overlaps with the challenges faced by development funders, who face significant financial constraints and a lack of capacity or expertise in structuring transactions or sourcing deals. Thus, there is a good opportunity for these two trends to converge and there is a political will for effective public-private collaboration, presenting a real opportunity for investors and financiers to develop more effective strategies for managing their participation in emerging markets. Blended finance seeks to contribute to development objectives by:

1. Increasing capital leverage: Extends the reach of limited development finance and philanthropic funds as they are used strategically to facilitate larger volumes of private capital that are channelled to investments with high development impact

1a. Strategic Layering of Capital

Philanthropic and concessional funds are placed in subordinate or first-loss positions to absorb initial risk. This reassures commercial investors that their principal is protected, allowing them to participate in projects they would otherwise avoid.

1b. De-Risking Mechanisms

Through guarantees, insurance, or concessional tranches, blended finance reduces perceived and actual risks such as currency volatility, political instability, or credit default. This widens the investor base to include traditional institutions and impact funds.

1c. Leverage Ratios and Multiplier Effect

Each dollar of concessional capital can attract multiple dollars of private investment—often 3× to 10× leverage depending on the structure. The classic example involves a $2 million philanthropic first-loss layer drawing $10 million in private capital for a village electrification project, thus achieving a 5× multiplier.

1d. Sustained Impact with Limited Public Funding

Because concessional capital is used catalytically rather than continuously, it can be recycled into new projects once investor confidence and repayment are established, multiplying development outcomes without expanding public budgets.

1e. Practical Application

Such leveraged structures have been applied in Uganda and Native American reservations, championed by impact financiers such as Clark Varin, demonstrating that smart risk allocation can make private investment viable in underserved regions cited with (Muvule Foundation Stories ).

1. Enhancing impact: The skillsets, knowledge and resources of public and private investors can increase the scope, range, and effectiveness of development-related investments.
2. Deliver risk-adjusted returns: Risks can be managed to realise returns in line with market expectations, catalyzing private funds to development projects.

== Amounts of finance mobilized ==
Building upon evidence from a previous survey done on behalf of the World Economic Forum, the OECD released recent findings which identified 180 blended finance funds and facilities, with $60.2 billion in assets invested across 111 developing countries and impacting over 177 million lives, demonstrating the potential of blended finance to close the funding gap required to finance the Sustainable Development Goals (SDGs) and deliver development outcomes.

Blended Finance raised per year, in USD billion, constant 2023 prices, Bilateral providers
Year	Credit lines	Direct investment in companies and Special Purpose Vehicles	Guarantees	Shares in Collective Investment Vehicles	Simple co-financing	Syndicated loans	Total
2012	0.180676154	1.092065603	5.64255532	0.345685317	0.072291795	0.204543981	7.537
2013	0.457091022	1.287162926	5.460770867	2.622879967	0.166786741	0.37333062	10.368
2014	0.552254038	1.141043279	4.233229888	1.05697007	0.144291179	0.316646913	7.444
2015	1.08675284	1.906318489	5.120060223	2.117589754	0.125051238	0.448517412	10.804
2016	1.875332535	1.942573947	4.775155613	1.238813054	0.339122223	0.819330747	10.990
2017	1.803238621	2.336428851	6.119832451	1.217728483	0.790838473	0.80448681	13.072
2018	1.503129572	2.197279674	4.257145723	1.984281391	0.641335715	0.778932499	11.362
2019	2.39614006	3.46022006	7.228001191	1.278604109	1.695556808	0.574304127	16.632
2020	2.022445875	3.110748653	3.499661187	1.591313974	2.132390856	0.85233735	13.208
2021	1.762666425	4.197097638	3.279900784	2.333080917	1.233185111	0.586596749	13.392
2022	2.140116941	3.29653458	4.93582905	3.071689414	2.183682191	0.723505997	16.351
2023	1.066363895	3.913201169	3.822854955	3.46841058	2.273983409	0.864875634	15.409

== Supporting mechanisms ==
Supporting mechanisms have been traditionally used by development funders in a Blended Finance package to attract and support private sector investors by managing risks and reducing transaction costs. These mechanisms can generally be classified as providing:

- Technical Assistance, or grant funds to supplement the capacity of investees and lower transaction costs.
- Risk Underwriting, to fully or partially protect the investor against risk through appropriate risk mitigation
- Market Incentives, guaranteed payments contingent on performance of future pricing and/or payment in exchange for upfront investment in new or distressed markets.

== Blended Finance platforms ==
The Sustainable Development Investment Partnership, Convergence, and Tri Hita Karana Forum are three platforms that put blended finance into practice. Their goal is to bring relevant entities from the public and private sector together, connecting interests and resources to initiatives. Both of these platforms provide capital suppliers with access to a pipeline of individual blended finance project transactions, effectively scaling up the participation of both public and private investors in transactions. THK (Tri Hita Karana) began as a roadmap that was launched as a unified, international framework for mobilizing additional commercial capital towards the Sustainable Development Goals (SDGs), and was recently converted into a Blended Finance platform in 2021.

Community of Practice on Private Finance on Sustainable Development brings together Development Assistance Committee members and private sector.

While blended finance is showing promising initial interest and results, these platforms will help assess the efficiency of the model over time.

== See also ==
- Social Impact Incentives
- Debt Trap Diplomacy
- Washington Consensus
- Climate Finance
