= Fact-Check Ghana =

Fact checking project under the MFWA

- Type: Non-profit organization
- Industry: Journalism
- Founded: July 2016; 10 years ago
- Headquarters: Accra, Ghana
- Area served: Ghana
- Key people: Kwaku Krobea Asante (Editor/Team lead)
- Services: Fact checking
- Website: www.fact-checkghana.com

Fact-Check Ghana is a non-profit fact-checking project under the Media Foundation for West Africa (MFWA). The first fact-checking project in Ghana was set up to promote fact-based public discourse, especially in the media landscape that has seen a significant increase in internet access. Fact-Check Ghana is headquartered in Accra and operates in the same newsroom with MFWA's investigative journalism project, The Fourth Estate. Fact-Check Ghana is a signatory to International Fact-Checking Network (IFCN) principles

== History ==
Fact-Check Ghana was established in 2016 to address the spread of misinformation, disinformation and malinformation by newsmakers during that year's Ghanaian election. Since then, it has become one of the key fact-checking organizations in Ghana, verifying claims made by newsmakers. Kwaku Krobea Asante has been the team lead and editor since the inception of the project.

== Works ==
Fact-Check Ghana verifies pictures and videos suspected of containing falsehoods or misleading statements. Their work spans various categories, including politics, health, social issues, elections, and the economy. Producing reports in English and other Ghanaian languages including Twi, Ga, Hausa, and Ewe, among others

Fact-Check Ghana also conduct information literacy and fact-checking training to journalists and media practitioners in Ghana. Some of their notable works includes:

- Half-naked photo of "Akufo-Addo" and "Serwaa Broni" in a room forensically fact-checked
- Paa Kwesi Schandorf is NOT the 2023 Komla Dumor Award winner – BBC clarifies
- Fake! Documentary implicating Bawumia in Bawku Conflict unfounded
- Did the NPP lose parliamentary seats in 2020 elections because they fought Galamsey?
- Free SHS: NPP's claim over 5 million students have benefited from policy false

=== Partnership ===
Fact-Check Ghana in partnership with two fact-checking organisations which include Dubawa, FactSpace West Africa and other civil society organisations working on information hygiene, integrity and resilience in Ghana have formed the Ghana Fact-Checking Coalition.

The Coalition was established to tackle information disorder in the lead-up to Ghana's 2024 Presidential and Parliamentary elections. Its goal is to create a collaborative and coordinated effort to counter the serious threat posed by misinformation and disinformation.

== Controversy ==
Kow Essuman, the legal counsel to President Nana Akufo-Addo, denied a Fact-Check Ghana's report claiming the president misled the country by stating that the World Health Organization (WHO) ranked Ghana among the top countries for managing the COVID-19 pandemic.

== See also ==
- Fact-checking – Process of verifying information in non-fictional text
- List of common misconceptions
