= Sustainable Development Investment Partnership =

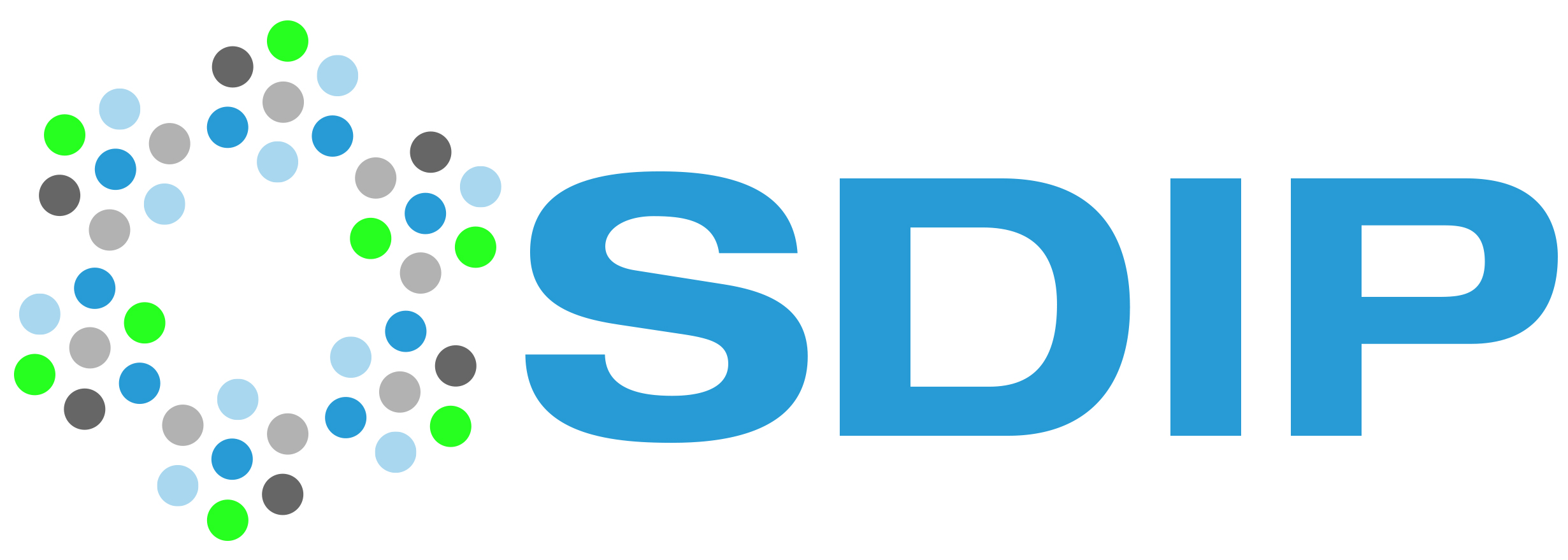
Sustainable Development Investment Partnership

The Sustainable Development Investment Partnership (SDIP) is an international public-private partnership which aims to use blended finance to support sustainable infrastructure investments in developing countries. The SDIP thus brings together public, private and philanthropic entities to work towards the Sustainable Development Goals (SDGs) set out by the United Nations. The SDIP was launched at the United Nations Conference on Financing for Development in Addis Ababa in July 2015 with 20 founding members, which has since risen to 42. The World Economic Forum and OECD were founding partners and provide institutional support. SDIP's inaugural meeting took place in Geneva, Switzerland on 15 September 2015.

== Activities ==
The SDIP was set up to help coordinate financing for sustainable development. The SDIP uses blended finance, creating a platform where public and private entities can co-invest and coordinate on specific projects. The partnership's public goal is to provide 100 billion dollars per year of additional finance over five years. SDIP aims to support inclusive growth and poverty alleviation through investments in water and sanitation systems, transportation, clean energy, agriculture, health, telecommunications, climate adaptation, and other areas.

== Membership ==
SDIP has 42 members. The partnership is open to governments, local and global private banks, institutional investors and other public and private financiers, development finance institutions and bilateral and multilateral development banks and other organizations seeking to providing resources to support the various activities of the partnership. Some members include:

- Bill & Melinda Gates Foundation
- Government of Canada
- Citigroup
- Government of Denmark
- Development Bank of South Africa (DBSA)
- Deutsche Bank
- European Investment Bank (EIB)
- European Bank for Reconstruction and Development (EBRD)
- FMO
- French Development Agency (AFD)
- HSBC
- Inter-American Development Bank (IDB)
- International Finance Corporation (IFC)
- Investment Fund for Developing Countries (IFU)
- Japan International Cooperation Agency (JICA)
- Meridiam
- Multilateral Investment Guarantee Agency (MIGA)
- Government of the Netherlands
- Government of Norway
- Standard Chartered
- Storebrand
- Sumitomo Mitsui Banking Corporation (SMBC)
- Government of Sweden
- Government of the United Kingdom
- United States Agency for International Development (USAID)

== Regional hubs ==
As an organisation focused on bridging funding gaps towards the SDGs, a large share of SDIP-funded projects are located in Sub-Saharan Africa; of the $30 billion projects worldwide, over $20 billion are located across the continent. Consequently, the partnership has established an African hub to build local capacity and share best practice across its network of institutions.

An ASEAN hub was also launched in 2017.

== See also ==
- Blended finance
