= Information integrity =

Policy concept concerning the maintenance of a healthy information ecosystem

Information integrity is a policy concept referring to the accuracy, consistency, and reliability of information, and more broadly to the health of the information ecosystems through which the public accesses it. Since the early 2020s the term has been adopted by intergovernmental bodies, including the United Nations, the OECD, and the European Union, as a framing for policy responses to misinformation, disinformation, and hate speech online, particularly in the context of generative artificial intelligence and declining public trust in institutions.

The term is derived from an earlier, narrower usage in information security, where "information integrity" (frequently used interchangeably with data integrity) refers to protecting stored or transmitted data from unauthorised alteration or corruption. Kamya Yadav and Samantha Lai have argued that this origin has left the newer, policy-oriented usage under-specified, and have proposed their own six-component definition—accuracy, consistency, reliability, fidelity, safety, and transparency—as a way to give the term the precision needed to guide coordinated policy action.

Advocates of the framework have presented it as a response to several converging pressures on the information environment: the accelerating volume and realism of content produced by generative artificial intelligence, algorithmic amplification of engaging but not necessarily accurate content, and a broader, measured decline in public trust in governments, media, and other institutions. UN Secretary-General António Guterres stated at the launch that "when information integrity is targeted, so is democracy—which depends on a shared, fact-based perception of reality."

== Institutional frameworks ==
=== United Nations ===
In September 2023, the governments of Canada and The Netherlands launched a Global Declaration on Information Integrity Online, endorsed by 33 more UN Member States and "grounded in international law, in particular human rights treaties, as the foundation of good governance that transcends borders, promotes equality and freedom of expression and the media". UN Secretary-General António Guterres launched the United Nations Global Principles for Information Integrity on 24 June 2024, a year after an earlier UN report had examined information integrity on digital platforms. The Global Principles set out five areas for action: societal trust and resilience; independent, free, and pluralistic media; healthy incentives; transparency and research; and public empowerment. Guterres framed the initiative as resting on human-rights obligations, asserting that everyone should be able to freely express themselves without fear of attack while accessing a wide range of views and information.

=== OECD ===
The OECD published the report Facts not Fakes: Tackling Disinformation, Strengthening Information Integrity in 2024, proposing a policy framework built on transparency, societal resilience, and institutional governance measures. The OECD Council subsequently adopted a Recommendation on Information Integrity, incorporating earlier OECD development-cooperation principles on media and the information environment. The Global Forum for Media Development, a civil-society network that contributed to the drafting process, described the Recommendation as the first international soft-law instrument specifically addressing information integrity. The Recommendation itself cautions that policy interventions must be lawful, proportionate, and compliant with human-rights obligations, and warns that governments can themselves undermine information integrity through their own actions.

=== European Union ===
Within the EU institutions, the European External Action Service (EEAS) houses a division combining information integrity with countering foreign information manipulation and interference (FIMI), reflecting EU usage in which information integrity work and counter-disinformation work are treated as closely linked. The European Parliamentary Research Service has connected this work to the European Commission's proposed "European Democracy Shield," building on the earlier European Democracy Action Plan. A separate multilateral Global Declaration on Information Integrity Online, hosted online by the Government of Canada, defines the term as "an information ecosystem that produces accurate, trustworthy, and reliable information," explicitly framed to encompass a plurality of views rather than a single sanctioned account of events.

== Relationship to other concepts ==
"Information integrity" is generally used to describe a positive, aspirational state of a healthy information ecosystem, in contrast to terms that describe specific harms to that ecosystem: disinformation (false information spread deliberately to deceive) and misinformation (false information spread without intent to deceive). Institutional usage of "information integrity" typically treats these two, alongside hate speech, as the principal threats the concept is meant to counter. This distinction, together with a third category, malinformation (accurate information disseminated to cause harm), was popularised by researchers Claire Wardle and Hossein Derakhshan in a 2017 report for the Council of Europe, which classified the three along two axes: the veracity of the content and the intent to cause harm.

Wardle has since questioned the continued adequacy of this classification: in a 2023 essay, she argued that a research and policy focus on classifying the truth-value of individual pieces of content had displaced attention from the narratives that shape why and how people share information, and that the three-part distinction had become less useful for understanding actual sharing behaviour online. Yet, in her report from mid-2024, commissioned by the UN Department of Peace Operations and the UN Office of the Special Adviser on the Prevention of Genocide, Wardle argues that while "information integrity" is useful for defining what a society or international organisation strives to protect, practitioners and policymakers must maintain strict conceptual distinction between misinformation, disinformation, and hate speech when monitoring content, drafting laws, designing platform policies, or responding in high-risk conflict settings.

The term is also distinct from the older, narrower use of the same phrase in information security and data integrity, which concerns the technical accuracy and unaltered state of digital records rather than the reliability of an information ecosystem as a whole.

== Wikipedia and information integrity ==
The Wikimedia Foundation, that hosts all Wikimedia projects including Wikipedia, has described Wikipedia's community-led model of content creation and dispute resolution—reliant on volunteer deliberation, transparent edit histories, and citation to verifiable sources—as a distinctive response to information integrity threats, in contrast to platforms that rely on centralised or automated content moderation. The Foundation has identified coordinated editing campaigns by state and non-state actors, and organised efforts to discredit Wikipedia's perceived reliability, as recurring threats to this model, and has argued that regulation aimed at large commercial platforms can unintentionally burden Wikimedia's volunteer-run, non-profit structure if applied without regard for its differences from advertising-funded social media. The Foundation has also noted that Wikipedia's role as a training source for large language models raises the stakes of preserving the reliability of its content, since degraded Wikipedia content could propagate into AI systems trained on it.

== See also ==
- Disinformation – Deliberately misleading information
- Misinformation – Incorrect or misleading information
- Data integrity – Maintenance of data over its entire life-cycle
- Media literacy – Ability to navigate media
- Fact-checking – Process of verifying information in non-fictional text
- Foreign information manipulation and interference – Propaganda and disinformation tactic
