= Sustainable Development Goals and Ghana =

Set of 17 global development goals defined by the United Nations for the year 2030

- Mission statement: "A blueprint to achieve a better and more sustainable future for all by 2030"
- Commercial?: No
- Type of project: Non-Profit
- Location: Global
- Owner: Supported by United Nations & Owned by community
- Founder: United Nations
- Established: 2015
- Website: sdgs.un.org

The Sustainable Development Goals and Ghana describes how the Sustainable Development Goals are being implemented in Ghana. The SDGs are also known as the 2030 Agenda for Sustainable Development and are a set of seventeen global goals for 169 specific areas developed by the United Nations. The Sustainable Development Goals were formed in Rio de Janeiro in 2012 at the UN Conference on Sustainable Development. Its aimed to produce a set of universal goals claimed to meet the urgent environmental, economic and political problems facing the world.

Ghana aims to align its development priorities in partnership with CSOs and the private sector to achieve the SDGs in Ghana together.

== Background ==
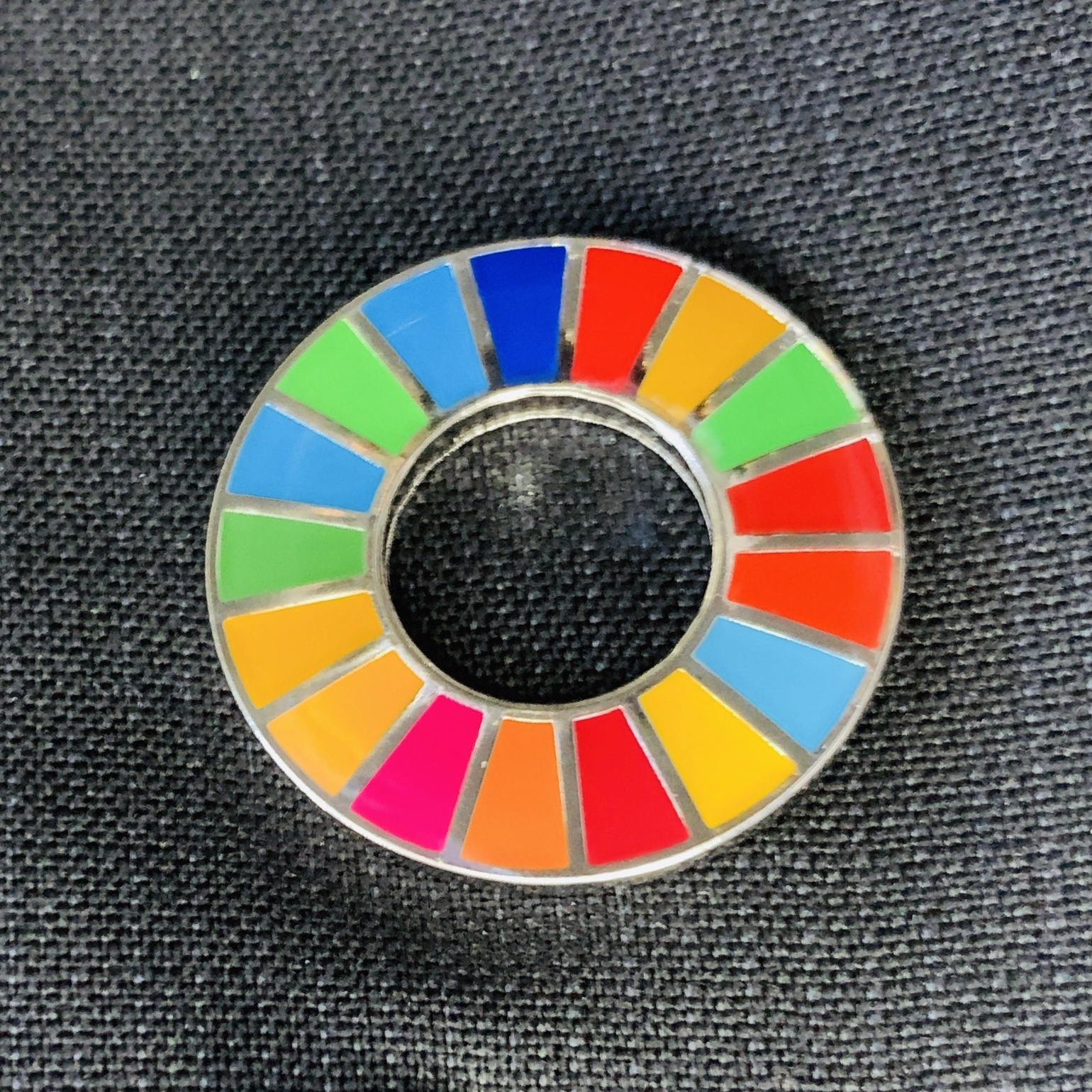
Sustainable Development Goals in Ghana

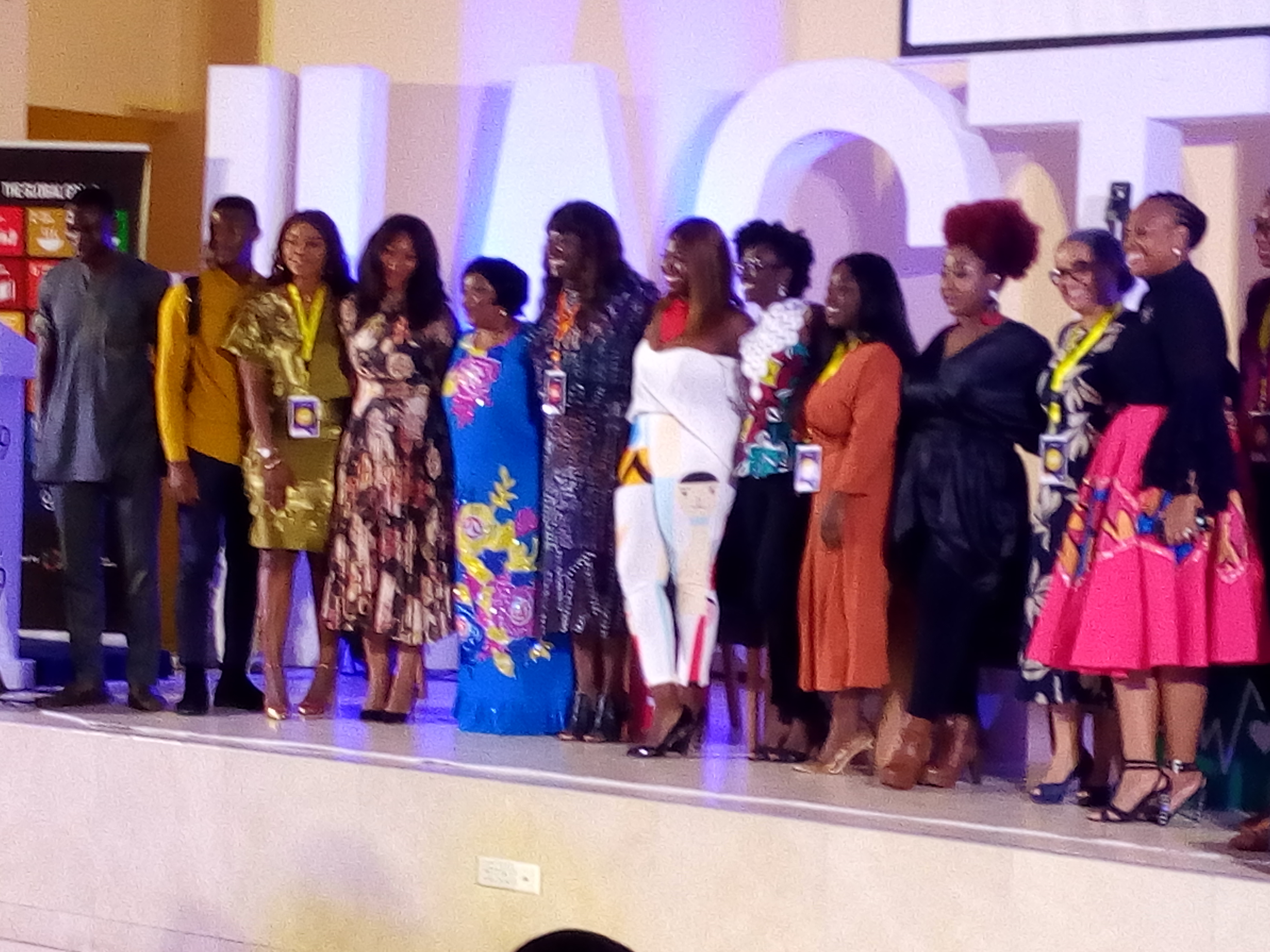
SDG Meeting in Ghana (capacity Building and knowledge sharing using the SDG)

The SDGs, also called the Global Goals, are a universal call to action to end poverty, protect the planet and ensure that everyone enjoys peace and prosperity by 2030. It was adopted by 193 countries, with Ghana inclusive. The SDGs came into effect in January 2016. Its objectives are to ensure social inclusion, protect the environment and foster economic growth. Governments, private sector, research, academia and CSOs receive support from the UN as the SDGs encourage partnerships. It ensures the right choices are adopted now to improve life for future generations in a sustainable way. The SDGs are interconnected.

According to the president Nana Akufo-Addo of Ghana, "We were the first country in sub-Saharan Africa to free ourselves from colonialism; we were the first sub-Saharan African country to achieve the goal of halving poverty, as contained in Goal 1 of the Millennium Development Goals; and we were the first country in Africa to eliminate trachoma,"

Ghana aims to align its development priorities in partnership with CSOs and the private sector to achieve the SDGs together. The Agenda 2030 is said to have five overarching themes, known as the five Ps, namely; People, Planet, Prosperity, Peace, and Partnerships, which span across the 17 SDGs.

== Activities ==
Ghana is working on all 17 goals.

=== Parliament Committee ===
The Speaker of Parliament of Ghana urged the parliament to form a seven-member Ad Hoc committee to monitor the country's progress on the Implementation of the SDGs.

=== Partnerships ===
The Ministry of Finance in Ghana in partnership with other organizations hosted a dialogue with some corporations in the country to drive the achievement of SDGs.

An initiative of the World Economic Forum called the Sustainable Development Investment Partnership partnered with the Government of Ghana and the UNDP to hold the first 'Ghana SDGs Country Financing Roadmap Roundtable' in Accra.

In November 2019, the Ministry of Finance partnered with other organizations to organize the Accra SDGs Investment Fair.

The Government of Ghana collaborated with other non-state actors to push the 2030 Agenda for SDG at the UN in New York.

The Government with the effort of the Ministry of Business Development in Ghana collaborated with other organizations and launched the post-COVID-19 business recovery initiative. This was in line to advance the UN SDGs and aimed at achieving those objectives. This was launched in Accra by the President Nana Akufo-Addo.

The Government together with the UN Office in the country launched a project towards the achievement of SDGs. This project was claimed to raise about $2.3 million over the two-year period from the SDG Fund. It was launched in Accra on 30 October 2020 by the UN Ghana Country Rep.

== Progress reports ==
=== Voluntary National Review 2019 ===
Ghana was part of the 2019 Voluntary Review of the High-Level Political Forum on Sustainable Development. The reviews were on:

- National Ownership
- Multi-stakeholder partnerships
- Awareness creation
- Progress of Implementation of the Goals
- Leave no one behind
- Synergies across the goals
- Institutional Arrangement
- Data

=== National SDGs Reports ===
In 2017, a publication suggested why each of the SDGs matters to everyone and what can be done to ensure successful implementation in Ghana.

In 2018, there was a report which served as a template for a series of yearly SDG-budgeting reports. Its reason was in threefolds.

In 2019, there was a report on how Ghana was developing a strategy for targeted SDGs tracking and budgeting and also involving the SDG Impact Investment ecosystem in the financing of the SDGs, four years into its implementation.

A coalition called for the redoubling of efforts to achieve the water and sanitation targets of the SDGs.

The CEO of GIPC claimed the center would incentivize companies who would help the country achieve the SDGs.

The CEO of the Private Enterprise Federation claimed Ghana has covered 14 out of the 17 goals and lauded the government for its commitment to achieving the SDGs.

The Communications Specialist at MoDB claimed the President of Ghana achieved a number of the SDGs such as SDG 2, SDG 3, SDG 4, SDG 6, SDG 7, SDG 8, SDG 9 and SDG 10.

In January 2021, the GSS published a report called the 'Multi-dimensional Poverty-Ghana'. In this report, a decline in the incidence of poverty and also extreme poverty was found. This made Ghana the first country in sub-Saharan Africa to "achieve the MDGs target of halving extreme poverty in 2006 way ahead of the global deadline of 2015".

== Challenges ==
=== COVID-19 pandemic and the SDGs ===
CSOs on SDGs called for measures to protect the vulnerable and the poor to cushion them against COVID-19 pandemic effects. The Ghana CSOs platform on SDGs worked closely with others to set up the CSO COVID-19 Response Committee to coordinate efforts of CSOs in the COVID-19 national emergency measures announced by the President of Ghana.

== Society and Culture ==
=== National SDGs advocates ===
The Ghanaian advocate of the SDGs in 2019/20 is President Nana Addo Dankwa Akufo-Addo, Co-chair of SDGs Advocates.

=== Other advocacy events ===
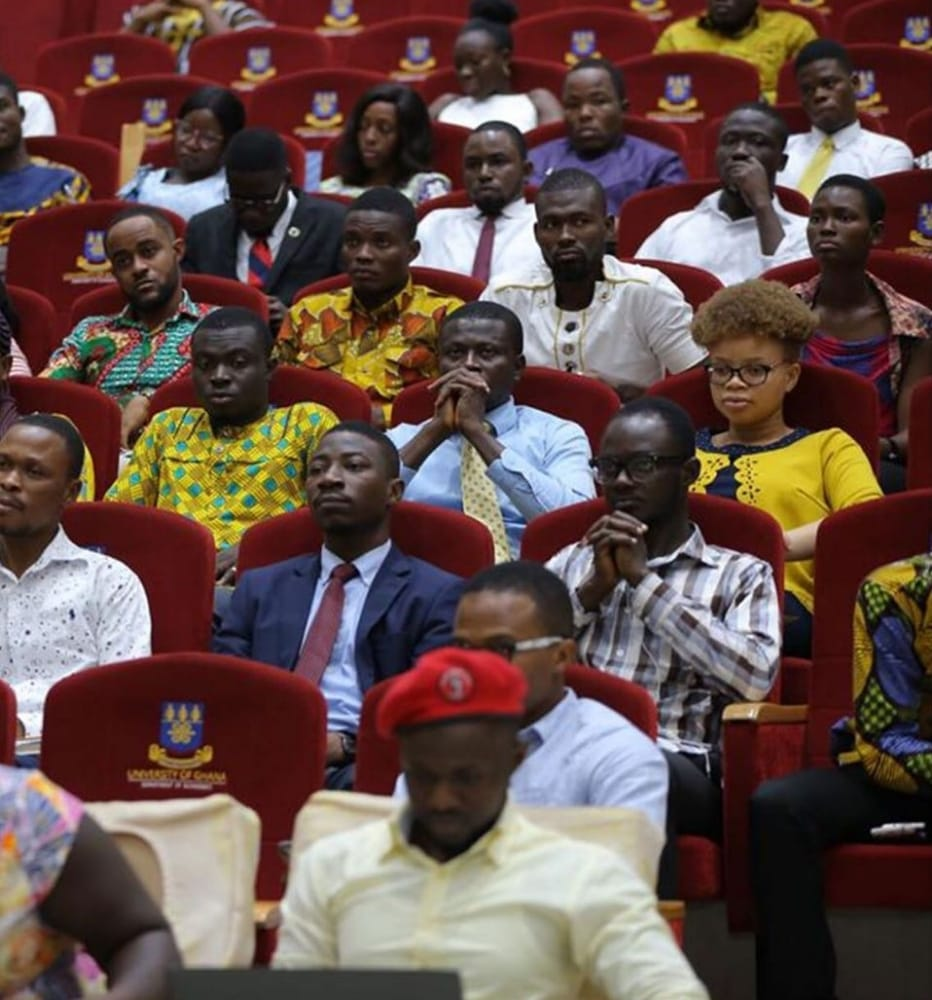
2020 Impact Summit at Bank of Ghana Auditorium, Accra

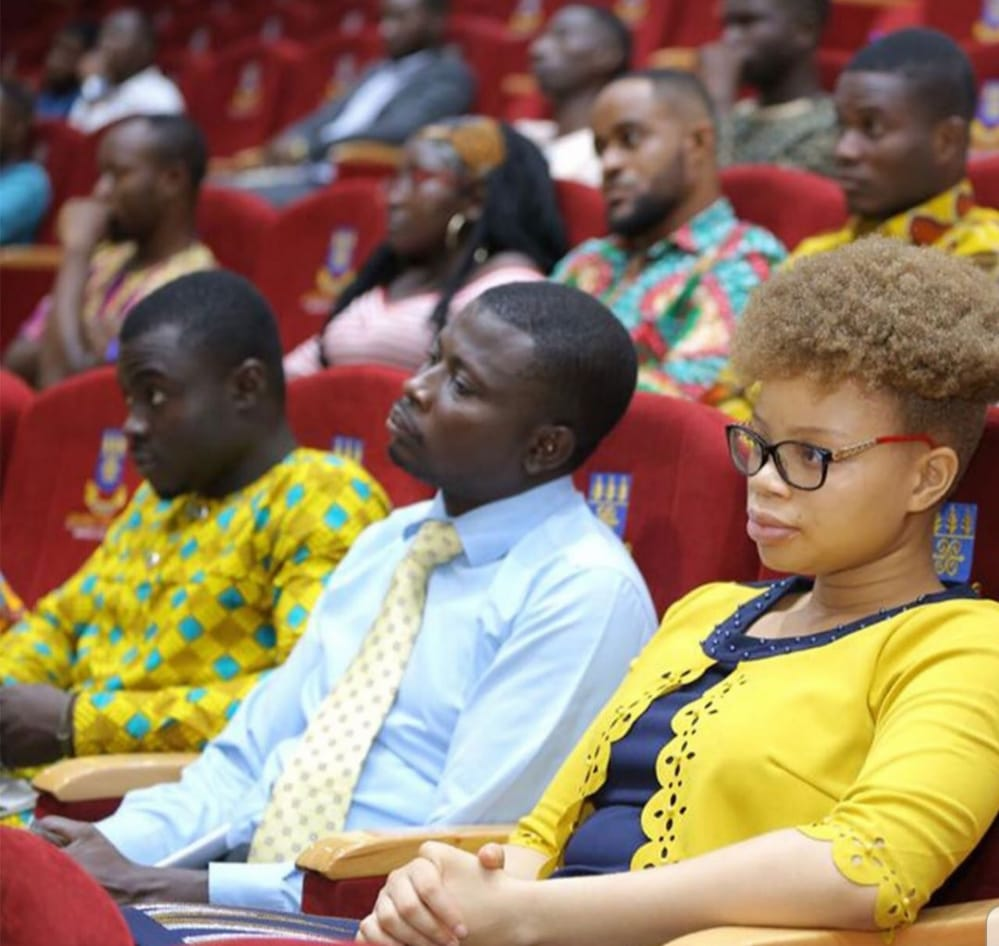
2020 Impact Summit at Bank of Ghana Auditorium, Accra

- In 2019, Ghana hosted over 1100 people from over 25 countries for the first-ever Africa's Global SDGs Youth Summit in Accra.
- The University of Education in Winneba signed a MoU with the MPA to enhance the achievement of SDGs in Ghana.
- On the World Tourism Day, a field trip, sightseeing, excursion, adventure, among others, which is planned, organized and hosted annually by the UNWTO is said to be hosted by a Ghanaian Private Sector Social Enterprise free of charge. This is for persons living with disabilities. It is relative to strengthening, promoting, and accelerating the achievement and maintenance of SDG 10, SDG 17, and SDG 9.
- In September 2020 World Maritime Day, the Director-General of the GMA made an address under the theme 'Sustainable Shipping for a Sustainable Planet' stated that it was part of the authority's plans to support UN to achieve the SDGs such as SDG3, SDG11, SDG13 and SDG14. He claimed, "This year's World Maritime Day is closely tied to the United Nations' 2030 Agenda for sustainable development that our world leaders pledged to support in 2015, and provides a unique opportunity to showcase the importance of the maritime sector to achieve the SDGs." It was undertaken to provide a platform to raise awareness of the SDGs and to also show what the IMO and its member states do in order to achieve these targets.
