= New Ventures =

Nonprofit program to generate a positive environmental and social change

- Formation: 1999; 27 years ago
- Founder: World Resources Institute
- Type: Nonprofit program
- Purpose: Help small businesses generate a positive environmental or social change
- Location: Mexico City, Mexico
- Region served: South and central America
- Services: Foster venture capital and impact investment ecosystems
- Official language: English, Spanish
- Partner: Rodrigo Villar
- Key people: Rodrigo Villar, Armando Laborde, Sebastian Welisiejko
- Funding: Grants and donations
- Website: www.nvgroup.org

New Ventures is a global program that provides services for the development of small and medium enterprises (SMEs) whose main goal is to generate a positive environmental or social change within their own communities using impact investing.

As of 2024, it has centres in Brazil, China, Colombia, India, Indonesia and Mexico. New Venture's reach varies in each country, but every Center offers free development services that provide SMEs with management tools and access to capital in order to make them grow and increase their positive impact. The project has assisted more than 600 enterprises worldwide.

== History ==
New Ventures were created in 1999 by the World Resources Institute, and it was established in emerging markets with a large biodiversity.

It established centres in a number of countries. The first was in 2000 in Mexico, where it established a centre with the support of the Fondo Mexicano para la Conservación de la Naturaleza. It is the centre that has grown the most and establishing itself as one of the leading accelerators in the country, and the main green business accelerator in Mexico. In 2002, it created New Ventures Brazil.

In 2005 it created New Ventures Indonesia in an alliance with Yayasan Bina Usaha Lingkungan, a local NGO that focuses on providing renewable energy to low income communities.

In 2006 it founded New Ventures India and 2008 New Ventures Columbia.

== Global Centers ==
=== Brazil ===
New Ventures Brazil was created in 2002. It has assisted more than 10 enterprises. It organizes the "New Ventures Investor Forum" annually since 2004, which presents projects to global investors. The Center is currently directed by Marcelo Torres.

=== China ===
New Ventures China was established in 1994 in collaboration with the Institute for Environment and Development. Its development program focuses on enterprises that aim for energy conservation, emission reduction and low carbon consumption, and it assists them by means of workshops and forums. In the last 7 year more than 400 enterprises have participated in the workshops, more than 60 have finished their development program and it has assisted more than 20 to acquire investments of around $150 million.

=== Colombia ===
New Ventures Colombia was created in 2008 with the support of the University of the Andes's Business School, which host the centre. In 2009 it received the support of Aspen Network of Development Entrepreneurs, which allowed the centre to establish itself as the first accelerator of sustainable enterprises in Colombia. They have assisted more than 22 small and medium enterprises. It holds an annual investor that connects entrepreneurs with the regional and national business sector.

=== India ===
New Ventures Inda was founded in 2006. It focuses on accelerating SMEs that generate economic, environmental and social benefits, and it connects them to investment capital. As with other centres, it has a network of mentors who are the chief officers of notorious businesses. The mentors offer their time for free to instruct entrepreneurs in how to develop their businesses. New Ventures India also holds an annual investor forum.

=== Indonesia ===
New Ventures Indonesia was created in 2005 and its acceleration program is very similar to the one in India, where enterprises attend an investor forum after completing their accelerated process. The 10 most attractive enterprises are selected in the forum and they show their businesses to a group of investor and potential partners. The event has been held since 2006, but it has to be cancelled in 2008 due to no entrepreneurs meeting the quality standards required for participation. New Ventures Indonesia also has an alliance with a local university, by which they have held 3 investor forums and 25 seminars on sustainable businesses, with an attendance of more than 150 businesses.

=== Mexico ===
New Ventures México is the longest running program, being started in 2000 with the support of the Fondo Mexicano para la Conservación de la Naturaleza. It is the centre that has grown the most, establishing itself as one of the leading accelerators in the country, and the main green business accelerator. Its acceleration program assists 20 enterprises each year, and it works using mentors and follow-ups to make the enterprises achieve growth.

New Ventures México organizes the "Foro Latinoamericano de Inversión de Impacto" since 2011. The forum gathers businessmen and investors from Latin America in order to achieve investment and strategic alliances to support the sector. In 2008 they created "Las Páginas Verdes" ("The Green Pages"), a directory of sustainable products and services, with the aim of promoting responsible consumption and to encourage economic growth. The directory offers free listing to green SMEs. 200 thousand copies were distributed nationally in 2011 alone.

The Center organizes Ecofest, a festival that gathers green enterprises and NGOs in a public forum. It has a daily attendance of 25 thousand people. Also they created Adobe Capital, an investment fund that looks for environmental and social SMEs in their growth stage, specifically in under-privileged areas, in order to invest in them.

== See also ==
- Impact Investing
