= List of presidents of the University of Alberta =

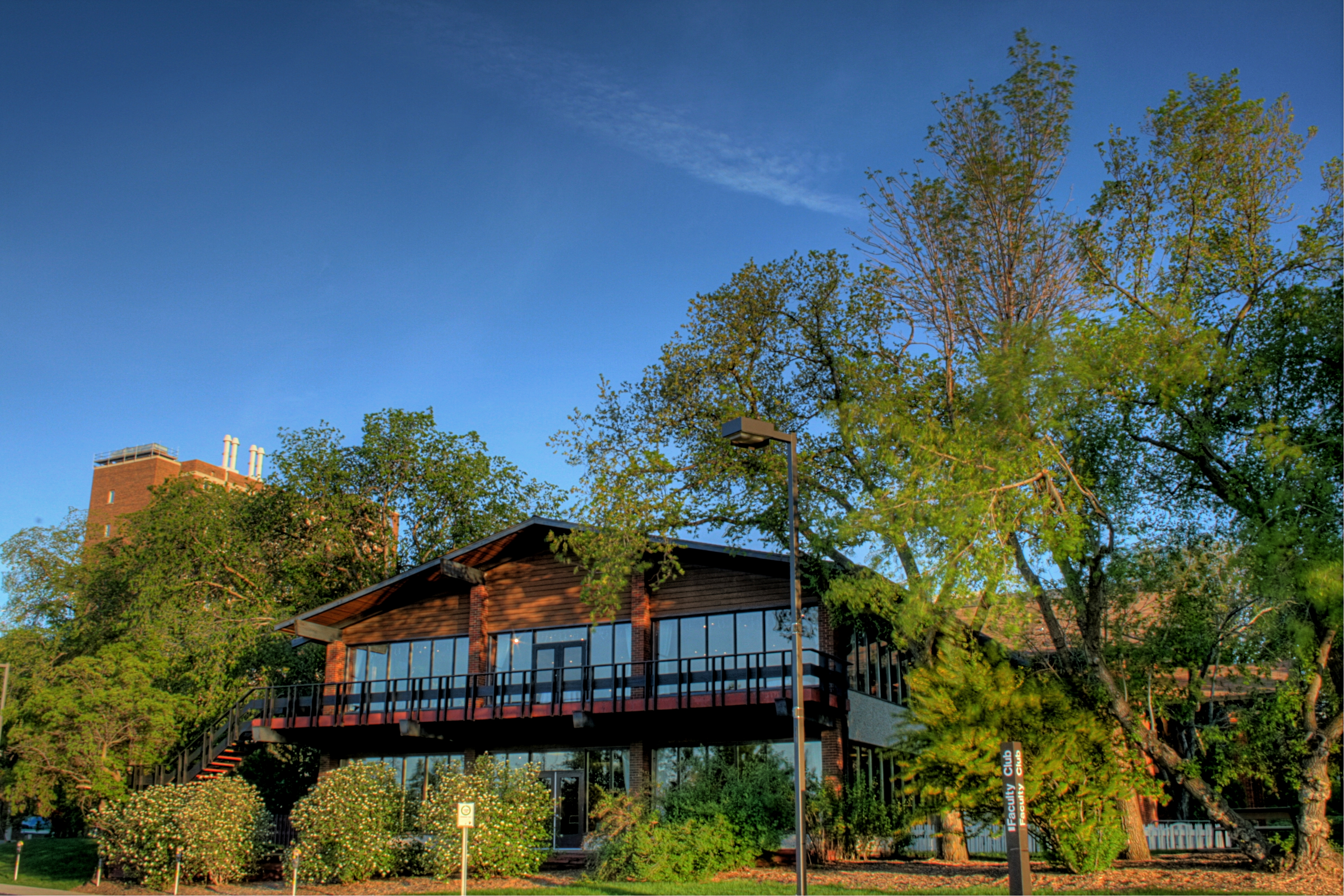
The Faculty Club on the north campus of the University of Alberta

The list of presidents of the University of Alberta, Edmonton, Alberta, Canada:

1. Henry Marshall Tory (1908–1928)
2. Robert C. Wallace (1928–1936)
3. William A. R. Kerr (1936–1941)
4. Robert Newton (1941–1950)
5. Andrew Stewart (1950–1959)
6. Walter H. Johns (1959–1969)
7. Max Wyman (1969–1974)
8. Harry Gunning (1974–1979)
9. Myer Horowitz (1979–1989)
10. Paul T. Davenport (1989–1994); W. John McDonald (acting) (1994–1995)
11. Roderick D. Fraser (1995–2005)
12. Indira Samarasekera (2005–2015)
13. David Turpin (2015–2020)
14. Bill Flanagan (2020–Present)
