= List of people from Lethbridge =

This is a list of notable people who are from Lethbridge, Alberta, Canada or have spent a large part or formative part of their career in that city. People from Lethbridge have historically been called Lethbridgeites or Lethbridgians and are colloquially known by some as Lethbians.

- Ernie Afaganis, CBC sports broadcaster
- Richard Joseph Audet, flying ace during World War II
- Conrad Bain, actor
- Bob Bainborough, actor
- Doug Barkley, hockey player
- Roloff Beny, photographer
- Rosella Bjornson, first female pilot for a commercial airline in North America
- Bertram Brockhouse, Nobel Prize winner
- Ronnie Burkett, puppeteer
- Janet Cardiff, artist
- David Cormican, film and television producer and showrunner
- Gavin Crawford, actor
- Morgan Crooks, Olympic rower
- Marshal Iwaasa, man who mysteriously disappeared in 2019
- Brandon Davidson, hockey player
- Jason Day, mixed martial artist
- Jack de Heer, hockey player
- Kent Derricott, actor
- Brad Erdos, gridiron football player
- Joyce Fairbairn, Canadian senator
- Emmitt Finnie, NHL player for the Detroit Red Wings
- William Fruet, film and television writer and director
- Mark Hartigan, played in the NHL for the Anaheim Ducks, Atlanta Thrashers, Columbus Blue Jackets, and Detroit Red Wings
- Dar Heatherington, politician
- David Hoffos, contemporary artist
- Earl Ingarfield Sr., hockey player
- Athena Karkanis, actor
- John Krizanc, playwright
- Cody Legebokoff, serial killer
- Ernest George Mardon, educator and author
- Kari Matchett, actor
- Bill Matheson, meteorologist
- Anne-Marie Mediwake, broadcaster
- Tanner McLachlan, football player
- Jordan Mein, mixed martial artist
- Joseph Meli, four-time Canadian Olympian (judo)
- Cheryl Misak, philosopher
- Ryland Moranz, musician
- Chris Pearson, first Premier of Yukon
- Tara-Jean Popowich, winner of So You Think You Can Dance Canada (Season 2)
- Jamie Pushor, hockey player
- Duncan Regehr, actor
- Stacy Roest, hockey player
- Chava Rosenfarb, author and Holocaust survivor
- John Andrew Roth (born 1942), CEO of Nortel
- Gary Simmons, hockey player
- Linda Smith, novelist
- Vern Smith, hockey player
- Vic Stasiuk, hockey player
- Richard Stevenson, poet
- John Smith Stewart, soldier and politician
- Darcy Tamayose, writer
- Theo Tams, winner of Canadian Idol Season 6 (2008)
- Kris Versteeg, hockey player
- Mitch Versteeg, hockey player
- Doug Vogt, photojournalist
- Michael Wex, novelist and playwright
- Jaime VandenBerg, 2025 Titleholder of Miss Universe Canada
- Max Wyman, 7th president of the University of Alberta (1969-1974)

== See also ==
- History of Lethbridge
