= MacOdrum =

MacOdrum is a surname. Notable people with the surname include:

- Charles MacOdrum (died 1954), Canadian politician
- Murdoch Maxwell MacOdrum (1901–1955), Canadian clergyman

== See also ==
- MacOdrum Library
