= Amit Chakma =

Vice-Chancellor (born 1959)

- অমিত চাকমা

19th Vice Chancellor and President of the University of Western Australia
- Incumbent
- Assumed office 6 July 2020
- Chancellor: Diane Smith-Gander
- Preceded by: Dawn Freshwater

10th President and Vice Chancellor of the University of Western Ontario
- In office 1 July 2009 – 30 June 2019
- Chancellor: John Thompson; Joseph Rotman; Jack Cowin
- Preceded by: Paul Davenport
- Succeeded by: Alan Shepard

Personal details
- Born: 25 April 1959 (age 67) Chittagong Hill Tracts, East Pakistan, Pakistan (now Bangladesh)
- Education: Algerian Petroleum Institute (BSc); University of British Columbia (MSc, PhD)

Amit Chakma (Bengali: অমিত চাকমা; born 25 April 1959) is a university administrator who was appointed vice-chancellor of the University of Western Australia in July 2020. Previously he served as the 10th president and vice-chancellor of the University of Western Ontario from 2009 to 2019.

== Early life and education ==
The Chakma people are an ethnic minority from the south-east region of Bangladesh and Northeast India.

Chakma was born in the Chittagong Hill Tracts of the then East Pakistan (now Bangladesh) to Prabhat Chakma and Alo Chakma. He was the eldest among four siblings. He studied in Ispahani School in Comilla and completed his secondary education from Rangamati Government High School. He passed his HSC examination from Dhaka College in 1976. He received a scholarship from the Algerian government to study chemical engineering at the Algerian Petroleum Institute in Algeria. In 1982, he graduated at the top of his class. He then moved to Canada and earned a Master of Applied Science and PhD in chemical engineering from the University of British Columbia in 1984 and 1987 respectively.

== Career ==
=== Academic ===
From 1988 until 1996, Chakma taught chemical engineering at the University of Calgary. In 1996, he moved to the University of Regina as dean of engineering. He then served as Regina's vice president research from 1999 to 2001. During his time at the University of Regina, Chakma was named to Canada's Top 40 Under 40 list. He became vice president academic and provost at the University of Waterloo in 2001. His research interests are natural gas engineering and petroleum waste management.

=== Executive leadership ===
On July 1, 2009, Chakma succeeded Paul Davenport as the University of Western Ontario's president. Having left the University of Waterloo, he has been noted for his service to both the university and the academic and business community of Kitchener-Waterloo. At the University of Western Ontario, Chakma led a rebranding exercise in 2012 that resulted in rebranding the institution as Western University He was reappointed to serve a second five-year term the same year. In 2014, Western's Senate and Board of Governors approved the University's ambitious strategic plan titled "Achieving Excellence on the World Stage.

=== Industry leadership ===
Chakma served as the Chair of U15 Group of Canadian Research Universities from 2012-2014. Successful advocacy during this period led to the creation of the $1.2 billion "The Canada First Research Excellence Program" by the Government of Canada to support competitively selected Canadian post secondary institutions to turn their key strengths into world-leading capabilities.

He has been serving as a Trustee and a member of the executive committee of the Association of Commonwealth Universities, the world's first and oldest network of universities since 2014. He was elected as Chair of Council in 2017.

== Awards and recognition ==
On June 19, 2010 Chakma received an honorary doctor of engineering degree from the University of Waterloo. Chakma was recognized for playing a leading role in the establishment of a new health sciences campus in Kitchener and the relocation of the school of architecture to Cambridge during his tenure as vice-president at Waterloo.

In 2012, Chakma received the Queen Elizabeth II Diamond Jubilee Medal in recognition of his contributions to Canadian post-secondary education.

In 2014, Chakma was awarded a Top 25 Canadian Immigrants Award. The award citation described how Chakma used education as the basis for his remarkable journey as a young boy from a tribe in the hills of southeastern Bangladesh to becoming a university president in Canada.

In 2014, Chakma was the recipient of the Michael P. Malone International Leadership Award. The award is meant to provide national recognition for a career of outstanding contributions to further international education at state and land-grant institutions. The award is named after Michael P. Malone, an American historian and 10th president of Montana State University.

In 2015 Chakma received a Lifetime Achievement Award from the Engineering Alumni group at the University of British Columbia. This was followed by the awarding of a Dean's Medal of Distinction from UBC Faculty of Applied Science in 2016 as part of UBC's centenary celebrations.

On March 4, 2017, he was the convocation speaker at the 50th convocation of the University of Dhaka, the pre-eminent university locally known as the Oxford of the East, where he was bestowed Doctor of Science (Honoris Causa) by President Abdul Hamid of Bangladesh, the Chancellor of the University for his outstanding leadership in education and research.

On October 12, 2018, University of Western Ontario announced that the University's new engineering building would be called the Amit Chakma Engineering Building. In a statement, Western said the name was "inspired by Chakma's leadership and vision to grow Western's competitiveness on the world stage".

== Public service ==
Chakma is an advocate for promoting international education and has written and commented extensively on this topic. He chaired an Advisory Panel on Canada's International Education Strategy in 2011–12. One of the key recommendations was to double the number of international students in Canada by 2022. The Government of Canada has endorsed this key recommendation and adopted its International Education Strategy in 2014. The goal of doubling international students in Canada to over 450,000 was surpassed five years earlier in 2017.

He was appointed to Canada's Science and Technology Innovation Council in 2012.

He served as the founding chair of HealthForce Ontario Marketing and Recruitment Agency, a crown corporation set up to build and maintain the province's health human resources capacity by supporting the government's strategic direction of health workforce planning from 2007 to 2010.

== International engagement ==
Chakma has served as chair of the board of directors of a Canada-based development organization of long standing the World University Services of Canada (WUSC) from 2011 to 2015.

He also served on the board of trustees of the Asian University for Women, an international liberal arts university located in Chittagong, Bangladesh from 2012 to 2015 as vice-chair and acting chair.

== Controversy ==
While he was dean of engineering at the University of Regina in 1998, Chakma hired Lana Nguyen as a professor of systems software engineering. Chakma said in his recommendation that "Nguyen's candidacy has been the fruit of our relentless proactive efforts in identifying potential women faculty members." Nguyen taught at Regina for two years before students and faculty, suspicious on account of Nguyen's apparent lack of knowledge, discovered that she had defrauded the University by claiming her ex-husband's doctoral degree as her own.

On March 27, 2015, Chakma came under criticism after reportedly earning $967,000 in salary and benefits in 2014, a year in which class sizes grew as Western administrators squeezed faculty, shrunk staffing and left empty vacated positions. Chakma's pay was a result of "double-dipping," allowing him to collect a second full salary for choosing to work during his paid administrative leave.

On March 30, 2015, Member of Provincial Parliament for London-West, Peggy Sattler asked in the Provincial Parliament question period whether the government would prohibit university boards of governors from negotiating similar double payouts to university presidents. Training, Colleges and Universities Minister Reza Moridi replied that a bill had been passed the previous year allowing public sector executive compensation to be capped, but that Chakma's contract was signed before this legislation came into force.
