= Ben F. Koop =

Canadian biologist and geneticist

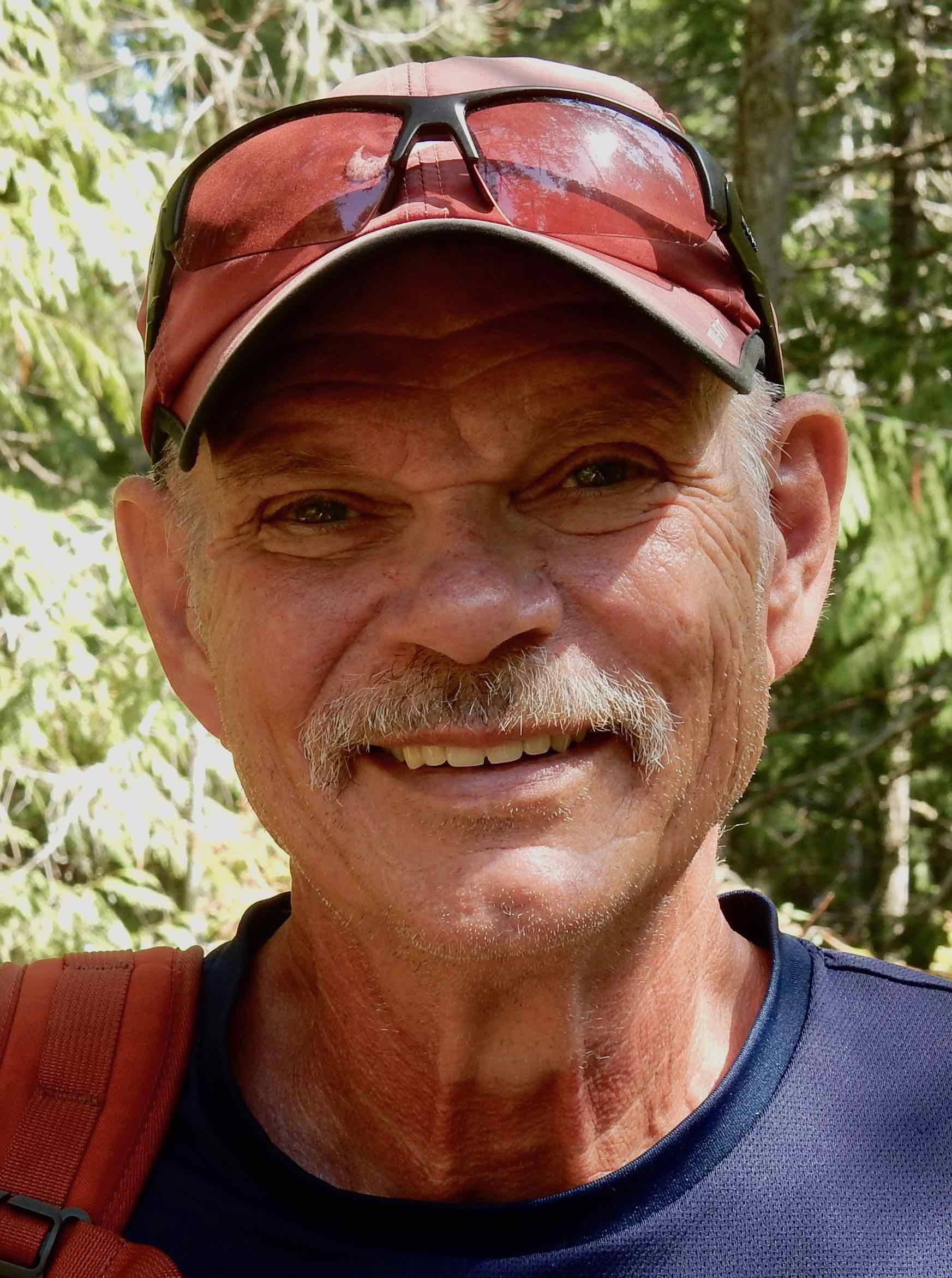
- Born: Vancouver, British Columbia, Canada
- Spouse: Jane Carol
- Awards: Distinguished Human Genome Fellow (1991), EWR Steacie (2001), Canada Research Chair (2003-2024), Fellow Royal Society of Canada (2009), Genome BC Award for Scientific Excellence (2009), Kabata Award for Research Excellence (2014) David H. Turpin Gold Medal for Career Achievement (2020)

Academic background
- Education: BSc, MSc, Zoology, 1982, Texas Tech University; PhD, Molecular Biology and Genetics, 1988, Wayne State University; PDF, 1992, California Institute of Technology
- Thesis: Expression and evolution of mammalian beta-globin genes (1988)

Benjamin F. Koop is an Emeritus Professor at the University of Victoria and Canadian molecular biologist and evolutionary geneticist. From 2003 to 2024 he was a Tier 1 Canada Research Chair in Genomics and Molecular Biology at the University of Victoria.

== Early life and education ==
Koop is a native of Fort St. John, British Columbia but earned his Bachelor of Science degree and Master's degree from Texas Tech University. Following this, he completed his PhD in molecular biology and genetics from Wayne State University and a postdoctoral fellowship at the California Institute of Technology.

== Career ==
Upon completing his postdoctoral fellowship, Koop returned to his home province and joined the biology department at the University of Victoria (UVic) in 1992. During his early tenure at the school, he collaborated with Leroy Hood at the University of Washington to focus on the similarities in the DNA in human and mouse immune system genes. Following that work, he received a grant from the Canadian Genome Analysis and Technology Project to research the sequence of genes responsible for related immunogenetic disorders. In 1996, he collaborated in documenting a segment of the human beta T-cell receptor gene, which was then the largest human genome sequence. He was promoted to department chair in July 2000, and in 2001 Koop's research earned him a Natural Sciences and Engineering Research Council EWR Steacie Memorial Fellowship.

During his second year of the Steacie Fellowship, while also serving as Director of UVic’s Center for Biomedical Research, Koop was named a Tier 1 Canada Research Chair (CRC) in Genomics and Molecular Biology. He received the CRC to fund research into the immune system genes and salmon genomics. Soon after, Koop was named the co-leader of the Genomics Research on Atlantic Salmon Project (GRASP with William Davidson), an international project to map the salmon genome. Subsequently, he built on the data collected from GRASP to lead the Consortium for Genomics Research on All Salmonids Project together with collaborators from SFU and Norway. In 2009, Koop also initiated a third research project titled Genomics in Lice and Salmon, (GiLS) which aimed to use genomics tools to understand how Pacific sea lice interact with their salmonid hosts. He subsequently earned the 2009 Genome BC Award for Scientific Excellence from LifeSciences BC. With support from GenomeBC he went on to collaborate with Dr. Davidson from SFU and leaders from Chile and Norway to build and publish the first Atlantic salmon genome. Later with support from GenomeBC and Genome Canada (with Louis Bernatchez & William Davidson) coho salmon genome and population studies led to new insights on coho population evolution and adaptation (EPIC4). This further lead to major studies on other Pacific salmon genomes, gene annotations and genetic variation surveys with support from Fisheries and Oceans Canada (Robert Devlin)(chinook, sockeye, chum, pink, coho, masu and cutthroat ). The importance of this work comes from an early ancestral whole genome duplication (all genes are duplicated) that occurred ~ 100 million years ago. The independent evolution of duplicated genes and the resulting species provides important insights into how early vertebrates evolved from an initial two rounds of whole genome duplications. It further provides key information on how the evolution of gene duplicates contribute to the specialization of the different salmonid species in response to different environments.

As a "world leader in salmonid genomics," Koop was elected a Fellow of the Royal Society of Canada in 2009. The following year, his CRC was renewed for a second term. In 2020 he was awarded the David H. Turpin Gold Medal for Career Achievement in Research for "having a distinguished record of research that has advanced substantially the discipline." Publications and citations are listed in Google Scholar Dr. Koop is currently Professor Emeritus in the Department of Biology at the University of Victoria. He continues to serve on the RCMP Advisory Committee for the National DNA database, as a Board Member for GenomeBC and award committees at the University of Victoria.
