= James Alexander Gibson =

Canadian academic (1912–2003)

- Born: January 29, 1912; Ottawa, Ontario, Canada
- Died: October 23, 2003 (aged 91); Ottawa, Ontario, Canada
- Education: University of British Columbia, University of Oxford
- Occupations: government official, academic

James Alexander Gibson (January 29, 1912 – October 23, 2003) was a Canadian academic, federal bureaucrat and private secretary to prime minister William Lyon Mackenzie King.

Born in Ottawa and raised in Victoria, Gibson did his undergraduate studies at the University of British Columbia. After winning a Rhodes Scholarship, he earned his doctorate of philosophy from Oxford. In 1938 he joined Canada's Department of External Affairs, but was recruited for the Prime Minister's Office in 1940 to be a speechwriter and protocol expert. Gibson accompanied Mackenzie King on several diplomatic missions — including his two wartime strategy sessions with the U.S. and British governments in Quebec City — and in 1945 he was part of the Canadian delegation to the first United Nations conference in San Francisco.

Gibson left the federal government in 1947 for a teaching position at Carleton College (later Carleton University) in Ottawa. He spent 12 years as the school's dean of arts and science, and served for a year as interim president after the death of president Murdoch Maxwell MacOdrum in 1955.

Gibson was appointed as the founding president of Brock University in 1963, and held that office for 11 years before his retirement. He died in Ottawa in 2003. Brock University's library was named the James A. Gibson Library in his honour.
