= Khaki University =

Canadian institution in Britain, 1917–1919, 1945–1946

- Motto: Rations for the Mind
- Type: Canadian educational institution Military college
- Established: 1917
- Affiliations: Canadian Expeditionary Force
- President: Dr Henry Marshall Tory
- Undergraduates: available
- Location: various locations, Great Britain and France

Khaki University (initially Khaki College or University of Vimy Ridge) was a Canadian overseas educational institution set up and managed by the general staff of the Canadian Expeditionary Force (CEF) in Britain 1917–19 during the First World War. The system, named for the khaki-coloured uniforms of the CEF, was set up by the efforts of Henry Marshall Tory and Edmund Henry Oliver and was supported by the Young Men's Christian Association (YMCA). This university with makeshift colleges mainly in central England provided education on a range of subjects to more than 50,000 soldiers and the certificates given were accepted by Canadian universities. The term was used again for Canadian educational programs for veterans from 1945 to 1946 after the Second World War.

== History ==
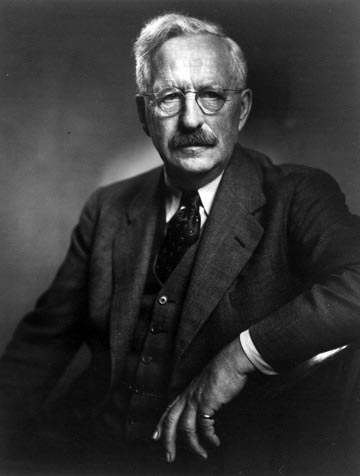
Dr Henry Marshall Tory, president of Khaki University

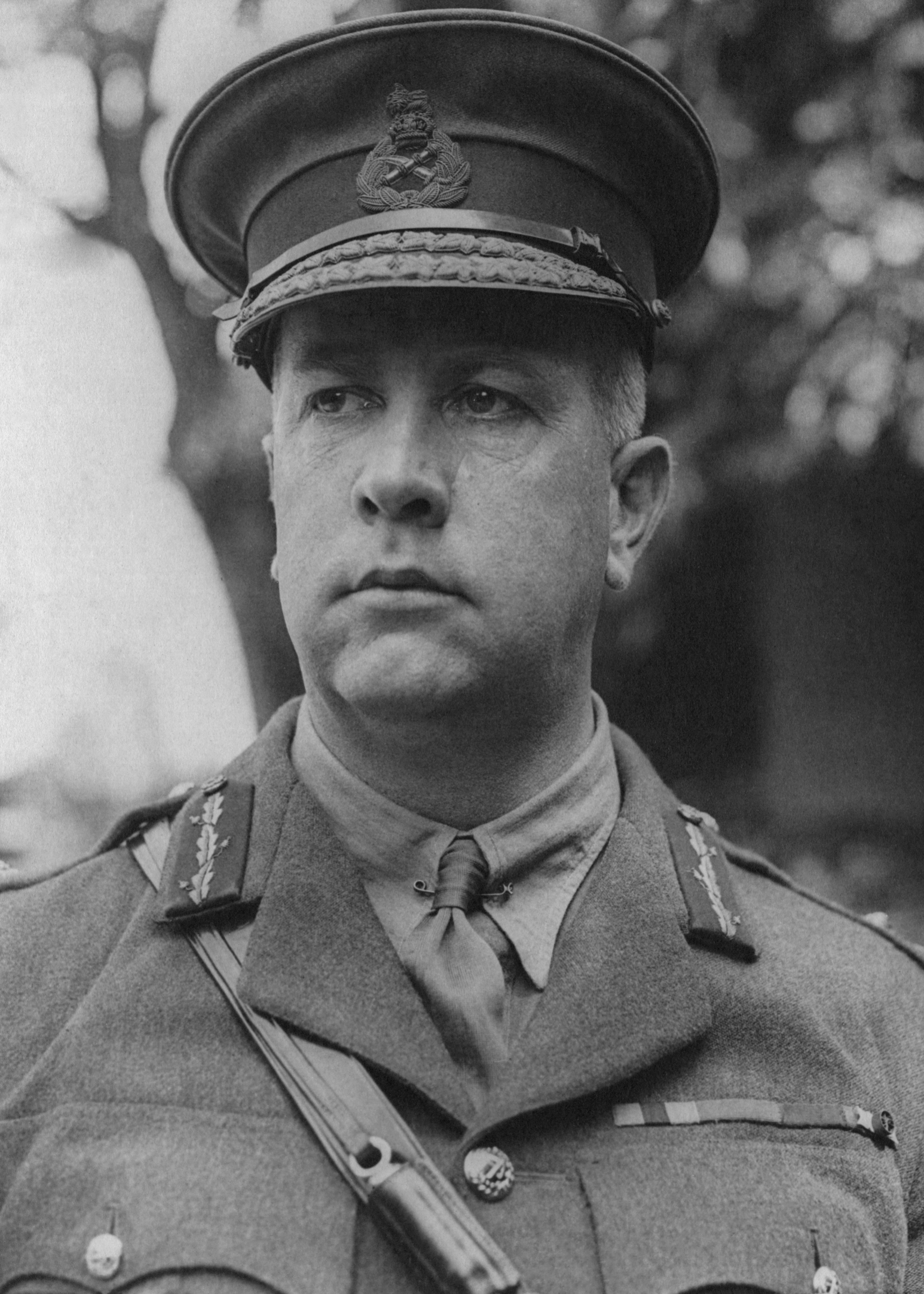
General Arthur Currie, approved Khaki University

The scheme for education of Canadian army soldiers serving in Europe during the First World War evolved from classes conducted by army chaplains. They noted the need for books and courses and to provide vocational training for soldiers following demobilization. In the winter of 1917–18 chaplain Edmund Henry Oliver started what he called the "University of Vimy Ridge" in Flanders. The idea was given more support by Colonel Henry Marshall Tory with collaboration from Canadian Universities to start "Khaki colleges" in England. Oliver also worked with Colonel G.W. Birks who headed the YMCA. On December 16, 1917, Oliver met Lt.General Sir Arthur Currie who assigned Oliver as Officer in Charge of Technical and Vocational Education. Initially the scheme in France under Oliver and the scheme in England under Tory had considerable differences. Colonel Tory's plan for a more formal "Khaki University" was approved on November 8, 1918, and provided for the establishment of a Department of Educational Services in the Overseas Forces of Canada, the Khaki University of Canada. The Khaki colleges initially included a range of subjects from secondary, high school and matriculation to provide prerequisites for entry into Canadian and British universities. The scheme was backed by the Canadian general including Sir Robert Borden. The YMCA raised $500,000 and by armistice day about 14 colleges across England were in operation. Nearly 650000 soldiers attended the lectures with an enrolment of 50000 and nearly 2000 registered at the Khaki University at Ripon.

=== Founders ===
Padres and officers had organized educational classes and Bible study groups for enlisted men from the start of the Great War in 1914. Although Padres J.M. Almond and Clarence MacKinnon wanted the Khaki University under the control of the chaplain services, ultimately, a formal educational program was implemented among their soldiers.

==== Gerald Birks ====
Colonel Gerald Birks, a World War I double flying ace with the Royal Flying Corps, supervisor of the YMCA Canadian Overseas, sought to offer educational courses to keep soldiers busy in their spare time with a view to stave off the evils of gambling and / or drinking. He asked Henry Marshall Tory to write a report which recommended the formalization of educational services of Canadian forces overseas. After the War, Birks became a businessman, patron of the arts, was a painter and philanthropist.

==== Henry Marshall Tory ====
The programs were formalized in 1916 once Henry Marshall Tory recommended in a report on discharged men from the army the establishment of an educational institution in England and France, to be called the Khaki College of Canada, with an extension department providing services for other camps in Great Britain. The educational services of Canadian forces overseas was organized and planned by Henry Marshall Tory who became president of the Khaki College in 1917, while he was on leave as president of the University of Alberta. After the War, Tory returned as president of the University of Alberta. Later he then founded a college which became Carleton University.

==== Arthur Currie ====
General Arthur Currie approved Khaki University as a component of the training for all soldiers in all divisions on 18 December 1917. After the War, Currie became the president and vice chancellor of McGill University in Montreal, Quebec. Under the general staff of the Canadian Army, the Khaki College became the educational services of Canadian Forces overseas in 1918. The program, which grew from the chaplain services of the Canadian Army and study groups of the Canadian of the YMCA, was a forerunner of similar programs in the military forces of other countries.

== Mission ==
The goals were to provide morale during the war and for demobilized personnel, and to provide personnel an opportunity to continue their education in postwar preparation. Initially, the university-educated chaplains and officers acted as instructors, spiritual counsellors and guardians of morality. Once the Khaki University was formally recognized by the government, universities began to send professors to Europe to help the skeleton force of teachers from military headquarters teach. Khaki University credits were recognized as equivalent to those of Canadian institutions.

== France ==
Major-General L.J. Lipsett organized the first educational courses. Captain Edmund H. Oliver became head of the University of Vimy Ridge (UVR), a component of the Khaki University. Oliver was a Chaplain in the 4th Divisional Wing and former Principal of the Presbyterian Theological College in Saskatoon, set up a course of instruction for soldiers in the 3rd Infantry Division, then fighting on the Western Front. Captain Edmund H. Oliver wrote "It was felt by the GOC, 3rd Division, that the long evenings of winter during the period when the men were in rest or in reserve could be utilized not only to relieve the monotony of the daily routine, but as well, in some measure, to equip men for greater efficiency in business, the professions, agriculture and the other great industries of the Dominion." The name was suggested by his executive assistant, Rev. Cpt. William Gilmour (1880–1938), after the great victory at the Battle of Vimy Ridge a few months earlier:

Vimy Ridge, Canada's Glory in the war will be Canada's Glory in the Peace; by the selflessness of those that died on that Battle-furrowed crest, and the mighty deeds of those that fought and lived, there was set up on that Triumphant day, the invisible Portals of the University of Vimy Ridge then-to-be, and its creation in these after-days is hallowed by the serene memory of those noble sons of Freedom who fought and died–that Canada might live.

== Programs ==
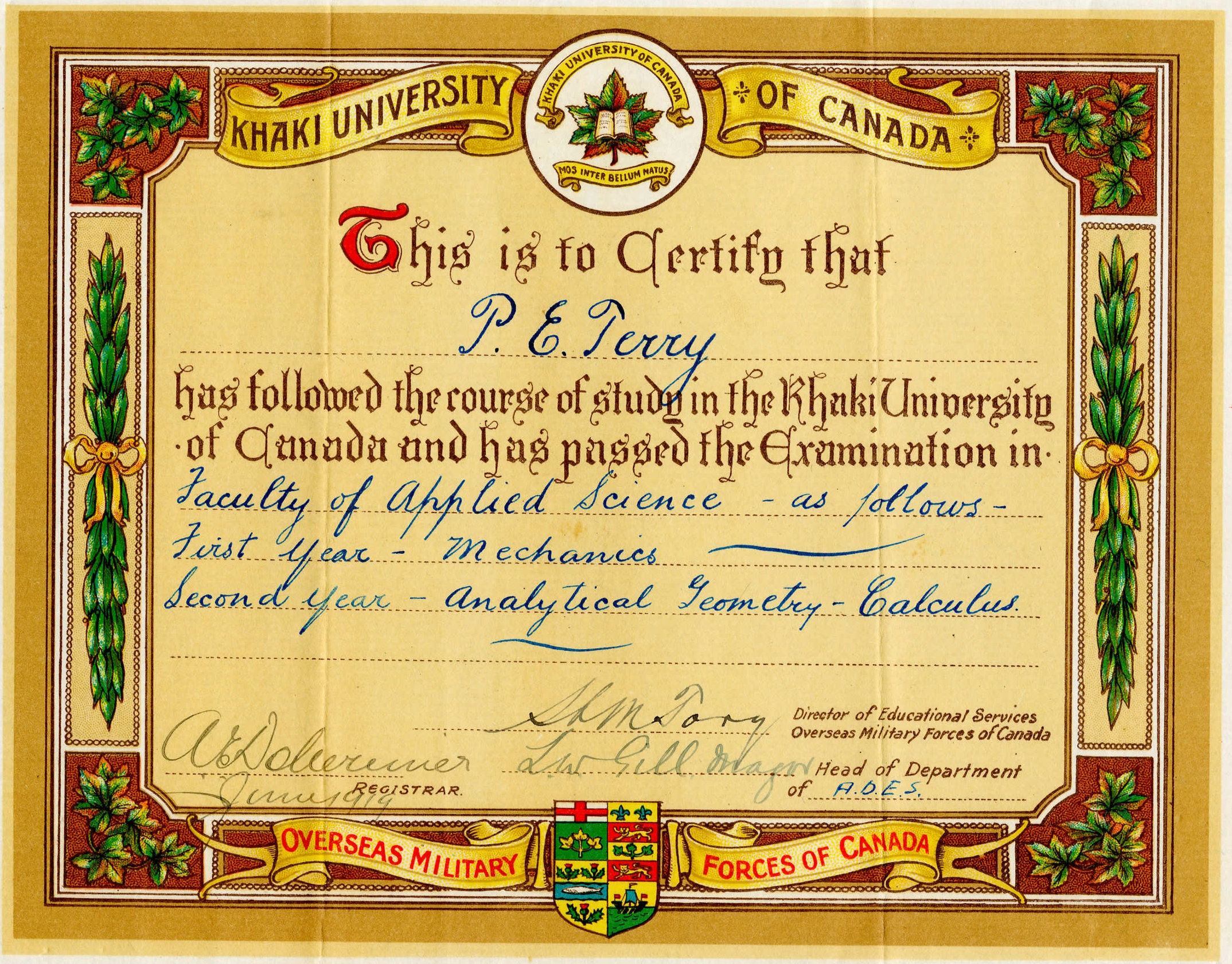
A Khaki University certificate

In 1917, 19 education centres were organized in the camps and hospitals in England and in France. About 50 000 soldiers taking courses part-time in agriculture, business education, mechanics, teacher training, legal studies and medical instruction. Designed to be inclusive, courses spanned commercial subjects; practical science; agriculture; literacy, languages; matriculation work, undergraduate university courses; and subjects like singing, elocution and cooking. In addition, practical trades like carpentry were offered. Khaki university taught illiterate men to read and write all the way to the instruction of 1,000 Canadian soldiers enrolled in university-level students. The training was delivered via lectures, small study and reading groups, classes and directed readings and practical hands-on training. Libraries were established and textbooks were approved by all Canadian provinces. In England, there were 11 Khaki Colleges by May 1918, with 400 Canadians taking courses at London University. In some cases, noted scholars and public figures such as Bernard Shaw lectured at the camp educational classes. During this period, one of the commanding officers was Canadian historian W. Stewart Wallace.

== Post-War ==
In 1939, the Canadian Legion Educational Services were established for Canadian Armed Forces at home and abroad.

== Legislation ==
In 1939, the War Emergency Training Program was established. In 1942, the Canadian federal government established the Federal Vocational Training Coordination Act. In 1944, the Canadian federal government established the Veterans' Rehabilitation Act. The Federal Apprenticeship Training Agreement (1944) was established followed by The Federal Vocational Schools Assistance Agreement (1945). In 1951, the War Emergency Training Program was re-established due to the Korean War.

== Second World War ==
During the Second World War, Brigadier Ted G. E. Beament was appointed Officer Commanding the Khaki University (principal). An extension department provided services for other camps in Great Britain and France. Beament was awarded the Governor General's Gold Medal upon his graduation from the Royal Military College of Canada (RMC) in 1929. Beament was awarded the Czechoslovak Military Cross at the beginning of 1946. On his staff was Lieutenant-Colonel Tom F. Gelley, who taught History and English at the RMC prior to the war and was the registrar of RMC following it. Major John F. Twiss was a professor of mathematics at the RMC both pre- and post-war. After the war, Beament was a prominent Ottawa lawyer who served as President of the RMC Club in 1952.

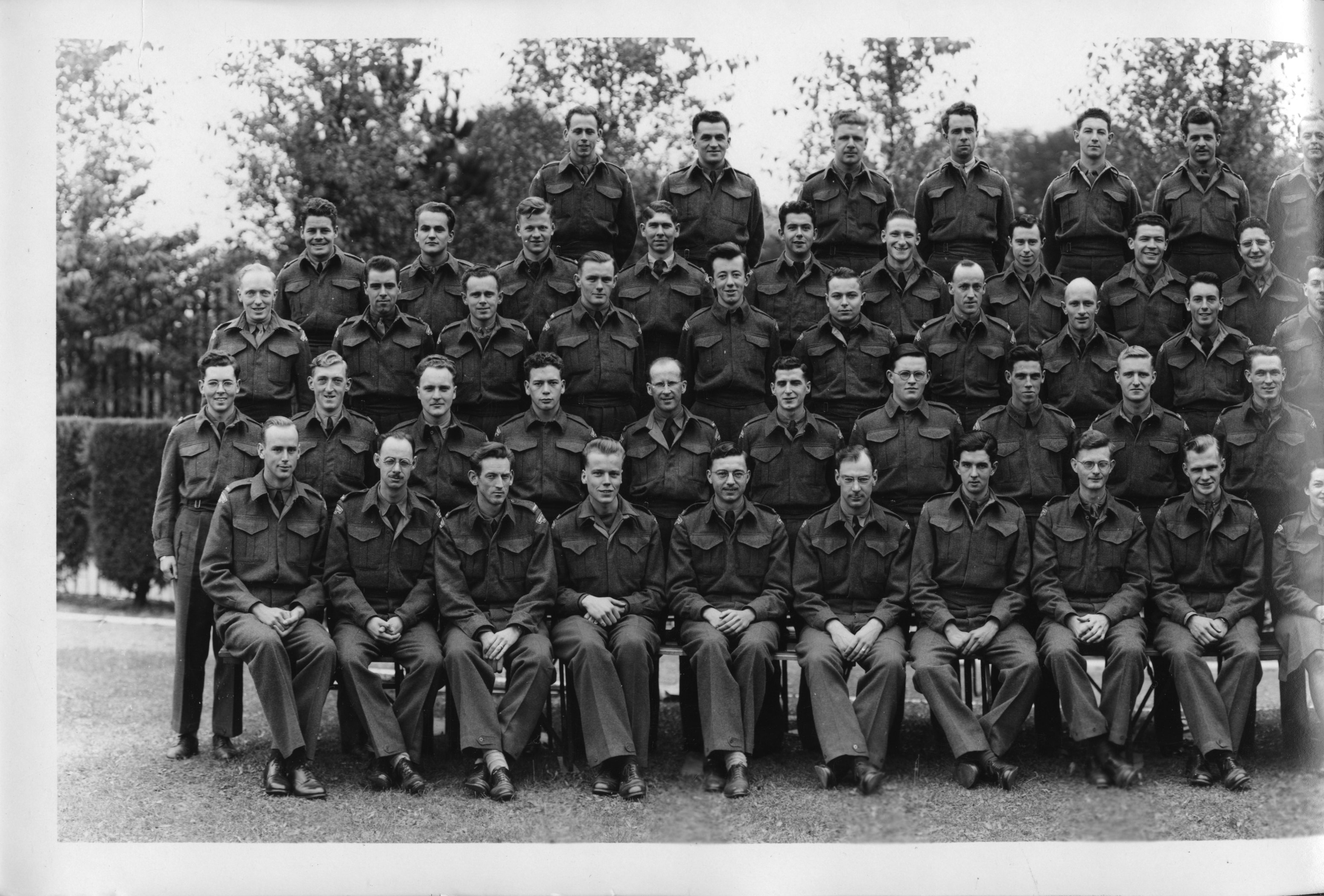
