= Khaki =

Color of tan commonly found in arid-region military uniforms

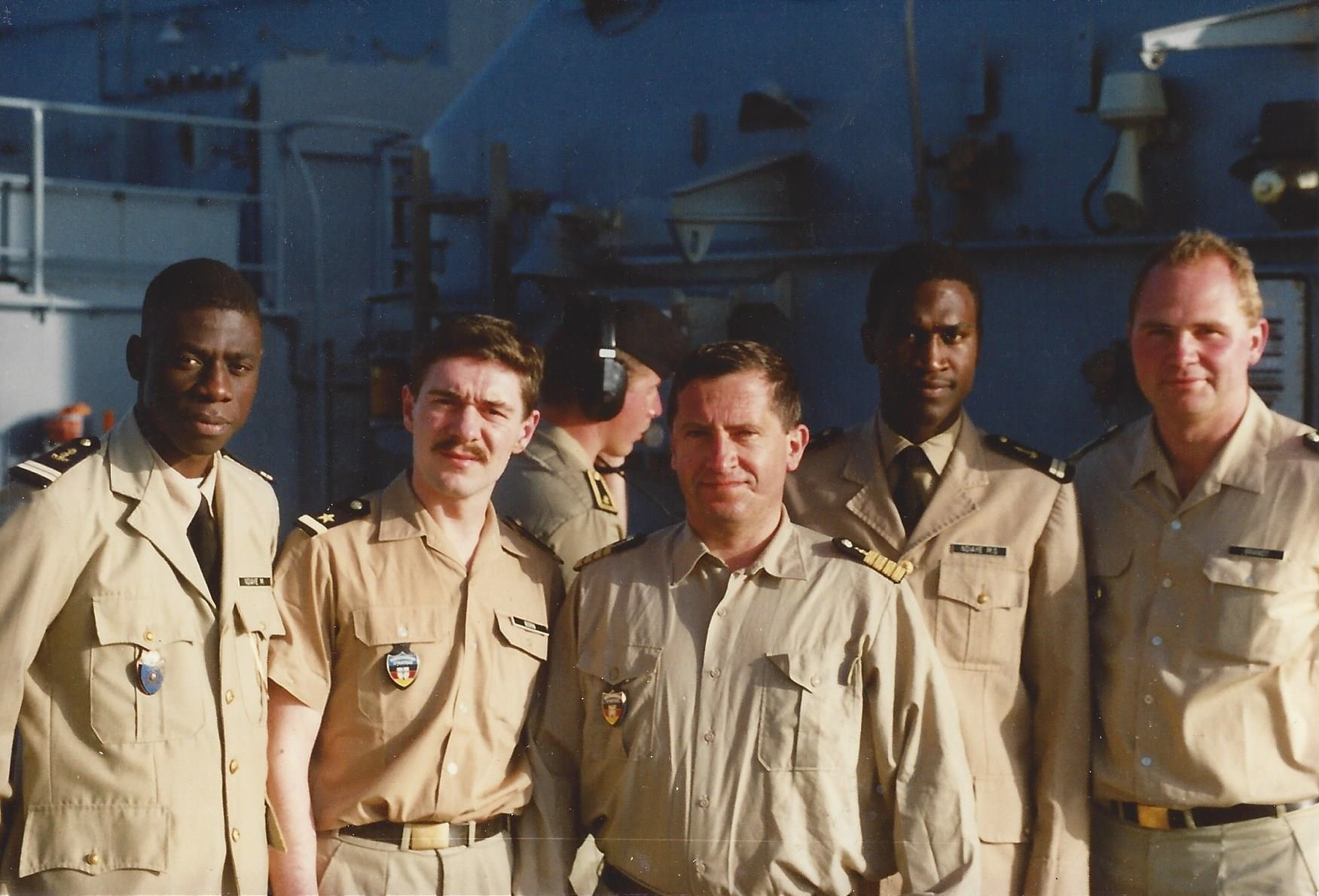
- German and Senegalese military officers

Color coordinates
- Hex triplet: #C3B091
- sRGB^{B} (r, g, b): (195, 176, 145)
- HSV (h, s, v): (37°, 26%, 76%)
- CIELCh_{uv} (L, C, h): (73, 28, 61°)
- ISCC–NBS descriptor: Grayish yellow
- B: Normalized to [0–255] (byte)

The color khaki (UK: /ˈkɑːki/, US: /ˈkæki/) is a light shade of tan with a slight yellowish tinge.

Khaki has been used by many armies around the world for uniforms and equipment, particularly in arid or desert regions, where it provides camouflage relative to sandy or dusty terrain. It has been used as a color name in English since 1848 when it was introduced as a military uniform. In Western fashion, it is a standard color for smart casual dress trousers for civilians, which are also often called khakis.

In British English and some other Commonwealth usage, khaki may also refer to a shade of green known as olive drab.

== Etymology ==
Khaki is a loanword from Hindustani (खाकी, خاکی; pronounced [ˈkʱaː.ˌki̯])'soil-colored', which in turn comes from Persian خاک [χɒːk] khāk 'soil' + ی (adjectival attributive suffix); it came into English via the British Indian Army.

== Origin ==
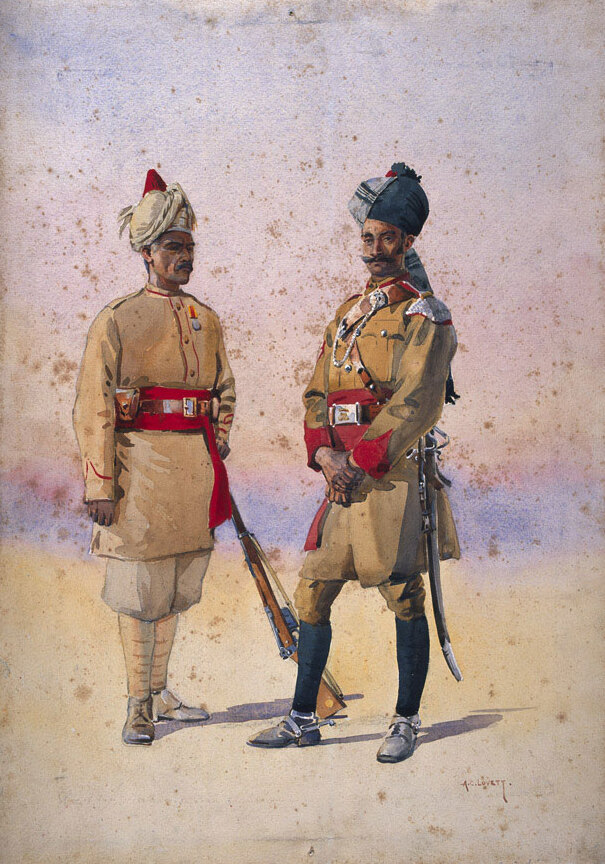
The Corps of Guides, the first military unit to wear khaki

Khaki was originally created in India and was later worn as a uniform in the Corps of Guides that was raised in December 1846 by Henry Lawrence (1806–1857), agent to the Governor-General for the North-West Frontier and stationed in Lahore. Khaki uniforms originated as part of the British Army's broader efforts in the mid 19th century to standardize military dress for colonial service, replacing locally varied and brightly colored garments with a uniform, practical field color. This shift reflected administrative reforms aimed at improving organization and discipline in overseas military operations. By the late 19th century, khaki had become the standard material for British colonial field uniforms.

Initially the border troops were dressed in their native costume, which consisted of a smock and white pajama trousers made of a coarse home-spun cotton, and a cotton turban, supplemented by a leather or padded cotton jacket for cold weather. In 1848, a khaki uniform was introduced. Subsequently, all regiments serving in the region, whether British or Indian, had adopted khaki uniforms for active service and summer dress. The original khaki fabric was a closely twilled cloth of linen or cotton. For example, European artillery regiments serving in Madras Presidency discontinued white summer clothing and adopted khakee (sic), on 26 June 1858.

== Military use ==
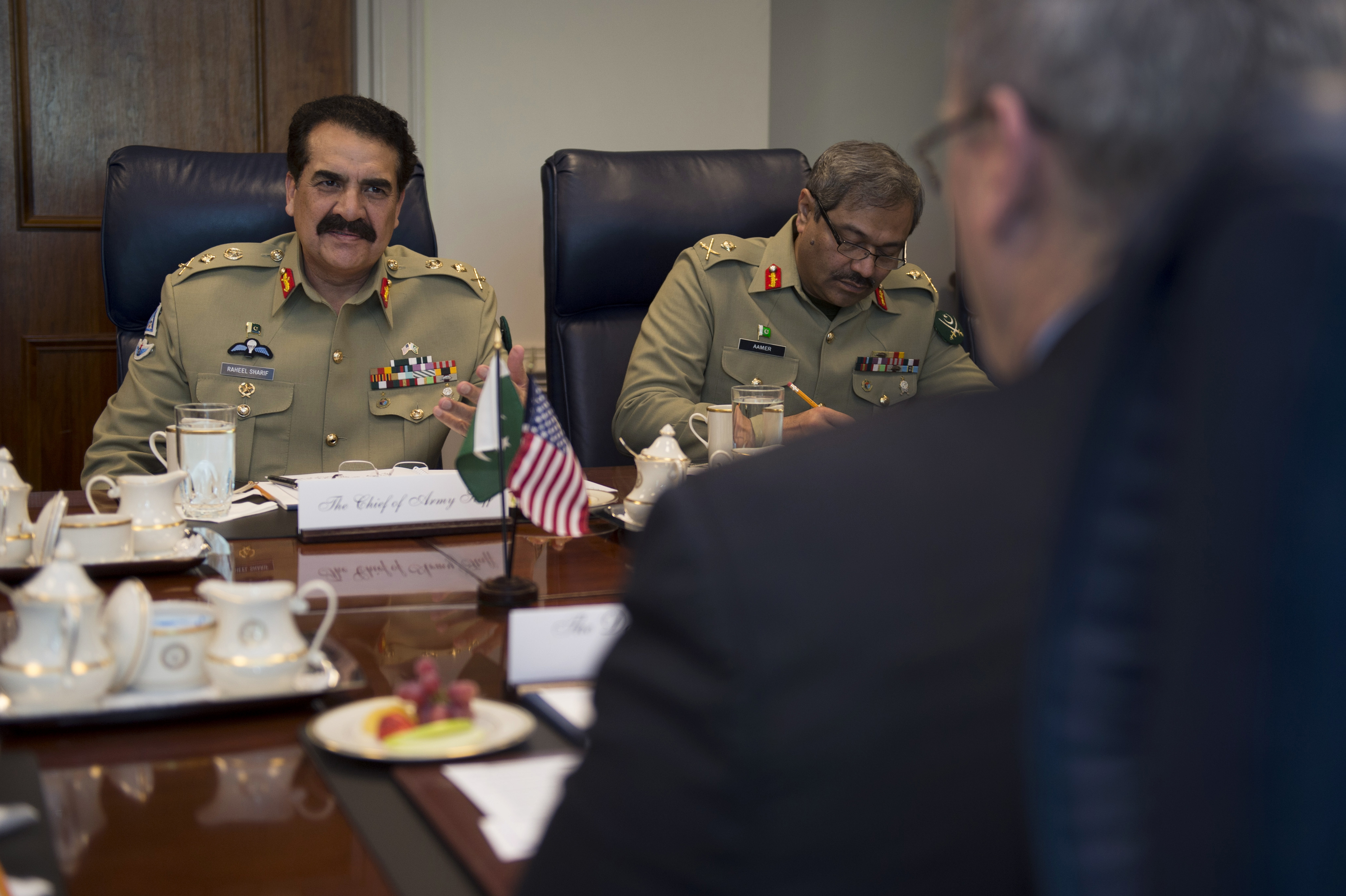
Pakistan Army General Raheel Sharif wearing khaki uniform

The impracticality of traditional bright colors such as the red coat, especially for skirmishing, was recognized early in the 19th century. A response to improved technologies such as aerial surveillance and smokeless powder, khaki could camouflage soldiers in the field of battle. The British switching from bright red coats to khaki emphasized military strategy and visibility over traditional uniforms.

Khaki-colored uniforms were used officially by British troops for the first time during the 1868 Expedition to Abyssinia, when Indian troops traveled to Ethiopia. Subsequently, the British Army adopted khaki for colonial campaign dress and it was used in the Mahdist War (1884–89) and Second Boer War (1899–1902). Khaki uniforms were widely implemented in the Second Boer War. The effectiveness of khaki in camouflaging troops led to its official standardization by Britain, replacing their traditional red uniforms. This marked a development in military technology, where the color of a uniform provided its wearer with an advantage in warfare. These uniforms became known as khaki drill, versions of which are still part of the uniforms of the British Army.

During the Second Boer War, the British forces became known as "Khakis" because of their uniforms. After victory in the war, the government called an election, which became known as the khaki election, a term used subsequently for elections called to exploit public approval of governments immediately after military victories.

The United States Army adopted khaki during the Spanish–American War (1898), replacing their traditional blue field uniforms. The United States Navy and United States Marine Corps followed suit, authorizing khaki field and work uniforms. A plain coat, trousers, five buttons, a standing collar, and a novelty belt completed the first full khaki uniform for the Spanish-America War.

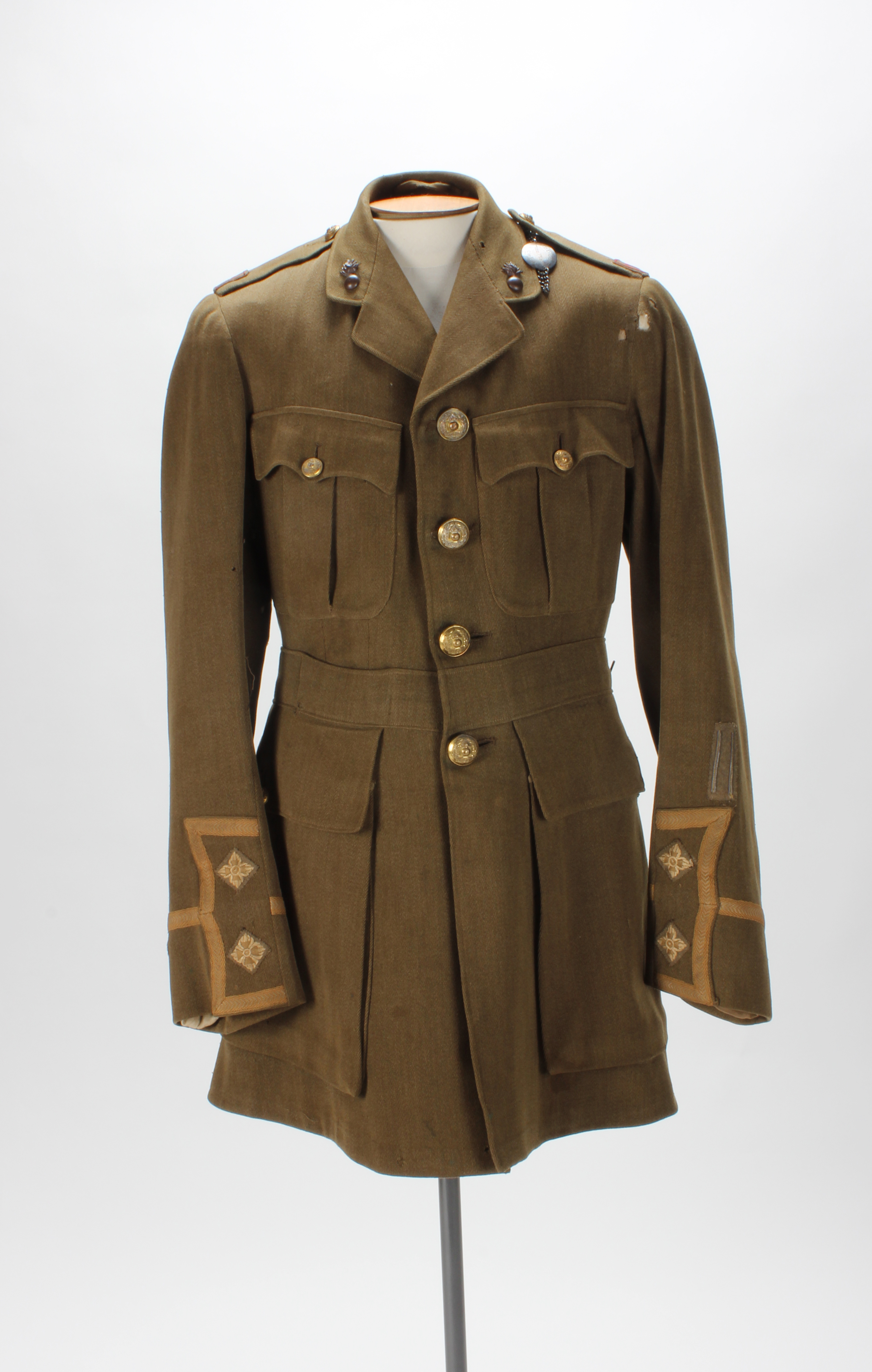
Dark khaki serge uniform jacket, Lieutenant, 7th London Regiment, First World War era.

When khaki was adopted for the continental British Service Dress in 1902, the shade chosen had a clearly darker and more green hue (see photo). This color was adopted with minor variations by all the British Empire armies. The 1902 US Army uniform regulations also adopted a similar shade for soldiers' winter service uniforms under the name olive drab. This shade of brown-green remained in use by many countries throughout the two World Wars. With the technological advances of mass-production, khaki fabric was able to be standardized across many military branches and forces. In 1913, khaki uniforms began to symbolize masculinity and patriotism, which led to the beginning of "Khaki Fever." Women in the army, air force, police service, auxiliary corps, and naval service all began to wear khaki, causing a major shift in gender roles and wartime positions as well.

== Use in civilian clothing ==
Following World War II, military-issue khaki-colored chino cloth twill trousers became a common part of civilian clothing. Today, the term khakis is sometimes used to refer to the style of trousers, properly called chinos, regardless of their color. By the early 1900s, khaki began influencing civilian fashion in Britain, where it was adopted for outdoor and work clothing. Although khaki had a plain appearance, it still functioned as a symbol of hierarchy and military structure in civilian life.

== Tones of khaki ==
=== Light khaki ===
Light Khaki

Color coordinates
- Hex triplet: #F0E68C
- sRGB^{B} (r, g, b): (240, 230, 140)
- HSV (h, s, v): (54°, 42%, 94%)
- CIELCh_{uv} (L, C, h): (90, 62, 80°)
- Source: X11
- ISCC–NBS descriptor: Light greenish yellow
- B: Normalized to [0–255] (byte)

Adjacent is displayed the color light khaki (also called khaki tan or just tan).

This is the web color called khaki in HTML/CSS.

=== Khaki ===
Khaki (A Dictionary of Color)

Color coordinates
- Hex triplet: #C3B091
- sRGB^{B} (r, g, b): (195, 176, 145)
- HSV (h, s, v): (37°, 26%, 76%)
- CIELCh_{uv} (L, C, h): (73, 28, 61°)
- ISCC–NBS descriptor: Grayish yellow
- B: Normalized to [0–255] (byte)

The color shown adjacent matches the color designated as khaki in the 1930 book A Dictionary of Color, the standard for color nomenclature before the introduction of computers. It corresponds to RAL 1001 Beige in the RAL color standard.

=== Dark khaki ===
Dark Khaki

Color coordinates
- Hex triplet: #BDB76B
- sRGB^{B} (r, g, b): (189, 183, 107)
- HSV (h, s, v): (56°, 43%, 74%)
- CIELCh_{uv} (L, C, h): (73, 52, 82°)
- Source: X11
- ISCC–NBS descriptor: Moderate greenish yellow
- B: Normalized to [0–255] (byte)

Adjacent is displayed the web color dark khaki. It corresponds to Dark Khaki in the X11 color names and to RAL 7008 Khaki Gray in the RAL color standard.

=== Khaki green ===
Khaki green

Color coordinates
- Hex triplet: #728639
- sRGB^{B} (r, g, b): (114, 134, 57)
- HSV (h, s, v): (76°, 57%, 53%)
- CIELCh_{uv} (L, C, h): (53, 48, 101°)
- Source: wikimix
- ISCC–NBS descriptor: Pale olive brown
- B: Normalized to [0–255] (byte)

Adjacent is displayed the color khaki green, sometimes called simply khaki in Commonwealth countries. It corresponds to RAL 6003 Olive Green in the RAL color standard. It is more commonly called olive green or olive drab.

== See also ==
- Feldgrau
- Khaki University
