= Board of Broadcast Governors =

Former Canadian broadcasting regulator

Agency overview
- Formed: 1958
- Dissolved: 1968

The Board of Broadcast Governors (BBG) was an arm's-length Government of Canada agency. It was created in 1958 by amending the Broadcast Act to regulate television and radio broadcasting, originally taking over that function from the CBC.

The BBG was replaced by the Canadian Radio-television and Telecommunications Commission in the 1968 amendments to the 1958 Act.

== Board ==
The board consisted of 12 members appointed by the federal government:

- 3 full-time members
- 9 part-time

The head of the board was the Governor.

There had only been two Chairmen:

- Dr. Andrew Stewart November 10, 1958 – March 18, 1968
- Pierre Juneau March 18–31, 1968

== History ==
In 1957, the Progressive Conservative party intended to change the makeup of the Canadian Broadcast system. Up to that point, the Canadian Broadcasting Corporation (CBC) had been responsible for maintaining broadcast infrastructures, creating programs, and regulating the industry. These roles described the CBC as being both "cop and competitor" and were argued to be separated. The regulatory function was thus given over to a separate regulatory agency, the BBG. through the passage of the Broadcast Act (1958).
