= Henry Marshall Tory =

Canadian academic (1864–1947)

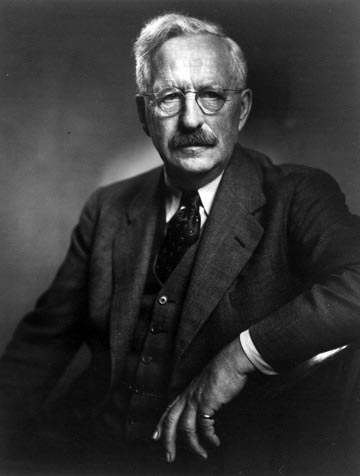

President of the University of Alberta
- In office 1908–1928
- Succeeded by: Robert C. Wallace

President of Carleton College
- In office 1942–1947
- Succeeded by: Murdoch Maxwell MacOdrum

Personal details
- Born: January 11, 1864 near Guysborough, Nova Scotia, British North America
- Died: February 6, 1947 (aged 83) Ottawa, Ontario, Canada
- Spouse: Annie Gertrude Frost
- Parent: Robert Kirk Tory (father)
- Relatives: James Cranswick Tory (Brother); Charles Tory Bruce (Nephew); John Stewart Donald Tory (Nephew)
- Education: McGill University

Military service
- Allegiance: Canada
- Branch/service: Canadian Expeditionary Force
- Years of service: 1916-1919
- Rank: Colonel
- Commands: Khaki University

Henry Marshall Tory (January 11, 1864 – February 6, 1947) was the first president of the University of Alberta (1908–1928), the first president of the Khaki University, the first president of the National Research Council (1928–1935), and the first president of Carleton College (1942–1947). His brother was James Cranswick Tory, Lieutenant Governor of Nova Scotia (1925–1930).

== Early life ==
Born on a farm near Guysborough, in Guysborough County, Nova Scotia, his mother was a major factor in his educational ambition. At 22, he registered for Honours Mathematics and Physics in 1886 at McGill University and received an Honours B.A. with gold medal in 1890, despite his mother's desire for him to attend Mount Allison University to study Arts and Theology.

After graduating, he studied theology and received a B.D. from Wesleyan College, affiliated with McGill. He spent the next two years preaching at a church. In 1893, he married Annie Gertrude Frost of Knowlton, Quebec.

== Career ==
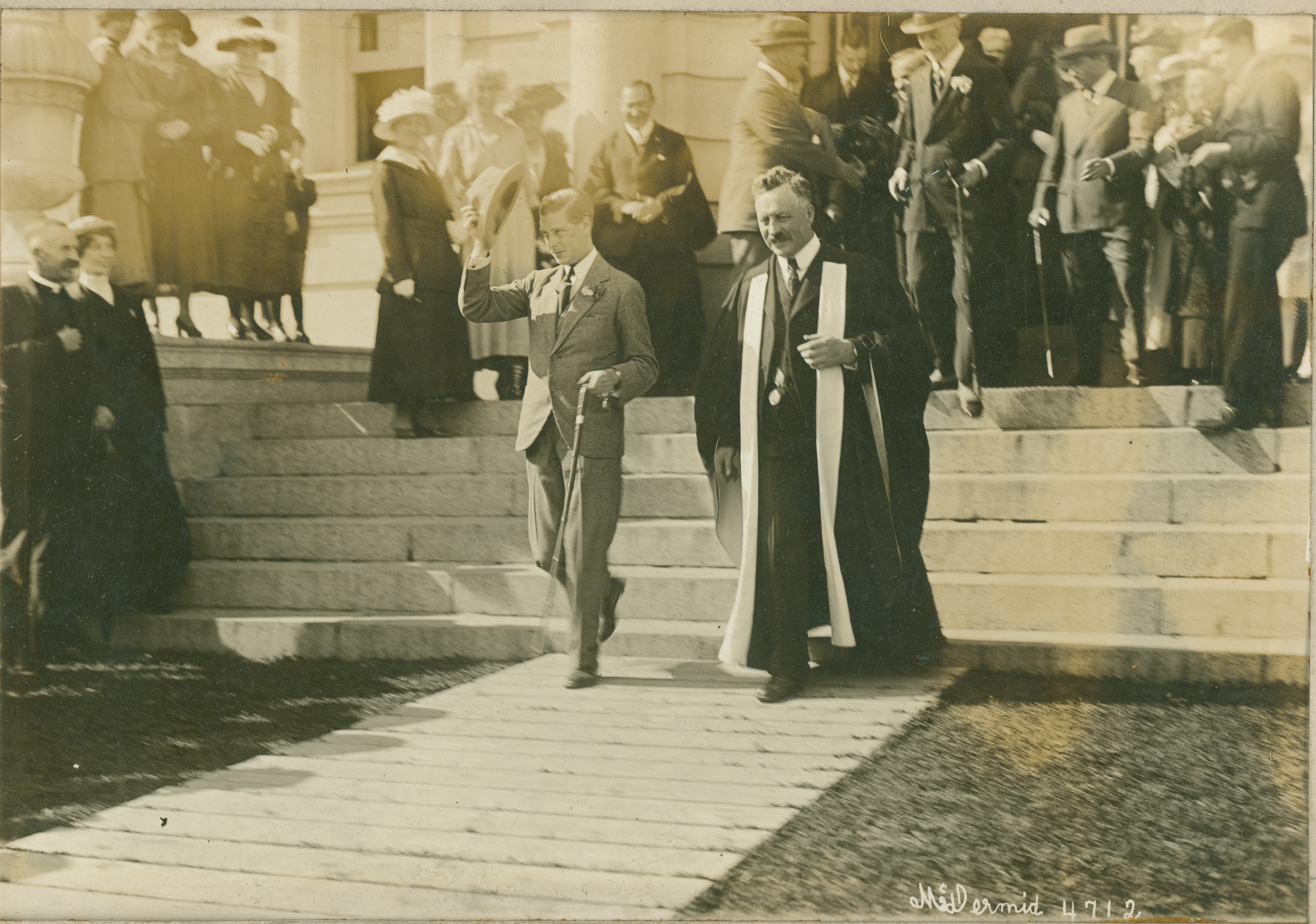
Edward, Prince of Wales with Tory in October 1919.

Tory became a lecturer in mathematics at McGill University in 1893, and he received an M.A. in Mathematics in 1896. He received a D.Sc. degree in 1903 and was promoted to associate professor of mathematics. In 1906, he set up the McGill University College of British Columbia which became the University of British Columbia in 1915. In 1905 during a stop in Edmonton, he had a chance meeting with Alexander Cameron Rutherford, future Premier of Alberta. The two quickly became friends and found they shared ideas concerning the importance of establishing new publicly funded and non-denominational universities in Canada. When Rutherford founded the University of Alberta two years later, he asked Tory to serve as president. He accepted and served in the position from 1908 to 1929. During World War I, Tory, initially somewhat reluctantly, became a colonel in the Canadian Expeditionary Force in 1916. After a tour of the front lines in France, he returned to England and proceeded to set up and run what came to be known as the Khaki University, enrolling over 50,000 Canadian student soldiers by the end of the Great War.

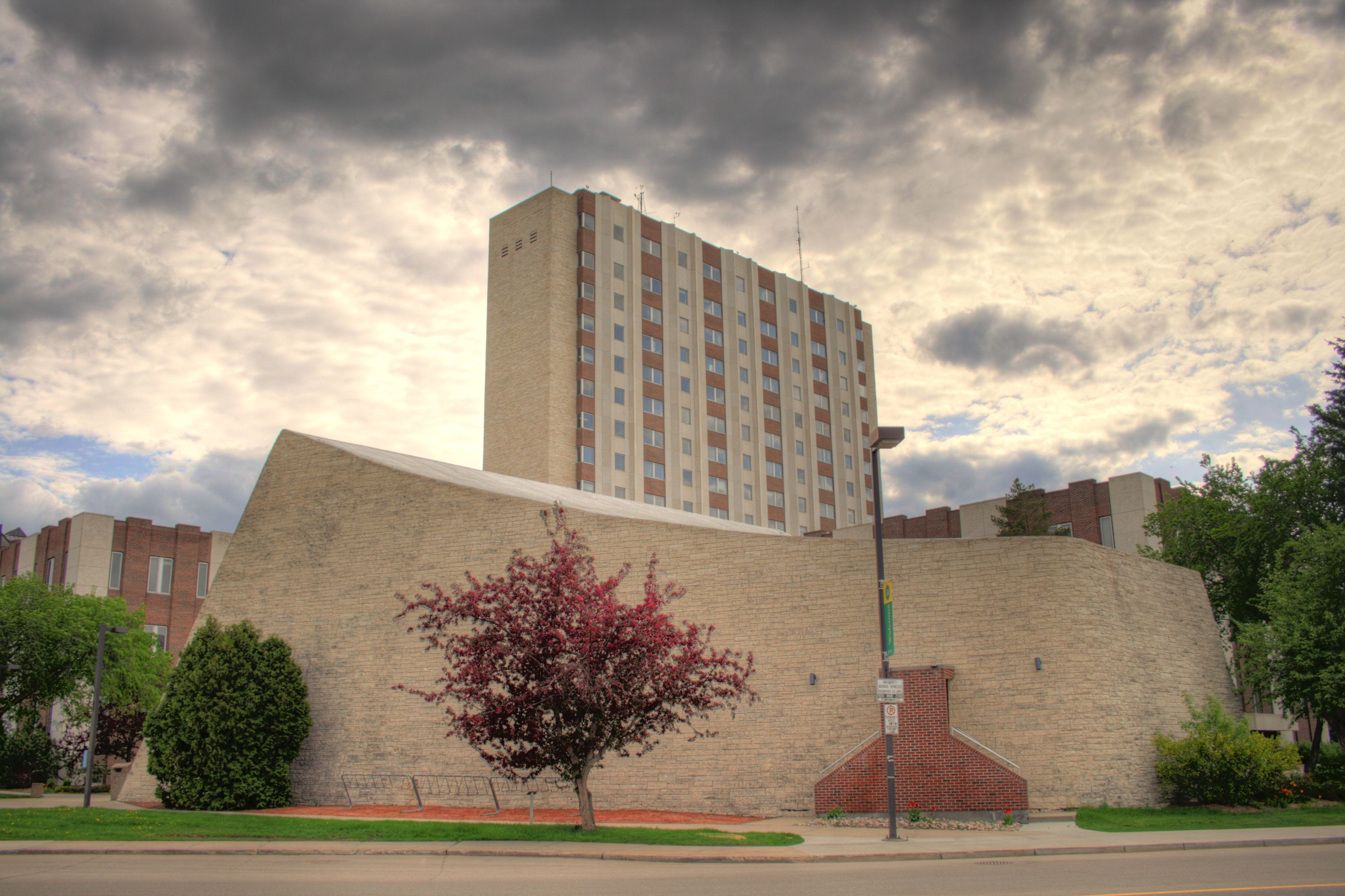
Tory Theatre at the University of Alberta

Tory returned to Alberta in 1919 and resumed his position as president of the University of Alberta. Nearing retirement, on June 1, 1928, he accepted an appointment as the first President of the Council and Chief Executive Officer of the National Research Laboratories (which was later called the National Research Council of Canada). Something of Tory's management style was described by Mel Thistle: "Having chosen his directors, Tory then set about filling, not the senior positions, but the junior posts. He knew that the best way was to use the top young people, with rapid promotions to fill the intermediated positions. In this he was aided by the accident of the depression, which made it possible for brilliant young people to be obtained for very small salaries."

From 1939 to 1940, he was president of the Royal Society of Canada, just after his wife's death in 1938. From 1942 until his death in 1947, he was the first president of Carleton College (which later became Carleton University).

== Legacy ==
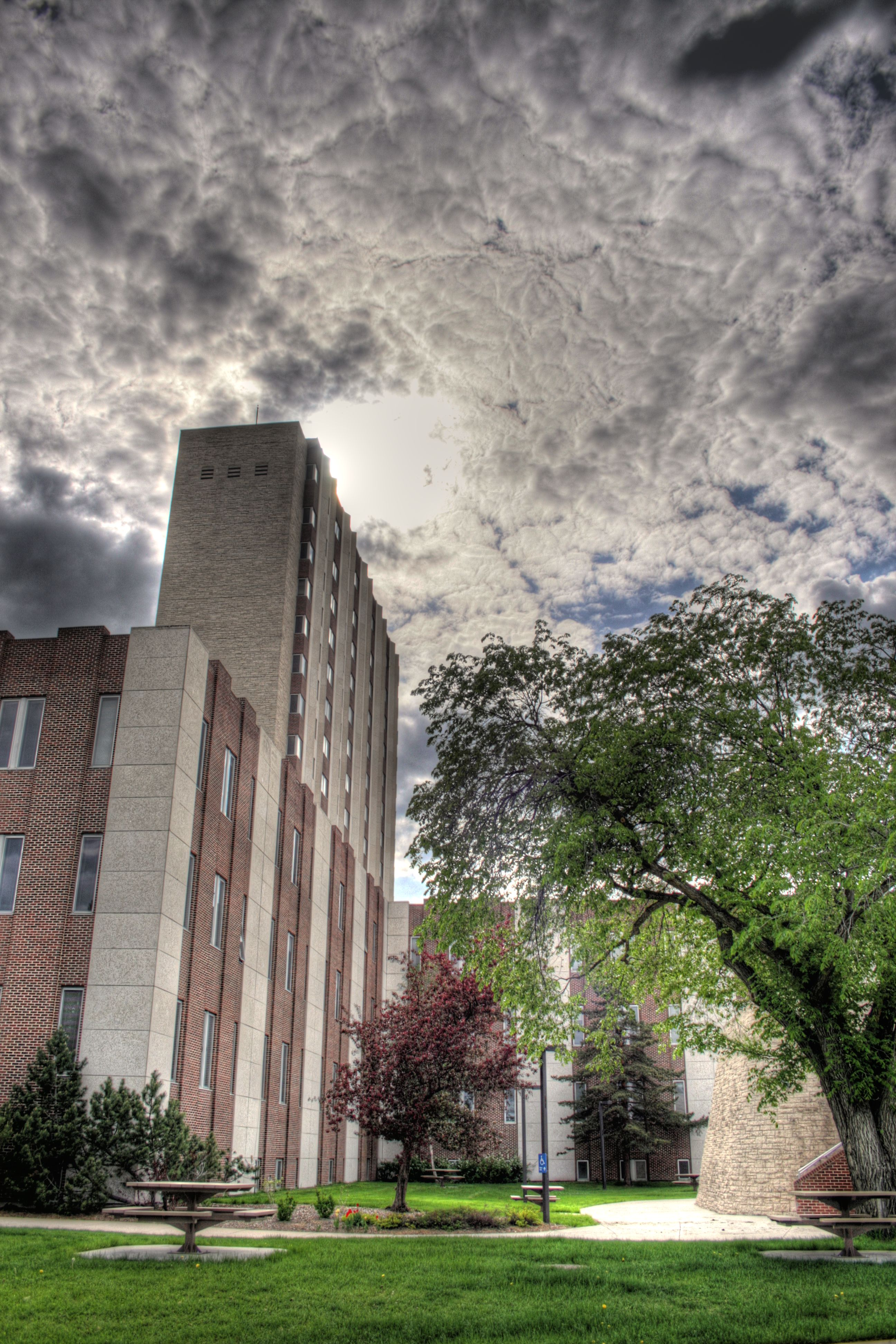
Tory building at the University of Alberta

The Henry Marshall Tory Building and the Tory Theatre at the University of Alberta were named in his honour, as was the Tory Building at Carleton University. The Henry Marshall Tory Medal at the University of British Columbia was established in 1941.

== University Histories ==
- William Hardy Alexander, The University of Alberta: A Retrospect 1908-1929
- Walter Johns, History of the University of Alberta
- John Macdonald, The History of the University of Alberta, 1908-1958
- Scott Rollans Echoes in the Halls: An Unofficial History of the University of Alberta (Association of Professors Emeriti of the U of A, University Of Alberta, 1999)
- Ellen Schoeck, I Was There: A Century of Alumni Stories about the University of Alberta, 1906–2006
- William C. Gibson Wesbrook & His University (Vancouver: University of British Columbia Press)
- George Woodcock & Tim Fitzharris. The University of British Columbia – A Souvenir. (Toronto: Oxford University Press, 1986).
- H. Blair Neatby Creating Carleton: The Shaping of a University (Montreal: McGill-Queen's University Press, October 1, 2002)
- Paul Axelrod Scholars and Dollars: Politics, Economics, and the Universities of Ontario 1945-1980 (Toronto: University of Toronto Press, September 1, 1982)

Academic offices
Preceded by New position	President of the University of Alberta; 1908–1928	Succeeded by Robert C. Wallace
Preceded by New position	President of Carleton University; 1942–1947	Succeeded by Murdoch Maxwell MacOdrum
Professional and academic associations
Preceded by Victor Morin	President of the Royal Society of Canada; 1939–1940	Succeeded by R. C. Wallace
