= Harry Gunning =

Canadian scientist (1916–2002)

Harry E. Gunning

President of the University of Alberta
- In office 1974–1979
- Preceded by: Max Wyman
- Succeeded by: Myer Horowitz

Personal details
- Born: December 16, 1916 Toronto, Ontario, Canada
- Died: November 24, 2002 (aged 85) Edmonton, Alberta, Canada
- Education: University of Toronto
- Occupation: chemist, professor, academic administrator

Harry Emmet Gunning, OC (December 16, 1916 – November 24, 2002) was a Canadian scientist and administrator.

Born in Toronto, Ontario, he received a Bachelor of Arts degree, a Master of Arts degree, and a Ph.D. in physical chemistry in 1942 from the University of Toronto.

In 1957, he was appointed Professor and Chairman of the Department of Chemistry at the University of Alberta. From 1974 to 1979, he was the President as well.

In 1979, he was made an Officer of the Order of Canada as a "scientist and educator, who has achieved an international reputation for chemical research".

== Career ==
Gunning attended the University of Toronto, and there he earned three degrees in physical chemistry; a BA Honors, an MA, and a PhD. He finished his schooling in 1942, when he earned his PhD. Next, he did post-doctoral studies at Harvard. After that, Gunning returned to Canada and became a research chemist in Dr. Edgar Steacie's laboratory in Ottawa. He also did research for the National Research council at the time. In 1946, he became a professor at the University of Rochester and then at the Illinois Institute of Technology. In 1957, he returned to Canada again and became Professor and Chair of the Department of Chemistry at the University of Alberta. He was very passionate about building up the department to much higher standards. In the next ten years, Gunning's work achieved the University's chemistry department international recognition and it became a rapidly evolving center for chemical studies. In 1973, a new wing was added to the Chemistry building to accommodate for the rapid growth of the department, under Gunning's supervision.

== Achievements/awards ==
Gunning's focuses were on chemical kinetics and photochemistry. He did much research in these areas and published over 175 research papers on these areas of chemistry. He became president of the Chemical Institute of Canada in 1973 and remained there until 1974. He was active in provincial, municipal, and federal commissions and boards, one of them being the Alberta Oil Sands Technology and Research Authority. Gunning became President of the University of Alberta in 1974. He was a strong president, introducing many innovative policies in science and administration. He also supported and promoted the interaction between academics, industry, and government in Canada. He also was an important role-player in research and development of Alberta's vast oil and sand resources. Not only did he do that, but he helped in developing Chem-Biomed Ltd and established the Edmonton Research and Development Park. Gunning received many awards in recognition of his vast achievements in the field of science and academia. He received the Chemical Institute of Canada Medal in 1967 and the Province of Alberta Achievement Award in 1971 as well as 1979. He also achieved six honorary degrees in total, and in 1979, he was appointed an Officer of the Order of Canada. On November 30, 2001, the University of Alberta's Chemistry Building was renamed the Gunning/Lemieux Chemistry Centre in honour of Harry Gunning as well as Raymond Urgel Lemieux, who were considered the department's two most distinguished chemists.

Academic offices
Preceded by Max Wyman	President of the University of Alberta; 1974–1979	Succeeded by Myer Horowitz
