= Murdoch Maxwell MacOdrum =

Canadian academic and clergyman (1901–1955)

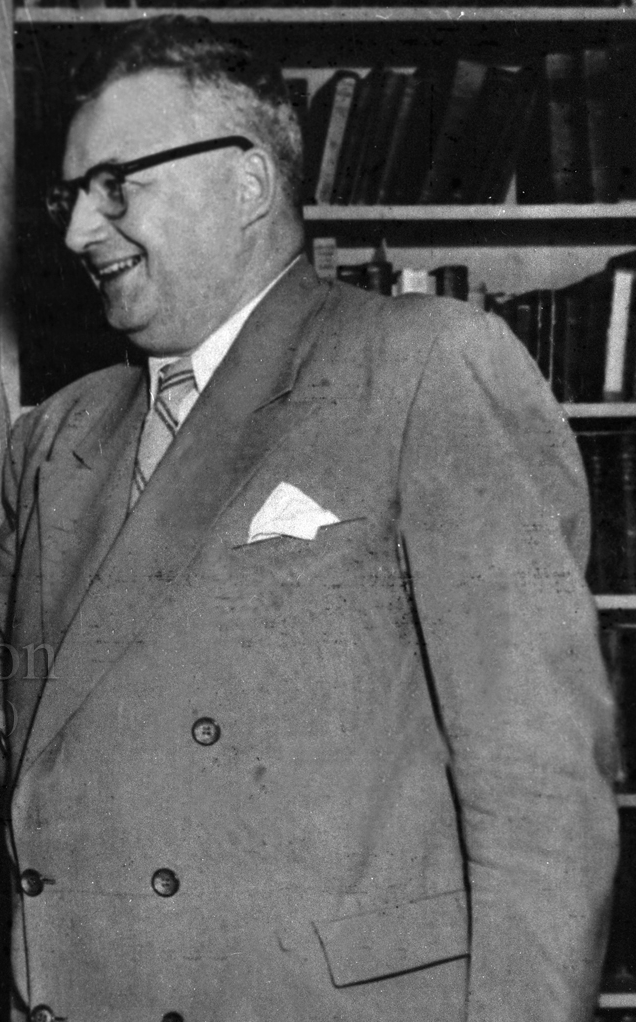
- Murdoch Maxwell MacOdrum in October 1951

President of Carleton College
- In office 1947–1955
- Preceded by: Henry Marshall Tory
- Succeeded by: James Alexander Gibson

Personal details
- Born: May 30, 1901 Marion Bridge, Nova Scotia
- Died: August 1, 1955 (aged 54) Cavendish, Prince Edward Island
- Education: Dalhousie University, McGill University, University of Glasgow

Murdoch Maxwell MacOdrum (May 30, 1901 – August 1, 1955) was a Canadian folk song scholar, Presbyterian minister, and the second president of Carleton College (later Carleton University) in Ottawa, Ontario.

Born in Marion Bridge, Nova Scotia, MacOdrum was the son of Rev. Donald MacOdrum, D.D., a Presbyterian minister who, at the time of his death in 1938, was Moderator of the General Assembly of the Presbyterian Church in Canada. The younger MacOdrum received a B.A. from Dalhousie University in 1923, an MA from McGill University in 1924, and a PhD in English from the University of Glasgow in 1927. His MA and PhD theses were both on the subject of Child ballads in Canada. He then attended Harvard University for a year of postdoctoral study in ballad literature, before being appointed as a lecturer at Dalhousie University, then Queen's University in Kingston, Ontario.

From 1932, MacOdrum studied at the Presbyterian College in Montreal, and in 1935 he was ordained as a minister at Bethel Presbyterian Church in Sydney, Nova Scotia, where he remained for four years.

MacOdrum left the ministry in 1939, and in 1940 became Assistant to the President of the Dominion Steel and Coal Corporation in Sydney, in charge of Industrial and Public Relations. In 1942, MacOdrum was called to Ottawa to join the staff for the National War Finance Committee. From there, he was recruited by Carleton College's founder and president, Henry Marshall Tory, to be his executive assistant and eventual successor. MacOdrum became president upon Tory's death in 1947.

MacOdrum successfully lobbied the Ontario government to give the young but as-yet-unrecognized college a charter and degree-granting powers, which it got in 1952. He also oversaw many of the land deals that would eventually lead to Carleton's move to a new Rideau River campus in 1958, though he died three years before that move actually took place. In his honour, the second building on the new campus was named the Maxwell MacOdrum Library. He died of a heart attack in 1955.

Upon his death, MacOdrum was succeeded by acting president James Alexander Gibson.
