= Algerian Petroleum Institute =

Algerian Petroleum Institute المعهد الجزائري للبترول
- Founded: 1965
- Headquarters: Boumerdès, Algeria
- Area served: Formation
- Key people: Salah Khebri
- Website: sonatrach.com

The Algerian Petroleum Institute (Arabic: المعهد الجزائري للبترول, French: Institut Algérien du Pétrole), is a national graduate institute of petroleum engineering located in Boumerdès, Algeria. Commonly known as "IAP", the school was established in 1965 in collaboration with the French Institute of Petroleum (French: Institut Français du Pétrole, IFP) with a mission of providing graduate engineers and high skilled technicians to Sonatrach, the national state-owned oil company of Algeria.

== See also ==
- Economy of Algeria
- Energy law
- Petroleum industry
- Sonatrach
