= W. John McDonald =

Canadian physicist (1936–2026)

President of the University of Alberta
- Acting
- In office July 1, 1994 – January 1, 1995
- Preceded by: Paul Davenport
- Succeeded by: Roderick D. Fraser

Personal details
- Born: September 29, 1936 Lethbridge, Alberta, Canada
- Died: January 17, 2026 (aged 89)
- Spouse: Wendy Macleod
- Education: University of Saskatchewan; University of Ottawa
- Scientific career
- Fields: sub-atomic physics
- Workplaces: University of Alberta
- Thesis: A study of the excited states in oxygen-16 and calcium-40 using 14.1 MeV neutrons (1964)
- Doctoral advisor: J.M. Robson

Wallace John McDonald (September 29, 1936 – January 17, 2026) was a Canadian physicist and academic administrator. He served as acting president of the University of Alberta from 1994 to 1995. He was educated at the University of Saskatchewan (BSc 1959, MSc 1961) and University of Ottawa (PhD 1964). A physicist, he specialized in sub-atomic physics and particle detection techniques. He joined the University of Alberta's Department of Physics in 1962 as a professor. From 1982 to 1992, he was the Dean of Science, and from 1991 to 1994, he was vice president (academic) of the university. He was made professor emeritus in 2002. He married Wendy Macleod in 1961 and has three children. He died on January 17, 2026, at the age of 89.
