= Walter H. Johns =

Canadian academic

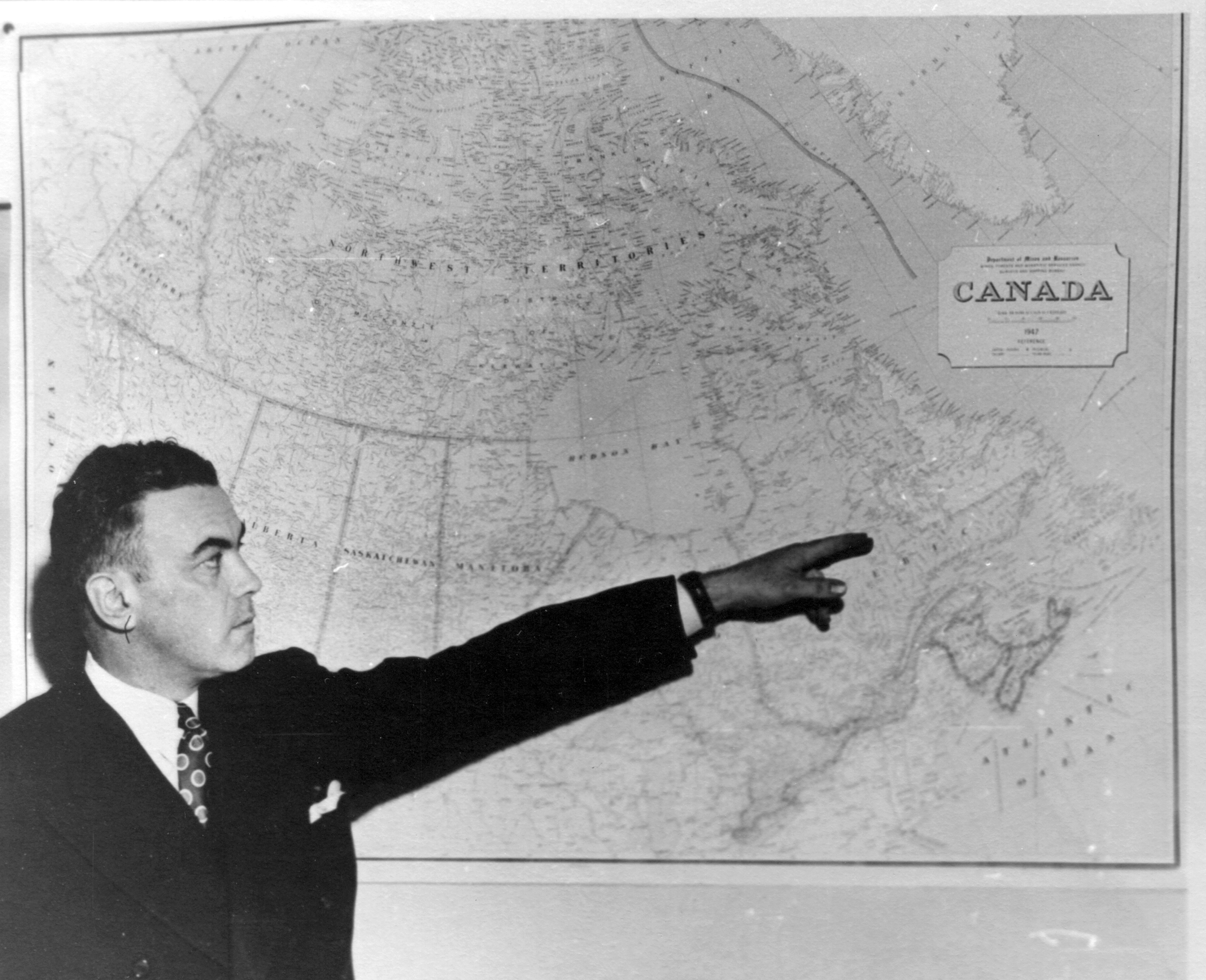

President of the University of Alberta
- In office 1959–1969
- Preceded by: Andrew Stewart
- Succeeded by: Max Wyman

Personal details
- Born: November 10, 1908 Exeter, Ontario
- Died: June 7, 1985 (aged 76) Edmonton, Alberta
- Education: University of Western Ontario; Cornell University
- Occupation: academic and academic administrator

Walter Hugh Johns, OC AOE (November 10, 1908 – June 7, 1985) was a Canadian academic and academic administrator.

Born near Exeter, Ontario, Johns earned a Bachelor of Arts in Classics from the University of Western Ontario in 1930 and a Ph.D. in Classics and Ancient History from Cornell University in 1934.

In 1938, Johns started teaching at the University of Alberta as a lecturer in Classics. Previously he taught at Victoria College, Cornell University and Waterloo College. From 1952 to 1957, he was Dean of Arts and Sciences. From 1957 to 1959, he was Vice-President (Academic) . He was President of the University of Alberta from 1959 to 1969.

He was the author of A History of the University of Alberta, 1908-1969.

In 1978, he was made an Officer of the Order of Canada "in recognition of his contribution to education, particularly at the University of Alberta". He was appointed a member of the Alberta Order of Excellence in 1982.
