= William Alexander Robb Kerr =

Canadian academic

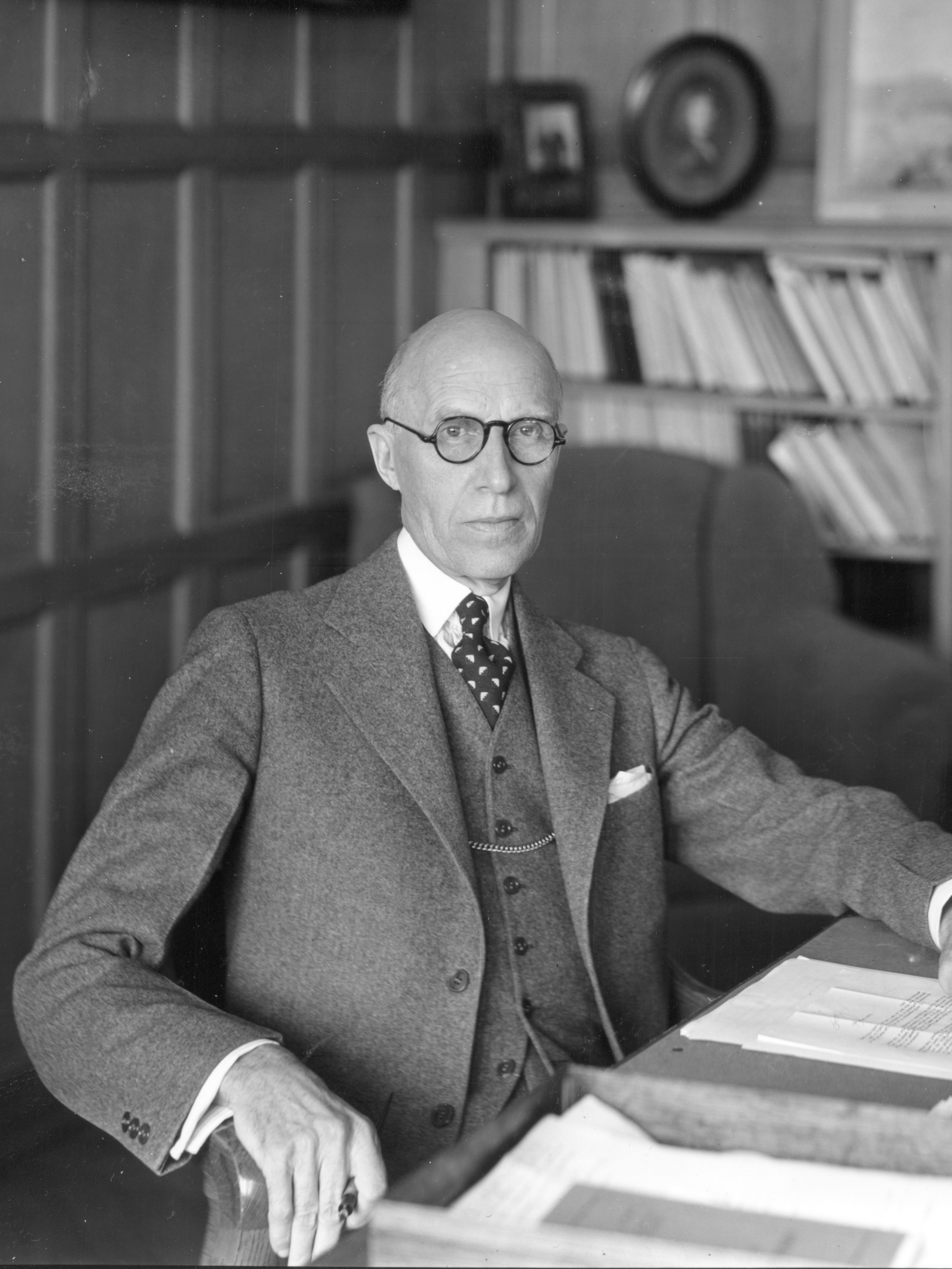

President of the University of Alberta
- In office 1936–1941
- Preceded by: Robert Charles Wallace
- Succeeded by: Robert Newton

Personal details
- Born: September 29, 1875 Toronto, Ontario, Canada
- Died: January 19, 1945 (aged 69) Edmonton, Alberta, Canada
- Education: University of Toronto; Harvard University; University of Paris
- Occupation: academic

William Alexander Robb Kerr, FRSC (September 29, 1875 – January 19, 1945) was a Canadian academic and the third president of the University of Alberta.

Born in Toronto, Ontario, to Thomas and Maria Jane Kerr, Kerr received a Bachelor of Arts degree in 1899 and a Master of Arts degree in 1901 from the University of Toronto. Continuing his education, he received an AM degree from Harvard University in 1902, an ET from the University of Paris in 1903, and a Ph.D. from Harvard University in 1904. In 1904, he was appointed a professor of Romance languages and literature at Adelphi College in Brooklyn, New York. In 1909, he joined the University of Alberta as a professor of modern languages. From 1914 to 1936, he was the first dean of the Faculty of Arts. From 1936 to 1941, he was the president of the University of Alberta.

He was a Fellow of the Royal Society of Canada.

He died in Edmonton, Alberta in 1945.
