= Bill Flanagan (academic) =

Canadian academic

14th President of the University of Alberta
- Incumbent
- Assumed office July 1, 2020
- Preceded by: David H. Turpin

Personal details
- Born: 1960 or 1961 (age 65–66) Edmonton, Alberta, Canada
- Spouse: Saffron Sri
- Relations: Jack Horner (uncle); Hugh Horner (uncle); Norval Horner (uncle); Doug Horner (cousin)
- Education: Carleton University (BA); University of Toronto (JD); University of Paris (MAS); Columbia University (LLM)

William F. Flanagan (born 1960) is a Canadian academic. In March 2020, his appointment was announced as the next president of the University of Alberta, succeeding David H. Turpin in July 2020. He previously served as the dean of the faculty of law at Queen's University from to 2005 to 2019.

Flanagan is married to his husband, Saffron Sri, who is originally from Sri Lanka.

== Early life and career ==
Flanagan was born in Edmonton, Alberta, the son of two teachers. In his teen years, he worked as a page in the Canadian House of Commons, where his maternal uncle Jack Horner was a Member of Parliament. He attended Carleton University where he earned a Bachelor of Arts degree, then the University of Toronto Faculty of Law, earning a J.D. degree in 1985. He also earned a DEA from the University of Paris in 1986 and a master's degree in law from Columbia Law School in 1989. In 1987, he served as a law clerk for Supreme Court of Canada justice Willard Estey. He joined Queen's University's faculty of law in 1991, serving as the law school's dean from 2005 to 2018. He taught international trade and investment, property law and corporate law, and founded the International Law Spring Program at the International Study Centre in the United Kingdom at Queen's University.

== Response to 2024 pro-Palestinian protests ==
On May 9, 2024, an encampment was organized by The People's University for Palestine was established on the University of Alberta main quad in solidarity with international student protests against the Israeli actions during the Gaza war (and since the 1948 Nakba) which has been characterized as a genocide.

A May 9th communication by President and Vice Chancellor Bill Flanagan reinforced the university's commitment to freedom of expression including non-violent protest and dissent as “foundations of the university”. This memo also indicated that the university would not tolerate any violation of law or university policies, such as hate speech or violence.

On May 10th, Campus Security visited the encampment and read a notice of trespass and eviction. Video evidence shows that Frank Page, head of Campus Security, announced a ban of all encampment participants from the University of Alberta campus for the period of a year.

In the early morning of May 11th, a day after the encampment participants had been given notice of trespass and eviction, the Edmonton Police Service (EPS) was deployed against the encampment. Protestors alleged violence on the part of the EPS officers.

Shortly after the dispersal of encampment-goers, Bill Flanagan released a May 11th statement citing the possibility of “serious violence” instigated by counter-protestors.

Criticism from across the University of Alberta community against Bill Flanagan were launched as a result of these events. In response, Bill Flanagan released a May 12th communication acknowledging the criticism but reiterating his belief that the action taken had been necessary.
