= Myer Horowitz =

Canadian academic administrator (1932–2022)

Myer Horowitz OC

President of the University of Alberta
- In office 1979–1989
- Preceded by: Harry Gunning
- Succeeded by: Paul Davenport

Personal details
- Born: December 27, 1932 Montreal, Quebec, Canada
- Died: October 24, 2022 (aged 89) Victoria, British Columbia, Canada
- Education: McGill University; Sir George Williams College; University of Alberta; Stanford University

Myer Horowitz OC (December 27, 1932 – October 24, 2022) was a Canadian academic who served as the ninth president of the University of Alberta from 1979 to 1989.

== Early life and education ==
Horowitz was born in Montreal, Quebec on December 27, 1932. He attended the School for Teachers at McGill University and received his BA at Sir George Williams College in 1956. He earned a Master of Education from the University of Alberta in 1959 and a Doctor of Education from Stanford University in 1965.

== Academic career ==
Horowitz taught for eight years in Montreal before accepting a position as a professor in the Faculty of Education at McGill University. He left McGill in 1969 to Alberta, where he accepted a position of Chair of the University of Alberta's Department of Elementary Education. He would later go on to serve various other academic positions in the University of Alberta: Dean of the Faculty of Education (1972–1975) and vice-president (Academic) (1975–1979).

Horowitz became the ninth president of the University of Alberta on August 1, 1979, succeeding Harry Gunning. He became known for his advocation for widely accessible early childhood services - something that he continued to fight for after his retirement as president in 1989, fighting against the Alberta government's decision to reduce funding for kindergartens. He was succeeded as president by Paul Davenport.

He became the professor emeritus of Education in 1989 and President Emeritus in 1999 in the U of A. He moved to Victoria, British Columbia in 1998 and became the adjunct professor of education at the University of Victoria. He was also involved with the University of Victoria's Centre for Youth and Society and Centre for Early Childhood Research and Policy.

== Personal life and death ==
Horowitz was made an officer of the Order of Canada in 1990, and has received nine honorary doctorate degrees. The Myer Horowitz Theatre on the University of Alberta Campus is named in his honour.

Horowitz died on October 24, 2022, at the age of 89.

Academic offices
Preceded by Harry Gunning	President of the University of Alberta; 1979–1989	Succeeded by Paul Davenport
