= Robert Newton (Canadian academic administrator) =

Canadian biochemist (1889–1985)

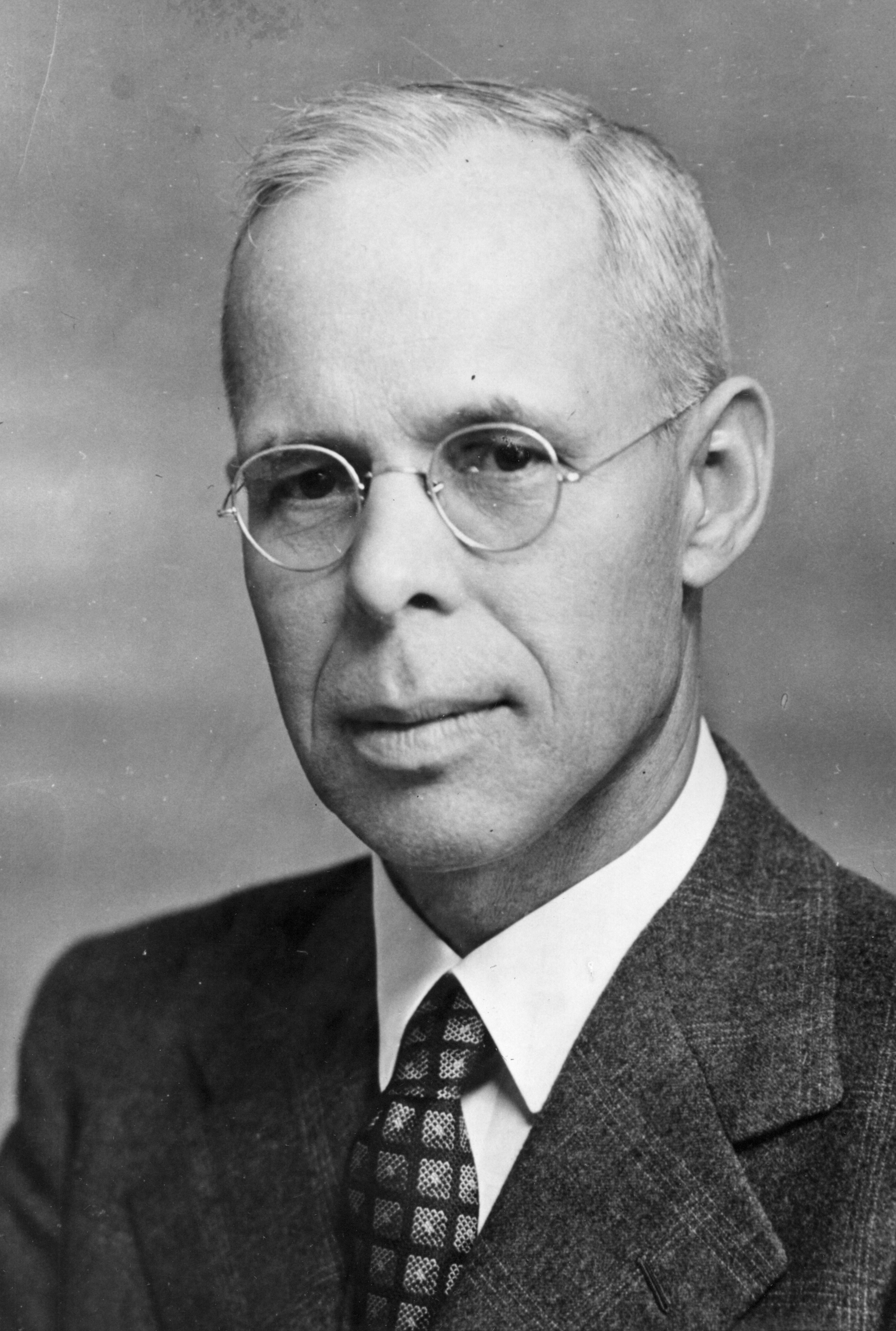

President of the University of Alberta
- In office 1941–1950
- Preceded by: William A. R. Kerr
- Succeeded by: Andrew Stewart

Personal details
- Born: February 7, 1889 Montreal, Quebec, Canada
- Died: November 22, 1985 (aged 96) Laguna Hills, California, United States
- Education: McGill University; University of Manitoba; University of Alberta
- Occupation: Plant biochemist, professor, academic administrator

Robert Newton (February 7, 1889 – November 22, 1985) was a Canadian biochemist and academic administrator. Newton attended McGill University (BSc 1912), the University of Manitoba (1921 MSc, 1923 PhD), and University of Alberta (DSc). He was a veteran of World War I. In 1919, he became professor of field husbandry at the University of Alberta. He later was professor of plant biochemistry in the Department of Field Crops, and head of the Department of Field Crops from 1924 to 1932. Newton took a leave to become the head of the Applied Biology Section of the National Research Council in Ottawa, but returned to the University in 1941 to become Dean of Agriculture, which he served until he was named president of the university. He retired in 1950 to the Pacific Coast of Canada, and died in California in 1985.

He was the younger brother of Margaret Newton.
