= Roderick D. Fraser =

11th President of the University of Alberta
- In office January 1, 1995 – June 30, 2005
- Preceded by: W. John McDonald (acting)
- Succeeded by: Indira Samarasekera

Personal details
- Born: July 23, 1940 (age 86) Vegreville, Alberta, Canada
- Education: University of Alberta; London School of Economics

Roderick D. Fraser (born July 23, 1940) is a Canadian academic. He served as president of the University of Alberta from 1995 to 2005. Fraser is currently a member of the Aga Khan University Board of Trustees. He is also a member of the Order of Canada and Order of the Rising Sun (2006).

Fraser attended the University of Alberta, where he got a Bachelor of Arts degree and master's degree in economics. He received his Ph.D from the London School of Economics in 1965. Prior to serving as president of the University of Alberta, he taught economics at Queen's University.
