= Indira Samarasekera =

Sri Lankan engineer

Indira Samarasekera OC
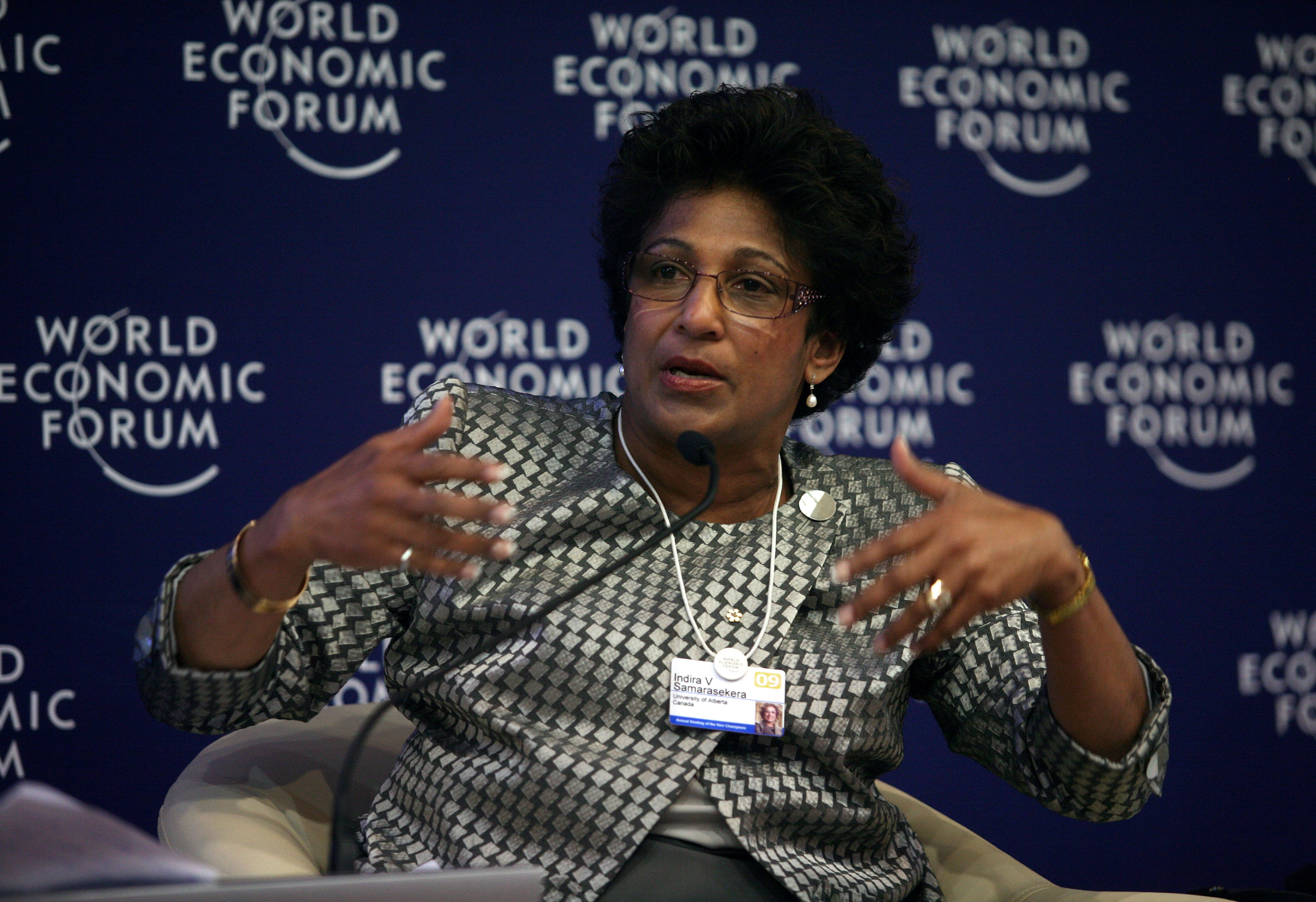
- Indira V. Samarasekera at the World Economic Forum, Annual Meeting of the New Champions, 2009

12th President and Vice-Chancellor of the University of Alberta
- In office 1 July 2005 – 30 June 2015
- Preceded by: Roderick D. Fraser
- Succeeded by: David Turpin

Personal details
- Born: April 11, 1952 (age 74) Colombo, Sri Lanka
- Spouse: Sam Samarasekera
- Education: University of Sri Lanka; University of California, Davis; University of British Columbia
- Salary: CA$546,236.90 (2015) CA$538,174.97 (2016) CA$267,179.57 (2017)
- Scientific career
- Fields: Metallurgy
- Workplaces: University of British Columbia; University of Alberta
- Thesis: Thermal distortion of continuous casting moulds (1980)

Indira Vasanti Samarasekera OC (née Arulpragasam; April 11, 1952) is the former president and former vice-chancellor of the University of Alberta. She has been a member of the Independent Advisory Board for Senate Appointments, which advises on appointments to the Senate of Canada, since 2016.

== Biography ==
Samarasekera was born in Colombo, Sri Lanka, of Sri Lankan Tamil descent, and was married to a Sinhalese, Sam Samarasekera and was divorced when her children were 7 and 3 years.

== Education and career ==
Samarasekera received her B.Sc. in Mechanical Engineering from the University of Sri Lanka in 1974 and an M.S. in Mechanical Engineering from the University of California, Davis as a Fulbright Scholar in 1976. In 1977, she immigrated to Canada, where she received her PhD in Metallurgical Engineering at the University of British Columbia in 1980. That year, she began working in the Department of Metals and Materials Engineering at UBC with a focus on the continuous casting and hot rolling of steel. She was only the second woman appointed to the University of British Columbia's Faculty of Engineering.

In 2000, she was appointed UBC's vice-president of research. During her time in that role, the university's research funding from government, private donors and industry more than doubled, from $149 million to $377 million.

She succeeded Roderick Fraser as president and vice-chancellor of the University of Alberta on July 1, 2005, and served two terms, ending June 30, 2015. She was the first female president of any university in Alberta.

As of July 1, 2015, she was succeeded by David Turpin as president of the University of Alberta.

== Awards and honorary degrees ==
In 1991, Samarasekera was awarded NSERC's the E.W.R. Steacie Fellowship, an award that recognizes promising young Canadian researchers. In 2002, she was made an Officer of the Order of Canada. In 2012, she received Canada's Public Policy Forum Peter Lougheed award for leadership in public policy, and the Queen Elizabeth II Diamond Jubilee Medal. In 2014, she was named a Foreign Associate of the National Academy of Engineering.

Samarasekera has received honorary degrees from the University of British Columbia, University of Toronto, the University of Waterloo, Queen's University Belfast, Université de Montréal and the University of Western Ontario.

In 2018 Samarasekera was awarded the Bessemer Gold Medal by the Institute of Materials, Minerals and Mining, an annual honour named after Sir Henry Bessemer awarded for outstanding services to the steel industry.

== Board and committee service ==
Samarasekera was appointed to the board of directors for Scotiabank in 2008, and for Magna International in 2014. She was appointed chair of the Worldwide Universities Network in 2012, serves on the CEO of the Year Advisory Committee and has served as both board member and chair of the National Institute for Nanotechnology (NINT).

Samarasekera is on the board of directors of TC Energy, owner of the Keystone Pipeline, appointed in 2016.

She has served as a member of Canada's Science, Technology and Innovation Council (STIC), the Prime Minister's Advisory Committee on the Public Service, the Conference Board of Canada and the Public Policy Forum.

From 2010 to 2012, she attended the World Economic Forum in Davos and has participated as either a speaker or a moderator.

== Public profile ==
In July 2009, the University of Alberta purchased Samarasekera's private residence for $930,000, representing approximately $180,000 profit for Samarasekera, and the home was renovated by the university. University administration was criticized by some for the initiative, given budget shortfalls at the time. Brian Heidecker, chair of the University of Alberta's Board of Governors, said the purchase gave the university a strategic advantage, noting that the residence would serve as a strong inducement when recruiting future presidents. Samarasekera continues to live at the home and pays rent based on fair market value.

In an interview with the Edmonton Journal on October 21, 2009, Samarasekera raised her concerns regarding the fact that 58% of university undergraduates in Canada were female. She commented, "I'm going to be an advocate for young white men, because I can be. No one is going to question me when I say we have a problem", and "We'll wake up in 20 years and we will not have the benefit of enough male talent at the heads of companies and elsewhere." A group of students responded by putting up posters satirizing her comments. Campus Security took down the posters within 24 hours and warned the students responsible of possible disciplinary action." Samaraskera responded by noting that she appreciated satire as a form of freedom of speech, but hoped that such debate be held in a cordial and respectable manner.

In the wake of deep government cuts to the cuts to the Alberta post-secondary sector in 2013, debate ensued on and off campus as to how the university should respond. Samarasekara undertook to limit her international travel. However, when invited by Alberta Premier Alison Redford, she travelled to China in September 2013 at a cost of $13,800. Responding to criticism, Samarasekara stated "people will find reasons to criticize me whichever way I do it."

== Sources ==
- University of Alberta bio information
- Rising Up Against Rankings by Indira Samaasekera, Inside Higher Ed, April 2, 2007.
- http://scotiabank.com/cda/content/0,1608,CID12292_LIDen,00.html
- https://www.cbc.ca/news/canada/edmonton/u-of-a-students-could-face-new-570-fee-1.924947
- https://web.archive.org/web/20100226022300/http://www.edmontonjournal.com/administrators+face+furloughs+salary+cuts/2333907/story.html

Academic offices
Preceded by Roderick D. Fraser	12th President of the University of Alberta; 2005–2015	Succeeded by David Turpin
