= Andrew Stewart (economist) =

Canadian economist (1904–1990)

President of the University of Alberta
- In office 1950–1959
- Preceded by: Robert Newton
- Succeeded by: Walter H. Johns

Personal details
- Born: January 18, 1904 Edinburgh, Scotland
- Died: July 14, 1990 (aged 86) Victoria, British Columbia, Canada
- Education: University of Manitoba; East of Scotland College of Agriculture
- Occupation: Professor, academic administrator

Andrew Stewart (January 18, 1904 – July 14, 1990) was a Canadian academic and economist.

== Early life ==
Stewart was born in Scotland and educated at the East of Scotland College of Agriculture and University of Manitoba.

== Career ==
Stewart served as president of the University of Alberta from 1950 to 1959. Stewart was previously a professor of political economy, director of the school of commerce, and dean of business affairs at the university. From 1959 to 1969, he was chair of the Board of Broadcast Governors (predecessor to the Canadian Radio-television and Telecommunications Commission), and served in this capacity as host of the 14th Canadian Film Awards in 1962. He was also one of the founders of the University of Ibadan in Nigeria.
