= Paul Davenport =

Canadian economist (born 1946)

Paul Davenport OC

9th President and Vice-Chancellor of the University of Western Ontario
- In office July 1, 1994 – July 1, 2009
- Preceded by: George Pedersen
- Succeeded by: Amit Chakma

10th President of the University of Alberta
- In office 1989–1994
- Preceded by: Myer Horowitz
- Succeeded by: W. John McDonald (acting)

Personal details
- Born: Paul Theodore Davenport; December 24, 1946 (age 79) Summit, New Jersey, United States
- Education: Stanford University; University of Toronto
- Occupation: economist, academic administrator

Academic background
- Thesis: Capital accumulation and economic growth (1976)
- Doctoral advisor: D.M. Nowlan

Academic work
- Discipline: Economics
- Institutions: McGill University; University of Alberta; University of Western Ontario

Paul Theodore Davenport, OC (born December 24, 1946) was the tenth president of the University of Alberta and ninth president of the University of Western Ontario.

Born and raised in Summit, New Jersey, he graduated magna cum laude from Stanford University in 1969 with a BA in economics. He moved to Canada and earned an MA and Ph.D in economics from the University of Toronto.

From 1973 until 1989, he taught economics at McGill University and from 1986 to 1989, he was Vice Principal for Planning & Computer Services. He served as president of the University of Alberta from 1989 until 1994, and became president of the University of Western Ontario on July 1, 1994. Davenport's tenure as President of the University of Alberta was tumultuous. Several years into his term, during a period of tight provincial budgets, he sought to close the Faculty of Dentistry and drop the Football program. These controversial proposals proved unpopular and brought resistance on many fronts, including that of the university's Board of Governors, and he was not offered a second term.

He has honorary degrees from the University of Alberta (1994), the University of Toronto (2000), and the International University of Moscow (2002). He was made a Chevalier de la Légion d'honneur in 2001, one of only a few foreigners to be awarded this honour. He was also named an Officer of the Order of Canada in 2002. Among UWO students, especially the student newspaper The Gazette, he was often referred to as "the French knight."

He is a member of the economics department at UWO and continues to supervise theses and publish articles. His term ended 2009, making him only the third president of Western to serve longer than ten years. He was succeeded by Amit Chakma.

Davenport is the chair of the board of governors of the University of Rwanda, and is also a member of Rwandan president Paul Kagame's Presidential Advisory Council.

Academic offices
Preceded by Myer Horowitz	10th President of the University of Alberta; 1989-1994	Succeeded by W. John McDonald (acting)
Preceded by George Pedersen	9th President of the University of Western Ontario; 1994-2009	Succeeded by Amit Chakma
