= So You Think You Can Dance Canada (season 2) finalists =

This is a list of finalists for season two of So You Think You Can Dance Canada, which aired in Canada in 2009. The winner was Tara-Jean Popowich. Other finalists included Emanuel Sandhu and Everett Smith.

== Corynne Barron ==
Corynne Barron 18, from Edmonton, Alberta is a classical contemporary dancer. Corynne has a pretty athletic background, including ringette, soccer, and track & field (hurdles). She believes that the 8–10 hours of daily dancing she did in England last year has prepped her for this competition. She was eliminated in Week 5.

== Nicolas Begin ==
Nicolas Begin 24, from Quebec City, Quebec is a b-boy/hip hop dancer. Nicolas identifies with Miles Faber from Season 1 as a B-Boy and says that he'll bring tons of energy to the show. He's nervous about being on TV, but his dream job is performing with a big artist like Justin Timberlake. He was eliminated in week 3. He, along with season one finalist Vincent Noiseux, was runner-up with Blueprint Cru on season 5 of America's Best Dance Crew.

== Cody Bonnell ==
Cody Bonnell 19, from Unionville, Ontario is a hip hop dancer. Cody owns over 50 pairs of shoes. He wore his favorite pair to the Montreal audition: Kanye West-designed sneakers. He's also trained in tap, jazz, and ballet, and used to play hockey. He was eliminated in week 7.

== Melanie Buttarazzi ==
Melanie Buttarazzi 22, from Woodbridge, Ontario is a Latin/ballroom dancer. Aside from her dance training, Melanie has been studying kinesiology, which helps her understand how her body works. She says she's always been the underdog and is excited to show Canada how hard she can work and that she can be the best. She was eliminated in week 2.

== Jayme Rae Dailey ==
Jayme Rae Dailey 21, from Montreal, Quebec is a contemporary dancer. She has a twin sister so she says it will be weird being without her during the competition, since they generally do everything together. She says she's got a “spicy flavor” and looks forward to bringing it to the stage. To prepare, she's been taking as many classes as she can in as many genres as she can. It helps that her dad built her and her sister a studio in the basement.

== Vincent Desjardins ==
Vincent Desjardins 20, from Trois-Rivières, Quebec is a ballroom dancer. Vincent owes a lot to his sister as he wouldn't have been a dancer if it was not for her. He's performed in ballroom competitions in several major cities and his family is super important to him as a support network. His motto is “Dream to catch the sun - worse comes to worst, you’ll catch a star.” His favorite dance movie is Dance with Me.

== Austin Di Iulio ==
Austin Di Iulio 19, from Mississauga, Ontario is a contemporary dancer. Although he has come in as a contemporary dancer, he is looking forward to hip hop and nervous about learning ballroom. He plays soccer and is also studying to be an aerospace engineer. He says that math and sciences are his forte but is totally up for being in the entertainment world for a while before returning to finish his degree. He was eliminated in week 6, becoming the first male individual to be eliminated from the Top 10.

== Daniel Dory ==
Daniel Dory 23, from Montreal, Quebec is a hip hop/house dancer. Daniel wants to challenge himself and hopes to kick off the competition with contemporary or ballroom. He was born in Port-au-Prince, Haiti, but grew up in Montreal. He juggles dance with his studies in Finance and his dream job is going on tour with Beyoncé. He was eliminated in week 5.

== Amy Gardner ==
Amy Gardner 21, from Calgary, Alberta is a contemporary dancer. Amy grew up in Calgary but has since moved to Vancouver to further her dance career. She often visits her aunt and uncle in Mission, BC. She has a few tattoos. One of a small dot on her wrist that reminds her that “in the grand scheme of things, most things are quite small.” She's also got one of a jagged heart tattoo on the back of her neck that represents self-love. She is part of the group, Pinup Saints with last year's winner Nico. She was eliminated in week 6, becoming the first female individual to be eliminated from the Top 10.

== Kim Gingras ==
Kim Gingras 23, from Montreal, Quebec is a hip hop dancer. She (literally) has a jaw dropping story: she took part in Season 1 auditions, but since then has had jaw surgery. She dated Season 1's Top 8 dancer Vincent Noiseux and he has been there to help her prepare for the stress that the competition brings. She was eliminated in week 7. Kim, alongside Vincent and Nicholas Begin of the Top 20, are part of another group, Blueprint Cru, which came in second on America's Best Dance Crew. She was unable to participate on the show because she was involved with the Top 10 Canadian tour at the time. Danced behind Nicole Scherzinger on So You Can Think You Can Dance(US) result show 2011.07.14. She is now a dancer for Beyoncé, appearing in several of the videos for her 2013 self-titled album, and principal dancer on The Mrs. Carter Show World Tour.

== Anthony Grafton ==
Anthony Grafton 24, from Calgary, Alberta is a ballroom dancer. Anthony looks forward to working with the great choreographers on the show, especially Mia Michaels and can't wait to build stories with his partner on stage. He has a miniature dachshund named Jackson. He was eliminated in week 2.

== Jenna Lynn Higgins ==
Jenna Lynn Higgins 18, from Toronto, Ontario is a jazz/lyrical dancer. Jenna Lynn is also an accomplished ballet dancer and loves track & field. Jenna Lynn's got the piercings. She has her tongue, nose, ears and belly button pierced. She was eliminated in week 3.

== Taylor James ==
Taylor James 22, from Vancouver, British Columbia is a Contemporary and Hip Hop dancer. On top of being a dancer and choreographer, Taylor is also a professional photographer. His work can be seen in various magazines and agencies across Canada and he is never without his camera. He has danced in various movies and televisions shows including Another Cinderella Story, Fantastic Four 2, The L Word, and has been in music videos for Blake McGrath "The Night" and Lady Sovereign "I Got You Dancing" (in which he also was the choreographer). He can also be seen as a panelist on the show, 1 Girl 5 Gays.

== Danny Lawn ==
Danny Lawn 21, from Brockville, Ontario is a contemporary dancer. Danny comes from a pretty athletic family that is involved in basketball, running, baseball, and working out, which he feels have only helped his dancing. He's a jumper and loves turning switch splits and switch straddle jumps. He was eliminated in week 4.

== Natalie Lyons ==
Natalie Lyons 23, from Halifax, Nova Scotia is a hip hop/krump dancer. This energetic and strong krumper is used to performing in runners so she is certainly nervous about the transition to heels. Despite her niche, she is excited to learn styles she is not familiar with and hopes her opening routine is really emotional. She was eliminated in week 4.

== Melanie Mah ==
Melanie Mah 19, from Richmond Hill, Ontario is a contemporary dancer. Aside from Dance, Melanie following in her father's footsteps and studying physiology at the University of Western Ontario. Her father is a radiologist and that is essentially what she wants to be. Her strength is that she dances from the heart and hopes that her little quirks will set her apart. She was eliminated in week 8.

== Tatiana Parker ==
Tatiana Parker 21, from Toronto, Ontario is a hip hop dancer. Her dream job used to be to dance for Michael Jackson, but she also would want to dance for Missy Elliott and Janet Jackson. Although she is most passionate about hip-hop, she has taken contemporary classes and trained in other styles of dance. She was eliminated in week 1.

== Tara-Jean Popowich ==
Tara-Jean Popowich 20, from Lethbridge, Alberta is a contemporary dancer. She went across the country to get on the show: She's an Alberta native, but auditioned in Saint John, N.B. to get on the show because she had fractured her toe right before the Vancouver auditions. She dances and teaches at Harbour Dance in Vancouver. She won the second season of the show. Tara Jean has been in a number of music videos including Elise Estrada. She performed with Elise Estrada at the 2009 Juno Awards Gala Dinner. She has also participated in Indian Dancing Show Jhalak Dikhla Jaa Season 7. She was also a Convention teacher at Turn It Up dance competition in 2014.

== Emanuel Sandhu ==
Emanuel Sandhu 28, from Vancouver, British Columbia is a contemporary/ballet dancer as well as figure skater, and he is stoked about this dance competition. He's afraid of tap dancing, but in order to prep for this season, he's been taking classes and figure skating all summer. He was eliminated in week 8.

== Everett Smith ==
Everett Smith 25, from Glen Morris, Ontario is a tap dancer. Everett is seizing the opportunity that has been giving to him, after a close call car accident a few years back. He is looking forward to seeing his mom's face while he's on stage, as she has worked three jobs so that her son could dance.
