= Robert Charles Wallace =

Canadian geologist (1881–1955)

Robert C. Wallace CMG FRSC
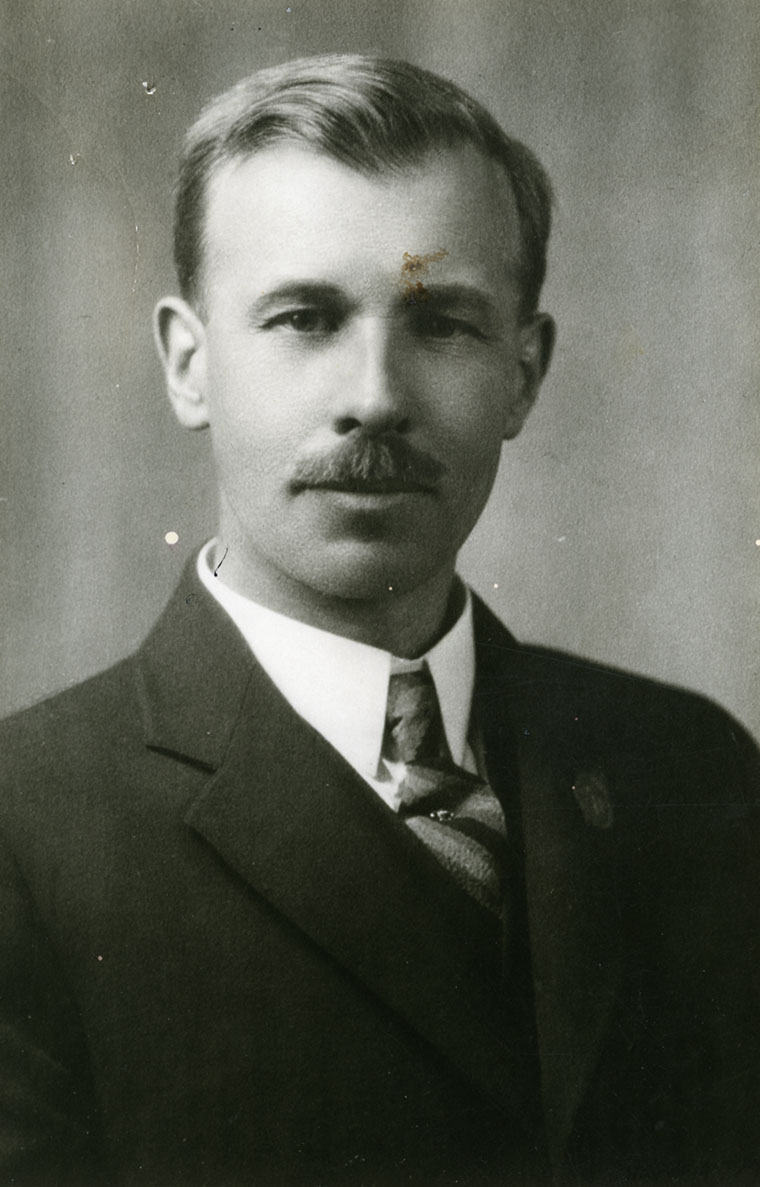

President of the University of Alberta
- In office 1928–1936
- Preceded by: Henry Marshall Tory
- Succeeded by: William A. R. Kerr

Principal of Queen's University
- In office 1936–1951
- Preceded by: William Hamilton Fyfe
- Succeeded by: William Archibald Mackintosh

Personal details
- Born: June 15, 1881 Orkney, Scotland
- Died: January 29, 1955 (aged 73) Kingston, Ontario, Canada
- Education: University of Edinburgh; University of Göttingen
- Occupation: geologist, educator, academic administrator

Robert Charles Wallace CMG FRSC (June 15, 1881 – January 29, 1955) was a Scots-Canadian geologist, educator, and administrator who served as president of the University of Alberta (1928–1936), the principal of Queen's University (1936–1951), and the head of the Arctic Institute of North America (1951–1955).

== Biography ==
=== Early life and education ===
Robert Charles Wallace was born on June 15, 1881, in the Orkney Islands of Scotland. He completed his secondary education at the Kirkwall Grammar School in Orkney funded by a county scholarship. He went on to earn a B.A. from the University of Edinburgh in 1901 and a B.Sc. in geology and mathematics from the same institution in 1907, during which time he received Exhibition Scholarship. Wallace left for Germany to pursue graduate studies in geology, obtaining an M.Sc. from the University of Göttingen. He returned to Scotland to finish his graduate work, earning his Ph.D. from Edinburgh in 1912. Later that year, Wallace married Elizabeth Harcus Smith (another Orcadian). She later became the founder and first president of the Faculty Women's Club at the University of Alberta (1933) and at Queen's University (1939). The pair had four children: Ronald, Sheila, Brenda, and Elspeth. The latter would become the last Dean of Women at Queen's.

=== Exploring Manitoba (1912–1928) ===
Increasingly renowned for his vast knowledge of rocks and minerals, Wallace moved to Canada in 1912 to take a position as the very first head of the Department of Geology and Mineralogy at the University of Manitoba, a position he held for nearly sixteen years (from 1912 to 1928). A charismatic and erudite professor, Wallace was held in high esteem by his students and colleagues. His legacy at the university can be still be seen today. In 1986, construction of the Wallace Building was completed on the University of Manitoba's Fort Garry Campus. The building, part of what is now the Department of Geological Sciences, contains the traditional classrooms and offices, as well as a seismographic data centre and a small geological museum.

In the midst of his tenure at the University of Manitoba, Wallace also became the Commissioner of Northern Manitoba at the behest of the provincial government. He traveled the north of the province extensively via foot, dogsled, and canoe, camping out with prospectors and explorers while documenting the extensive natural resources of the Canadian north. His reports on the plentiful mineral resources of Northern Manitoba resulted in the beginnings of government resource projects and the extensive infusion of capital into that region. The Manitoban Government later promoted Wallace to the position of Commissioner of Mines in 1927. He would occupy this post for less than a year, however, as his move to the University of Alberta came in 1928.

=== Further West: The Move to Alberta (1928–1936) ===
The University of Alberta was just beginning to establish itself as an important post-secondary institution when it offered Robert Wallace the presidency in 1928. Wallace was to succeed the university's first ever president, Henry Marshall Tory, who had left the institution to take a position as the president and CEO of the National Research Laboratories (later called the National Research Council of Canada). When Wallace arrived, the university was nearing the end of its first period of significant expansion.

Wallace's presidency was less than one year old when the global economy began to collapse into the Great Depression in the fall of 1929. Almost immediately, funding for University programs was in short supply and Wallace was forced to take action. He was to decide between shutting down existing University departments or cutting staff salaries across the board. Needless to say, Wallace chose the latter action, and no departments at the university were closed despite the desperate economic situation. The financial difficulties did, however, slow the expansion of the university. No new buildings were constructed on the Edmonton Campus until after the Second World War.

Despite the massive monetary restrictions placed on him by the Great Depression, Wallace managed not only to maintain the integrity and viability of the institution, but to improve it as well. During his period in office, the School of Nursing became an autonomous department with the ability to grant degrees. (Previous to this development, nursing students studying at Alberta had to travel to Ontario or British Columbia to complete their degrees.) Wallace also helped to establish the Banff School of Fine Arts (now called the Banff Centre) in 1933.

Wallace's contributions were not limited to the educational sphere. During his time in Alberta, Wallace continued with his passion for field geology and resource prospecting. He helped unearth the vast and profitable pitchblende deposits in the far north region of the province. Wallace was also among the first geologists to suggest that there may be economic potential in the development of the tar sands on the outskirts of Fort McMurray.

=== The Queen's Principalship (1936–1951) ===
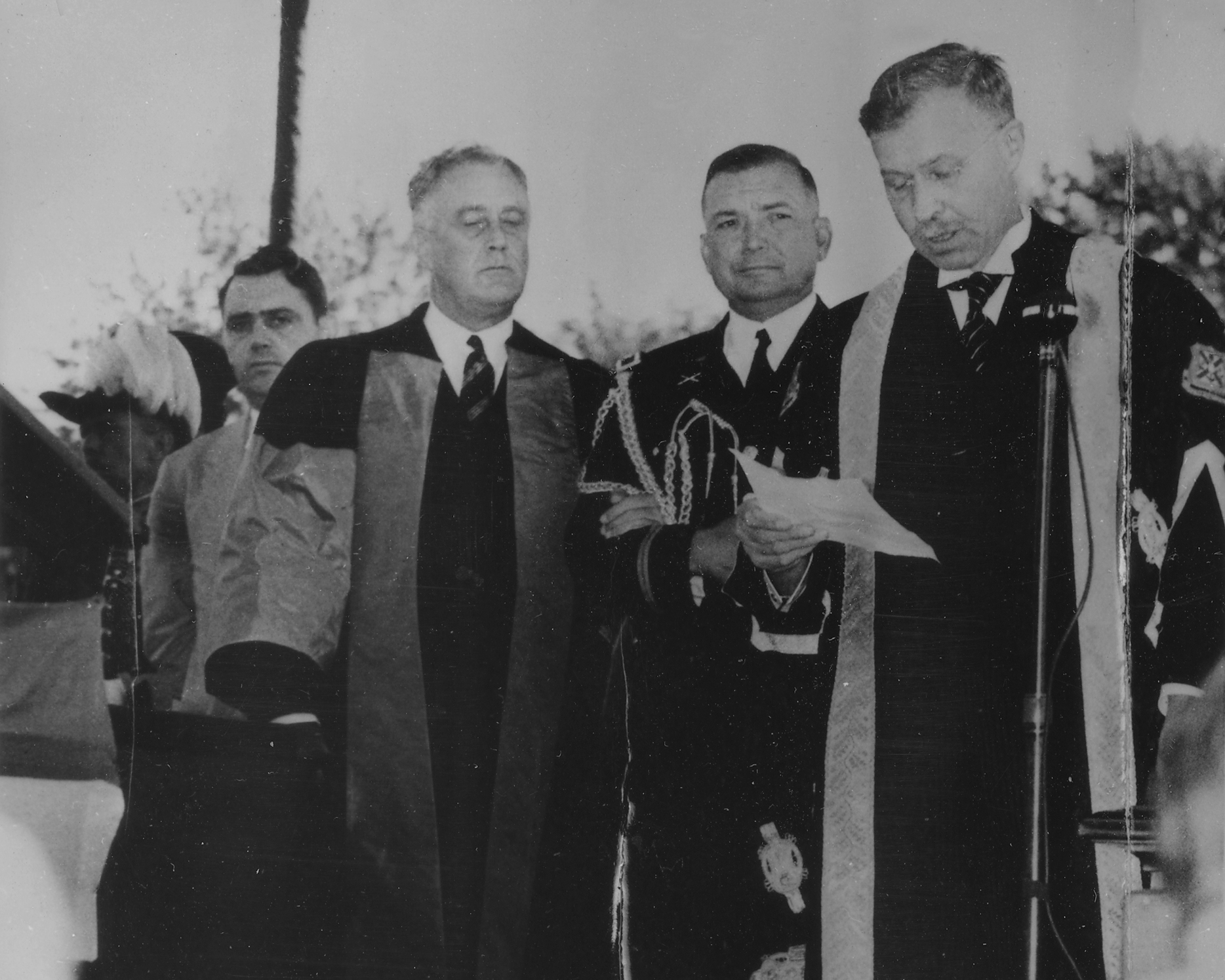
Wallace speaking (right) during the honorary degree ceremony for United States President Franklin D. Roosevelt in 1938.

After nearly eight years as the president of the University of Alberta, Robert Wallace was offered the Principalship at Queen's University in Kingston, Ontario by chancellor James Richardson. Wallace accepted the offer, and was installed as the university's eleventh Principal on September 1, 1936. He was the first scientist to ever hold the position. (Nine of the previous 10 Principals were ministers, the other was a Classics professor.) He would hold the position until his formal retirement in 1951.

Prior to Wallace's arrival, growth at Queen's University had stagnated significantly (as it had with most other institutions during the depression years). Under Wallace, however, Queen's would undergo an extended period of massive expansion. During his reign, Wallace added a large number of new departments and institutes including a School of Nursing and a School of Fine Arts (just like Alberta), a School of Physical Education and Health, a Board of Graduate Studies, and a Biological Research Station (at Lake Opinicon). Three new buildings were erected during his tenure, and the Students' Union building was torn down and rebuilt—it had been seriously damaged in a fire in 1947. Wallace also worked hard to improve the quality and quantity of academic staff. Faculty and staff salaries were increased four times during his time as Principal. Wallace also defended so-called "left wing" professors during the intense anti-communist atmosphere of the cold war, refusing to fire those staff members despite heated calls for their dismissal.

It was during his tenure at Queen's that Wallace became highly regarded nationally (and internationally) as an extremely effective and efficient academic administrator. He was one of just three Canadians chosen to represent the country at the United Nations Conference for the establishment of an educational and cultural organization (ECO/CONF) held in London in November 1945. It was at this conference that the United Nations Educational, Scientific, and Educational Organization (UNESCO) was created. Additionally, Wallace received honorary degrees from twenty different universities.

In 1951, Wallace formally resigned his position as the Principal of Queen's. His time at the institution was marked by tremendous growth, in terms of both facilities and enrollment. Under his leadership, Queen's University had become a premier post-secondary institution, and it is no surprise that his time at Queen's is looked upon fondly by staff, students, and alumni. To many close friends, he was known as "Wallace of Queen's". Wallace Hall, a large medieval style meeting hall (that is now part of the John Deutsch University Centre Complex), was named in his honor. The portrait collection of Queen's Principals and Chancellors can also be found in Wallace Hall.

=== The Human Stock: Wallace and Eugenics ===
Controversially, Robert Wallace was a prominent and outspoken advocate of eugenics and selective breeding programs, particularly during his time in Alberta. In an address to the Canadian Medical Association entitled "The Quality of the Human Stock" in Calgary in June 1934, Wallace asserted the following:

"Science has done very much to raise the quality of the stock in the domesticated animals which man has reared for his service; it has done virtually nothing to raise the quality of the human stock."

"The time has come to make eugenics not only a scientific philosophy but in very truth a religion."

"These are steps to a still far distant goal—that of a fitter, healthier, intellectually more capable people to do the world's work, which through its increasing difficulty calls for better quality of brain and brawn that has yet been given to the task."

Wallace, along with fellow University of Alberta faculty member John MacEachran, was a frank supporter of Alberta's eugenic legislation, including the 1928 Sexual Sterilization Act, which permitted the forcible sterilization of "undesirables" in the province. Alberta was one of only two provinces (the other was British Columbia) to pass such legislation. The Act was not repealed until 1972.

=== The Arctic Institute of North America (1951–1955) ===
Following his retirement from Queen's in 1951, Wallace joined the newly formed Arctic Institute of North America (AINA), which at that time was housed at McGill University in Montreal. (In 1976, the institute transferred to the University of Calgary, becoming a full, multi-disciplinary Arctic research institute in 1979.) Wallace signed on as the institute's executive director. Having spent many years exploring the vast Northern regions of Manitoba and Alberta, Wallace was ideally suited to the task. Though many were surprised that he would accept such a position in his twilight years, Wallace's passion for discovery and his love for the northern landscape meant the position was a perfect fit.

Wallace's tenure at the Institute ended with his sudden death on January 29, 1955. His death was mourned not only at the AINA, but at Queen's and Alberta as well. Wallace Hall, in the John Deutsch University Centre at Queen's, is named in his honour. Robert Wallace Drive, a street in Kingston, Ontario, is named in his honour.

Academic offices
Preceded by Henry Marshall Tory	President of the University of Alberta; 1928–1936	Succeeded by William A. R. Kerr
Preceded by William Hamilton Fyfe	Principal of Queen's University; 1936–1951	Succeeded by William Archibald Mackintosh
Professional and academic associations
Preceded by Henry Marshall Tory	President of the Royal Society of Canada; 1940–1941	Succeeded by Frederic William Howay
