= David H. Turpin =

Canadian scholar

David Howard Turpin CM, PhD, FRSC

13th President of the University of Alberta
- In office 1 July 2015 – 30 June 2020
- Chancellor: Douglas Stollery
- Preceded by: Indira Samarasekera
- Succeeded by: Bill Flanagan

6th President of University of Victoria
- In office 1 September 2000 – 30 June 2013
- Preceded by: David F. Strong
- Succeeded by: Jamie Cassels

Personal details
- Born: 14 July 1956 (age 70) Duncan, British Columbia, Canada
- Education: University of British Columbia
- Occupation: Administrator
- Profession: Academic, professor, plant biologist, author
- Salary: $689,597.48 (2019)
- Awards: Order of Canada
- Scientific career
- Fields: Botany; Oceanography
- Workplaces: University of British Columbia; University of Victoria; University of Alberta
- Thesis: Processes in nutrient based phytoplankton ecology (1980)

David Howard Turpin CM FRSC (born 14 July 1956) is a Canadian scholar and the former university president. Turpin was the president and vice-chancellor of the University of Alberta (2015–2020) and the University of Victoria (2000 to 2013).

In 2010, he was appointed a member of the Order of Canada.

== Early life and education ==
In 1977, Turpin received a BSc degree in cell biology from the University of British Columbia. In 1980 he received a PhD degree in botany and oceanography from the University of British Columbia.

== Career ==
From 2000 to 2013, Turpin was the president and vice-chancellor of the University of Victoria. Turpin was appointed the president and vice-chancellor of the University of Alberta in 2015. He did not seek renewal for a second term, and his term at the University of Alberta ended on 30 June 2020. Turpin is president emeritus of the University of Alberta. He was appointed as a member of the board of directors for Polar Knowledge Canada for 5 years from January 2023 to January 2028.

== Awards and distinctions ==
- Honorary Doctor of Laws, University of Manitoba (2015)
- Queen's Diamond Jubilee Medal (2012)
- Member, Order of Canada (2010)
- ISI Highly Cited Researcher (2004)
- Queen's Golden Jubilee Medal (2002)
- Fellow, Royal Society of Canada (1998)
- Who's Who in Canada (1997)
- Who's Who in Science and Engineering (1996)
- Who's Who in America (1995)
- Darbaker Prize in Phycology, American Botanical Association (1991)

Academic offices
Preceded by David F. Strong	6th President of the University of Victoria; 2000–2013	Succeeded by Jamie Cassels
Preceded by Indira Samarasekera	13th President of the University of Alberta; 2015–2020	Succeeded by Bill Flanagan
