= Max Wyman =

Canadian mathematician and academic administrator

President of the University of Alberta
- In office 1969–1974
- Preceded by: Walter H. Johns
- Succeeded by: Harry Gunning

Personal details
- Born: April 14, 1916 Lethbridge, Alberta, Canada
- Died: February 9, 1991 (aged 74) Edmonton, Alberta, Canada
- Education: University of Alberta; California Institute of Technology
- Occupation: mathematician, professor, academic administrator
- Awards: Jeffery-Williams Prize (1976)

Max Wyman (April 14, 1916 – February 9, 1991) was a Canadian mathematician and academic administrator. He served as president of the University of Alberta from 1969 to 1974. He was educated at the University of Alberta (BSc 1937) and California Institute of Technology (PhD magna cum laude). He rejoined his alma mater in 1943, the University of Alberta as a lecturer, and became a professor in 1956. In 1961, he was chair of the Department of Mathematics, and from 1963 to 1965 was the Dean of Science. He was named Vice President (Academic) of the university in 1964, and became president in 1969. He was the first former student of the University to become president. Wyman retired in 1974 and died in 1991.
