= List of University of Alberta honorary degree recipients =

This is a list of honorary degree recipients from the University of Alberta.

== A ==
- Susan Aglukark LL.D. (2005)
- Sir James Albert Manning Aikins LL.D. (1921)
- William Donald Albright LL.D. (1946)
- Anne Anderson LL.D. (1978)
- William Hardy Alexander LL.D. (1933)
- Frances Elizabeth Allen D.Sc. (1991)
- Doris Hilda Anderson LL.D. (1973)
- John Ansel Anderson LL.D. (1965)
- Margaret Weir Andrekson LL.D. (1987)
- Catherine Brodie Andrews LL.D. (1966)
- Ted Tetsuo Aoki LL.D. (1992)
- Albert Ernest Archer LL.D. (1948)
- Violet Archer D.Litt. (1993)
- Earl of Athlone LL.D. (1943)
- Laura Margaret Attrux LL.D. (1970)

== B ==
- Paul Babey LL.D. (1986)
- Benjamin Raymond Babin LL.D. (1980)
- Doris Badir LL.D. (1994)
- Tara Ali Baig LL.D. (1988)
- Thomas Davidson Baker LL.D. (1974)
- Ged Baldwin LL.D. (1982)
- H. Hugh Bancroft LL.D. (1980)
- Ronald Kitchener Banister LL.D. (1989)
- Thomas Benjamin Banks LL.D. (1987)
- Lloyd Ingram Barber LL.D. (1983)
- Vernon West Barford M.A. (1924)
- David Edward Barmes D.Sc. (1992)
- John Walker Barnett LL.D. (1947)
- Murray Llewellyn Barr LL.D. (1967)
- Dudley Edward Batchelor LL.D. (1964)
- Sir Edward Wentworth Beatty LL.D. (1938)
- Nicolas Dubois Dominic Beck LL.D. (1927)
- Monique Begin LL.D. (1989)
- Herbert Clifford Belcourt LL.D. (2001)
- John Irving Bell D.Sc. (2003)
- John Kim Bell LL.D. (1999)
- Richard Bedford Bennett LL.D. (1928)
- Charles Fred Bentley D.Sc. (1990)
- Sidney Martin Blair LL.D. (1975)
- Sidney Robert Blair D.Sc. (1989)
- Selwyn G. Blaylock LL.D. (1930)
- Louis-Philippe Bonneau LL.D. (1969)
- John Campbell Bowen LL.D. (1939)
- Marjorie Montgomery Bowker LL.D. (1991)
- Wilbur Fee Bowker LL.D. (1972)
- John James Bowlen LL.D. (1952)
- John C. F. Bown LL.D. (1930)
- John Edward Bradley LL.D. (1972)
- Per-Ingvar Branemark D.Sc. (1997)
- Robert Brett LL.D. (1915)
- Edmund Kemper Broadus LL.D. (1933)
- Leonard Walter Brockington LL.D. (1939)
- Harrison Scott Brown LL.D. (1961)
- Harry Knowlton Brown LL.D. (1961)
- John Edward Brownlee LL.D. (1928)
- John Bruce LL.D. (1969)
- Thomas Brzustowski D.Sc. (2000)
- Frank Gordon Buchanan LL.D. (1947)
- William Ashbury Buchanan LL.D. (1949)
- Georges M. Bugnet LL.D. (1978)
- George H. V. Bulyea LL.D. (1908)
- Cecil Scott Burgess LL.D. (1958)
- Lt. Gen. Eedson Louis Millard Burns LL.D. (1968)
- Patricia Eileen Burns LL.D. (1986)
- Barbara Anne Burrows LL.D. (1987)
- Alfred Leroy Burt LL.D. (1966)
- Alan Chadburn Burton LL.D. (1963)
- Gen. Julian Hedworth George Byng LL.D. (1922)

== C ==
- Andrew Cairns LL.D. (1950)
- Laurence Yeomans Cairns LL.D. (1955)
- Theodore LeSueur Cairns LL.D. (1970)
- Alexander Calhoun LL.D. (1953)
- George Reginald Calvert LL.D. (1963)
- June Callwood D.Litt. (1988)
- Margaret Cammaert LL.D. (1996)
- George Donald West Cameron LL.D. (1962)
- Neil Campbell LL.D. (1970)
- Peter McGregor Campbell LL.D. (1954)
- Charles Camsell LL.D. (1929)
- Sir Anthony Caro D.Litt. (1990)
- Douglas Cardinal LL.D. (2002)
- Harold James Cardinal LL.D. (1999)
- Margaret Ruth Pringle Carse LL.D. (1991)
- James Carter D.Sc. (2004)
- Victor Christian William Cavendish LL.D. (1917)
- Charles Chan D.Sc. (1997)
- Lionel Clare Charlesworth LL.D. (1950)
- Joseph Vincent Charyk LL.D. (1964)
- Rae MacIntyre Chittick LL.D. (1954)
- Jean Chrétien LL.D. (1987)
- Hélène Cixous LL.D. (1992)
- Donald Robert Clandinin D.Sc. (1985)
- Charles Joseph Clark LL.D. (1985)
- George Elliot Clarke D.Litt. (2005)
- John William Clay LL.D. (1950)
- Gilles George Cloutier D.Sc. (1983)
- Henry John Cody LL.D. (1935)
- Frank H. Collicutt LL.D. (1955)
- John Bertram Collip LL.D. (1946)
- William (Bill) Comrie LL.D. (2004)
- Edward Annand Corbett LL.D. (1963)
- Eliot Corday D.Sc. (1991)
- Barbara Cormack LL.D. (1983)
- Col. Eric Wyld Cormack LL.D. (1983)
- Nellie Cournoyea LL.D. (2004)
- Herbert Thomas Coutts LL.D. (1979)
- Harold Scott MacDonald Coxeter LL.D. (1957)
- Neil Stanley Crawford LL.D. (1987)
- Brig. Gen. Ernest Alexander Cruikshank LL.D. (1916)
- Chester Raymond Cunningham LL.D. (1989)

== D ==
- John Wesley Dafoe LL.D. (1934)
- Ronald Norman Dalby LL.D. (1980)
- Paul Davenport LL.D. (1994)
- Robertson Davies LL.D. (1957)
- John N. Decore LL.D. (1980)
- Laurence George Decore LL.D. (1999)
- Louis Armand Desrochers LL.D. (1978)
- Olive Patricia Dickason D.Litt. (1995)
- Clennell Haggerston Dickins LL.D. (1967)
- Horatio Lovat Dickson LL.D. (1969)
- Jennifer Dickson LL.D. (1988)
- John Diefenbaker LL.D. (1974)
- Robert James Dinning LL.D. (1959)
- Robert Gordon Douglas LL.D. (1963)
- Thomas Clement Douglas LL.D. (1976)
- John David Dower LL.D. (1954)
- Clare James Drake LL.D. (1995)
- Rene Jules Dubos LL.D. (1963)
- Henry Alexander Dyde LL.D. (1965)
- Samuel Walters Dyde LL.D. (1915)

== E ==
- Dorothy Jean Easton LL.D. (1986)
- W. Everard Edmunds LL.D. (1955)
- Gladys McKelvie Egbert LL.D. (1965)
- William Egbert LL.D. (1927)
- Sheila Agnes Egoff LL.D. (1985)
- James Frank Elliott LL.D. (1994)
- William Harold Epstein LL.D. (1984)
- Richard Bryan Erb D.Sc. (1990)
- Georges Erasmus LL.D. (1997)
- Eric Ericson LL.D. (1996)

== F ==
- William Harmen Fairfield LL.D. (1930)
- Barker Fairley LL.D. (1958)
- Sir Robert Alexander Falconer LL.D. (1936)
- Ray Fletcher Farquharson LL.D. (1960)
- George Victor Ferguson LL.D. (1958)
- John Ferguson LL.D. (1998)
- Walter Frederick Ferrier D.Sc. (1915)
- Sem Wissler Field LL.D. (1960)
- Olive Margaret Fisher LL.D. (1950)
- William Thomas Ross Flemington LL.D. (1959)
- Robert Edward Folinsbee D.Sc. (1989)
- Eldon Foote LL.D. (1996)
- Charles Ross Ford LL.D. (1963)
- Clinton James Ford LL.D. (1953)
- Frank Ford LL.D. (1946)
- George Ford D.Sc. (1988)
- Jean Beatrice Forest LL.D. (1983)
- Helen Forrester D.Litt. (1993)
- Ray Fortune LL.D. (1993)
- James Fowler LL.D. (1949)
- William Sherwood Fox LL.D. (1937)
- Ursula Martius Franklin D.Sc. (1989)
- Roderick Fraser LL.D. (2005)
- Freeman Freeman-Thomas, 1st Marquess of Willingdon LL.D. (1927)
- Henry Friesen D.Sc. (2001)
- Herbert Fröhlich LL.D. (1968)
- Darol Kenneth Froman LL.D. (1964)
- Millard Dean Fuller LL.D. (1999)

== G ==
- Geoffrey Abbott Gaherty LL.D. (1953)
- Francis Philip Galbraith LL.D. (1959)
- Leymah Roberta Gbowee LL.D. (2012)
- Eric A. Geddes LL.D. (1980)
- Helen Beny Gibson LL.D. (1967)
- Henry George Glyde LL.D. (1982)
- Dasha Sosia Goody D.Litt. (1994)
- Elsie Park Gowan LL.D. (1982)
- Robert Kay Gordon LL.D. (1958)
- George Roger Pringle Graham LL.D. (1969)
- Charles Henry Grant LL.D. (1968)
- Henry Allen Gray LL.D. (1915)
- Leslie Claude Green LL.D. (1994)
- Randy Gregg D.Sc. (2024)
- Wayne Douglas Gretzky LL.D. (2000)
- Ernest Gruening LL.D. (1950)
- Harry Emmet Gunning D.Sc. (1983)

== H ==
- Cecil Edwin Hall LL.D. (1968)
- Matthew Henry Halton LL.D. (1956)
- William Scott Hamilton LL.D. (1977)
- William Fielding Hanna LL.D. (1954)
- Robert MacDonald Hardy LL.D. (1977)
- W. G. Hardy LL.D. (1973)
- Herbert Thomas Hargrave LL.D. (1990)
- C. Richard Harington D.Sc. (2004)
- Walter E. Harris D.Sc. (1991)
- Walter Stanley Hartroft LL.D. (1961)
- Horace Harvey LL.D. (1915)
- Donald Southam Harvie LL.D. (1985)
- Eric Lafferty Harvie LL.D. (1957)
- Bashir A Hashmi LL.D. (1958)
- Richard Haskayne LL.D. (1996)
- Sir Frederick William Gordon Haultain LL.D. (1925)
- Bohdan Hawrylyshyn LL.D. (1986)
- Allan Stuart Hay D.Sc. (1987)
- Robert Hall Haynes D.Sc. (1998)
- Ivan Leigh Head LL.D. (1987)
- Robert Wesley Hedley LL.D. (1953)
- Arnold Danford Patrick Heeney LL.D. (1967)
- Leone McGregor Hellstedt D.Sc. (1977)
- Rudolph Hennig LL.D. (1965)
- William Bertram Herbert LL.D. (1965)
- Naomi Louisa Hersom LL.D. (1992)
- Gerhard Herzberg LL.D. (1961)
- Margaret (Marmie) Perkins Hess LL.D. (2003)
- Arthur Garfin Hiller D.Litt. (2002)
- Ramon John Hnatyshyn LL.D. (1994)
- Lisbeth Hockey LL.D. (1980)
- Marjorie Hodgson LL.D. (1992)
- Lois E. Hole LL.D. (2000)
- Peggy Holmes D.Litt. (1991)
- Oleksandr Honchar D.Litt. (1992)
- Hugh M. Horner LL.D. (1984)
- Myer Horowitz LL.D. (1990)
- Frank Lappin Horsfall LL.D. (1963)
- Maxwell Howell LL.D. (1998)
- William Robinson Howson LL.D. (1947)
- Xinbai Huang LL.D. (1988)
- Erast Huculak LL.D. (2001)
- Linda Hughes LL.D. (2003)
- John Hume LL.D. (2002)
- Wilma Helen Hunley LL.D. (1985)
- William Hurlburt LL.D. (1997)
- Melvin Gordon Hurtig LL.D. (1986)
- Roger Alexandre Hurtubise LL.D. (1994)
- Helen Isabel Huston LL.D. (1985)
- Mervyn James Huston D.Sc. (1988)
- Louis Davies Hyndman LL.D. (2000)

== I ==
- Alexander M Iakovlev LL.D. (1991)
- Alexis Ignatieff LL.D. (1972)
- Randall Eugene Ivany LL.D. (1981)

== J ==
- Margaret Isabel Jackson LL.D. (1964)
- Mary Percy Jackson LL.D. (1976)
- Barbara Ward Jackson LL.D. (1967)
- Robert William Brierley Jackson LL.D. (1968)
- Peter Jacyk LL.D. (1995)
- Frank Cyril James LL.D. (1958)
- Paul Janssen D.Sc. (1996)
- Stephen Arnold Jarislowsky LL.D. (1987)
- Frederick Thomas Jenner LL.D. (1976)
- William Gladstone Jewitt LL.D. (1953)
- Walter Hugh Johns LL.D. (1970)
- K. Glen Johnson LL.D. (1992)
- Edgar T. Jones LL.D. (1993)
- Anthony Jordan LL.D. (1971)
- Ronald Earl Jordan D.Sc. (1992)

== K ==
- Walter Kaasa D.Litt. (1993)
- Jacob Gordin Kaplan D.Sc. (1988)
- Tawakkol Karman LL.D. (2012)
- Ernest Sydney Keeping LL.D. (1972)
- George William Kerby LL.D. (1937)
- William Alexander Robb Kerr LL.D. (1933)
- Larkin Kerwin LL.D. (1983)
- Nathan Keyfitz LL.D. (1984)
- Egerton Warren King D.Sc. (1988)
- Yukio Kobayashi LL.D. (1993)
- Arthur Kroeger LL.D. (2004)
- Robert Kroetsch D.Litt. (1997)
- Doris Kule LL.D. (2005)
- Peter Kule LL.D. (2005)
- Hiroshi Kurimoto LL.D. (1993)
- Shizu Kurimoto LL.D. (1987)
- Yuichi Kurimoto LL.D. (1964)

== L ==
- Arthur Lacerte LL.D. (1979)
- Gerard Vincent La Forest LL.D. (1988)
- William Albert Lang LL.D. (1966)
- Bora Laskin LL.D. (1972)
- John Lee Laurie LL.D. (1956)
- Milton Ezra Lazerte LL.D. (1963)
- Lila Doris Lee LL.D. (1986)
- Émile-Joseph Legal LL.D. (1915)
- Cardinal Paul-Émile Léger LL.D. (1967)
- Adolph Ludwig Ferdinand Lehmann LL.D. (1930)
- Raymond Urgel Lemieux D.Sc. (1991)
- Jenny Le Rouge Le Saunier LL.D. (1966)
- Jean-Louis Levern LL.D. (1955)
- Walther Lichem LL.D. (2001)
- Samuel Sereth Lieberman LL.D. (1990)
- Mary Lobay LL.D. (1992)
- Oliver Stanley Longman LL.D. (1954)
- Reginald D. Loomis LL.D. (1991)
- Edgar Peter Lougheed LL.D. (1986)
- Levko Lukianenko LL.D. (1993)
- Irenee Lussier LL.D. (1957)
- Guy Redvers Lyle LL.D. (1964)
- Francis Charles Lynch-Staunton LL.D. (1980)

== M ==
- Robert Alexander Leslie Macbeth D.Sc. (1988)
- Donald Neil MacCharles LL.D. (1959)
- Hugh John Macdonald LL.D. (1961)
- John Hugh MacDonald LL.D. (1960)
- Murray William MacDonald LL.D. (1978)
- John Malcolm MacEachran LL.D. (1933)
- John Walter Grant MacEwan LL.D. (1966)
- Joseph Arthur MacFarlane LL.D. (1965)
- James Grierson MacGregor, Sr LL.D. (1971)
- James Grierson MacGregor, Jr D.Sc. (1999)
- Charles Malcolm MacInnes LL.D. (1958)
- Frank Campbell MacIntosh LL.D. (1964)
- Norman Archibald MacRae MacKenzie LL.D. (1950)
- Ross Anderson MacKimmie LL.D. (1963)
- James Angus MacKinnon LL.D. (1948)
- Vladimir Nicolaus Mackiw D.Sc. (1976)
- Hector Robertson MacLean LL.D. (1977)
- James Alexander MacLean LL.D. (1916)
- Lloyd Douglas MacLean D.Sc. (1989)
- Alistair MacLeod D.Litt. (2002)
- Charles Malcolm Macleod LL.D. (1959)
- John Edward Annand Macleod LL.D. (1958)
- Joseph Neil MacNeil LL.D. (1982)
- Harold Alexander MacNeil LL.D. (1977)
- Earle Douglas MacPhee LL.D. (1957)
- Cécile E. Mactaggart LL.D. (2006)
- Sandy Auld Mactaggart LL.D. (1990)
- Charles Alexander Magrath LL.D. (1940)
- Gerald James Maier LL.D. (1999)
- Madame Antonine Maillet LL.D. (1979)
- Joseph McMillan Malone LL.D. (1986)
- Ernest Charles Manning LL.D. (1948)
- Frederick Charles Mannix LL.D. (1970)
- Christian Peter Marker LL.D. (1924)
- Allan Markin LL.D. (2002)
- Ethel Anne Marliss D.Litt. (1989)
- Joseph B. Martin D.Sc. (1998)
- Ronald Martland LL.D. (1964)
- Arnold Whitney Matthews LL.D. (1967)
- Donald F. Mazankowski LL.D. (1993)
- Helen Griffith Wylie McArthur LL.D. (1964)
- Arthur Gilbert McCalla D.Sc. (1981)
- William Copeland McCalla LL.D. (1956)
- Doris McCarthy LL.D. (2002)
- George B. McClellan LL.D. (1978)
- Ruth Elizabeth McClure LL.D. (1984)
- Hazel Rutherford McCuaig LL.D. (1964)
- Mattie Louise McCullough LL.D. (1983)
- Sherburne McCurdy LL.D. (1986)
- David Cargill McDonald LL.D. (1985)
- Alfred Clayton McGhan LL.D. (1981)
- Pauline Mills McGibbon LL.D. (1967)
- Ian Nicholson McKinnon LL.D. (1961)
- Madame Justice Beverley M. McLachlin LL.D. (1991)
- Barbara McLaren LL.D. (1968)
- Colin Campbell McLaurin LL.D. (1961)
- David George Alexander McLean LL.D. (1994)
- Lionel Everett McLeod D.Sc. (1988)
- Herbert Marshall McLuhan LL.D. (1971)
- George Frederick McNally LL.D. (1946)
- Gary William Wilcox McPherson LL.D. (1995)
- David George McQueen LL.D. (1915)
- Ian McTaggart-Cowan LL.D. (1971)
- Peter Brian Medawar LL.D. (1963)
- Frank Hamilton Mewburn LL.D. (1922)
- Daniel Roland Michener LL.D. (1967)
- Carl Stinson Miller LL.D. (1971)
- Frank Robert Miller LL.D. (1965)
- Associate Chief Justice Tevie H. Miller LL.D. (1991)
- Horatio Ray Milner LL.D. (1952)
- Stanley Albert Milner LL.D. (1994)
- James V. Hogarth Milvain LL.D. (1979)
- Betty Mitchell LL.D. (1958)
- Charles Richmond Mitchell LL.D. (1939)
- Sir Harold Mitchell LL.D. (1970)
- W. O. Mitchell D.Litt. (1975)
- Leo Mol LL.D. (1985)
- Mary Bowlen Mooney LL.D. (1969)
- William Kenneth Moore LL.D. (1988)
- Ibrahim Follansbee Morrison LL.D. (1953)
- William George Morrow LL.D. (1974)
- Elizabeth Homer Morton LL.D. (1969)
- Sir James Frederick Mountford LL.D. (1958)
- James Muir LL.D. (1915)
- Monsignor Athol Murray LL.D. (1975)
- Walter Charles Murray LL.D. (1915)
- James Fraser Mustard D.Sc. (1999)
- Gordon Edward Myers D.Sc. (1990)

== N ==
- Tattanahall Lakshminarayani Nagabhushan D.Sc. (1995)
- Raymond Nelson LL.D. (1998)
- Eric P. Newell LL.D. (2002)
- Robert Newton LL.D. (1950)
- Patrick Joseph Nicholson LL.D. (1950)
- Arne Rudolph Nielsen D.Sc. (2000)
- Charles Sherwood Noble LL.D. (1952)
- Antoine A. Noujaim D.Sc. (2001)

== O ==
- Lewis James O'Brien LL.D. (1955)
- George Bligh O'Connor LL.D. (1952)
- Albert Frederick Hans Oeming LL.D. (1972)
- Henry Joseph O'Leary LL.D. (1922)
- Frank Oliver LL.D. (1931)
- H.A. "Bud" Olson LL.D. (1996)
- Frederick Ernest Osborne LL.D. (1947)
- Frank O'Sullivan LL.D. (1977)
- Tatsuo Ozawa LL.D. (1997)

== P ==
- John Percy Page LL.D. (1961)
- Alfred Ernest Pallister LL.D. (1987)
- Mary Irene Parlby LL.D. (1935)
- Harold Hayward Parlee LL.D. (1948)
- Margaret Agnes Parsons LL.D. (1970)
- Richard MacGregor Parsons LL.D. (1971)
- Gilbert Currie Paterson LL.D. (1960)
- Mabel Patrick LL.D. (1965)
- Frederic William Patterson LL.D. (1922)
- Gordon Neil Patterson LL.D. (1958)
- Andrew Pattullo LL.D. (1982)
- Ben Iden Payne LL.D. (1962)
- Gordon Peacock LL.D. (1990)
- Hugh John Sanders Pearson LL.D. (1992)
- Bruce B. Peel LL.D. (1991)
- Walter Joseph Phillips LL.D. (1960)
- William Eric Phillips LL.D. (1958)
- Eliot A Phillipson OC, MD, FCAHS (2009)
- Madame Justice Ellen Irene Picard LL.D. (1992)
- Wilfrid Pilkington LL.D. (1979)
- Arnold William Platt LL.D. (1965)
- Mary Sharon Pollock LL.D. (2005)
- George Pólya LL.D. (1961)
- Vere Brabazon Ponsonby LL.D. (1932)
- John Edward Poole LL.D. (1987)
- Francis Ethelbert Priestley D.Litt. (1973)
- James Taggart Priestley LL.D. (1956)
- Kenneth Harold Prior LL.D. (1954)
- Pearl L. Prior LL.D. (1954)
- Omeljan Pritsak D.Litt. (1985)
- Katharine Allison Proctor LL.D. (1946)
- Kenneth Aubrey Pugh LL.D. (1967)

== R ==
- Stephen Russel Ramsankar LL.D. (1989)
- Allan Coats Rankin LL.D. (1946)
- Bruce Irving Rankin LL.D. (1983)
- John Erskine Read LL.D. (1968)
- Jan Reimer LL.D. (2024)
- Lloyd George Reynolds LL.D. (1958)
- George Richard Agar Rice LL.D. (1966)
- John Henry Riddell LL.D. (1915)
- Bernard Ewald Riedel D.Sc. (1990)
- Marguerite Elizabeth Ritchie LL.D. (1975)
- Isobel Margaret Robinson LL.D. (1981)
- Adi Roche LL.D. (2001)
- Douglas Roche LL.D. (1986)
- Frank Gilbert Roe LL.D. (1951)
- Chester Alvin Ronning LL.D. (1965)
- Elmer Ernest Roper LL.D. (1959)
- John Thomas Ross LL.D. (1930)
- Monsignor Henri Routhier LL.D. (1986)
- Andrew Russell LL.D. (1997)
- Loris Shano Russell LL.D. (1958)
- Alexander Cameron Rutherford LL.D. (1908)
- Claude Ryan LL.D. (1998)

== S ==
- Edward Togo Salmon LL.D. (1980)
- Sima Samar LL.D. (2004)
- Jose Saramago D.Litt. (2005)
- Penrose Melvin Sauder LL.D. (1963)
- Hugh Hamilton Saunderson LL.D. (1959)
- Peter Savaryn LL.D. (1987)
- Thelma Ruth Scambler LL.D. (1986)
- Earle Parkhill Scarlett LL.D. (1958)
- John Lewis Schlosser LL.D. (1988)
- Horst A. Schmid LL.D. (1987)
- William George Schneider LL.D. (1968)
- David Lynch Scott LL.D. (1924)
- John William Scott LL.D. (1969)
- Howard Loomis Seamans LL.D. (1962)
- Hans Selye LL.D. (1978)
- Ralph Faust Shaner LL.D. (1971)
- James R. Shaw, Sr LL.D. (1993)
- George Y. Shevelov D.Litt. (1983)
- Marion Agnes Shipley LL.D. (1984)
- Joseph Harvey Shoctor LL.D. (1981)
- Arthur L. Sifton LL.D. (1908)
- William Charles Simmons LL.D. (1935)
- Glenda Patricia Simms LL.D. (1995)
- William Robert Sinclair LL.D. (1984)
- Manmohan Singh LL.D. (1997)
- Donald Victor Smiley LL.D. (1990)
- Alexander Smith LL.D. (1978)
- Donald Alexander Smith LL.D. (1909)
- Isabel Munroe Smith LL.D. (1988)
- Michael Smith D.Sc. (1996)
- Sidney Bruce Smith LL.D. (1962)
- Sidney Earle Smith LL.D. (1958)
- Bernard Snell LL.D. (1985)
- Lady Mary Soames LL.D. (2004)
- Christopher Somerville D.Sc. (1997)
- Akinwande Oluwole Soyinka D.Litt. (2001)
- Edouard Sonet LL.D. (1960)
- Joseph Dewey Soper LL.D. (1960)
- Ronald Donald Southam LL.D. (1991)
- M. Saretta Sparling LL.D. (1984)
- Matthew Spence LL.D. (2006)
- Franklin Keller Spragins LL.D. (1978)
- Joseph Grant Spratt LL.D. (1953)
- James M Stanford LL.D. (2000)
- Donald Russell Stanley D.Sc. (1988)
- George Douglas Stanley LL.D. (1951)
- George Francis Gillman Stanley LL.D. (1971)
- Frederick Stapells LL.D. (1956)
- Robert Steadward LL.D. (2002)
- George Hobson Steer LL.D. (1955)
- Janice Stein LL.D. (2005)
- Ralph Garvin Steinhauer LL.D. (1976)
- Charles R. Stelck D.Sc. (2003)
- John Ewart Wallace Sterling LL.D. (1970)
- Charles Mortram Sternberg LL.D. (1960)
- George Roy Stevens LL.D. (1964)
- William Alexander Stevenson LL.D. (1992)
- Andrew Stewart LL.D. (1959)
- Freeman Kenneth Stewart LL.D. (1962)
- John Smith Stewart LL.D. (1957)
- William H. Stewart LL.D. (1984)
- Winnifred Mary Stewart LL.D. (1972)
- Robert Stollery LL.D. (1985)
- John George Strachan LL.D. (1973)
- Jozef Straus D.Sc. (2000)
- Michael A. Strembitsky LL.D. (1989)
- Donna Strickland D.Sc. (2024)
- Harry E. Strom LL.D. (1982)
- Maurice Frederick Strong LL.D. (1973)
- Charles Allan Stuart LL.D. (1915)
- Jake Superstein LL.D. (1995)
- William Herbert Swift LL.D. (1968)

== T ==
- Princess Hisako Takamado LL.D. (2004)
- Don Tapscott LL.D. (2001)
- Walter Surma Tarnopolsky LL.D. (1986)
- Ethel Isabella Taylor LL.D. (1982)
- Malcolm Gordon Taylor LL.D. (1965)
- Richard E. Taylor D.Sc. (1991)
- Paul Tellier LL.D. (1996)
- Mother Teresa LL.D. (1982)
- U Thant LL.D. (1968)
- James Sutherland Thomson LL.D. (1949)
- Walter Palmer Thompson LL.D. (1957)
- Donald Walter Thomson LL.D. (1970)
- Leonard Baden Thomson LL.D. (1949)
- William Thorsell LL.D. (1995)
- Lindsay Ambrose Thurber LL.D. (1951)
- Phillip Vallentine Tobias D.Sc. (1987)
- Benjamin Torchinsky D.Sc. (2003)
- Henry Marshall Tory LL.D. (1928)
- Thomas Gordon Towers LL.D. (1992)
- Charles Hard Townes LL.D. (1967)
- Pierre Elliott Trudeau LL.D. (1968)
- Aubrey Stephen Tuttle LL.D. (1936)
- George Milledge Tuttle LL.D. (1983)
- Archbishop Desmond Tutu LL.D. (2000)
- Marion Tuu'luq LL.D. (1990)

== V ==
- Jules Joseph Arthur Van Brabant LL.D. (1984)
- Maurice Lewis Van Vliet LL.D. (1979)
- Monsignor Ferdinand Vandry LL.D. (1949)
- John Ross Vant LL.D. (1980)
- David George Vice LL.D. (1990)
- Cardinal Jean-Marie Rodrigue Villeneuve LL.D. (1936)
- Henry Viscardi, Jr LL.D. (1981)

== W ==
- Carl Friedrich von Weizsäcker LL.D. (1981)
- William Philip Wagner LL.D. (1982)
- Arthur Earl Walker LL.D. (1952)
- Robert Charles Wallace LL.D. (1951)
- Thomas Joseph Walsh LL.D. (1989)
- William Legh Walsh LL.D. (1932)
- Lord Diplock of Wansford LL.D. (1972)
- Lady Barbara Ward LL.D. (1967)
- Maxwell William Ward LL.D. (1979)
- John Bryan Ward-Perkins LL.D. (1969)
- Robert Rodger Wark LL.D. (1986)
- Mamoru Watanabe D.Sc. (1997)
- Arthur Balmer Watt LL.D. (1949)
- John Barney Weaver LL.D. (1984)
- Wilfred Rusk Wees LL.D. (1961)
- Kenneth Clifford Welsh LL.D. (1999)
- Fritz Warmolt Went LL.D. (1971)
- Max Hirsch Wershof LL.D. (1958)
- Frank Fairchild Westbrook LL.D. (1915)
- Dorothy Anne Wheeler D.Litt. (1990)
- Alison Genevieve White D.Litt. (1990)
- Eugene Paul Wigner LL.D. (1957)
- Arthur McEwan Wilson LL.D. (1971)
- Bertha Wilson LL.D. (1985)
- Charles, Prince of Wales LL.D. (1983)
- Edward VIII, The Prince Edward, Duke of Windsor LL.D. (1919)
- Francis George Winspear LL.D. (1951)
- Harriet Snowball Winspear LL.D. (1999)
- Alfred Wirth LL.D. (2005)
- Gen. Romuald Wolikowski LL.D. (1981)
- Edgar Allardyce Wood LL.D. (1969)
- Henry Wise Wood LL.D. (1929)
- James Hossack Woods LL.D. (1940)
- Prof. Roger Woodward LL.D. (1998)
- Dilworth Wayne Woolley LL.D. (1958)
- Walter H. Worth LL.D. (1991)
- Howard Phin Wright LL.D. (1954)
- Max Wyman LL.D. (1982)
- Gordon Kenneth Wynn LL.D. (1978)

== Y ==
- Rosalyn Yalow D.Sc. (1983)
- Dennis Kestall Yorath LL.D. (1974)
- James William Young LL.D. (1960)

== Z ==
- Jiang Zehui LL.D. (2002)
- Margaret Zeidler LL.D. (1997)
- James Zimmerman LL.D. (1977)
