= List of chancellors of the University of Alberta =

The list of chancellors of the University of Alberta, Edmonton, Alberta, Canada:

1. Charles Allan Stuart (1908–1926)
2. Nicolas Dubois Dominic Beck (1926–1927)
3. Alexander Cameron Rutherford (1927–1942)
4. Frank C. Ford (1942–1946)
5. George Fred McNally (1946–1952)
6. Earle Parkhill Scarlett (1952–1958)
7. Laurence Yeomans Cairns (1958–1964)
8. Francis Philip Galbraith (1964–1970)
9. Louis Armand Desrochers (1970–1974)
10. Ronald Norman Dalby (1974–1978)
11. Jean Beatrice Forest (1978–1982)
12. Peter Savaryn (1982–1986)
13. Tevie Harold Miller (1986–1990)
14. Sandy Auld Mactaggart (1990–1994)
15. Louis Davies Hyndman (1994–1998)
16. Lois Elsa Hole (1998–2000)
17. John Thomas Ferguson (2000–2004)
18. Eric P. Newell (2004–2008)
19. Linda Hughes (2008–2012)
20. Ralph B. Young (2012–2016)
21. Douglas Stollery (2016–2020)
22. Peggy Garritty (2020–2024)
23. Nizar Somji (2024-present)
