= List of members of the Alberta Order of Excellence =

The following is a full list of members of the Alberta Order of Excellence (AOE), both past and current, in order of their date of appointment.

== 2025 ==
In 2025, 9 appointments were made.

- Sine Chadi
- Geoff Cumming
- John Day
- Brian Felesky
- Stephanie Felesky
- Nichole Neubauer
- Lyn Radford
- John Scott
- Doug Stollery

== 2024 ==
In 2024, 8 appointments were made.

- Don Begg
- Will Ferguson
- Robert Foster
- Catherine Fraser
- Stephen Mandel
- Kim Ruether
- Nancy Southern
- Garnette Sutherland

== 2023 ==
In 2023, 8 appointments were made.

- James Carter
- Max Foran
- Stephen Harper
- Joe Lukacs
- Audrey McFarlane
- Claudette Tardif
- Stella Thompson
- James Angus Watt

== 2022 ==
In 2022, 7 appointments were made.

- Maureen Bianchini Purvis
- Robert Brawn
- M. Elizabeth Cannon
- Eleanor Chiu
- Cheryl Foggo
- Art Froehlich
- Cam Tait

== 2021 ==
In 2021, 8 appointments were made.

- Joan Donald, Red Deer
- Cyril Kay, Edmonton
- Murray McCann, Calgary
- Barb Olson, Calgary
- Merle Olson, Calgary
- D. Gregory Powell, Calgary
- Cor Van Raay, Lethbridge
- Lena Heavy Shields-Russell, Blood Reserve

== 2020 ==
Salma Lakhani was inducted to the AOE concurrent with her installation as lieutenant governor of Alberta.

7 other appointments were made in 2020.

- JudyLynn Archer, Edmonton
- Jim Boucher, Fort McKay
- Charlie Fischer, Calgary
- Frances Harley, Edmonton
- John Mah, Edmonton
- Holger Petersen, Edmonton
- Ed Stelmach, Andrew

== 2019 ==
In 2019, 8 appointment were made.

- Robert Burrell
- Bonnie DuPont
- Katie Ohe
- Ron Sakamoto
- Beckie Scott
- Malcolm Sissons
- Muriel Stanley Venne
- Frances Wright

== 2018 ==
In 2018 eight appointments were made.

- Reg Basken, Edmonton
- Rosella Bjornson, Sherwood Park
- Wayne Chiu, Calgary
- k.d. lang, Calgary
- David Manz, Calgary
- Solomon Rolingher, Edmonton
- Allan Wachowich, Edmonton
- Ralph Young, Edmonton

== 2017 ==
In 2017 eight appointments were made.

- Steve Allan, Calgary
- Gary Bowie, Lethbridge
- Anne Fanning, Edmonton
- Marie Gordon, Edmonton
- Steve Hrudey, Canmore
- James Holland, Edmonton
- Vivian Manasc, Edmonton
- David Werklund, Calgary

== 2016 ==
In 2016 eight appointments were made.

- Barry Bultz, Calgary
- Linda Hughes, Edmonton
- Sheldon Kennedy, Calgary
- Leroy Little Bear, Lethbridge
- Michael Massey, St. Albert
- Paulette Patterson, Grande Prairie
- Shirley Penner, Calgary
- Bill Yuill, Medicine Hat

== 2015 ==
- Lois Mitchell
- David Bissett
- Jack Donald
- Janice Eisenhauer
- Dennis Erker
- Fil Fraser
- Stan Grad
- Jacob Masliyah
- Frits Pannekoek

== 2014 ==
- Sharon Carry, Calgary
- Tony Cashman, Edmonton
- Morris Flewwelling, Red Deer
- Colin Glassco, Calgary
- Julia Hamilton, Calgary
- Willie Littlechild, Maskwacis
- Fred Mannix, Calgary
- Reinhard Muhlenfeld, Edmonton

== 2013 ==
- Douglas Eaglesham (community service/youth programs, military, politics)
- Roger Gibbins (public service/public policy, advanced education)
- Douglas O. Goss (business, community service)
- George W. Govier (energy, engineering)
- Jim Marshall (fine arts, culture/heritage)
- Anne McLellan (politics, law, advanced education)
- Catherine Roozen (business, health/community service)
- Bill Wilson (military, community service)

== 2012 ==
- Robert Hironaka
- Roger Jackson
- Irving Kipnes
- Griffin Lloyd
- Preston Manning
- Ronald Southern
- Robert Westbury
- Rosaleen Zdunich

== 2011 ==
- Patricia Blocksom
- Martin Cohos
- Bruce Hogle
- Walter Paszkowski
- Eric Rajah
- Aritha van Herk

== 2010 ==
- Phil Currie – palaeontologist
- Alex Janvier
- Ralph Klein – Former premier
- Janice McTighe
- Louise Miller
- William Mooney
- Reza Nasseri (home builder)
- Robert Steadward

== 2009 ==
- Shirzad Ahmed, Calgary
- Henry Bergen, Coaldale
- William (Bill) Bowes, Grande Prairie
- Helen Hengel, Calgary
- Bernadette McDonald, Banff
- Kenneth Sauer, Medicine Hat
- Barrie Strafford, Calgary
- Hal Wyatt, Calgary

== 2008 ==
- Clare Drake
- Dr. Helen Hays
- Allan P. Markin
- Dr. David W. Schindler
- Daryl K. (Doc) Seaman
- JR Shaw
- Thomas J. Walsh

== 2007 ==
- Chief Victor Stanley Buffalo
- Evelyn L. Buckley
- Lt. General Donald C. Laubman
- David W. Leonard
- Gary William (Wilcox) McPherson
- Douglas H. Mitchell
- Patrick R. Nixon

== 2006 ==
- William (Bill) Cochrane
- Bertha (Berdie) Fowler
- Richard (Dick) Haskayne
- Harry Hole
- James (Jim) Horsman
- Samuel (Sam) Lieberman
- Raymond (Ray) Rajotte
- Matthew Spence
- Ian Tyson

== 2005 ==
- Robert W. Chapman Sr.
- Dr. Gerald Hankins
- Dr. Margaret (Marmie) Hess
- Elsie Kawulych
- Norman Kwong (as Lieutenant Governor of Alberta)
- Father Charles Michael McCaffrey
- Ronald Mannix

== 2004 ==
- Alvin Gerald Libin
- M. Ann McCaig
- Eric Patrick Newell
- Bryan Perkins
- John & Barbara Poole

== 2003 ==
- Donald F. Mazankowski
- Audrey Attril Morrice
- Jim Simpson Palmer
- Leonard Peter Ratzlaff

== 2002 ==
- Dr. Steven Aung
- James. K. Gray
- John Murrell

== 2001 ==
- Louis Armand Desrochers
- Colonel (ret.) Donald Stewart Ethell

== 2000 ==
- Jenny Belzberg
- Dr. Chester R. Cunningham
- Lois Hole (as Lieutenant Governor of Alberta)
- Dr. D. Lorne J. Tyrrell

== 1999 ==
- Donald R. Getty
- Stanley G. Reynolds
- Dr. Shirley Marie Stinson

== 1998 ==
- Harley N. Hotchkiss
- June L. Lore
- Sandy A. Mactaggart
- Dr. Donald R. Stanley

== 1997 ==
- Ian Malcolm Macdonald
- Arthur Ryan Smith

== 1996 ==
- Bud Olson (as Lieutenant Governor of Alberta)
- Dr. A. Ernest Pallister
- Dr. John Snow

== 1995 ==
- Dr. Stanley A. Milner
- Dr. Francis G. Winspear

== 1994 ==
- Dr. Helen I. Huston

== 1993 ==
- Dr. Thomas B. Banks
- Dr. Robert B. Church

== 1992 ==
- Dr. Howard V. Gimbel

== 1991 ==
- Dr. Norbert R. Morgenstern
- Gordon Towers (as Lieutenant Governor of Alberta)

== 1990 ==
- Dr. Joseph H. Shoctor
- Dr. Raymond Lemieux

== 1989 ==
- Hon. Peter Lougheed
- Dr. Maxwell W. Ward

== 1988 ==
- Dr. Arthur T. Jenkyns
- Margaret Southern

== 1987 ==
- Dr. C. Fred Bentley
- Dr. James H. Gray

== 1986 ==
- Dr. John C. Callaghan
- Leonard K. Haney
- Herbert T. Hargrave
- Dr. Esther Robins

== 1985 ==
- Helen Hunley (as Lieutenant Governor of Alberta)
- Dr. David S. R. Leighton
- Dr. G. Richard A. Rice
- Dr. Winnifred M. Stewart

== 1984 ==
- Dr. Alexander Johnston
- Hon. Ronald Martland

== 1983 ==
- The Right Honourable C. Joseph Clark
- Dr. Mary Percy Jackson* (died 2000).
- Chester Ronning* (died 1984).

== 1982 ==
- J. W. Grant MacEwan
- Walter H. Johns

== 1981 ==
- Frank C. Lynch-Staunton (as Lieutenant Governor of Alberta)
- Hon. Ernest C. Manning
