= George McNally =

George McNally may refer to:

- George Fred McNally (1878–1965), Canadian educator
- George E. McNally (1923–1988), mayor of Mobile, Alabama
