= Francis Galbraith =

Francis Galbraith may refer to:

- Francis J. Galbraith (1913–1986), United States diplomat
- Francis Philip Galbraith (1896–1970), Canadian newspaper editor and chancellor of the University of Alberta
