= Blocksom =

Blocksom is a surname. Notable people with the surname include:

- Augustus P. Blocksom (1854–1931), United States Army general
- Fisher A. Blocksom (1782–1876), American politician and lawyer from Ohio
- Patricia Blocksom, Canadian lawyer and arbitrator
