= Hellstedt =

Hellstedt is a Swedish surname. Notable people with the surname include:

- Folke Hellstedt (1891–1969), Swedish high jumper
- Leone Hellstedt (1900–1977), Canadian-Swedish pathologist and psychoanalyst
