= McNally High School =

10-12 school in Edmonton, Alberta (est. 1964)

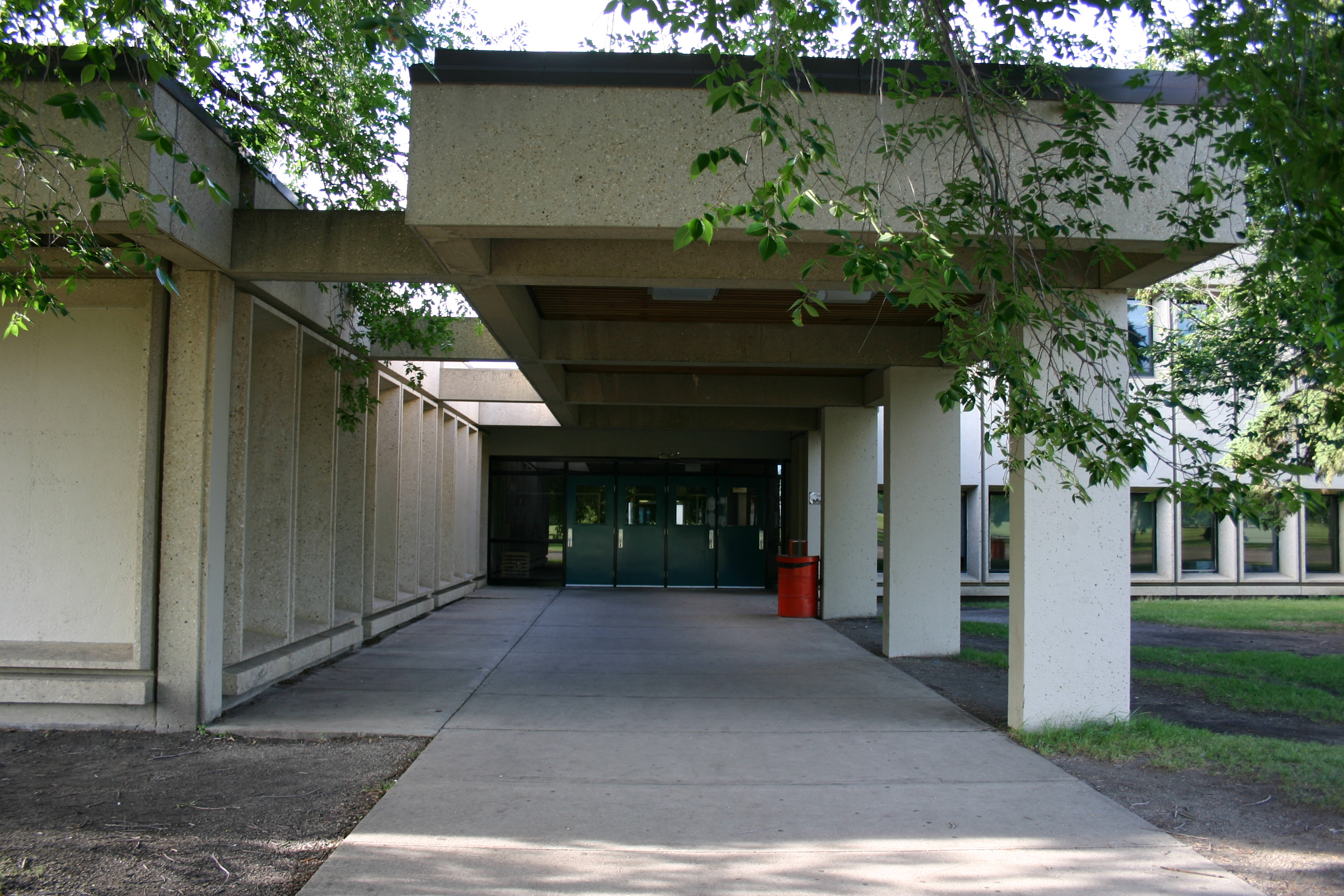
- School Entrance in 2006

Location
- 8440 - 105 Avenue; Edmonton, Alberta, T6A 1B6; Canada; 53°32′54.20″N 113°27′32.04″W

Information
- School type: Public Secondary School
- Motto: 'Nihil Sed Optimum' ('Nothing But The Best')
- Opened: 1964
- School board: Edmonton Public Schools
- Superintendent: Ron Thompson
- Area trustee: Ward D - Nickela Anderson
- Principal: Satinder Basra-Bhatti
- Grades: 10–12
- Enrollment: 1102 (2023)
- Language: English
- Colours: Orange and Black
- Mascot: The Tiger (Roary)
- Team name: Tigers
- Budget: $7,300,092 (2015 - 2016)
- Website: mcnally.epsb.ca

McNally High School is a secondary school located in the Forest Heights neighborhood in Edmonton, Alberta, Canada. It is operated by the Edmonton Public Schools system. The school is named after former Alberta Deputy Minister of Education and University of Alberta chancellor George Fred McNally.

== Programs of study ==
=== International Baccalaureate ===
McNally offers the International Baccalaureate Diploma Program in addition to the Alberta education curriculum.

=== Career and Technology Studies ===
The school offers a variety of programs aimed to help students develop skills for employment after graduation. These include photography, computer programming and animation, web design, communication technology, construction, design studies, and culinary arts.

== Building ==
While the building itself is not new, it has undergone many upgrades and repairs in the 2021-22 school year, including new lockers throughout the school, new bathrooms, all the classrooms were painted, the large gymnasium, and change rooms, and some classrooms. The school has separate labs for all the sciences, including a physics lab, a biology lab, a chemistry lab and three computer labs. McNally is dedicated to athletics, and as a result, there are two gyms, a fitness center and a new dance facility. There is also a large drama room and multiple music / choral rooms.

== Athletics ==
The following teams are available at McNally High School.

- Badminton
- Cheerleading
- Cross Country Running
- Rugby
- Curling
- Golf
- Basketball
- Football
- Soccer
- Swimming
- Track & Field
- Volleyball
- Wrestling
- Indoor soccer

== Notable alumni ==
- Shawn Belle – hockey player, Colorado Avalanche
- Jay Bouwmeester – hockey player, St. Louis Blues
- Mark Fistric – hockey player, Edmonton Oilers
- Cheryl Gibson – Olympic silver medalist
- Luther Hakunavanhu - Football player, Calgary Stampeders
- Jens Lindemann – trumpet player
- Jan Reimer – former mayor of Edmonton
- Tomáš Vincour- hockey player, Dallas Stars
- David Bissett- Olympic Bronze medalist (2010 4-man Bobsleigh)

== Extra-curricular activities ==
Programs run by students, for students, are important and widespread and give students the opportunity to organize events such as bike-a-thon, pancake breakfast, and H-Fest.

== Clubs ==
Many clubs are available at McNally, with plenty of opportunities to start new clubs or associations.

- Best Buddies
- Big Brothers Big Sisters mentoring program
- Cappies (Critics and Awards Program)
- Citadel Theatre student's club
- Eco-Nally club
- Gaming club
- Global Opportunities (GO) club
- Gay-Straight Alliance (G.S.A.)
- Grad council
- Hip Hop Collective
- Math Homework Club
- McNally Assists Students Serving in Volunteer Experiences (M.A.S.S.I.V.E.)
- McNally International club
- Model United Nations
- Multi-media club
- Reach for the Top
- Rotary club
- Running club
- Science Olympics
- Ski club
- Speak Up, Write Down (Speech, Debate, and Writing)
- Triple C (Chinese Culture Club)
- Yearbook committee
- McNally News Network (Weekly morning news broadcasts)

== Events ==
- Bike-a-thon
- Walk for Water
- Winter/Spring Market
- Pancake Breakfast

== 2022 stabbing ==
In the afternoon of April 8, 2022, a 16-year-old boy was stabbed outside the school and was rushed to hospital in a life-threatening condition. He succumbed to his injuries and died one week later on April 15, 2022. He was subsequently identified as Karanveer Sahota.
