= RBY =

RBY may refer to:

== Aeronautics ==
- Ruby Airport (IATA code RBY), a public-use airport in Ruby, Alaska
- Vision Airlines (ICAO code RBY), a defunct American airline

== Military ==
- Royal Buckinghamshire Yeomanry, a British Army squadron
- RBY MK 1, an Israeli light armored reconnaissance vehicle

== Other uses ==
- RYB color model
- R. B. Y. Scott (1899–1987), a Canadian minister and Old Testament scholar
- Roman Bravo-Young (born 1999), an American freestyle and folkstyle wrestler
- Pokémon Red, Blue, and Yellow, first games of the Pokémon series
- Rby., standard RHS abbreviation for the orchid nothogenus Rhynchobrassoleya (= Brassavola × Cattleya × Rhyncholaelia), see × Brassolaeliocattleya
