= St. Andrew Memorial Church (South Bound Brook, New Jersey) =

Mother church of the Ukrainian Orthodox Church of the USA

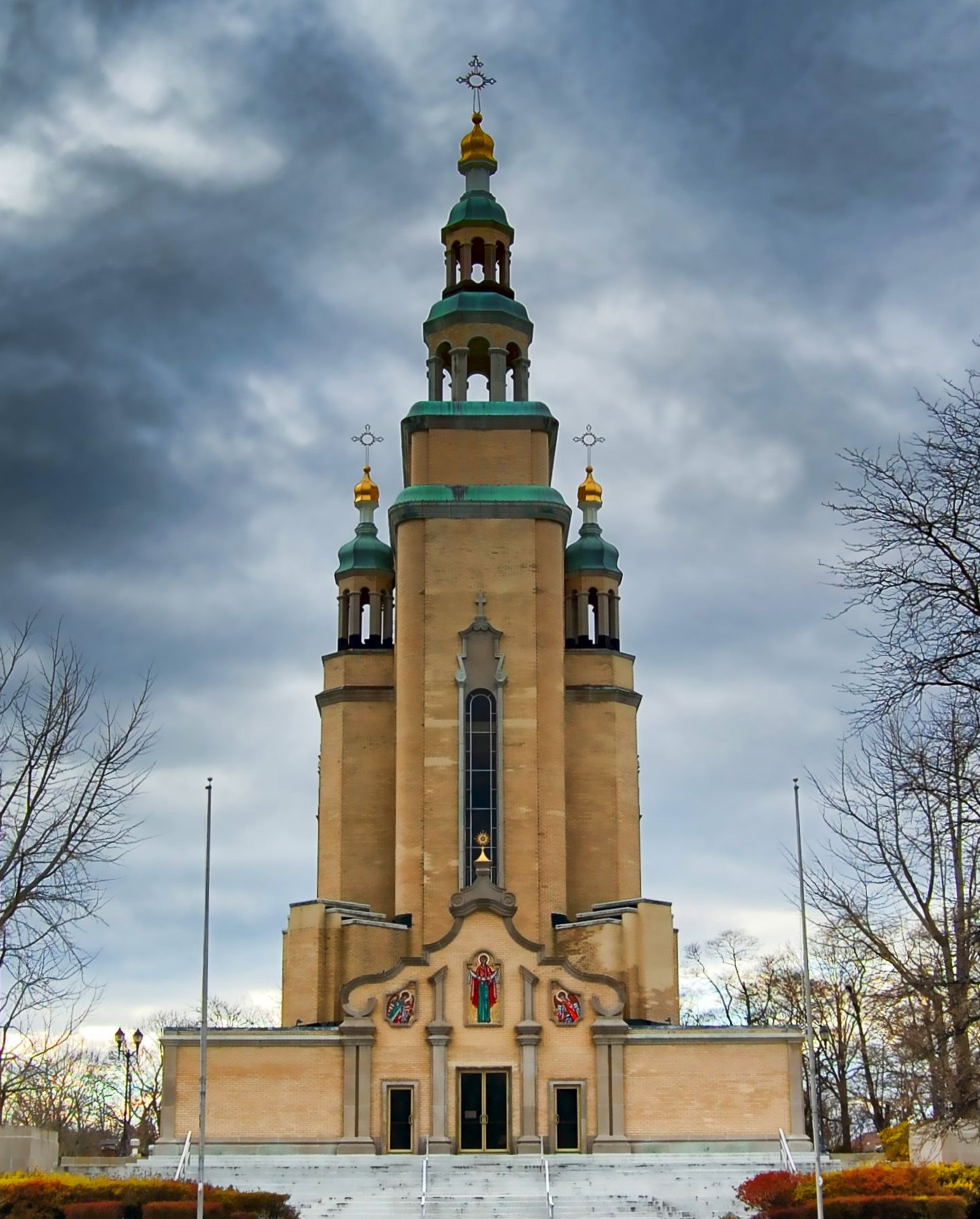
- The church in 2008

Religion
- Affiliation: Ukrainian Orthodox Church of the USA
- Rite: Byzantine Rite
- Year consecrated: 1965

Location
- Location: Main St, S. Bound Brook, New Jersey 08880
- Interactive map of St. Andrew Memorial Church
- Coordinates: 40.5464°N 74.5212°W

Architecture
- Type: Cathedral
- Style: Cossack Baroque
- Completed: 1965
- Dome: Three

St. Andrew Memorial Church (Ukrainian: Церква-пам'ятник святого Андрія Первозванного, romanized: Tserkva-pamiatnyk sviatoho Andriia Pervozvannoho, literally the Memorial Church of St. Andrew the First-Called) is a Ukrainian Orthodox cathedral on Main Street, in South Bound Brook, New Jersey, United States. It is the mother church of the Ukrainian Orthodox Church of the USA.

The church is dedicated as a memorial to the victims of the Stalin-era Great Famine of 1932–33, and to all Ukrainians who died in the quest for liberty and national independence.

The idea for a memorial church is credited to Archbishop Mstyslav (Skrypnyk), later Metropolitan, who had lamented in 1942 how many churches and cemeteries, and thus Ukraine's cultural and political leaders, had been destroyed under the Soviets. In 1950, work on his vision began with the acquisition of land in Somerset County. He engaged Ukrainian-Canadian architect George Kodak, who took inspiration from St Andrew's Church, Kyiv. Groundbreaking ceremonies took place on July 21, 1955. The cemetery received its first burial in 1964, the Ukrainian sculptor Serhiy Lytvynenko, and the church was dedicated on October 10, 1965.

The structure is a notable example of Ukrainian Baroque architecture. Later contributions to the interior ornamentation include mosaics and icons by Petro Cholodny the Younger, and woodcarving by Andreas Darahan. It is the focus of the Ukrainian Orthodox Center, whose 100-acre campus includes a cemetery, seminary, library, museum, and other facilities.

The church and cemetery are the site of an annual pilgrimage on the Feast of Saint Thomas the Apostle in support and memory of the Ukrainian Orthodox innocent who perished in the Holodomor, the Chernobyl disaster, and in various conflicts.

In the 1980s two bronze monuments for the church grounds were completed by the sculptor Peter Kapschutschenko. They depict Metropolitan Vasyl Lypkivsky and St. Olga of Kyiv

== St. Andrew Cemetery ==
=== Notable burials ===
- Ivan Bazarko (1910–1989), Polish-born Ukrainian lawyer and political activist
- Mstyslav (Skrypnyk), first Patriarch of Kyiv and all Ukraine
- Pyotr Grigorenko (1907–1987), one of the founders of the human rights movement in the Soviet Union
- Taras Borovets (1908–1981), Ukrainian resistance leader active during the Second World War
