= Danek Mozdzenski =

Canadian sculptor (born 1952)

- Born: 1952 (age 72–73); Edmonton, Alberta
- Known for: Sculptor, amateur paleontologist

Danek Mozdzenski RCA (Polish: Możdżeński, born 1952) is a Canadian sculptor.

== Works ==
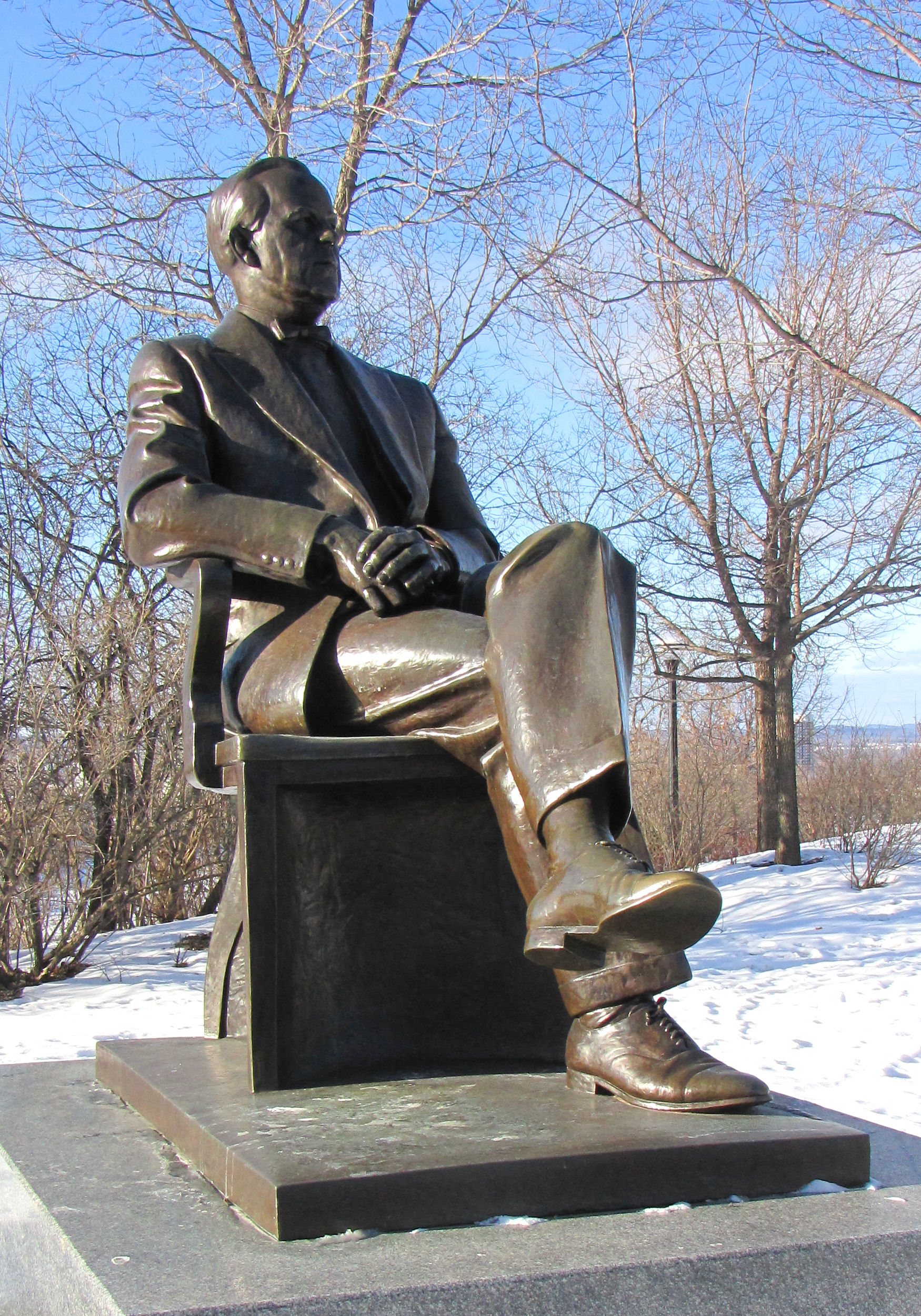
Danek Mozdzenski's Lester B. Pearson sculpture (1989) rests immediately north of the West Block, Parliament Hill, Ottawa, Ontario.

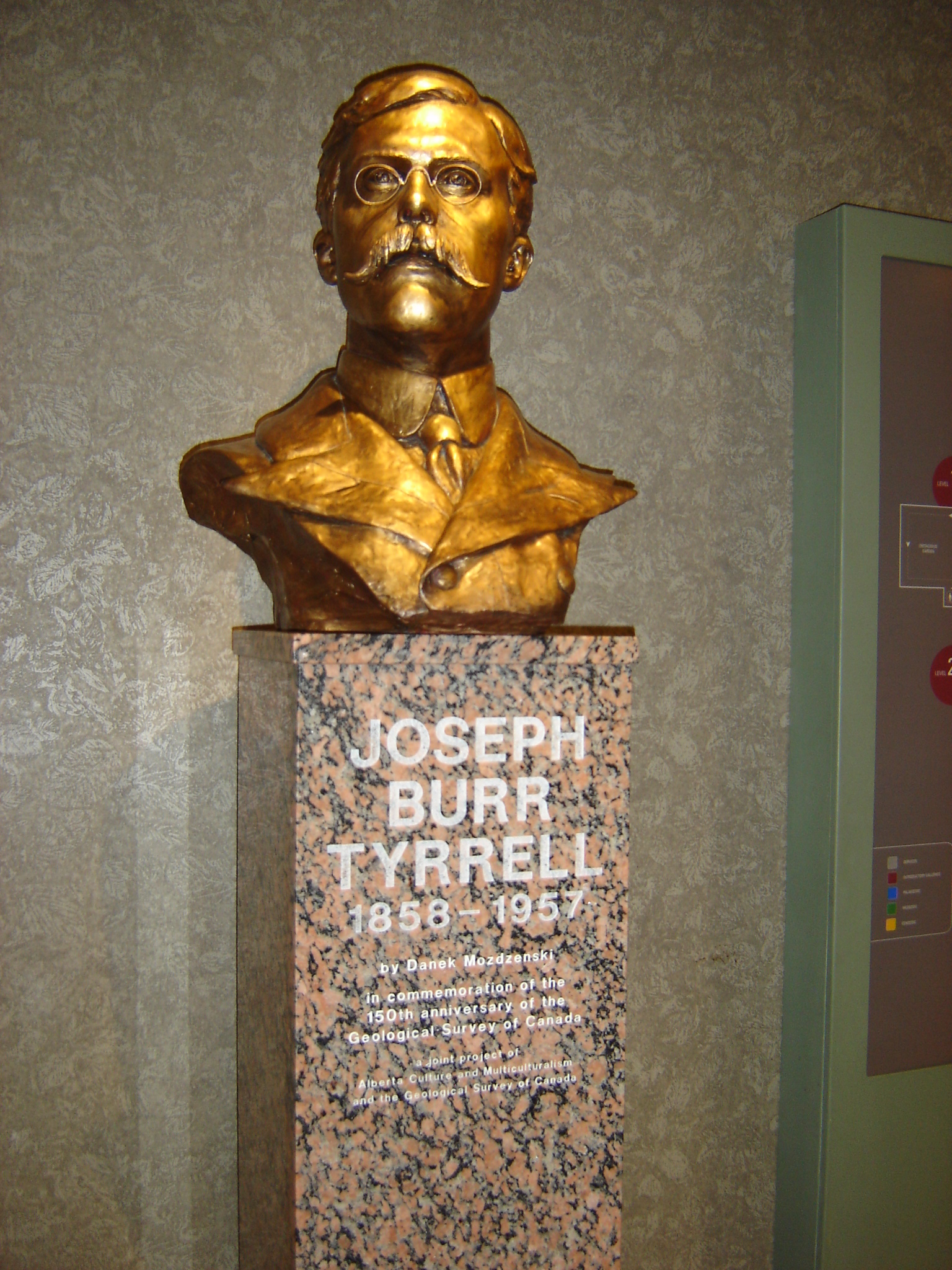
Joseph Tyrrell

- Lois Hole, Alberta's late lieutenant-governor in the Lois Hole library, Edmonton, Alberta;
- Ezio Faraone, late Edmonton Police Service officer near the north end of the High Level Bridge;
- Memorial to firefighters near the Old Strathcona Farmers' Market;
- Crucifix in St. Joseph's Basilica, Edmonton;
- Madonna in St. Theresa Church, Mill Woods;
- bust of Francis Winspear at the Francis Winspear Centre for Music;

== Collections ==
Air Canada, Calgary, AB
Camrose Lutheran College, Camrose, AB
Centennial Library, Edmonton, Alberta
Citadel Theatre, Edmonton, AB
City of Edmonton, Edmonton, AB
City of Red Deer, Red Deer, AB
Edmonton Firefighters Memorial Society, Edmonton, AB
Edmonton Separate School Board, Edmonton, AB
Francis G. Winspear Centre for Music, Edmonton, AB
Government of Alberta, Edmonton, AB
Government of Canada, Ottawa, ON
Queen Elizabeth Planetarium, Edmonton, AB
Royal Tyrrell Museum of Palaeontology
St. Joseph's Basilica, Edmonton, AB
Syncrude Canada Ltd., Fort McMurray, AB
