= Ivan Bazarko =

Polish political activist (1910–1989)

- Bazarko in 1981

5th President of the World Congress of Free Ukrainians
- In office 1981–1983
- Preceded by: Mykola Plaviuk
- Succeeded by: Peter Savaryn

Personal details
- Born: October 6, 1910 Dłużniów, Lublin, Austria-Hungary
- Died: February 10, 1989 (aged 78) New York City, N.Y, United States
- Resting place: St. Andrew Cemetery
- Education: John Paul II Catholic University of Lublin (LLM)
- Occupation: Lawyer and political activist

Ivan Bazarko (Ukrainian: Іван Базарко; 6 October, 1910 – February 10, 1989) was a Polish-born lawyer and political activist of Ukrainian ethnicity, who was elected as the president of the World Congress of Free Ukrainians (WCFU) from 1981 to 1983, and Ukrainian Congress Committee of America (UCCA) from 1966 to 1980. He was noted to be one of the most well-known and influential figures in Ukrainian politics and society.

== Education and early life ==
Bazarko pursued studies law at the John Paul II Catholic University of Lublin in Lublin, journalism in Warsaw, and theology at the spiritual seminary in Przemyśl. He started working as an editor for the Sokal newspapers "Sokal World" (1941–1942) and "Ukrainian News" (1941). As a member of the Prosvita society, he oversaw the management of Germany's internment camps (Straubing, Forchheim, Regensburg) following World War II.

== Career ==
Bazarko moved to New York City in 1949. Director of the UCCA's bureau from 1966 to 1980, after serving as secretary and chairman of the Joint Committee of Ukrainian-American Organizations in New York from 1959 to 1966. He was elected as the president of the WCFU from 1981 to 1983, succeeding Mykola Plaviuk. The WCFU's third congress was held in New York City from November 23–26, 1978, Bazarko and Mykola Plaviuk shared power as president. The presidium published 10,000 copies of the pamphlet "In Search of Freedom: Ukrainians in the Diaspora and in Ukraine" in honor of the Congress. He was involved in the major administration of the Organization for Defense of Four Freedoms for Ukraine and the "Providennia" Union of Ukrainian Catholics for a considerable amount of time after arriving in the United States in 1949.

== Death ==
Bazarko died on February 10, 1989, in New York City. At the St. Andrew Cemetery, the Ukrainian community participated in the funeral ceremonies and burial.

== Personal life ==
Bazarko is married to Natalia, and together they have two sons, Nestor and Volodymyr. Bazarko was a devout Catholic who practiced his religion to the fullest.

== Awards and recognitions ==
Bazarko has earned the following honors:

- Shevchenko Medal of the UCC
- Philadelphia's Ukrainian of the Year (1979)

Political offices
Preceded by Mykola Plaviuk	President of the World Congress of Free Ukrainians; 1981–1983	Succeeded by Peter Savaryn
