= Peter Kapschutschenko =

Ukrainian American sculptor (1915–2006)

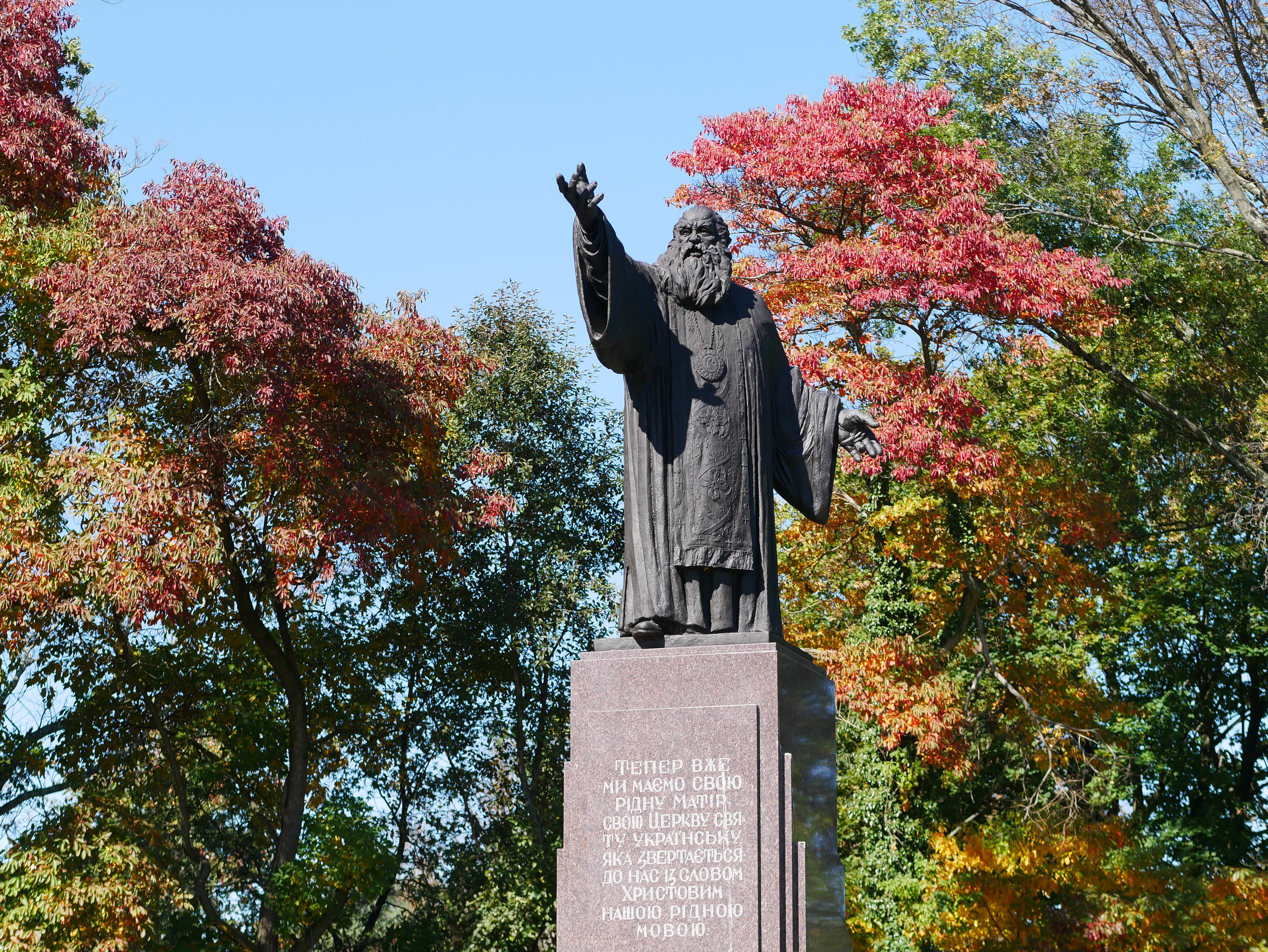
- Kapschutschenko's monument to Vasyl Lypkivsky located in Bound Brook New Jersey
- Born: Petro Kapschutschenko; 1915; Yekaterinoslav Governorate, Russian Empire (now Dnipropetrovsk Oblast, Ukraine)
- Died: 2006 (aged 90–91); Lawrenceville, New Jersey, U.S
- Known for: Sculpture
- Movement: Modernism
- Elected: Order of Merit (Ukraine) (2006)

Peter Kapschutschenko, also referred to as Petro Kapschutschenko or Pedro Enko; (1915-2006) was a Ukrainian and American avant-garde artist and sculptor. Among his works are the bronze monuments of Metropolitan Vasyl Lypkivsky and St. Olga of Kiev (1983 and 1987 respectively) which stand on the grounds of St. Andrew Memorial Church (South Bound Brook, New Jersey).

== Biography ==
Kapschutschenko studied sculpture in his hometown at the Dinpropetrovsk Fine Arts Institute in Ukraine. In 1941, at the age of 26, he was taken to a forced labor camp in Germany during the Reichskommissariat Ukraine. After the war he remained in a Displaced Persons Camp in Regensburg, Germany until 1949, when he resettled in Argentina. Known as Pedro Enko in Argentina, Kapschutschenko continued making sculpture and was appointed Honorary Member of the "Universidad Libre de Humanidades de Buenos Aires" for his outstanding contributions to the culture of Argentina.

In 1963 Kapschutschenko, together with his wife Zoja and daughter Ludmila, relocated to Philadelphia. Teaching at the Ukrainian Art Studio in Philadelphia, his reputation grew and by the 1990s his sculpture had been shown in dozens of exhibitions throughout North America. Following Ukrainian Independence, Kapschutschenko held a series of solo exhibitions at museums in Ukraine including those at the National University Ostroh Academy, and the National Museum Taras Shevchenko. In 2005, he was awarded the Presidential Order of Merit (Ukraine) by President Viktor Yushchenko.

== Artistic themes ==
Kapschutschenko created approximately 7,000 works in terra cotta, bronze and porcelain, among other media. Throughout his career Kapschutschenko focused on Ukrainian motifs in his work, often portraying tableaus of Cossack life. Additionally Kapschutschenko created sculptural portraits of several important Ukrainian figures including Ivan Mazepa and Taras Shevchenko.

== Public collections ==
Among the public collections holding works by Petro Kapschutschenko are:

- Ukrainian Museum (New York)
- Expocenter of Ukraine (Kyiv)
- National University Ostroh Academy (Ostroh)
- Loyola University Maryland Baltimore Maryland
