= Charles William Mayo =

American physician

Charles William Mayo (July 28, 1898 – July 28, 1968) was an American surgeon and a member of the board of governors of the Mayo Clinic beginning in 1933. He was the son of Mayo Clinic co-founder Charles Horace Mayo and Edith (Graham) Mayo.

== Life ==
In addition to his skill as a surgeon, he was also known as a medical administrator whose work was key in the development of group medical practice. He chaired the Mayo Foundation, and the board of regents at the University of Minnesota. He also had a role in the United Nations, appointed by President Dwight D. Eisenhower, and was elected president of the American Association for the United Nations in February 1954.

Born in Rochester, Minnesota, Mayo graduated from Princeton University in 1921. He then received his medical degree from University of Pennsylvania in 1926 and his master's degree in surgery from University of Minnesota in 1931. He (and his son) trained at Robert Packer Hospital in Sayre, Pennsylvania. Mayo taught at University of Minnesota and was a professor of surgery. During World War II, Mayo served in the United States Army Medical Corps with the rank of colonel.

Activated in January 1943, the 71st Army General Hospital personnel were commanded by Drs Charles W. Mayo and James T. Priestley II. The 2 Mayo army hospital units were sent to New Guinea in January 1944. The 233rd station hospital was positioned in Nadzab and the 237th at Finschafen. These hospitals provided the first treatment for casualties evacuated by air from the campaign against Japanese occupation in this area. In 1945, the hospitals were moved to the Philippines to treat casualties from the Okinawa campaign.

He and his wife Alice had six children. He died in a motor vehicle accident on his 70th birthday, near Rochester, Minnesota.

== Selected works ==
- Mayo, Charles William. Surgery of the Small & Large Intestine, Year Book Medical Publishers, 1962.
- Mayo, Charles William. Mayo: the Story of My Family and My Career, Doubleday, 1968.
