= R. B. Y. Scott =

Canadian biblical scholar and Protestant minister (1899–1987)

The Reverend R. B. Y. Scott FRSC
- Born: Robert Balgarnie Young Scott; 16 July 1899; Toronto, Ontario, Canada
- Died: 1 November 1987 (aged 88); Toronto, Ontario, Canada
- Spouses: Kathleen Cordingley (died 1979); Ruth Trethewey Secord

Ecclesiastical career
- Religion: Christianity (Presbyterian)
- Church: United Church of Canada
- Ordained: 1926

Academic background
- Education: University of Toronto
- Thesis: The Original Language of the Apocalypse (1928)

Academic work
- Discipline: Biblical studies
- Sub-discipline: Biblical archaeology; Old Testament studies
- Institutions: Union College of British Columbia; United Theological College; McGill University; Princeton University

Robert Balgarnie Young Scott FRSC (1899–1987), known as R. B. Y. Scott, was a minister of the United Church of Canada and an Old Testament scholar.

== Biography ==
Scott was born on 16 July 1899 in Toronto, Ontario, the son of John McPherson Scott (a Presbyterian Church in Canada minister). He was a graduate of Knox College, University of Toronto, and the University of Toronto where he received a Bachelor of Arts degree in 1922, a Master of Arts degree in 1924, and a Doctor of Philosophy degree in 1928. His thesis for his doctorate in philosophy was titled "The Original Language of the Apocalypse". He was ordained in the United Church of Canada in 1926.

He started teaching at Union College of British Columbia in Vancouver in 1928. In 1931, he moved to Montreal where he was a professor of Old Testament language and literature at the United Theological College. From 1948 until 1955, he taught Old Testament at McGill University. In 1947, he became the first Dean of the Faculty of Divinity at McGill University. He was a member of the World Council of Churches from 1949 to 1955.

In 1951, he "helped recover several fragments of the Dead Sea Scrolls ... that had found their way into the hands of private dealers in Bethlehem."

In 1955, he was appointed the Danforth Professor of Religion in the new Department of Religion at Princeton University. He was chairman of the department from 1963 to 1965. He retired in 1968. He was President of the Canadian Society of Biblical Studies from 1971 to 1972.

He is noted for his staunch support for the social gospel ethos of the United Church, both at Princeton and at home in Canada and for some 10 of his 24 hymns, many written in the cause of the Fellowship for a Christian Social Order, especially the social gospel hymn "O Day of God, Draw Nigh" which is found in the hymnals of the United Church of Canada, the Anglican Church of Canada, the Presbyterian Church in Canada, the joint hymnal of the Uniting, Anglican, Roman Catholic, Lutheran, and Church of Christ churches of Australia, and in hymnals of British and US churches. It was sung at Westminster Abbey at the memorial service for John Smith, the leader of the British Labour Party.

His published writings include Towards the Christian Revolution (1936), Relevance of the Prophets (1953); Treasures from Judaean Caves (1955); The Psalms as Christian Praise (1958); Proverbs and Ecclesiastes (1965) in the Anchor Bible Series; The Way of Wisdom, (1971)

He died on 1 November 1987 in Toronto.

Academic offices
New office	Dean of Divinity at McGill University; 1948–1949	Succeeded by James S. Thomson
