= L.Y. Cairns School =

7-12 school in Edmonton, Alberta (est. 1969)

Location
- 10510 45 Ave NW; Edmonton, Alberta, AB T6H 0A1; Canada
- 53.4837°N 113.5009°W

Information
- Founded: 1969
- School district: Edmonton Public Schools
- Principal: Errol Johnson
- Grades: 7–12
- Mascot: Colts
- Website: lycairns.epsb.ca

L.Y. Cairns School is a Grade 7 to Grade 12 school in Edmonton, Alberta, Canada, specializing towards disabled students with moderate to severe deficits. The school, built starting in 1968 and opened in 1969, is named after Supreme Court of Alberta judge and University of Alberta Chancellor Laurence Yeomans Cairns. In the 2018–2019 school year the school had 429 students enrolled.

Since the year the school opened, it has maintained an annual tradition of the school staff – including members of the Edmonton Police Service School Resource Officer Unit (since its own founding) – serving a Christmas lunch to the students.
