= Luther Hakunavanhu =

Canadian gridiron football player (born 1996)

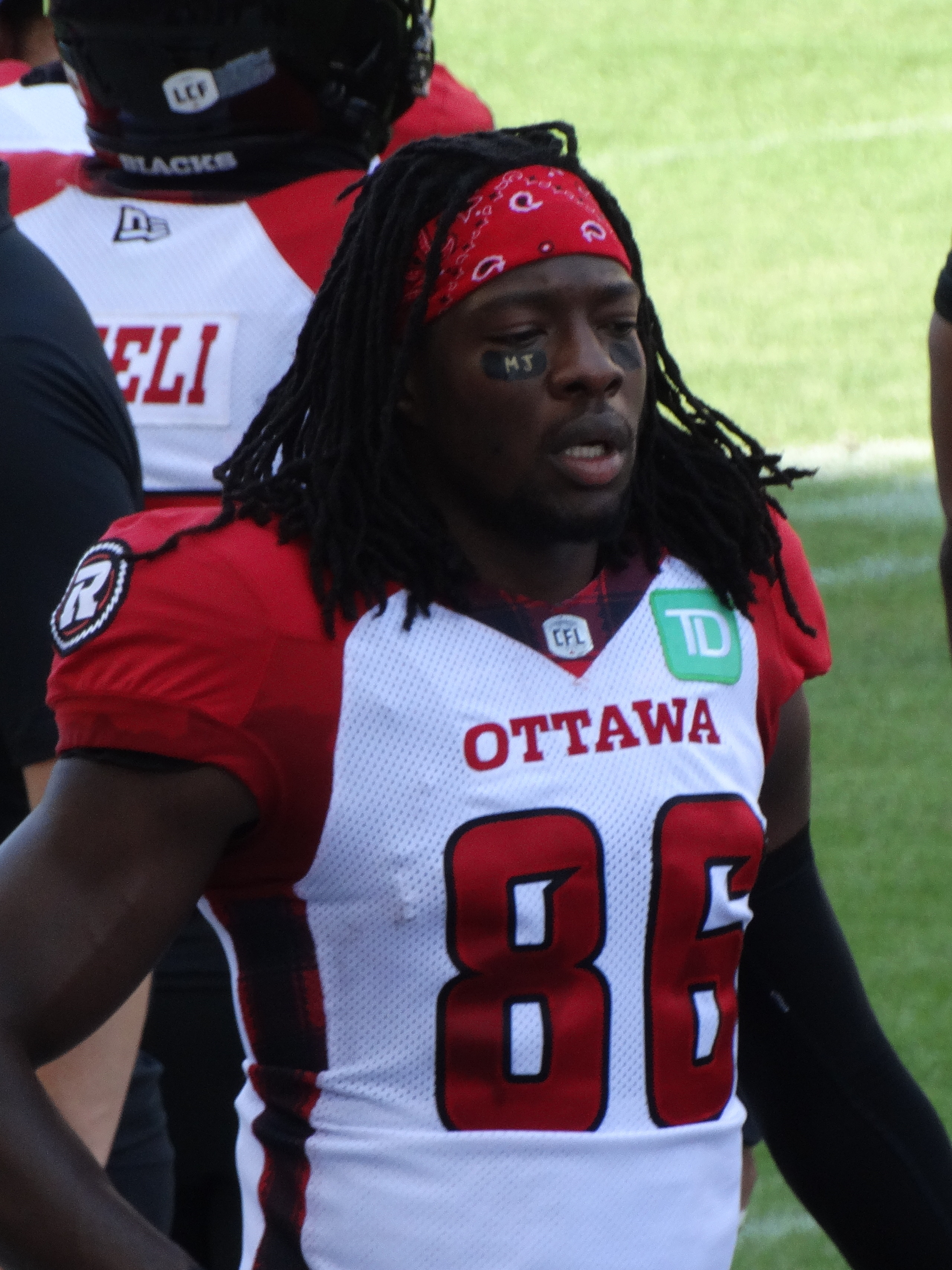
- Hakunavanhu with the Ottawa Redblacks in 2025

Profile
- Position: Wide receiver

Personal information
- Born: August 23, 1996 (age 30); Gweru, Zimbabwe
- Listed height: 6 ft 4 in (1.93 m)
- Listed weight: 198 lb (90 kg)

Career information
- High school: McNally High
- University: York
- CFL draft: 2021: 5th round, 44th overall pick

Career history
- 2021–2023: Calgary Stampeders
- 2024: Hamilton Tiger-Cats
- 2025: Ottawa Redblacks
- Stats at CFL.ca

Luther Hakunavanhu (born August 23, 1996) is a Zimbabwean-Canadian professional football wide receiver. He most recently played for the Ottawa Redblacks of the Canadian Football League (CFL).

== University career ==
Hakunavanhu played U Sports football for the York Lions from 2017 to 2019. He did not play in 2020 due to the cancellation of the 2020 U Sports football season.

== Professional career ==
Pre-draft measurables
Height	Weight	40-yard dash	20-yard shuttle	Three-cone drill	Broad jump	Bench press
6 ft 3 7/8 in (1.93 m)	207.4 lb (94 kg)	4.63 s	4.40 s	7.23 s	10 ft 2 1/8 in (3.10 m)	7 reps
All values from CFL Combine

=== Calgary Stampeders ===
Hakunavanhu was drafted in the fifth round, 44th overall, in the 2021 CFL draft by the Stampeders and signed with the team on May 18, 2021. He played in his first professional game on September 17, 2021, against the Hamilton Tiger-Cats, where he had four catches for 88 yards, including his first career reception on a 74-yard catch. In his third game, on October 16, 2021, Hakunavanhu scored his first career touchdown on a 16-yard pass from Bo Levi Mitchell in a game against the BC Lions. In his rookie season, he played in four games where he had eight receptions for 201 yards and two touchdowns.

In 2022, Hakunavanhu played in 15 regular season games where he had 26 receptions for 330 yards and three touchdowns. He had similar statistics in 2023 here he played in 16 games and had 23 catches for 311 yards and three touchdowns. He became a free agent upon the expiry of his contract on February 13, 2024.

=== Hamilton Tiger-Cats ===
On February 13, 2024, it was announced that Hakunavanhu had signed a two-year contract with the Hamilton Tiger-Cats. He dressed in eight regular season games where he had nine receptions for 171 yards and four touchdowns. He was with the team in training camp in 2025, but was part of the final cuts on June 1, 2025.

=== Ottawa Redblacks ===
On June 9, 2025, it was announced that Hakunavanhu had signed a practice roster agreement with the Ottawa Redblacks. He dressed in the final 17 games of the regular season and recorded one catch for five yards. He became a free agent upon the expiry of his contract on February 10, 2026.
