= James S. Thomson =

Canadian academic

The Very Reverend James Sutherland Thomson FRSC

President of the University of Saskatchewan
- In office 1937–1949
- Preceded by: Walter Charles Murray
- Succeeded by: Walter P. Thompson

17th Moderator of the United Church of Canada
- In office 1956–1958
- Preceded by: George Dorey
- Succeeded by: Angus J. MacQueen

Personal details
- Born: April 30, 1892 Stirling, Scotland
- Died: November 18, 1972 (aged 80) Montreal, Quebec

James Sutherland Thomson FRSC (April 30, 1892 – November 18, 1972) was a Canadian academic and Christian minister, the president of the University of Saskatchewan, and the 17th Moderator of the United Church of Canada.

== Biography ==
Born in Stirling, Scotland, Thomson was educated at the University of Glasgow. He studied theology at Trinity College, Glasgow, and was ordained in the Church of Scotland in 1920. Upon moving to Canada in 1930, he accepted an appointment as professor of systematic theology and philosophy of religion at Pine Hill Divinity Hall (now part of the Atlantic School of Theology) in Halifax, Nova Scotia. From 1937 to 1949, he was the second president of the University of Saskatchewan. During World War II, he was the general manager of the Canadian Broadcasting Corporation from 1942 to 1943.

In 1949, he became dean of the newly formed Faculty of Divinity at McGill University and also served there as professor of religious studies. He retired as dean in 1957. From 1956 to 1958, he served as Moderator of the United Church of Canada, elected by the 17th General Council at their meeting in Windsor, Ontario. He was made a Fellow of the Royal Society of Canada in 1942. In 1967 the Ryerson Press published The Church in the Modern World, a collection of essays in his honour.

Religious titles
Preceded by George Dorey	Moderator of the United Church of Canada; 1956–1958	Succeeded by Angus J. MacQueen
Academic offices
Preceded by Walter Charles Murray	President of the University of Saskatchewan; 1937–1949	Succeeded by Walter P. Thompson
Preceded by R. B. Y. Scott	Dean of Divinity at McGill University; 1949–1957	Succeeded by Stanley B. Frost
