= Walter P. Thompson =

Canadian academic (1889-1970)

Walter P. Thompson CC

President of the University of Saskatchewan
- In office 1949–1959
- Preceded by: James S. Thomson
- Succeeded by: John Spinks

Personal details
- Born: Walter Palmer Thompson; April 3, 1889 Decewsville, Ontario, Canada
- Died: March 30, 1970 (aged 80)

Walter Palmer Thompson CC (April 3, 1889 – March 30, 1970) was a Canadian academic and former President of the University of Saskatchewan.

== Biography ==
Born near Decewsville, Ontario, he received a BA in 1910 from the University of Toronto, an MA in 1912 and a Ph.D. in 1914 both from Harvard University. In 1913 he joined the University of Saskatchewan as Professor and Head of the Biology Department. In 1934 he was appointed Dean of Junior Colleges; in 1938 he became Dean of Arts and Sciences; in 1942 he was Acting President; in 1948 he was Director of Summer School; and in 1949 he became President of the University. He retired in 1959. After he stepped down as university president, Thompson served as chair of the Advisory Planning Committee on Medical Care for the province of Saskatchewan.

In 1967 he was made a Companion of the Order of Canada.

== See also ==
- James Walter Thompson

Professional and academic associations
Preceded by Harold Innis	President of the Royal Society of Canada; 1947–1948	Succeeded by Gustave Lanctot
