= Eric Newell =

Chancellor of the University of Alberta
- In office 2004–2008
- Preceded by: John Thomas Ferguson
- Succeeded by: Linda Hughes

Personal details
- Born: December 16, 1944 (age 81) Kamloops, British Columbia
- Education: University of British Columbia
- Occupation: oil executive

Eric Patrick Newell, OC, AOE, (born December 16, 1944) was the 17th chancellor of the University of Alberta, having previously served as chair of its board of governors. He is a former chairman and CEO of the oil company Syncrude.

In 1999, he was made an Officer of the Order of Canada for being an "advocate of business and education partnerships" and promoting "employment and business opportunities for Aboriginal people." In 2004, he was awarded the Alberta Order of Excellence.

As an undergraduate he attended the University of British Columbia, and is an alumnus of the Theta chapter of Sigma Phi Delta.
