= Ralph B. Young =

Canadian real estate developer

Chancellor of the University of Alberta
- In office 2012–2020
- Preceded by: Linda Hughes
- Succeeded by: Peggy Garritty

Personal details
- Born: 1945 (age 80–81) Saskatoon, Saskatchewan
- Education: University of Alberta; University of Saskatchewan; Queen's University
- Occupation: Real estate developer

Ralph Barclay Young AOE (born 1945), is a Canadian real estate developer. He has served as the Chancellor of the University of Alberta since 2012. He is the former CEO of Melcor Developments. Young attended the University of Alberta, University of Saskatchewan, and Queen's University.
