= James Taggart Priestley =

American physician

James Taggart Priestley II
- Born: April 7, 1903; Des Moines, Iowa
- Died: February 7, 1979; Indian River County, Florida
- Education: University of Pennsylvania (M.D., 1926); Mayo Medical School (Ph.D., 1932)
- Years active: 1933–1968
- Medical career
- Profession: Surgeon
- Institutions: Mayo Clinic

James Taggart Priestley II (April 7, 1903 – February 9, 1979) was a senior surgeon at the Mayo Clinic and a pioneer of pancreatectomy.

== Biography ==
At the University of Pennsylvania, he graduated with a B.A. in 1923, and an M.D. in 1926. From 1926 to 1928 he was a medical intern in surgery at the Hospital of the University of Pennsylvania. As a fellow in surgery at the Mayo Medical School (now known as the Mayo Clinic Alix School of Medicine), he earned an M.Sc. in experimental surgery in 1931, followed by a Ph.D. in surgery in 1932. At the Mayo Clinic, he became a staff member in 1933 and the head of a section of surgery in 1934, retaining the post for then next 34 years. During World War II, he served as an officer in the Medical Corps of the U.S. Army.

Activated in January 1943, the 71st Army General Hospital personnel were commanded by Drs Charles W. Mayo and James T. Priestley II. The 2 Mayo army hospital units were sent to New Guinea in January 1944. The 233rd station hospital was positioned in Nadzab and the 237th at Finschafen. These hospitals provided the first treatment for casualties evacuated by air from the campaign against Japanese occupation in this area. In 1945, the hospitals were moved to the Philippines to treat casualties from the Okinawa campaign.

Priestley was awarded the Bronze Star Medal and the oak leaf cluster for his services during the war.

At the Mayo Clinic he was appointed senior surgeon in 1963 and retired in 1968. He wrote surgical reports with his colleagues, including Edward Starr Judd (1878–1935), Waltman Walters (1895–1988), Howard Kramer Gray (1910–1955), and John M. Waugh (1905–1962). Priestley was a coauthor of several surgical textbooks, including Cancer of the Stomach (1964, W. B. Saunders).

For one year from 1953 to 1954, Priestley was the president of the Central Surgical Association, which was founded in 1941. In April 1965 the Mayo Clinic Surgical Society in Honor of James T. Priestley was formed by his former residents and fellows at Mayo Clinic. In 1967 he was appointed an honorary Fellow of the Royal College of Surgeons of England.

In 1930 James T. Priestley, a descendant of Joseph Priestley, married Klea Kirkman Palica (1907–2000). Upon his death from a heart attack while on vacation, he was survived by his widow, three daughters, a son, and twelve grandchildren. James Taggart Priestley was named after his paternal grandfather and named his own son James Taggart Priestley III.
