= Erast Huculak =

Ukrainian and Canadian businessman

Erast Huculak CM
- Ераст Гуцуляк
- Born: December 3, 1930; Równe, Poland (now Rivne, Ukraine)
- Died: March 2, 2013 (aged 82); Toronto, Ontario, Canada
- Occupations: entrepreneur, pharmacist

Erast R. Huculak CM (Ukrainian: Ераст Гуцуляк, romanized: Erast Hutsuliak; December 3, 1930 – March 2, 2013) was a Ukrainian and Canadian businessman. He was president of Medical Pharmacies Group and founder of the Canadian Children of Chornobyl Foundation, as well as head of the Ukrainian Canadian Congress in Oshawa (1966; 1973–1974). In 1993 he served as an adviser to the Prime Minister of Ukraine. From 2004 to 2013 he was the Honorary Consul of Ukraine in Canada.

== Biography ==
Huculak was born in Rivne, then part of Poland (today Ukraine). He was the son of the historian and geographer Mykhailo Hutsulyak.

He attended the Rivne Gymnasium. From 1945 to 1948, he and his family lived in displaced persons camps in Karlsfeld (near Munich) and Berchtesgaden. In the summer of 1948 he emigrated with his family to Vancouver. There he held various jobs: washing cans at a dairy, plucking chickens at a restaurant, and working as a waiter. His father insisted that he continue his education, and Erast eventually graduated from King Edward High School and enrolled in the School of Pharmacy at the University of British Columbia, from which he graduated in 1955.

After graduating from university in 1955, he opened a small pharmacy in Oshawa, which later grew into the "Medical Pharmacies Group", which operates a chain of pharmacies in Ontario and employs more than 600 people in the province. His company is considered one of the largest in Canada in terms of supplying medications to homes where frail and elderly people live. At the age of 35, Huculak became a millionaire.

He was one of co-founders of Canadian Children of Chornobyl Foundation. In 1966 and from 1973 to 1974 he served as a head of the Ukrainian Canadian Congress in Oshawa. In 1989, he established the Huculak Chair of Ukrainian Culture and Ethnography at the University of Alberta.

In 1993 he was appointed as an Adviser to the Prime Minister of Ukraine. From 2004 to 2013 he was the Honorary Consul of Ukraine in Canada.

Erast Huculak died on March 2, 2013, in Toronto, Ontario.

== Awards ==
In 2001 Huculak received an honorary degree from the University of Alberta.

- 2001: Second Class of the Order of Merit of Ukraine
- 2006: Member of the Order of Canada
- 2013: Queen Elizabeth II Diamond Jubilee Medal
