= Walter Edgar Harris =

Canadian chemist (1915–2011)

- Born: June 9, 1915; Wetaskiwin, Alberta, Canada
- Died: October 21, 2011 (aged 96); Edmonton, Alberta, Canada
- Education: University of Alberta; University of Minnesota
- Awards: Member of the Order of Canada
- Scientific career
- Fields: Chemistry
- Workplaces: University of Alberta

Walter E. Harris CM FRSC (9 June 1915 – 21 October 2011) was a Canadian analytical chemist and academic.

Born near Wetaskiwin, Alberta, he received Bachelor of Science (1938) and Master of Science (1939) degrees from the University of Alberta and a PhD in Analytical Chemistry from the University of Minnesota during World War II. Harris returned to the University of Alberta in 1946 to teach, and was a professor until 1980, at which time he was granted the title professor emeritus. He served as the Chair of the Department of Chemistry from 1974 to 1980. In 1998, he was honoured by being made a Member of the Order of Canada.
