= Shirley Marie Stinson =

Canadian nursing leader (1929–2020)

Shirley Marie Stinson, OC (December 10, 1929 – June 4, 2020) known as the "architect of nursing research" was a Canadian nursing leader who made major contributions to nursing graduate education in Alberta and nursing research internationally. She was the first Alberta nurse to earn a doctorate, and the first woman and first nurse to be awarded a Canadian federal title of “Senior National Health Research Scientist”. She was President of the Canadian Nurses Association, served in an advisory role to the World Health Organization, received four honorary doctoral degrees, and was appointed Officer of the Order of Canada in 2001.

== Early life ==
Shirley Marie Stinson was born on December 10, 1929, in Arelee, Saskatchewan, Canada to parents Edwin and Mary (Ismond) Stinson. She was the second of three children in the family. The family moved to Tofield, Alberta, Canada in 1935, and Alberta became her home province from then on. As a teenager in Tofield in the 1940s, she dreamed of becoming an architect like her idol Frank Lloyd Wright. Even though her career took a different path into nursing, she had a mind for design and later became known as the "architect of nursing research in Canada".

== Education ==
Shirley Stinson received a BSc in Nursing from the University of Alberta in 1953, a Master of Nursing Administration from the University of Minnesota in 1958, and a Doctor of Education from Columbia University in 1969. She was the first nurse in Alberta to hold a doctorate.

== Career ==
In her early career, Stinson worked as a public health staff nurse in Alberta. She became a faculty member at the University of Alberta in 1969 in Edmonton, Alberta, Canada, and was the first nurse in Canada to have a joint appointment between a Faculty of Nursing and Faculty of Medicine. Her leadership led to the establishment of the first Master of Nursing program in Western Canada and the first Doctoral Nursing program in Canada, both at the University of Alberta in 1975 and 1991, respectively. She was an advocate for nursing research, and was the first to obtain funding for nursing research in the Western World with $1 million being awarded from the Alberta Government. This helped to establish the Alberta Foundation for Nursing Research in 1982 of which she was the inaugural chair until 1988. She was Chair of the first International Nursing Research Conference in North America in 1986. She worked to improve nursing policies and practices around the world. She was President of the Canadian Nurses Association. She served as consultant/advisor globally to several organizations, including the World Health Organization, the Pan American World Health Organization, and the Colombian Nurses Association. She authored over 150 publications.

== Death ==
Stinson died on June 4, 2020, at the age of 90 in Edmonton, Alberta, Canada, from complications due to Parkinson's Disease. The impact of her work continues to enhance the field of nursing.

== Honours, awards and distinctions ==
Stinson received many honours, awards, and distinctions.:

- Canada's first woman and first nurse to be given a federal Senior National Health Scientist Research Award
- First Alberta nurse to earn a doctorate degree
- Granted an Honorary Doctor of Law from the University of Calgary
- Granted an Honorary Doctor of Science from Memorial University
- Granted an Honorary Doctor of Science from the University of Alberta
- Granted an Honorary Doctor of Sacred Letters from St. Stephens College at the University of Alberta
- Appointed to Officer of the Order of Canada
- Recipient of the Jeanne Mance Award from the Canadian Nurses Association and the Ross Award in Nursing Leadership from the Canadian Nurses Foundation (the two highest nursing awards in Canada)
- Inducted into the Alberta Order of Excellence
- Recipient of the Canada Centennial Medal
- Recipient of the Queen's Golden Jubilee Medal
- Inducted into the Columbia University Nursing Hall of Fame
- Named to University of Minnesota School of Nursing's Top 100 Distinguished Alumni
