= Walter Charles Murray =

Canadian professor

Walter Charles Murray (12 May 1866 – March 23, 1945) was the first President of the University of Saskatchewan.

Born in Kings County, New Brunswick, he received a Bachelor of Arts degree from the University of New Brunswick in 1886. In 1891, he received a Master of Arts degree from the University of Edinburgh. From 1892 to 1908, he was a professor at Dalhousie University. From 1908 to 1937, he was the President of the University of Saskatchewan. The city of Saskatoon named "Murray Place" in the Dundonald area in Walter C. Murray's honor.

== Legacy ==
Walter Murray Collegiate Institute, a high school in Saskatoon, Saskatchewan, Canada, was named after Walter Murray. Murray building in the University of Saskatchewan and President Murray Park in Saskatoon are named after him.

Academic offices
Preceded by New Position	President of the University of Saskatchewan; 1908–1937	Succeeded by James S. Thomson
