= Ross Flemington =

William Thomas Ross Flemington
- Born: October 11, 1897; Britannia, NL
- Died: July 10, 1971 (aged 73)
- Known for: president of Mount Allison University and the first New Brunswick ombudsman

The Reverend William Thomas Ross Flemington, CC (October 11, 1897 – July 10, 1971) was president of Mount Allison University (1945 to 1962) and the first New Brunswick ombudsman (1967 to 1971).

He was principal chaplain overseas during World War II. In 1971 he was made a Companion of the Order of Canada "for his services as an educator, a theologian and public servant".

Academic offices
Preceded by George Johnstone Trueman	President of Mount Allison University; 1945-1962	Succeeded by William Stanley Hayes Crawford (Acting)
