= Jean Forest =

Canadian politician (1926–2024)

The Honourable Jean Beatrice Forest OC

Canadian Senator from Alberta
- In office 1996–1998
- Appointed by: Jean Chrétien

Chancellor of the University of Alberta
- In office 1978–1982
- Preceded by: Ronald Norman Dalby
- Succeeded by: Peter Savaryn

Personal details
- Born: Jean Beatrice Janz; July 24, 1926 Minitonas, Manitoba, Canada
- Died: January 10, 2024 (aged 97) Victoria, British Columbia, Canada
- Spouse: Rocky Forest
- Occupation: Politician; educator; businesswoman

Jean Beatrice Forest OC (née Janz; July 24, 1926 – January 10, 2024) was a Canadian politician, educator, and businesswoman. She represented Alberta in the Senate of Canada from 1996 to 1998.

== Biography ==
Born Jean Beatrice Janz in Minitonas, Manitoba, she moved to Alberta with her husband Rocky in 1947. She was appointed to Alberta's first Human Rights Commission in 1974 and to the Minister's Advisory Committee on the constitution in 1978. She was Chancellor of the University of Alberta from 1978 to 1982.

Forest was appointed to the Senate of Canada in 1996 representing Edmonton. She resigned in 1998 because of concerns for her husband's health.

In 1987, she was made an Officer of the Order of Canada in recognition for being "a highly respected educator, businesswoman and active participant in community affairs".

An all-girls Catholic Junior High School started in 2005 in Edmonton, Alberta, is named after Jean Forest, called the Jean Forest Leadership Academy or JFLA.

Forest died in Victoria, British Columbia on January 10, 2024, at the age of 97.
