= Peter Savaryn =

Ukrainian-born Canadian lawyer and Waffen-SS veteran (1926–2017)

Peter Savaryn CM

6th President of the World Congress of Free Ukrainians
- In office 1983–1988
- Preceded by: Ivan Bazarko
- Succeeded by: Yuri Shymko

Chancellor of the University of Alberta
- In office 1982–1986
- Preceded by: Jean Beatrice Forest
- Succeeded by: Tevie Miller

Personal details
- Born: September 17, 1926 Zubrets, Second Polish Republic (now in Ternopil Oblast, Ukraine)
- Died: April 6, 2017 (aged 90) Edmonton, Alberta, Canada
- Party: Progressive Conservative
- Spouse: Olga Prystajecky
- Education: University of Alberta
- Occupation: Lawyer

Military service
- Allegiance: Germany
- Branch/service: Waffen-SS
- Unit: SS Galizien

Peter Savaryn CM (September 17, 1926 – April 6, 2017) was a Polish born Ukrainian-Canadian lawyer, Twelfth Chancellor of the University of Alberta, President of the Ukrainian World Congress, and President of the Progressive Conservative Party of Canada. Savaryn died on April 6, 2017, at the age of 90.

== Early life ==
Peter Savaryn was born on September 17, 1926 in the village of Zubrets, Buchach County, Ternopil Voivodeship, Polish Republic (now Chortkiv district, Ternopil region, Ukraine).

In 1944, at the age of 17, Savaryn joined the 14th Waffen Grenadier Division of the SS (1st Galician). During his war service he was tasked with covering the retreat of German soldiers during the westward advances of the Soviet Union into Occupied Ukrainian Territory.

Savaryn was among the approximately 2,000 former Galicia members allowed to immigrate to Canada.

== Life in Canada ==
Savaryn arrived in Canada in 1949, and attended the University of Alberta (B.A. 1955, LLB 1956). Savaryn was a partner in the law firm Savaryn & Savaryn. He was married to Olga (Olya) Prystajecky (1951) with whom he had three children. He served as Chancellor of the University of Alberta from 1982 to 1986 and was involved with the university Board of Governors and Senate.

Savaryn was the president of the Ukrainian World Congress, at the time called the World Congress of Free Ukrainians, from 1983 to 1988. He was also president of the Progressive Conservative Association of Alberta and vice-president of the Progressive Conservative Party of Canada.

Savaryn was awarded an honorary degree in 1987 from the University of Alberta, and was also awarded Order of Canada the same year. He died on April 6, 2017.

== Legacy ==
Although allegations have been made about Savayrn's military service, attempting to associate him with the Holocaust, no evidence has ever been presented to show that he had ever committed a war crime, or assisted the Nazis in their war crimes. His service was limited to front line military roles. Jars Balan - the former Director of Canadian Institute of Ukrainian Studies at the University of Alberta - speculated that Savaryn's military service was likely motivated by a desire to form a Ukrainian National Army in the wake of the German retreat in 1944, and that due to the nature of the political landscape of Ukraine at the time, these men of military age had limited choices between assisting the Germans, or the Russians - either militarily, or in a forced labour camp. He speculates that the resurgence in interest in the war record of Savaryn is due to Russian disinformation campaigns to associate the Ukrainian people as a whole with Nazism.

In 1985, then Prime Minister Brian Mulroney ordered an investigation to determine whether Canada was harbouring Nazi war criminals. The 1986 report from the Commission of Inquiry on War Criminals in Canada showed that charges of war crimes against members of the Galicia Division have never been substantiated, and concluded that in the absence of evidence of participation in or knowledge of specific war crimes, mere membership in the Galicia Division is insufficient to justify prosecution.

In 2023 - after the Canadian government honoured fellow SS Galician veteran Yaroslav Hunka - Savaryn's military record has been called into question. In a response to an enquiry from The Forward magazine, Canadian governor general Mary Simon expressed "deep regret" for Savaryn's award of the Order of Canada. The University of Alberta was pressured to reject or return over a million dollars of endowments from former members of the Galicia Division. Some of these endowments are reportedly from Savaryn's estate. The University of Alberta is reportedly reviewing the case.

In 2007 a road in the Summerside neighbourhood in Edmonton, Alberta, was named "Savaryn Drive" in honour of Peter Savaryn. In 2025 The Friends of Simon Wiesenthal Center campaigned the city to change the name in response to Savaryn's military service. The city says that to rename the road would require an area resident or business to make the request, and that 75 per cent of impacted home, building, and business owners would need to support it.

Political offices
Preceded by Ivan Bazarko	President of the World Congress of Free Ukrainians; 1983–1988	Succeeded by Yuri Shymko
Academic offices
Preceded by Jean Beatrice Forest	Chancellor of the University of Alberta; 1982–1986	Succeeded by Tevie Miller
