= Frank C. Ford =

Canadian lawyer

Frank Ford

Chancellor of the University of Alberta
- In office 1942–1946
- Preceded by: Alexander Cameron Rutherford
- Succeeded by: George Fred McNally

Justice of the Supreme Court of Alberta
- In office May 3, 1926 – October 13, 1954

Personal details
- Born: March 4, 1873 Toronto, Ontario, Canada
- Died: March 21, 1965 (aged 92) Edmonton, Alberta, Canada
- Education: University of Toronto
- Occupation: Lawyer

Military service
- Branch/service: Canadian Militia
- Rank: Lieutenant Colonel
- Unit: 20th Halton Rifles
- Commands: 95th Saskatchewan Rifles

Frank C. Ford (March 4, 1873 – March 21, 1965) was a Canadian lawyer and judge. He served on the Supreme Court of Alberta from 1926 to 1954, and served as the Chancellor of the University of Alberta from 1942 to 1946.

== Early life and legal career ==
Frank C. Ford was born in Toronto on March 4, 1873, to James and Catherine (née Poole) Ford. He attended Trinity College at the University of Toronto, where he earned a Bachelor of Arts, and later studied at Osgoode Hall receiving a Bachelor of Laws. He subsequently obtained a Doctor of Civil Law degree from the University of Toronto in 1895.

Ford articled in Toronto with Read, Read and Knight from 1890 to 1893, and with McCarthy, Osler, Hoskin and Creelman from 1893 until he was called to the Ontario bar in 1895. Additionally, from 1893 to 1897, he served as private secretary to member of Parliament Dalton McCarthy.

In 1897, Ford became a partner with Denton, Dods and Ford, remaining there until 1898. He then served as private secretary to Arthur Sturgis Hardy, Premier and Attorney General of Ontario, and subsequently to John Morison Gibson, Attorney General of Ontario. In 1900, he was appointed Solicitor to the Treasury, a position he held until 1903. He later became a partner at McCarthy, Osler, Hoskin and Harcourt.

Ford moved west in 1904. In 1906, he was appointed Deputy Attorney General for Saskatchewan, serving until 1910, after which he relocated to Edmonton. He also joined the Canadian Militia and became a captain with the 20th Halton Rifles. Ford was also promoted to Major in the militia and later to Lieutenant Colonel taking command of the newly formed 95th Saskatchewan Rifles.

Ford was appointed King's Counsel in Saskatchewan in 1907, Ontario in 1910, and Alberta in 1913.

== Judicial career ==
Ford was appointed to the Supreme Court of Alberta, Trial Division, at Edmonton on May 3, 1926. He was elevated to Alberta's appellate court on November 3, 1936, and served there until his retirement on October 13, 1954. Ford was described as a "meticulous and exacting judge", and was known for sharing his judicial notebooks with journalists to assist them in reporting of his decisions.

During his time on the bench, Ford was appointed as the Chancellor of the University of Alberta from 1941 to 1946.

Ford was considered one of the top candidates from Alberta for appointment to the Supreme Court of Canada during the 1940s, although he was never appointed.

== Personal life ==
In 1899, Ford married Nora Elizabeth Sampson in Toronto. They had four children: Katherine, Francis Armour, D'Alton M., and F.K. In 1920, Nora died, and on July 30, 1923, Ford married Jane Duff Kerr of Edinburgh, Scotland.

He received honorary Doctor of Laws (LL.D.) degrees from the University of Alberta in 1946 and from Laval University in 1947. He served as Chancellor of the Edmonton Diocese of the Anglican Church of Canada from 1913 to 1943.

Ford died on March 21, 1965.
