= McGill School of Religious Studies =

Unit of McGill University in Montreal, Canada

Coordinates: 45.50659°N 73.57742°W

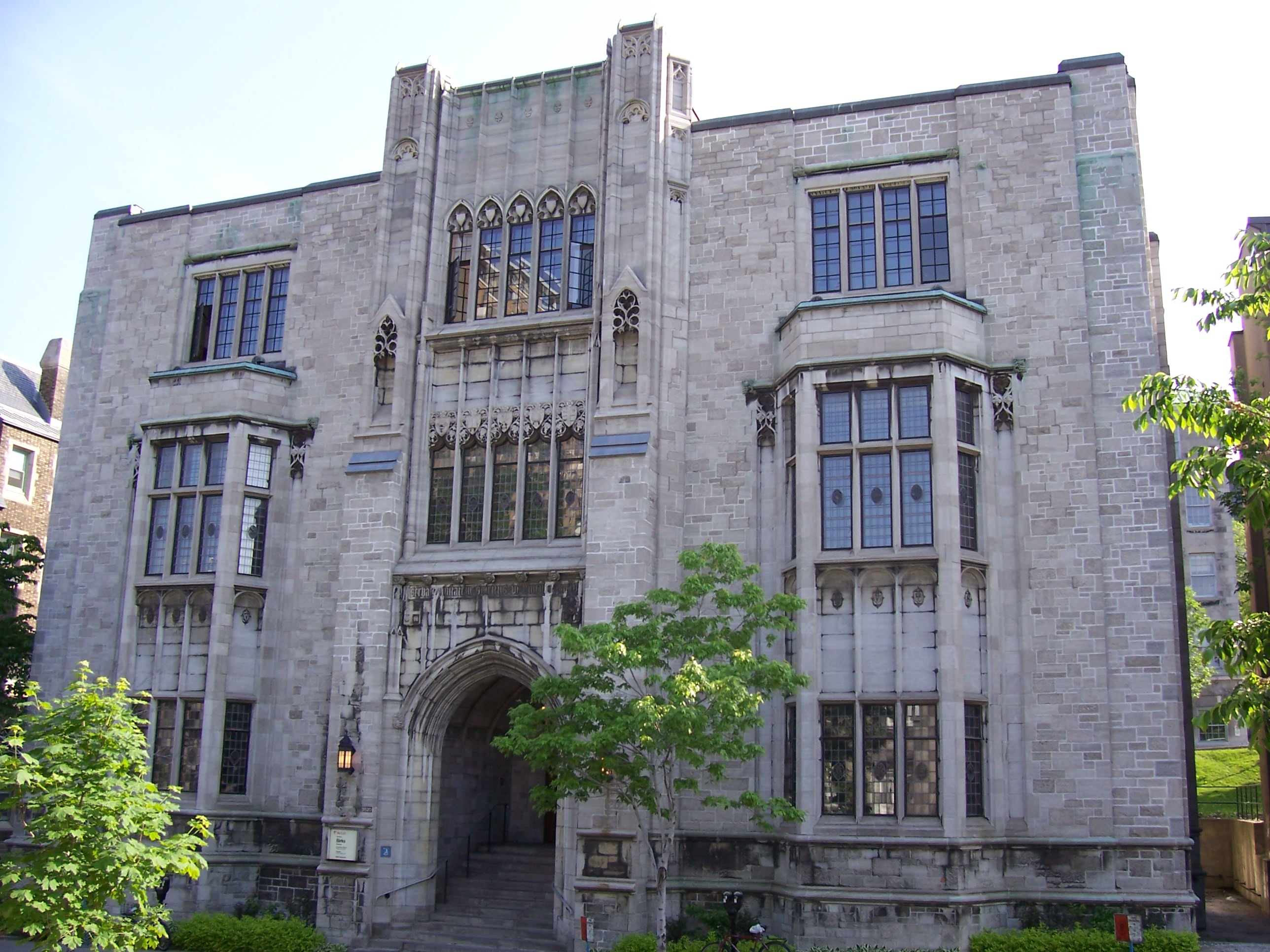
- William and Henry Birks Building, McGill University Faculty of Religious Studies
- Type: School of Religious Studies at McGill University
- Established: 1912 as Joint Board of Religious Studies; 1948 as Faculty of Divinity Studies
- Affiliations: McGill University; The Presbyterian College
- Location: Montreal, Quebec, Canada
- Campus: Urban
- Website: mcgill.ca/religiousstudies

In May 2016, McGill University established the School of Religious Studies in the Faculty of Arts which provides a range of Undergraduate and Post Graduate programs.

The school incorporates many methods and disciplines, mixing the focused historical study of religious traditions with approaches that explore contemporary expressions of religions and public policy.

== History ==
The School of Religious Studies is located in the William and Henry Birks Building. The building was designed by the Canadian architect Harold Lea Fetherstonhaugh, a student of Percy Erskine Nobbs, in the Collegiate Gothic style. Construction began in 1929 and was completed in 1931. The building was originally owned by the Joint Board of Theological Colleges. It was known by its original name, Divinity Hall, until 1972, when it was renamed in honor of Canadian businessman Henry Birks and one of his sons.

== See also ==
- Higher education in Quebec
- List of universities in Quebec
