= Patricia Blocksom =

Canadian lawyer

Patricia Blocksom is a Canadian lawyer and arbitrator with a specialization in matrimonial law.

== Education and career ==
Blocksom enrolled at the University of Lethbridge in 1976 and later earned a Bachelor of Laws degree from the University of Calgary Faculty of Law in 1982. She became a partner at Dunphy Best Blocksom in 1990.

== Awards and honors ==
- In 2001, Blocksom was made a Fellow of the International Academy of Matrimonial Lawyers.
- In 2006, she received the John Haynes Memorial Award from the Alberta Family Mediation Society.
- In 2011, Blocksom was inducted into the Alberta Order of Excellence.
- Blocksom was also the recipient of the 2011 Canadian Bar Association Touchstone Award.
