= Tevie Miller =

Tevie Harold Miller

Chancellor of the University of Alberta
- In office 1986–1990
- Preceded by: Peter Savaryn
- Succeeded by: Sandy Mactaggart

Personal details
- Born: January 1, 1928 Edmonton, Alberta
- Died: August 21, 1996 (aged 68) Edmonton, Alberta
- Spouse: Arliss Miller (Toban)
- Education: University of Alberta
- Occupation: lawyer

Tevie Harold Miller (January 1, 1928 – August 21, 1996) was a Canadian lawyer and judge. He served as Chancellor of the University of Alberta from 1986 to 1990.

Miller was born in Edmonton to Abe Miller, a lawyer, and Rebecca Griesdorf Miller. He attended the University of Alberta (BA 1949, LLB 1950) and was a lawyer. He appeared as a lawyer before the Supreme Court of Canada four times in his career. He unsuccessfully contested the 1968 Canadian federal election as a member of the Liberal Party in the electoral district of Edmonton West. He was appointed as a judge in 1974. From 1984 to 1993, he was Associate Chief Justice of the Court of Queen's Bench. He also served on the Supreme Court of the Northwest and Yukon Territories as a Deputy Judge. Miller was a member of the University of Alberta's Board of Governors and Senate, and elected to serve as Chancellor from 1986 to 1990. In 1996, he died of pancreatic cancer.
