= Leone Hellstedt =

Canadian/Swedish pathologist and psychoanalyst

- Born: 19 January 1900; Carnduff, Northwest Territories, Canada
- Died: July 2, 1977; Stockholm, Sweden
- Education: University of Alberta Faculty of Medicine and Dentistry (M.D.); University of Minnesota (Ph.D.)
- Scientific career
- Fields: Pathology; Psychoanalysis

Leone Hellstedt, née McGregor (born 19 January 1900-July 2, 1977), was a Canadian/Swedish pathologist and psychoanalyst.

== Life and work ==
Leone Hellstedt was born near Carnduff, Northwest Territories (in today's Saskatchewan), Canada on 19 January 1900. Partially homeschooled, she graduated from high school at age 15 and needed a waiver to enroll in the local teacher's training school. She started at the University of Alberta Faculty of Medicine and Dentistry in 1919 and was awarded her M.D. degree six years later, receiving the gold medal for the highest average score in her classes. After graduation, Hellstedt was offered a fellowship at the University of Minnesota to work on her doctorate in pathology. After completing it in 1929, she was awarded a National Research Council Fellowship to study pathology at the Harvard Medical School under Frank Burr Mallory. Interested in kidney disease, Hellstedt was awarded a grant to study under Theodore Fahr, an expert in that field, at Hamburg, Germany.

She met her husband, Folke Hellstedt, in Germany. They married in 1932 and moved to Stockholm, capital of Sweden, where they had a son and a daughter together.

Hellstedt soon learned that there was no need for pathologists in Sweden and she decided to become a psychoanalyst. She started training at the Neurology Clinic in Zurich, Switzerland and attended Carl Jung's lecture course. Although she was forced to repeat two years of medical training, in 1937 Hellstedt became one of only three foreign physicians to be licensed to practice in Sweden. She was awarded an honorary degree of Doctor of Science by the University of Alberta in 1977. Shortly later she returned to Sweden where she died on July 2.

She was buried alongside her husband in Ekilstuna, near Stockholm.
