= Ronald Norman Dalby =

Canadian engineer (1929–2014)

Chancellor of the University of Alberta
- In office 1974–1978
- Preceded by: Louis Armand Desrochers
- Succeeded by: Jean Forest

Personal details
- Born: September 5, 1929 Edmonton, Alberta
- Died: October 28, 2014 (aged 85) Calgary, Alberta
- Spouse: Elsie
- Education: University of Alberta
- Occupation: Engineer

Ronald Norman Dalby (September 5, 1929 – October 28, 2014) was a Canadian engineer. He served as chancellor of the University of Alberta from 1974 to 1978. Dalby was born in Edmonton and attended primary schooling there. He attended the University of Alberta and graduated in 1952 with a Bachelor of Science degree in civil engineering. He then worked as a manager for Imperial Oil and Northwestern Utilities. From 1967 to 1968 and from 1973 to 1974, he was president of the Association of Professional Engineers, Geologists, and Geophysicists of Alberta. Dalby continued to work in the utility industry as an executive, and was vice president of Canadian Utilities Limited when he was elected chancellor of the University of Alberta in 1984. He died in 2014.
