= Earle Parkhill Scarlett =

Chancellor of the University of Alberta
- In office 1952–1958
- Preceded by: George Fred McNally
- Succeeded by: L. Y. Cairns

Personal details
- Born: June 27, 1896 High Bluff, Manitoba, Canada
- Died: June 14, 1982 (aged 85) Calgary, Alberta, Canada
- Education: University of Manitoba; University of Toronto
- Occupation: physician

Earle Parkhill Scarlett (June 27, 1896 − June 14, 1982) was a Canadian physician. He served as Chancellor of the University of Alberta from 1952 to 1958.

Scarlett was born in Manitoba in 1896. He attended the University of Manitoba and earned a BA in 1916. He served in World War I with the Canadian Machine Gun Corps. He then attended medical school at the University of Toronto and practiced as a physician in the United States before moving to Calgary.

Dr. E.P. Scarlett High School in Calgary is named after him.
