= L. Y. Cairns =

L. Y. Cairns QC

Chancellor of the University of Alberta
- In office 1958–1964
- Preceded by: Earle Parkhill Scarlett
- Succeeded by: Francis Philip Galbraith

Personal details
- Born: May 19, 1892 Winnipeg, Manitoba, Canada
- Died: July 27, 1967 (aged 75) Edmonton, Alberta, Canada
- Spouse: Jean
- Children: three
- Education: University of Alberta
- Occupation: lawyer, judge

Laurence Yeomans Cairns QC (May 19, 1892 – July 27, 1967) was a Canadian lawyer and judge. He served as Chancellor of the University of Alberta from 1958 to 1964.

Cairns was born in Winnipeg, Manitoba. He attended the University of Alberta, graduating in its inaugural class of 1912 with a Bachelor of Arts degree. In 1915, he earned a Doctor of Laws (LLB) degree from the university. He was a veteran of World War I, and later was a lawyer in Edmonton. He was appointed King's Counsel in 1935 and was a judge on the District Court of Northern Alberta and on the Supreme Court of Alberta. In 1950, he was President of the Alberta Law Society. Cairns also served as an Edmonton Public School Board trustee in the 1930s, and as Chairman of the Edmonton Public School Board. Cairns contested the 1940 Alberta general election for the Edmonton electoral district as an independent, while he came sixth in first ballot votes, he would not receive enough support on later ballots to be elected. Cairns died in 1967. L.Y. Cairns School in Edmonton, opened in 1969, is named for him.
