= C. Fred Bentley =

Canadian soil scientist

- Born: March 14, 1914; Cambridge, Massachusetts
- Died: April 12, 2008 (aged 94)
- Education: University of Alberta; University of Minnesota.
- Scientific career
- Fields: Soil Science
- Workplaces: University of Saskatchewan; University of Alberta

C. Fred Bentley, OC AOE FRSC (March 14, 1914 – April 12, 2008) was a Canadian soil scientist.

Born in Cambridge, Massachusetts, he received a Bachelor of Science degree in 1939 and a Master of Science degree in 1942 from the University of Alberta. He received a Ph.D. in 1945 from the University of Minnesota.

In 1943, he joined the University of Saskatchewan as an instructor and then assistant professor of soil science. In 1946, he became an assistant professor of soil science at the University of Alberta, eventually becoming a professor. From 1959 to 1968, he was also the dean of the Faculty of Agriculture. In 1979, he was appointed a professor emeritus.

From 1972 to 1982, he was a member and the first chairman of the governing board of ICRISAT in Hyderabad, India. From 1983 to 1987, he was chairman of the board of trustees of the International Board for Soil Research Management.

He was inducted into the Alberta Order of Excellence in 1987. In 1994, he was made an Officer of the Order of Canada "for his contribution to agriculture and food production" He was a Fellow of the Royal Society of Canada.
