= Lois Hole =

Canadian politician (1929–2005)

The Honourable Lois Hole CM AOE DStJ

15th Lieutenant Governor of Alberta
- In office 10 February 2000 – 6 January 2005
- Monarch: Elizabeth II
- Governor General: Adrienne Clarkson
- Premier: Ralph Klein
- Preceded by: Bud Olson
- Succeeded by: Norman Kwong

Personal details
- Born: Lois Elsa Veregin; 30 January 1929 Buchanan, Saskatchewan, Canada
- Died: 6 January 2005 (aged 75) Edmonton, Alberta, Canada
- Spouse: Ted Hole (1952–2003; his death)
- Profession: Author businesswoman horticulturalist educator

Lois Elsa Hole, CM, AOE DStJ (née Veregin; 30 January 1929 – 6 January 2005) was a Canadian politician, businesswoman, academician, professional gardener and best-selling author. She was the 15th Lieutenant Governor of Alberta from 10 February 2000 until her death on 6 January 2005. She was known as the "Queen of Hugs" for breaking with protocol and hugging almost everyone she met, including journalists, diplomats and other politicians.

== Early life and family ==
Lois Elsa Veregin was born in Buchanan, Saskatchewan, to Michael M. Veregin and Elsa Viktoria Norsten in 1929, not 1933, as was later misreported. Her family moved to Edmonton, Alberta in 1948, where she completed her education at Strathcona Composite High School.

In 1950, she met Ted Hole, a young University of Alberta agriculture student. Several years later they married and moved to a 200-acre (0.81 km^{2}) farm near St. Albert, Alberta. Lois and Ted Hole ran a successful market garden business from their farm which they, along with their sons Bill and Jim, incorporated as Hole's Greenhouses & Gardens Ltd. in 1979. It remained one of Western Canada's largest retail greenhouse stores until it closed in early 2011 when the Hole family moved the operation to their new site on the edge of Lois Hole Centennial Provincial Park, and opened the Enjoy Centre.

=== Personal education and involvement in education ===
She received her secondary education at Strathcona High School (now known as Old Scona Academic High School) and then her ATCM (her associates diploma) in Music from the Royal Conservatory of Music, Toronto, Ontario.

In 1983, she was awarded an honorary doctorate Doctor of Athabasca University and in 1997 received a Distinguished Citizen Honorary Diploma in Business from Grant MacEwan College and in 2000 received an Honorary Doctorate in Laws from the University of Alberta. In 2003, she received an Honorary Degree in Horticulture from Olds College, Olds, Alberta.

She was a school trustee at St. Albert School District No. 6 in 1998, was a trustee and chairperson, Sturgeon School Division, was on the Athabasca University Governing Council, and Chancellor of University of Alberta, 1998–2000.

She was the Keynote speaker at the Alberta College Graduation Ceremony in 2000, at Strathcona Composite High School Commencement ceremony in 2001, and at the Strathcona Composite High School commencement ceremony in 2003.

=== Writings ===
In 1993, Hole wrote her first book, Vegetable Favourites, and went on to write five more in the "Favourites" series. There are currently more than 1,000,000 copies of the various books in this series in print. The series won the Educational Media Award from the Professional Plant Growers Association in 1996. In 1998, Hole's Greenhouse began publishing their own books starting with Hole's autobiographical I'll Never Marry a Farmer. She also wrote several books with her son, Jim. Hole's Greenhouse has continued to publish gardening books along with a successful annual magazine, Lois' Spring Gardening.

== Lieutenant governor ==
Hole was appointed Lieutenant Governor of Alberta by Prime Minister Jean Chrétien in December 1999, and assumed office on 10 February 2000. One of her first acts as Lieutenant Governor was to discuss with Premier Ralph Klein over his government's controversial legislation which expanded the role of private providers in public health care, nonetheless she pledged to avoid a constitutional crisis and signed the bill into law.

=== Ted and Lois Hole's deaths ===
During his wife's term in office, Ted Hole died of cancer in April 2003. Lois Hole had been diagnosed with abdominal cancer in 2002, making a public announcement the following year when she began treatment in early 2003. Her health improved, temporarily, but by late 2004, her case was terminal. Her illness prevented her from making several scheduled public appearances. She died in office at the Royal Alexandra Hospital in Edmonton on 6 January 2005, aged 75.

A public memorial was held for Hole at Edmonton's Winspear Centre. Governor General of Canada Adrienne Clarkson was criticized for failing to attend Hole's memorial service. Rideau Hall issued a statement saying the Governor General was, at the time, abroad representing Canada at the inauguration of the President of Ukraine, Victor Yushchenko. However, the inauguration was postponed, and it was felt that Clarkson could have returned to Canada for the service. When it was later reported by the Toronto Sun and The Globe and Mail that Clarkson would wait in Paris, France, for the rescheduled presidential investiture, more outrage was expressed in the press, which was only compounded when Rideau Hall informed the public that the Governor General would also attend a "long-standing engagement" with the Queen at Sandringham House, contradicting reports that Buckingham Palace had said the dinner was actually booked at the last minute. In response, some monarchists began lobbying Clarkson to resign, had she willingly used the Queen for publicity and damage control purposes.

Most sources cited 1933 as Lois Hole's year of birth based on her reported age at death. However, the Edmonton Journal, the Royal Alberta United Services Institute's newsletter and the Legislature of Alberta all indicate that she was born in 1929. The Office of the Lieutenant Governor of Alberta confirmed that Hole was born on 30 January 1929.

== Awards and legacy ==
She was appointed a Member of the Order of Canada in 1999 and a Dame of Justice of the Most Venerable Order of the Hospital of St John of Jerusalem in 2000. In 1995, she was named Edmonton Business and Professional Woman of the Year and St. Albert's Citizen of the Year. In 2003 she was awarded the Gandhi, King, Ikeda Humanitarian Award. She was made an "Honorary Patricia" by the 1st Battalion Princess Patricia's Canadian Light Infantry.

The Alberta Library Trustees Association (ALTA) established the Lois Hole Award in 2001. In November 2004, two months before Lois Hole's death, the Capital Health Authority in Edmonton announced that a new wing of the Royal Alexandra Hospital would be named the Lois Hole Hospital for Women. It opened 13 April 2010 and consolidated the women's health programs and services based at the Royal Alexandra Hospital into one building.

On 19 April 2005, the Lois Hole Centennial Provincial Park was established, becoming the 69th provincial park in Alberta. The park contains the former Big Lake Natural Area and an additional 302 hectares of Crown land, for a total of 1421 hectares. The lake comprises approximately 59 percent of the park's total area.

In 2008 the Edmonton Public Library opened the Lois Hole Library in Callingwood North. It features a sculpture of Lois Hole by Danek Mozdzenski and a reading garden. In 2009, the City of St. Albert declared 14 May to be Lois Hole Day. A bronze statue designed by Barbara Paterson called A Legacy of Love and Learning was unveiled at city hall on this day.

== Bibliography ==
- Lois Hole's Vegetable Favourites (originally published as Northern Vegetable Gardening)
- Lois Hole's Bedding Plant Favourites (originally published as Northern Flower Gardening: Bedding Plants)
- Lois Hole's Perennial Favourites
- Lois Hole's Tomato Favourites
- Lois Hole's Rose Favourites
- Lois Hole's Favourite Trees & Shrubs
- I'll Never Marry a Farmer
- Herbs & Edible Flowers
- The Best of Lois Hole
- Lois Hole's Favourite Bulbs
- Bedding Plants Q&A (with son Jim Hole)
- Roses Q&A (with son Jim Hole)
- Perennials Q&A (with son Jim Hole)
- Vegetables Q&A (with son Jim Hole)
- Trees & Shrubs Q&A (with son Jim Hole)
- Lois' Spring Gardening annual magazine 1998–2008
- Lois Hole Speaks: Words that Matter (collected speeches, edited by Mark Lisac, published posthumously)

== Arms ==
Coat of arms of Lois Hole
Adopted 16 September 2002 Crest Issuant from a circlet of roses Argent and roses Gules, a demi lion Or crowned erablé Gules, its dexter paw resting on a closed book Vert clasped Or. Escutcheon Per chevron rompu Or and Vert, the centre section heightened of two points, in chief two wild roses proper, in base an open book Argent bound Or. Supporters Two German shepherds Or gorged with collars of wild roses and prairie lilies proper. Compartment A compartment set with grassy mounds Vert and tapissé of wheat Or. Motto Care and Nurture Symbolism The dividing line represents two peaks of a greenhouse viewed from one end, celebrating Her Honour's pioneering efforts in this field in Alberta. The two wild roses refer to Their Honours' two sons, and the book represents Her Honour's love of learning and long involvement with education. The shield surmounts the Badge of the Most Venerable Order of the Hospital of St John of Jerusalem, and is surrounded by the motto ribbon of the Order of Canada. Below the shield are show the Badges of (from left to right) Dame of Justice of the Order of St John, a member of the Order of Canada, and the Alberta Order of Excellence. The lion refers to Alberta and Saskatchewan, where it appears in the provincial coats of arms; to England, His Honour's ancestral homeland; and to the lion of the arms of the Scottish family of Buchanan, and being a reference to Her Honour's birthplace in Saskatchewan. The maple leaf coronet symbolizes her service to Canada and as the Queen's representative in Alberta, while the roses, repeating the reference to Her Honour's favourite flower, are shown in Canada's national colours. The book represents both Her Honour's long involvement with education as a school trustee and as Chancellor of the University of Alberta, and the importance she attaches to education. The wheat field represents both Saskatchewan and the central part played by this grain in the making of bread, a staple with a great symbolic significance to the Doukhoubors, and hence a strong reference to Her Honour's father. The green grass represents an important element of landscaping and gardening. The German Shepherds were chosen by Her Honour as they are a strong intelligent breed for which Her Honour indicated a preference. Their collars combine the official provincial flowers of Alberta and Saskatchewan.

Academic offices
Preceded by Louis Davies Hyndman	Chancellor of the University of Alberta; 1994–1998	Succeeded by John Thomas Ferguson
