= Louis Armand Desrochers =

Canadian lawyer (1928–2015)

Chancellor of the University of Alberta
- In office 1970–1974
- Preceded by: Francis Philip Galbraith
- Succeeded by: Ronald Norman Dalby

Personal details
- Born: March 31, 1928 Montreal, Quebec
- Died: September 28, 2015 (aged 87) Edmonton, Alberta
- Spouse: Marcelle Boutin
- Children: five
- Education: University of Alberta
- Occupation: lawyer

Louis Armand Desrochers (March 31, 1928 – September 28, 2015) was a Canadian lawyer. He served as Chancellor of the University of Alberta from 1970 to 1974. Desrochers was born in Montreal in 1928 and moved to Jasper, Alberta in his childhood. He was educated in Edmonton at the Collège des Jésuites, Collège Saint-Jean, and then at the University of Ottawa. He completed a law degree at the University of Alberta in 1952 and was a lawyer for Maclab Construction. He also served on the University of Alberta Board of Governors and worked to strengthen connections between Collège Saint-Jean and the university. Three years after he left his position as chancellor, the Collège was integrated as a satellite campus of the University, as the University of Alberta Faculté Saint-Jean. In 2001, Desrochers was named to the Alberta Order of Excellence. He held honorary degrees from the University of Alberta, University of Ottawa, and Laval University. In 1953, he Marcelle Boutin; with her he had five children. Desrochers died in 2015 at the age of 87.
