= Sandy Mactaggart =

Sandy A. Mactaggart

Chancellor of the University of Alberta
- In office 1990–1994
- Preceded by: Tevie Miller
- Succeeded by: Lou Hyndman

Personal details
- Born: Alastair Auld Mactaggart; March 11, 1928 Glasgow, Scotland, UK
- Died: July 3, 2017 (aged 89) Islay, Scotland, UK
- Spouse: Cécile Erickson
- Education: Harvard University

Alastair Auld Mactaggart OC AOE (March 11, 1928 – July 3, 2017), known as Sandy Mactaggart or Sandy Auld Mactaggart, was a Scottish-born Canadian educator and philanthropist.

Mactaggart was born in Glasgow. After being evacuated to Canada during World War II in the late 1930s, he attended schooling at Lakefield College School (Ontario) and at Choate Rosemary Hall (Connecticut). He later attended Harvard University, studying architecture and graduating cum laude in 1950 with a Bachelor of Arts.

He would go on to attend Harvard Business School, receiving a degree in business administration in 1952. That same year he would move to Edmonton, Alberta with Harvard dorm-mate Jean de La Bruyere to found Maclab Enterprises ("Mac"taggart/"La B"ruyere), a property development company. He would involve himself in the local arts and culture scenes of Edmonton, one of the co-founders the Citadel Theatre in 1965, and a founder of the Edmonton Art Gallery.

He is also involved with his alma mater, Harvard, serving on the Harvard Resources Committee and in the leadership of the Harvard Alumni Association as well as the directorship of Harvard Clubs in Canada. He has also served as treasurer of the American University of Beirut, president of the C.D. Howe Institute and Chief Executives Organization, and as a member of the Advisory Board of the Royal Society of Canada.

Mactaggart served on the University of Alberta Board of Governors from 1983 to 1994, on the school's Real Estate Advisory Committee, and as chairman of the University of Alberta Foundation from 1989 to 1994. He was chancellor of the university from 1990 to 1994. During his term as chancellor, he oversaw a period of changes in government funding, and introduced the concept of visiting committees of community leaders invited to tour the campus, a concept he had become aware of via his alma mater, Harvard.

He has donated an area of 40 hectares (99 acres) situated in the Whitemud Creek ravine, the Mactaggart Nature Sanctuary, as well as several pieces of Chinese costumes and art, worth $37 million; to the University of Alberta.

In 2010, he moved to the Bahamas with his wife, Cécile for health reasons, after donating his Edmonton home worth $23 million to the University of Alberta.

He received the James L. Fisher Award from the Council for Advancement and Support of Education in 1995. He was also appointed as an Officer of the Order of Canada in 1997, and the Alberta Order of Excellence in 1998. Sandy Mactaggart Award at the University of Alberta is named after him.

Sandy Mactaggart married Cécile Erickson in 1959. He died on July 3, 2017, in Islay, Scotland, aged 89.
