= Francis Philip Galbraith =

Canadian newspaper editor

Chancellor of the University of Alberta
- In office 1964–1970
- Preceded by: Laurence Y. Cairns
- Succeeded by: Louis Armand Desrochers

Personal details
- Born: December 14, 1896 Guelph, Ontario
- Died: May 16, 1970 (aged 73) Red Deer, Alberta
- Spouse: Clarretta
- Children: 2
- Education: University of Alberta
- Occupation: journalist, newspaper editor

Francis Philip Galbraith (December 14, 1896 – May 16, 1970) was a Canadian newspaper editor. He served as Chancellor of the University of Alberta from 1964 to 1970.

Galbraith was born in Guelph, Ontario and moved to Lethbridge, Alberta in 1906, and Red Deer, Alberta in 1907. His father, Francis Wright Galbraith was the founder of the Red Deer Advocate newspaper and mayor of the city in 1913. Galbraith served in World War I overseas, and was wounded in action in 1916. Upon his return, he worked for his father's newspaper company, and in 1934, took over as editor after his father's death. He was also a member of the Canadian Press and president of the Canadian Weekly Newspapers Association. Galbraith was also a member and president of the Red Deer Board of Trade, an alderman for the Red Deer City Council, and chair of the Red Deer District Planning Commission. He was a member of the Senate of the University of Alberta from 1948 to 1959, and was elected to serve as Chancellor from 1964 to 1970. He died of a heart attack in 1970 while still in office as chancellor.
