= George Fred McNally =

Canadian educator (1878–1965)

Chancellor of the University of Alberta
- In office 1946–1952
- Preceded by: Frank C. Ford
- Succeeded by: Earle Parkhill Scarlett

Personal details
- Born: June 29, 1878 Lower Queensbury, New Brunswick, Canada
- Died: December 4, 1965 (aged 87) Edmonton, Alberta, Canada
- Education: University of Alberta
- Occupation: educator

George Frederick McNally (June 29, 1878 – December 4, 1965) was a Canadian educator. He served as Chancellor of the University of Alberta from 1946 to 1952.

McNally was born in New Brunswick and came to Alberta in 1906 to work as a teacher at the Strathcona Collegiate Institute in Strathcona, Alberta. He received a MA degree from the University of Alberta in 1911. He then worked as a school inspector, and then served as the Deputy Minister of Education of Alberta from 1935 to 1946. as president of the Canadian Education Association from 1938 to 1941. McNally died in 1965. McNally High School in Edmonton is named for him.
