= John Thomas Ferguson =

Canadian real estate developer

Chancellor of the University of Alberta
- In office 2000–2004
- Preceded by: Lois Hole
- Succeeded by: Eric Newell

Personal details
- Born: December 21, 1941 (age 84) Edmonton, Alberta, Canada
- Spouse: Bernice Evelyn McLean (m. 1966)
- Children: 3
- Education: University of Alberta (BComm '64)
- Occupation: Real estate developer

John Thomas Ferguson (born December 21, 1941) is a Canadian real estate developer. He served as Chancellor of the University of Alberta from 2000 to 2004.

Ferguson attended the University of Alberta and earned a Bachelor of Commerce degree in 1964. He worked as a chartered accountant and for an oil and gas company as treasurer and vice president. He founded Princeton Developments Ltd in 1975, a real estate development firm and "world leader in cold-weather climate property development". Ferguson was the Chairman of the University of Alberta Board of Governors from 1994 to 1997.

He received an honorary degree from the University of Alberta in 1998, and was appointed as a Member of the Order of Canada in 2011.
