= Linda Hughes =

Canadian newspaper publisher

Linda Hughes AOE
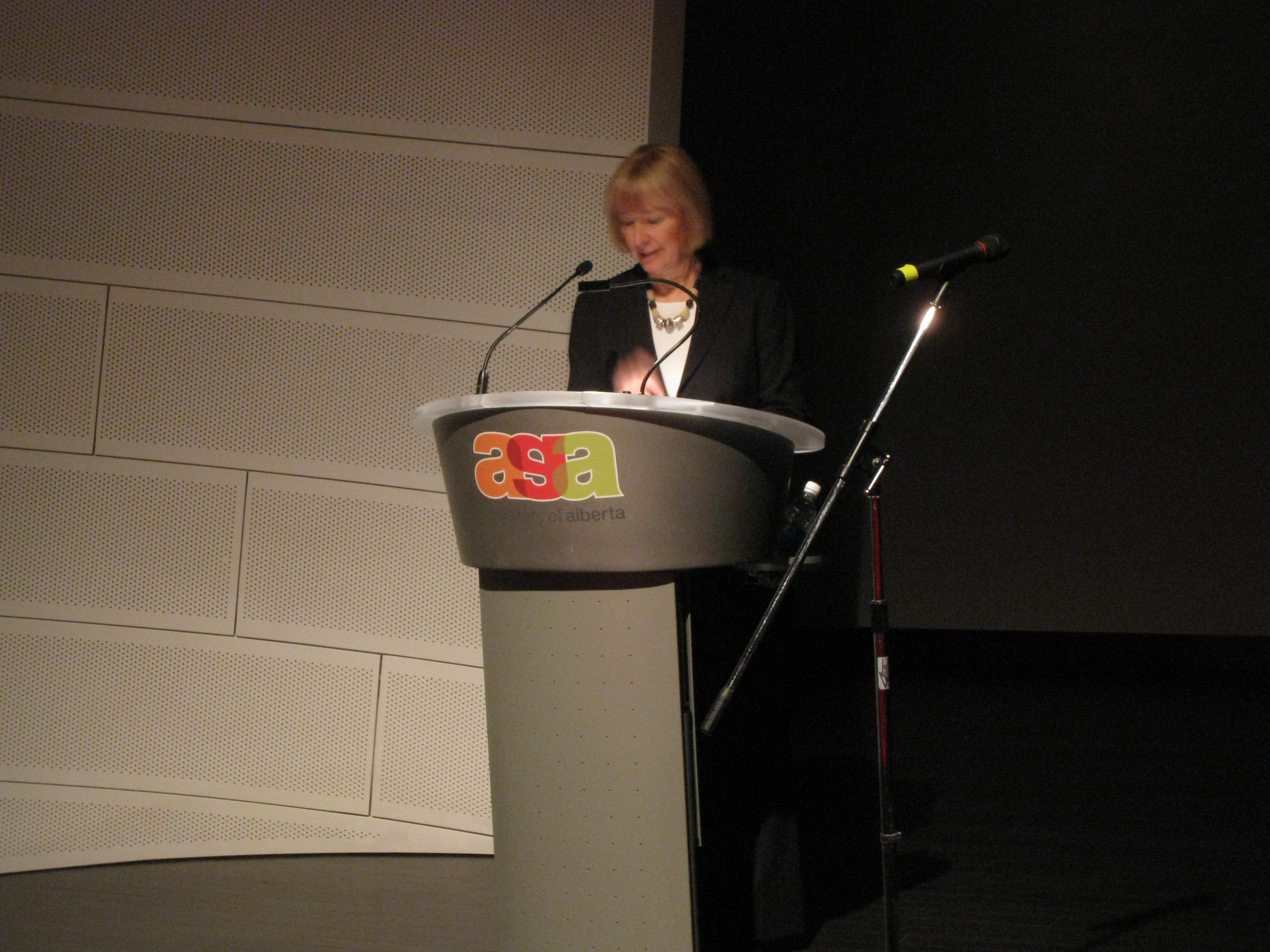

Chancellor of the University of Alberta
- In office 2008–2012
- Preceded by: John Thomas Ferguson
- Succeeded by: Ralph B. Young

Personal details
- Born: September 27, 1950 (age 76) Princeton, British Columbia, Canada
- Spouse: George Ward (1978)
- Education: University of Victoria
- Occupation: newspaper publisher

Linda Jean Hughes, AOE (born September 27, 1950) is a Canadian newspaper publisher. She served as Chancellor of the University of Alberta from 2008 to 2012. Hughes was educated at the University of Victoria (1972 Honours BA). She worked for the Edmonton Journal from 1976 to her retirement in 2006, eventually rising to the position of Publisher and President, the first woman in Canada to hold the position of publisher of a major newspaper. She serves on the board of Torstar. In 2016, she was appointed to the Alberta Order of Excellence.
