= Bob Layton (newscaster) =

Canadian newscaster

- Born: 1944 (age 81–82); Brentford, London, England
- Spouse: Marg Layton
- Presenting career
- Stations: 630 CHED (AM); CITV-DT (Global Edmonton)
- Style: Editorial
- Country: Canada

Robert West Layton (born 1944), known as Bob Layton, is an author and former Canadian newscaster and radio host in Edmonton, Alberta.

== Life ==
Layton was born in England during World War II. As an infant, Layton and his family spent a considerable amount of time in a trench in their garden during air raids. A short time later, the family moved to Canada and he was raised in Taber, Alberta. He worked for Canada Post in Calgary before beginning his broadcasting career in 1970. After attending the Columbia School of Broadcasting, he started his broadcasting career at CKNL in Fort St. John, British Columbia in 1970, but left one year later to work for 630 CHED in Edmonton, Alberta, where he eventually became news director of the Corus radio stations in Edmonton, including CHED, iNews 880, 925 Fresh FM and CISN Country in 1995. He was later invited to work at Global News, where his award-winning editorials are currently shown nationally.

Layton received a lifetime achievement award from the Radio-Television News Directors Association of Canada in 2010. He won another award for editorials in 2011.

Layton is also an active community member, involving himself in securing funding for a helicopter for the Edmonton Police Service. He received a centennial medal for his community service from premier Ralph Klein in 2005. He is married to Marg, with whom he has 6 children and 13 grandchildren.
