= Fil Fraser =

Canadian broadcaster and writer (1932–2017)

Felix Blache-Fraser (August 19, 1932 – December 3, 2017) was a Canadian broadcaster, writer, and film producer who was based in Alberta.

== Career ==
=== Broadcasting and journalism ===
Born in Montreal in 1932, Fraser began his career in broadcasting in 1951, when he was hired at the age of nineteen by Foster Hewitt for his radio station CKFH in Toronto. In 1952, he worked as a radio announcer in Timmins, Ontario, for six months before being hired as assistant news editor at CKBB radio in Barrie, where he became the station's sports director and commentator, calling games for the Barrie Flyers.

In 1955, Fraser moved back to Montreal, where he attended McGill University and hosted an all-night show at CKVL in Verdun, Quebec. In 1956, he worked as a news editor at CFCF radio, eventually becoming chief writer.

Fraser moved to Western Canada in 1958, and initially worked in public relations for Saskatchewan Government Insurance. He also remained involved in radio broadcasting, hosting hot stove league discussions on junior ice hockey broadcasts and sometimes commentating. In 1960, he founded a newspaper called the Regina Weekly Mirror.

He moved to Edmonton in 1965, where he became program manager and senior producer of the Metropolitan Edmonton Educational Television Association (MEETA), Canada's first educational television channel, which aired on CBXFT. Fraser subsequently became producer/host of Newsmakers, a weekly public affairs program on ITV Global Edmonton, and then served as president and CEO of VisionTV in Toronto.

In 1974, Fil moved to hosting a one-year run of an eponymous talk show on Charles Allard's newly-launched CITV private television station, and also began what would become a five-year stint as host of a talk show on CJCA-AM in Edmonton. In 1980 he moved to a talk show on CKXM-FM Edmonton, which had just changed its call-sign from CFRN to avoid confusion with the AM station that used the same call letters. This series ran for three years; in 1983 he became host of Alberta Morning, the daily program that ran on CKUA-AM, at the time operated by Access Alberta. In 1987, he became Director of Development for Access Alberta, in Edmonton.

Fraser served on the Alberta Task Force on Film and on the federal Task Force on Broadcasting Policy and was the governor of the Canadian Journalism Foundation as well as a member of the Canadian Association of Black Journalists.

=== Film ===
In the 1970s, Fraser formed a production company to produce educational television films. He later produced four feature films from 1977–82, including Why Shoot the Teacher?, Marie-Anne, The Hounds of Notre Dame, and Latitude 55°. He was a founding member of the Academy of Canadian Cinema & Television.

He organized the first Alberta Film Festival in 1974, which later became the Alberta Motion Picture Industry Association, and founded the Banff International Television Festival in 1979.

=== Writing ===
Fraser's published non-fiction works include Alberta's Camelot: Culture and the Arts in the Lougheed Years (2003), which looks at how programs by the government of former premier Peter Lougheed helped the provincial arts sector flourish from the early 1970s to the mid-1980s.

His 2006 book, Running Uphill: The Fast, Short Life of Canadian Champion Harry Jerome, looked at the pioneering Black Canadian track star Harry Jerome. In 2009, he completed the book How the Blacks Created Canada, part of a series of books from publisher Dragon Hill about how different cultural groups have contributed to the development of Canada.

=== Public service and academia ===
Fraser served as Chief Commissioner for the Alberta Human Rights Commission from 1989 to 1992 and served on the Spicer Commission.

A writer and educator in the field of alcoholism and addiction, he served as head of alcoholism prevention programs for both Alberta and Saskatchewan. He was an adjunct professor in State and Legal Studies at Athabasca University.

== Honours ==
Fraser was a Member of the Order of Canada and received the Alberta Achievement Award. In 2015, he was made a member of the Alberta Order of Excellence.

== Death ==
Fil Fraser died in Edmonton on December 3, 2017 of heart failure, aged 85. He was survived by his wife, Gladys Odegard, and his four children.

== Bibliography ==
- Alberta's Camelot: Culture and the Arts in the Lougheed Years. Lone Pine Publishing. 2003. ISBN 1-55105-393-4.
- Running Uphill: The Fast, Short Life of Canadian Champion Harry Jerome. Lone Pine Publishing/Dragon Hill Publishing. 2006. ISBN 978-1-896124-13-1.
- How the Blacks Created Canada. Lone Pine Publishing/Dragon Hill Publishing. 2010. ISBN 978-1-896124-43-8.
