= Alterna Bank =

Canadian direct bank

CS Alterna Bank
- Trade name: Alterna Bank
- Formerly: Civil Service Loan Corporation (1992—2000)
- Company type: Subsidiary
- Industry: Banking
- Founded: October 29, 1992; 32 years ago in Ottawa, Ontario, Canada
- Key people: Robert Paterson, President & CEO
- Total assets: CA$1,080,568,000 (2021)
- Parent: Alterna Savings
- Website: www.alternabank.ca

CS Alterna Bank (French: Banque CS Alterna), operating as Alterna Bank (French: Banque Alterna), is a Canadian direct bank and a wholly owned subsidiary of the Ontario-based credit union Alterna Savings. The bank offers chequing and high-interest savings accounts and mortgages.

Operating primarily as a direct bank since 2017, most customers access accounts using the bank's website, telephone service, and mobile apps. Unlike most other direct banks, some accounts can also be accessed through branches. There are four Alterna Bank ATM locations in Gatineau and some in Montréal (Note: Alterna Savings is provincially incorporated and does not directly offer its services outside Ontario. A federally regulated institution like Alterna Bank would not be similarly constrained. While federally incorporated credit unions exist, neither of the two Canadian institutions holding that status (UNI New Brunswick and Coast Capital Savings BC) currently operate outside their respective home province.) and Alterna Savings branches also administer deposits and loans on its behalf, to which the bank outsources most of its processes. Customers can make debit purchases using their access cards, write cheques, and make surcharge-free transactions at automated teller machines within The Exchange Network. Its flexibility has brought it attention from publications such as The Globe and Mail as a sound alternative to the Big Five banks.

The bank originated as the Civil Service Loan Corporation, founded 29 October 1992 and operating as CS Loan Corporation. It became CS Alterna Bank after receiving letters patent of continuation on 2 October 2000 as a federally regulated institution under the Bank Act. It continues to use the same institution number (#608). Its parent organization, the Civil Service Co-operative Credit Society, operated as CS CO-OP. The merger of CS CO-OP and Metro Credit Union in 2005 created Alterna Savings, adopting its subsidiary's name.

Alterna Bank is a member of Canada Deposit Insurance Corporation (CDIC).

== See also ==
- List of banks in Canada
- Motive Financial
- Simplii Financial
- Tangerine
