= Citizens' Forum on Canada's Future =

- Also known as: Spicer Commission
- Commissioners: Keith Spicer (Chair); Richard Cashin; Carole Corcoran; Fil Fraser; Thomas Kierans; Jim Matkin; Robert Normand; Raymond Sirois; Roger Tassé; Susan Van De Velde; Elsie Wayne; Helena Zukowski
- Inquiry period: November 1, 1990 – June 27, 1991
- Authorized: Order in Council P.C. 1990-2347

The Citizens' Forum on Canada's Future (French: Le Forum des citoyens sur l'avenir du Canada) was a commission established in November 1990 by Prime Minister Brian Mulroney. It was more commonly known as the Spicer Commission, after its chairman, Keith Spicer.

== Background ==
In the wake of the failure of the Meech Lake Accord, the federal government attempted to reach out to citizens by means of a public commission of inquiry. In response to a perception that the country's unity was being threatened by linguistic and regional divisions, the purpose of the Citizens' Forum on Canada's Future was to engage Canadians in a discussion about the political and social future of Canada. The Spicer Commission held town hall meetings across the country and solicited input from Canadians on the future of the country.

== Report ==
The commission's report was released in June 1991. The Commission noted that many Canadians were willing to recognize Quebec's cultural and linguistic differences but not to grant the province special powers that might weaken the central government; most respondents saw official bilingualism as divisive and costly; the education system and media had not done enough to promote national unity; Canadians regarded cutbacks to federal institutions as insensitive to national symbols; and many Canadians had a lack of faith in government leaders and the political process. Also notable was Spicer's comment that there was "a fury in the land" against Mulroney.

Some of the report's contents were subsequently used in the development of the Charlottetown Accord.

== Members ==
Richard Cashin - lawyer, trade union leader and federal MP

Carole Corcoran

Fil Fraser - broadcaster the public servant

Thomas E. Kierans - investment banker

Jim Matkin - senior federal civil servant

Robert Normand - Quebec civil servant, Deputy Minister of Intergovernmental Affairs

Raymond Sirois

Keith Spicer, Chairman

Roger Tassé - lawyer and civil servant

Susan Van De Velde

Elsie Wayne - NB municipal politician and later federal MP

Helena Zukowski
