= Pechet =

Pechet is a surname, likely of early French origin. Notable people with the surname include:

== Business and industry ==
- Eugene Pechet (1917–2008), Canadian hotel owner and banker
- Howard Pechet, hotel, casino, restaurant owner and theater producer

== Medicine and science ==
- Maurice Pechet (1918–2012), American scientist, Internal medicine physician, entrepreneur and philanthropist
- Taine Pechet, American thoracic surgeon

== Television and film ==
- Kim Pechet, writer and narrator for Shimmy (TV series)
