= Ed Mason =

Canadian newscaster (1946–2021)

- Born: July 1946
- Died: September 28, 2021 (aged 75)
- Presenting career
- Show: Morning news/police beat
- Stations: CHQT (1975–2005); 630 CHED, Edmonton, Alberta (2005–2014)
- Style: News
- Country: Canada

Ed Mason (July 1946 – September 28, 2021), nicknamed Uncle Eddie or Uncle Ed, was a Canadian newscaster who worked for 630 CHED in Edmonton, Alberta as a morning drive news and police beat presenter.

Mason began his radio career in 1963 with CFAR in Flin Flon, Manitoba, hosting Club 590, a teen show, where his father, Eric worked. From 1965 to 1975, Mason worked with radio stations all around Canada, in Manitoba, Saskatchewan, Ontario and British Columbia. He then moved to Edmonton, hosting the morning news and serving as news director on CHQT from February 3, 1975, until September 2005, when he moved to 630 CHED.

He celebrated his 35-year anniversary of being on Edmonton radio in February 2010. Mason was rushed to a hospital after suffering a heart attack on September 29, 2012, where stents were inserted into his heart to reduce an almost full blockage of his coronary artery. He returned to CHED on October 29, 2012.

In 2013, Mason was presented with a Lifetime Achievement Award from the Canadian Radio-Television News Directors Association.

"Uncle Ed" retired from radio on August 29, 2014.

He turned 75 in July 2021, after having worked at a number of top stations across Canada — in an era when radio was king. Mason died following surgery on September 28, 2021.
