= Tangerine Bank =

Canadian direct bank

- Trade name: Tangerine
- Formerly: ING Bank of Canada, operating as ING Direct (1997–2012)
- Type: Subsidiary
- Industry: Financial services
- Founded: 1997; 29 years ago
- Headquarters: 3389 Steeles Avenue East, Toronto, Ontario, Canada
- Key people: Terri-Lee Weeks (CEO)
- Number of employees: 1,267 (2025)
- Parent: Scotiabank
- Subsidiaries: Tangerine Investment Funds
- Website: www.tangerine.ca/en/personal

Tangerine Bank (operating as Tangerine) is a Canadian direct bank that is a subsidiary of Scotiabank. It offers no-fee chequing and savings accounts, guaranteed investment certificates (GICs), mortgages and mutual funds (through a subsidiary). Many savings and investment products are eligible for registration under a tax-free savings account (TFSA), registered retirement savings plan (RRSP) or registered retirement income fund (RRIF).

The bank was founded by ING Group in April 1997 as ING Bank of Canada (operating as ING Direct). In November 2012, it was acquired by Scotiabank. The new name for the bank was revealed in November 2013, and the Tangerine branding was rolled out beginning in April 2014.

Although now wholly owned by Scotiabank, Tangerine remains a separate legal entity and thus kept its unique Institution Number (614), with all accounts being under a single transit number (00152).

== History ==
Tangerine was originally founded in April 1997 as ING Group (using the trade name ING Direct) and operated as a telephone banking service offering savings accounts. It was the first test market for ING Group's direct banking business model, offering more favourable rates to customers by avoiding the costs of running a network of branches. Dutch actor Frederik de Groot served as the company's spokesperson in ING Direct Canada television commercials. Tangerine did business as ING Direct until it was acquired by Scotiabank in 2012.

In November 2012, Scotiabank completed the acquisition of ING Direct Canada from ING Group in a CAD$3.1 billion deal first announced in August 2012. On November 5, 2013, ING Direct Canada revealed that its name would be changed to Tangerine in early 2014. The bank stated that the name change was the culmination of a year-long consultation process involving more than 10,000 people in qualitative and quantitative research. Tangerine also continued to use the 'Forward Banking' tagline that had been used by ING Direct Canada.

As the bank expanded into online banking, it also grew to offer mortgages, RRSPs, TFSAs, GICs, mutual funds and no-fee chequing accounts. In November 2013, the company claimed to have over 1.8 million customers, employing almost 1,000 people and holding close to $40 billion in total assets.

On November 19, 2015, Tangerine was named by Waterstone Human Capital as one of Canada's 10 Most Admired Corporate Cultures of 2015.

In May 2023, Tangerine announced it had signed a five year sponsorship agreement with Bike Share Toronto.

== Products and services ==
Tangerine offers the same services that had been provided by ING Direct Canada, namely savings accounts, chequing accounts, mutual funds and mortgages. Tangerine's mutual funds (marketed as 'portfolios') are based on an indexing strategy, each tracking a weighted combination of three or four equity and/or bond indices.

In 2016, Tangerine began to offer a Mastercard cash-back credit card, which provides customers up to 2% cash back on certain purchases.

Tangerine's banking app is available to customers through iOS, Android, Blackberry and Windows Mobile. Support was also available for Wear OS and Apple Watch but was discontinued on February 29, 2020. The apps allows Tangerine customers to view their account balances and transactions, make transfers, find ABMs and deposit cheques by taking a picture.

As a result of the Scotiabank acquisition, Scotiabank ABMs and those of other banks in the Global ATM Alliance became free for Tangerine customers to use, starting in June 2014. As of September 28, 2014, Tangerine withdrew from The Exchange, its previous network of no-charge ABMs. Tangerine also operated a small number of branded ABMs until February 2020.

== Locations ==
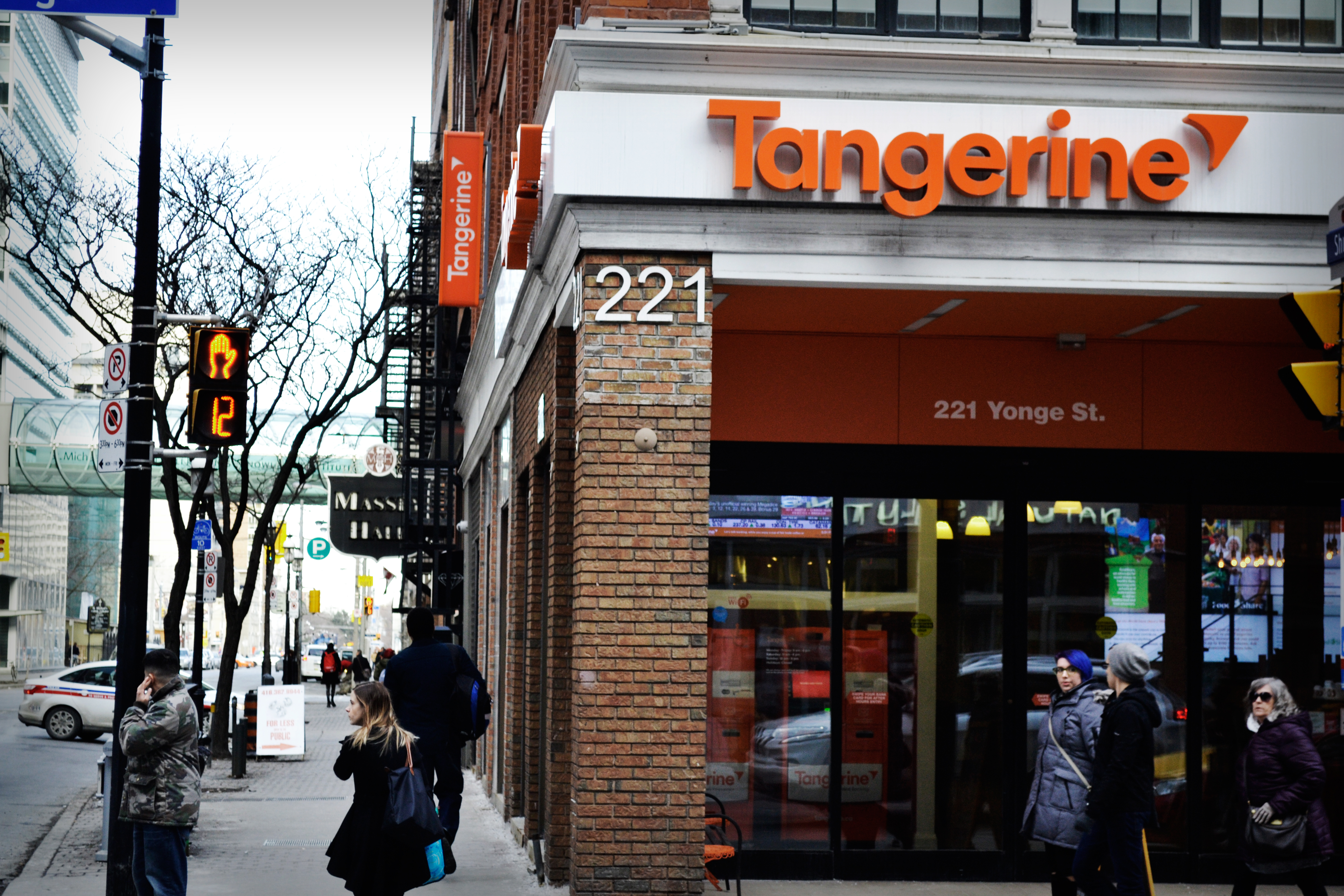
Former Tangerine Bank cafe on Yonge Street in downtown Toronto (permanently closed 2020)

Operating without traditional bank branches, ING Direct Canada instead opened a small network of ING Direct Cafes for its face-to-face contact points. The first café opened in Toronto in 1997, with a further three opening in Vancouver, Montreal and Calgary, as well a second Toronto location.

Under Scotiabank ownership, the bank continued to operate these cafés (rebranded under the Tangerine name). From time to time, the bank also opened temporary pop-up locations to help promote its products.

In its 2020 public accountability statement published in early 2021, Tangerine noted that all locations had been closed temporarily throughout the COVID-19 pandemic, and announced that it had subsequently decided to permanently close all of its cafés, except for the Toronto North café located in its head office. In its 2023 public accountability statement published in March 2024, the bank confirmed that the Toronto North café had also been permanently closed.

== See also ==
- List of banks in Canada
- Alterna Bank
- Alterna Savings
- Motive Financial
- Simplii Financial
