= Bill Matheson =

Canadian television meteorologist

Bill Matheson (April 26, 1926 – September 19, 2006) was a Canadian radio talk show host and weathercaster born in Lethbridge, Alberta, who was a television weather presenter with ITV (now Global Edmonton) in Edmonton. In 1995, his colleagues voted him the best weathercaster in the world.

== Early life ==
He joined the army at the age of 17 and fought in World War II as a paratrooper. After leaving the army a few years later, he received a job with the Transport Department's meteorological branch in 1948. Matheson worked in remote areas as a technician, sampling environmental data until 1954, when a friend told him of a new TV station being built in Lethbridge. He had a popular call-in show on radio called "Phone Bill" on CJOC in Lethbridge which had a huge local following.

He secured a position as the stations' weatherman, despite not owning a television himself. Nonetheless, he remained for almost 20 years. Then, in the 1970s, he was offered a job with ABC in New York. Matheson returned to Alberta after a little under 2 years; local unions failed to convince him to apply for U.S. Citizenship which he would need to continue his employment at ABC.

== Return to Canada ==
He returned to Alberta and joined Edmonton's CJCA radio station, where, partnered with Bill Jackson, he co-hosted the "Bill-and-Bill" show. Around the time he joined with CJCA, Bill Matheson also joined CITV-TV in Edmonton as its weatherman. Despite advances in technology, Matheson was known for sticking with his felt marker, his weatherboard, and a long pointer which he would bounce on the ground and catch at the end of every forecast. With his flowery language and expressive nature, he earned the "Best Weathercaster in the World" award in 1995.

As well as being a prominent personality at ITV, Matheson enjoyed strong listenership with CJCA and Bill Jackson until the station folded in 1993. At that time, he moved to 630 CHED for a solo show. He became known for his frequent attempts to retire (at least 3 separate times) as well as the format of his show, which allowed callers to call in for any particular reason. Matheson once said that his was the only show where people would call in about the numbers on the back of a pack of Chiclets.

Matheson retired from both radio and television in November 1999, and his final forecast on ITV was extravagant. Alongside the regular forecast, there was a quick speech from Matheson, a sendoff from Edmonton Police Pipe and Drum, as well as two fans who managed to sneak into the studio alongside staff and family. After his retirement, the studio retired Matheson's board, which was raised to the rafters.

Claire Martin often cites Matheson as one of the reasons she went into meteorology in the first place. Though she started off working for Environment Canada, Matheson convinced her to move into television. She became the evening and weekend forecaster in 1996, and upon Matheson's retirement, she became the permanent forecaster before moving to CBC Television in 2005.

== Speech ==
Matheson was well known for his poetic, almost Shakespearean language on air. He widely referred to "that most dreaded of all meteorological phenomena, the Siberian High" or its counterpart, the "Keep your eye on the Idaho High". Matheson was also known to say things such as "gather ye rosebuds, while ye may" to indicate a sudden cooling trend; while storm clouds were called the "darkling shadows on the weather map". These sat alongside "Mother Low", the "Omega Block" and numerous others.

Matheson mentioned the town of Baker Lake, Nunavut so often that he was eventually invited to visit the town, which he did.

Matheson's daily introduction to the Bill and Bill Show on CJCA: "We are broadcasting to you from the crystal gondola in the palatial main studios of 930 CJCA in beautiful downtown Edmonton for the education, elucidation, emancipation, enlightenment and mental emolument of the hoi-polloi."

== Death ==
Bill Matheson died of complications from Alzheimers and Parkinsons on September 19, 2006 in a nursing home at the age of 80. He was survived by two children, three stepchildren, four grandchildren and six step-grandchildren, one of which is Zachary Bruggeman, as well as his second wife.
