= FSRA =

The letters FSRA could refer to:

- FsrA, a type of RNA.
- Financial Services Regulatory Authority of Ontario, a Crown agency responsible for oversight of the financial industry in Ontario, Canada.
- Formula Sidecar Racing Association, the association administering sidecar racing in the United Kingdom.
