= Pace Savings & Credit Union =

Defunct Canadian credit union, closed by regulators

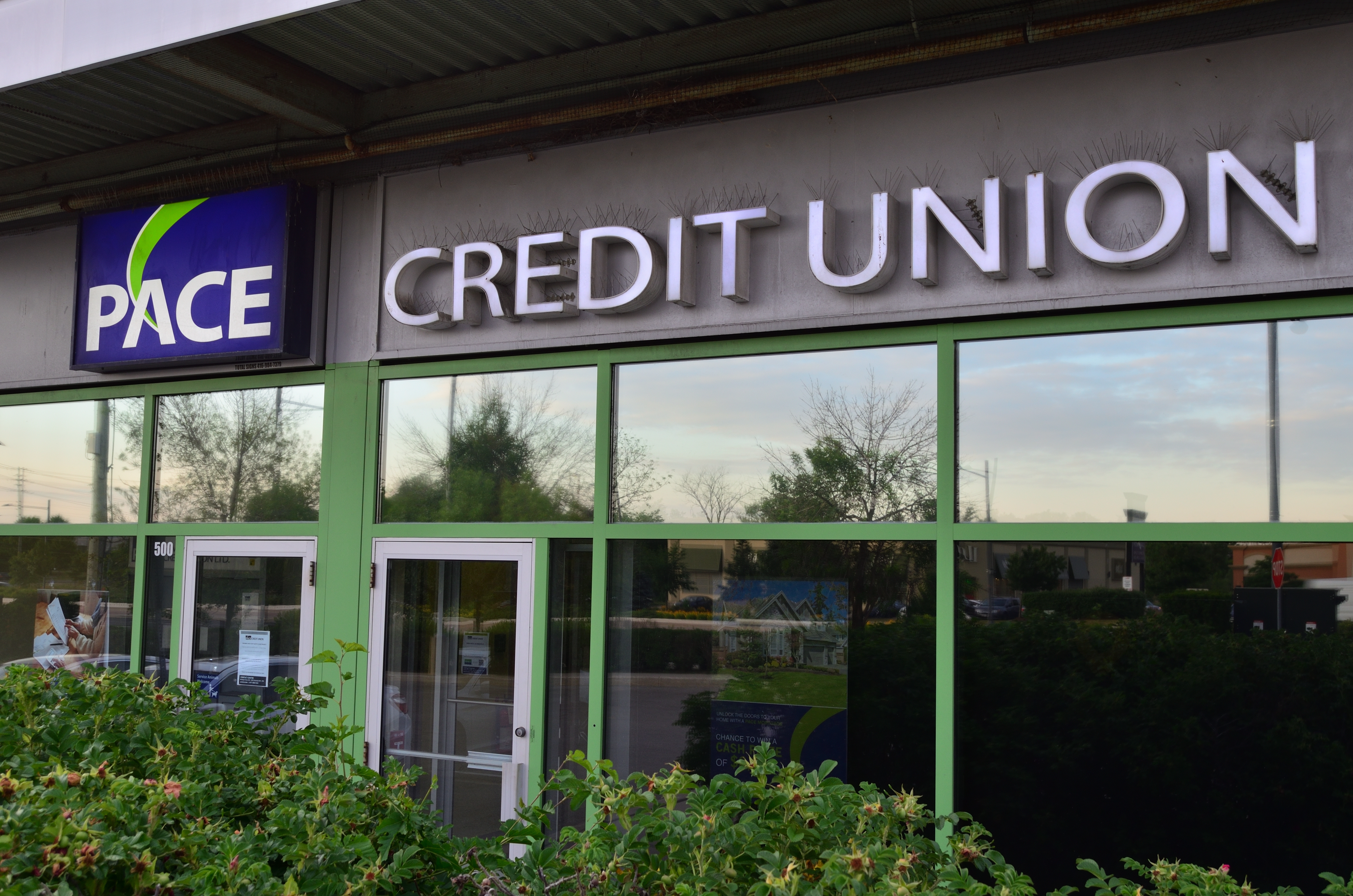
- Pace Savings & Credit Union in Markham
- Company type: Credit union
- Industry: Financial services
- Defunct: August 11, 2022
- Fate: Liquidation; operating assets absorbed into Alterna Savings in 2022
- Successor: Alterna Savings
- Headquarters: Vaughan, Ontario, Canada
- Products: Savings; chequing; consumer loans; mortgages
- Revenue: $34.5 million CAD (2019)
- Total assets: $1.1 billion CAD (2019)
- Subsidiaries: Pace Securities Corp.
- Website: www.pacecu.ca

PACE Savings & Credit Union Limited was a Canadian credit union based in Ontario. Pace grew through consolidation of several smaller credit unions in Ontario but the company was placed under administration by Financial Services Regulatory Authority of Ontario (FSRA) (previously the Deposit Insurance Corporation of Ontario) in September 2018 after the regulator found evidence of civil fraud, potential self-dealing by the CEO Larry Smith, and poor governance practices. After leaving administration in January 2020, the credit union went into administration again in November 2020 after the new CEO and several recently appointed directors resigned following the disclosure of additional regulatory problems at subsidiary Pace Securities Corp.

On 11 July 2022, the majority of assets and employees of PACE transferred to Alterna Savings following a purchase administered by the Financial Services Regulatory Authority of Ontario. KPMG is overseeing the liquidation of PACE's remaining non-operational assets and liabilities, including litigation against the former president and the CEO, and various insurance claims.

== History ==
Pace participated in the consolidation of the Ontario's credit unions by purchasing or merging with at least six other credit unions since 2000. In 2002, Greater Toronto Area (GTA) Savings and Credit Union merged with PACE. In April 2012, PACE purchased McMaster Savings and Credit Union Limited, which had two branches and $30 million in assets at the time of the transaction. Later in 2012, PACE announced that it would amalgamate with Peoples Credit Union of Innisfil and ETCU Financial Credit Union. The ECTU transaction closed on October 1, 2012, and the Peoples Credit Union transaction closed on 1 January 2013. At the time, Peoples had four branches and $150 million in assets. There was a failed deal in 2014 when a letter of intent regarding a merger with the much larger Alterna Savings was announced in April, but the merger was never completed. Additional deals were finalized in 2017 when PACE purchased Durham Educational Employees' Credit Union Limited and London Fire Fighters' Credit Union Limited. A deal to purchase City Savings & Credit Union Ltd. was announced on 24 July 2017, however, it was not completed and City Savings merged with Alterna Savings in 2019.

== Regulatory Investigations ==
=== Fraud and self-dealing allegations ===
A whistle-blower complaint in 2017 led to an investigation by Ontario's regulatory agency responsible for credit unions that resulted in the regulator putting Pace under administration due to concerns about possible fraud and weak controls at both the Board and management levels. In September 2018, the Deposit Insurance Corporation of Ontario (FSRA's predecessor agency) took the unusual step of assuming control of an institution that was not in financial distress. It was reported that the regulator found a "... culture of systematic self-dealing and secret commissions... [that] was facilitated by Board negligence, poor judgment and complicity". The chief executive officer, Phillip Smith, and his father, Larry Smith, in his role as president, were placed on administrative leave and then terminated by the regulator later in 2018, without severance. The regulator alleges that Larry Smith - who was CEO of Pace from 2002 to 2015, and Phillip Smith, who replaced his father as CEO in 2015, committed "civil fraud". As reported by The Globe and Mail: "An early estimate by the regulator put the potential damages suffered by the credit union at approximately $58-million. That included nearly $3.4-million in alleged secret payments to numbered companies owned by Larry Smith, and another $49-million relating to allegedly questionable loans that PACE may have to write down." Additionally, the regulator filed charges against Pace's board of directors for acting "negligently and in breach of their duty of care."

In January 2020, FSRA allowed Pace to emerge from administration after a member vote to appoint a new board of directors. A new senior management team was appointed between January and April 2020. After several directors resigned, FRSA placed Pace under administration once more on 20 November 2020.

=== Pace Securities Corp ===
In June 2020, a second regulatory investigation was disclosed regarding the sale of high risk investments by a subsidiary of Pace called Pace Securities Corp. The basis of the investigation was that, starting in 2018, Pace Securities Corp sold preferred shares in two subsidiaries of Pace Securities Corp. that reportedly lost 80-90% of their value in the first quarter of 2020. The self-regulatory organization responsible for Canadian securities dealers, the Investment Industry Regulatory Organization of Canada disclosed enforcement actions against the former CEO of Pace Securities Corp, Joseph Anthony Thomson, and the former chief compliance officer, Douglas Gerald McRae.

A few months after the Pace Securities Corp problems were publicized, the newly hired chairman of the board, the new CEO of Pace, and many of the remaining board members resigned. That led to FSRA taking over the management of Pace for the second time in just over two years.
