= Alterna Savings =

Canadian credit union

Alterna Savings and Credit Union Limited
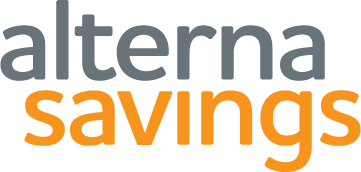
- Trade name: Alterna Savings
- Type: Credit Union
- Industry: Financial services
- Founded: September 3, 1908; 118 years ago (as the Civil Service Savings and Loan Society) in Ottawa, Ontario, Canada
- Key people: Rob Paterson, President & CEO
- Products: Savings; chequing; consumer loans; mortgages; credit cards; online banking
- AUM: C$10.8 billion (2023)
- Members: 217,000 (2023)
- Number of employees: 800
- Subsidiaries: Alterna Bank
- Website: www.alterna.ca

Alterna Savings and Credit Union Limited, commonly called Alterna Savings (French: Caisse Alterna), is a credit union based in Ottawa, Ontario, Canada. In addition to its credit union branches in Ontario, it also operates across Canada through its direct banking subsidiary Alterna Bank.

Established as the Civil Service Savings and Loan Society, it was the first Canadian approach to cooperative banking outside Quebec. Alterna Bank, launched in 2000, was one of Canada's first financial institutions to operate primarily through digital access. The parent organization adopted the Alterna name on merging with Toronto's Metro Credit Union in 2005. It is the second-largest credit union in Ontario, with C$10 billion in assets under management, over 217,000 members, and 41 branches.

== History ==
Alterna's major growth event was the 1 April 2005 merger between CS CO-OP and Metro Credit Union. The combined assets were $1.8 billion and the merger was described as the "first of its size to be approved in Ontario history". After merging with Metro, the parent organization adopted the Alterna name. Eight years later, Alterna began absorbing smaller credit unions with seven transactions between 2013, 2020, and 2022.

=== Civil Service Savings and Loan Society ===
The Civil Service Savings and Loan Society launched in 1908 with the assistance of Alphonse Desjardins. It was the first credit union in Canada outside Quebec. Federal civil servants were prompted by an article in their magazine The Civilian, when it reported on loan sharks charging civil servants up to 200% for payday loans. After the Government of Ontario passed a credit union law in 1928, the Ottawa-based institution was re-chartered as the Civil Service Co-operative Credit Society, which later operated as CS CO-OP.

=== Metro Credit Union ===
Metro Credit Union was incorporated 30 August 1949 as the University of Toronto Employees' Credit Union. It became the University and Colleges Credit Union in 1975, which later operated as Unicoll. Over the years it absorbed a variety of smaller credit unions, primarily ones that served universities, colleges or hospitals. It became a community bond credit union, open to all residents of Toronto, in 1994.

Gary H. Gillam, a leader of the credit union until his death in 1993, shaped Metro Credit Union's reputation as a pioneer in socially responsible investing. Alterna continues to operate a microcredit fund for disadvantaged Toronto entrepreneurs, and was one of the first financial institutions in Canada to perform regular social audits.

CS CO-OP and Metro were active participants in the negotiations of 12 credit unions across the country for a national co-operative bank in 1998. Though these negotiations were unsuccessful, they opened a door for CS CO-OP, under the leadership of Gary Seveny, to secure a bank charter for its subsidiary CS Loan Corporation, established as a Canada Deposit Insurance Corporation member in 1992. The new bank was launched as CS Alterna Bank in October 2000 to offer service across Canada.

=== Expansion ===
- Ottawa Women's Credit Union (October 2013) – The Ottawa Women's Credit Union formed in 1980 to provide financial products, services and training based on the philosophy of women helping women to become financially autonomous. The credit union was founded by Lynne Markell, Aline Akeson and Dorothy O'Connell after they recognized that the best way to help low income women in the Ottawa area was with a member-owned financial co-operative managed by and for women. The members voted to merge with Alterna Savings to form its Centretown branch in October 2013.
- Peterborough Community Savings (1 March 2016)
- Nexus Community Savings (1 December 2016)
- Toronto Municipal Employees' Credit Union (1 December 2018) – it remains a separate division operating as Toronto Municipal Employees' Savings (TME Savings).
- City Savings & Credit Union Ltd. (1 May 2019) – Toronto-based City Savings & Credit Union Ltd. was previously called North York Municipal Employees Credit Union and had two branches and $43 million in assets at the time of the merger.
- Quinte First Credit Union (1 June 2020)
- Member Savings Credit Union Ltd (2021) – a merger with the $119m Member Services was announced in Oct 2020 and closed in January 2021 .
- Pace Savings & Credit Union (July 2022) – Alterna absorbed the former PACE business in a purchase administered by the Financial Services Regulatory Authority of Ontario. There is a history between Alterna and PACE as there was a failed deal in 2014 when a letter of intent regarding a merger between the two credit unions was announced in April, but the merger was never completed.

Alterna was one of the first financial institutions to make loans to businesses focusing on cannabis in Canada following its legalization, providing primary banking services for approximately two-thirds of the hundred licenced growers in 2018.

== Memberships ==
- Central 1 Credit Union
- Interac
- The Exchange
- Cirrus Network
- Maestro (debit card)
- Financial Services Regulatory Authority of Ontario (deposit insurance)
- Co-op Network
