= Angus Watt =

Angus Watt may refer to:

- Angus Watt (financial advisor) (born 1952), Canadian financial advisor and commentator
- Angus Watt (general), Canadian retired air force general who was Chief of the Air Staff from 2007 to 2009
