= John E. Thompson block =

Coordinates: 43°39′15″N 79°22′46″W

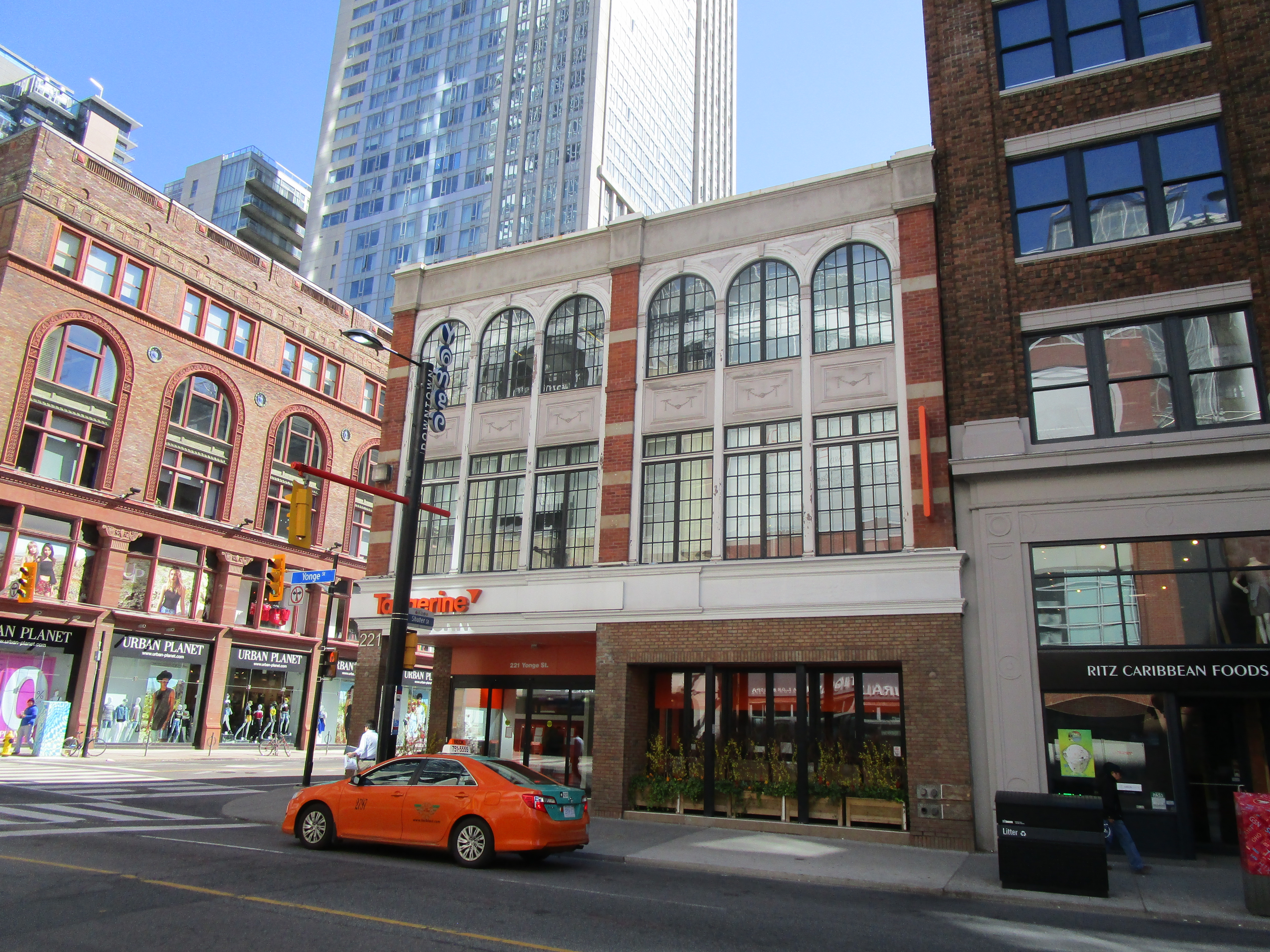
The John E. Thompson block, once the Rialto Theatre, is now a hi-tech access center.

The John E. Thompson block is a heritage structure at the corner of Yonge and Shuter streets in Toronto, Ontario, Canada. It was built in 1894, and renovated in 1904 and 1920. In 1900 it housed the Yonge Street Mission. According to Now Playing: Early Moviegoing and the Regulation of Fun, it was operating as a movie theatre, in the Griffin chain, in 1907.

In 2011 the teller-less bank Tangerine renovated the building, and opened it as an access centre. The third floor, closed to the public, housed a call centre, while the first two floors housed a WiFi centre, workspace and cafe for current and potential patrons. The Tangerine location has since closed and, as of September 2024, loan agency easyfinancial now operates in this space.
