= Eugene Pechet =

Canadian hotelier and banker

- Born: September 22, 1916; Romania
- Died: August 23, 2008 (aged 91)
- Occupation(s): Hotelier, banker, and businessperson
- Spouse: Rose Simkin
- Children: Howard Pechet

Eugene Pechet (September 22, 1916 – August 23, 2008) was a Canadian hotelier and banker. He bought his first hotel in 1942 and went on to build and operate 25 hotels throughout Western Canada and the United States.

== Early life ==
Eugene's grandfather Mayer Pechet was born on September 6, 1877 in Bucharest and married Marie Weisler (1886–1972) in 1902. The couple moved to Saskatchewan, Canada in the same year, opening a tinsmith shop in town, and would have a total of eleven children.

Eugene Pechet was born in Hirsch, Saskatchewan, on a Hirsch Jewish farming colony near Lipton, Saskatchewan. Following Depression-era economic hardships, the family moved to Edmonton in 1928. Eugene bought his first hotel, the Auditorium Hotel, in North Battleford in 1942.

== Career ==
=== Hotels ===
The Mayfield Inn in Edmonton was built by Stage West, Pechet's hotel business, in 1972. During its existence it was one of Edmonton's most famous hotels, and was especially notable for its 100 square metre Thai sala, a style of pagoda. The sala arrived in Edmonton for the 1987 K-Days exhibition, where it stood before the Kingdom of Thailand's trade exhibition. It took 12 Thai carpenters fifteen weeks to disassemble two old homes, harvest the seasoned teak, and re-assemble the sala in Edmonton - for a reported cost of $100,000. Due to high shipping costs, Pechet decided to buy the sala for $50,000, and installed it at the Mayfield Inn, covering a swimming pool to do so.

Following the sale of the Mayfield Inn to SilverBirch hotels in 2007, it was then sold to and redeveloped by DoubleTree Hilton. It reopened in 2014 after a $65 million construction phase, during which 200 employees of the hotel were laid off. Following a month-long closed-bid sale on Kijiji, the sala was re-bought by Eugene Pechet for around $12,000, and was transported to Vernon, British Columbia to be re-assembled on the beach outside Pechet's cottage on Okanagan Lake.

The Mayfield Dinner Theatre, a popular attraction at the hotel, continues to operate under the new hotel ownership.

== Banking industry ==
With Charles Allard, Pechet also founded the Canadian Western Bank, formerly the Bank of Alberta. They started the bank with three employees working out of an office located in one of Mr. Pechet’s hotels. As of 2010, the CWB has total balance sheet assets of just under $12 billion, assets under administration of over $8 billion and assets under management approaching $1 billion.
