= Keith Spicer =

Canadian public servant (1934–2023)

1st Commissioner of Official Languages
- In office April 1970 – June 1977
- Preceded by: Position Established
- Succeeded by: Max Yalden

Personal details
- Born: March 6, 1934 Toronto, Ontario, Canada
- Died: August 24, 2023 (aged 89) Ottawa, Ontario, Canada
- Education: University of Toronto, Sorbonne University
- Profession: Journalist, Professor, Senior civil servant

Keith Spicer (March 6, 1934 – August 24, 2023) was a Canadian academic, public servant, journalist, and writer. Between 1970 and 1977, Spicer was Canada's first Commissioner of Official Languages.

== Education ==
Spicer held a BA in Modern Languages (French and Spanish) from Victoria College, University of Toronto (1956); the Diplôme en relations internationales from l'Institut d'Études Politiques (SciencesPo), Paris (1958); and a PhD in Political Science (thesis: Canada's international aid and development program) from the University of Toronto (1961).

== Career ==
Appointed by Prime Minister Pierre Trudeau, he reported directly to Parliament as a nonpartisan officer of Parliament. As national "language ombudsman", his mandate was to uphold French and English language rights in all federal institutions under the 1969 Official Languages Act. (Previously, Canada's federal government operated predominantly in English.) He promoted the use of English and French as languages of both service and work, and he promoted the teaching of "French immersion" in English-language schools across Canada as a longterm support for an officially bilingual Canada.

During his tenure as commissioner, Spicer dealt with many tensions between English- and French-speaking Canada, notably a potentially nation-breaking 1976 crisis, when many English-Canadian pilots threatened to block the Montreal Olympics over the use of French in air traffic control. His approach was essentially diplomatic, but he used a mixture of threatened public denunciation and trademark humor to promote solutions.

From 1989 to 1996, Spicer was the chairman of the Canadian Radio-Television and Telecommunications Commission. During his tenure, he promoted Canadian TV programming, support for artists, respect for consumers, and telephone competition. He led a four-year campaign to reduce gratuitous TV violence aimed at children under 12.

In November 1990, in the midst of the national unity crisis caused by the collapse of the Meech Lake Accord several months earlier, he took an eight-month leave from his duties at the CRTC at the request of Prime Minister Brian Mulroney to chair the Citizen's Forum on National Unity, known colloquially as the "Spicer Commission". This controversial mass consultation was "a dialogue and discussion with and among Canadians... to discuss the values and characteristics fundamental to the well-being of Canada." The report, popularly referred to as the "Spicer Report", was published as a "Report to the People and Government of Canada" in June 1991.

At various points in his career, Spicer has taught at the University of Toronto, University of Ottawa, York University, UBC, Dartmouth College, UCLA and the Sorbonne, and has lectured widely on language rights, media in conflict zones, national broadcasting policy, and Canadian national unity. For the year 1963-1964, he was a special assistant to the federal minister of justice, Guy Favreau.

Before and between government jobs, Spicer worked as a broadcaster in both English and French. From 1966 to 1969, he wrote editorials and features for The Globe and Mail. He served as editor-in-chief of the Ottawa Citizen from 1985 to 1989. He was also a frequent host and commentator on CBC, Radio-Canada, TV Ontario and Radio-Québec.

From 1996 to 2000, Spicer worked for Ernst & Young Canada in Paris, promoting the Internet to a then-skeptical French establishment. He also taught an Internet seminar at the Sorbonne during that time.

From 2000 to 2007, Spicer was the founding director of the Institute for Media, Peace and Security at the UN-launched University for Peace in Costa Rica. There he created a curriculum and supervised development of key courses, including ones on the role of media before, during after conflict; media and genocide; media battlefield ethics; women journalists in war zones; and the roles of Israeli and Palestinian media in Middle East politics.

After 1996, he lived in Paris, where he continued writing newspaper columns and books.

Spicer died in Ottawa, Ontario, on August 24, 2023, at the age of 89.

== Publications ==
Spicer wrote eleven books:

- A Samaritan State? External Aid in Canada's Foreign Policy (1966)
- Cher Péquiste ... et néanmoins ami (1980)
- Winging It (1981)
- Think on Your Feet (1986)
- Life Sentences (2005)
- Paris Passions (2009)
- Sitting on Bayonets: America's Endless War on Terror and The Paths to Peace (2011)
- Murder by Champagne (2013)
- Bulles fatales (2014)
- Mouffetarderies (2016)
- Terror in the Cathedral (2018)
- Déchaînement (2019)

== Achievements and awards ==
Spicer was an Officer of the Order of Canada (O.C.) and held honorary doctorates from the University of Ottawa, Glendon College of York University, and Laurentian University.

== Archives ==
There is a Keith Spicer fonds at Library and Archives Canada.

== Notes ==
Government offices
Preceded by Office established	Commissioner of Official Languages; 1970–1977	Succeeded by Maxwell Yalden
Preceded by André Bureau	Chairman of the CRTC; 1989–1996	Succeeded by Françoise Bertrand
