= Roger Tassé =

Canadian lawyer and civil servant

Roger Tassé, OC (June 5, 1931 – May 20, 2017) was a Canadian lawyer and civil servant. Tassé served as a deputy solicitor general during the 1970s. He represented the Canadian government during negotiations which led to the Meech Lake Accord (1987) and the Charlottetown Accord (1992).

Beginning in 1980, Roger Tassé led a team of Department of Justice lawyers charged with drafting the Canadian Charter of Rights and Freedoms, which was adopted in 1982. His key role in the creation of the bill of rights, entrenched in the Constitution of Canada, earned him the nickname, "architect of the Canadian Charter of Rights and Freedoms."

Tassé died at a hospital in Gatineau, Quebec, on May 20, 2017, at the age of 85. He was survived by his wife, Renée Marcil Tassé.
