= Howard Pechet =

Canadian hotelier and producer

Howard E. Pechet
- Born: Canada
- Education: Washington State University, University of Alberta
- Occupations: Hotel owner Casino owner Restaurant owner Producer; Playwright
- Parent: Eugene Pechet (father)

Howard Pechet is a Canadian hotelier and producer. Pechet graduated from Washington State University with a Master of Arts degree. He is non-executive producer of Stage West and chairman of Stagewest Hospitality, which includes several hotels, dinner theatres and casinos. Pechet started Stage West in Edmonton, Alberta. He expanded this to Calgary and Winnipeg and then to the Toronto region, with the Mississauga theatre on Dixie Road, which opened in 1986. The first show in Mississauga was a small-scale comedy, Social Security by Andrew Bergman. Pechet has produced almost 1,000 plays and has co-written 14 musical revues.

== Awards and achievements ==
Pechet has produced almost 1,000 plays and has co-written 14 musical revues, setting the Guinness World Record for producing the most theatre productions.

== Other ==
Pechet is a director of several corporations, including the Canadian Western Bank, which the Pechet family began in 1984.

== Personal life ==
Pechet is married and lives in Rancho Mirage, California.
