= Angus Watt (financial advisor) =

Canadian financial advisor and commentator

Angus Watt AOE
- Born: James Angus Reid Watt; May 4, 1952 (age 74); Elmira, Ontario, Canada
- Education: York University (BA)
- Occupations: financial advisor; stockbroker; financial commentator
- Employer: National Bank Financial
- Spouse: Heather Rea (m. 1976)

James Angus Reid Watt (born May 4, 1952) is a Canadian financial advisor, stockbroker, and financial commentator who is the managing director of individual investor services at National Bank Financial and the founder of the Angus Watt Advisory Group. He is known for his daily financial reports on Global Edmonton and CHED AM.

== Early life and education ==
James Angus Reid Watt was born on May 4, 1952, in Elmira, Ontario, to Charlotte and Owen Watt. He was named after his grandfathers, Angus Reid and James Watt. His father Owen was a Spitfire pilot in the Royal Air Force and Royal Canadian Air Force, serving during the liberation of the Netherlands in World War II.

At the age of five, Watt moved with his family to Toronto, where he worked various jobs while in school, including at a marina when he was 10 years old for six days a week. He graduated from Lawrence Park Collegiate Institute in 1972. Growing up wanting to become a lawyer, Watt attended law classes at York University until he changed his mind in his fourth year, later saying he did not want to "argue that black was white and white was black...for the rest of my life". Shortly after graduating from York with a Bachelor of Arts in Political Science in 1974, Watt attended a training program for investment advisors at McLeod Young Weir in Toronto; he did so mainly because the father of a friend of his girlfriend worked there but ended up joining the company.

== Career ==
Watt worked as an advisor for a year in Toronto before being transferred to Edmonton in 1976 to develop his own practice; among his first clients was the local entrepreneur Charles Allard. In November 1982, Watt joined the brokerage firm Levesque Beaubien, which was later acquired by National Bank of Canada in 1988. That same year, as Levesque Beaubien's Edmonton manager, Watt testified at the Code inquiry into the collapse of Principal Group; he denied his company had broken any regulations after a report criticized its involvement in brokering share transfers between Principal and an affiliate firm, which were later found to be for the purposes of insider trading and market manipulation. By 1990, he had become the vice-president of Levesque Beaubien, and was one of the investment dealers that assisted with the privatization of Alberta Government Telephones under its holding company Telus Corporation.

=== Angus Watt Advisory Group ===
Logo of the Angus Watt Advisory Group

In 1999, Watt founded the Angus Watt Team with Jane Alm and Jan Frederickson, who later acquired ownership stakes in the business. The team launched its group insurance division in 2002, and changed its name to the Angus Watt Advisory Group in the late 2000s to emphasize its partners' stake in the business.

Since the 1970s, Watt has provided financial and business reports on radio and television, including reports on CHED AM and Global Edmonton. His son Jim Watt and Jane Alm also provide reports as members of the group's business anchor team.

== Philanthropic work ==
Watt has supported various causes related to mental health in honour of his brother Ian, who died by suicide in 1977. In 1992, he began working with the Personal Development Centre (PDC), which he helped merge into The Support Network, an agency offering a variety of mental health services. After the merger in 1995, he created the PDC Foundation to help the group secure sustainable funding, and served as its chair for 10 years.

In 1996 and 1997, Watt was the campaign chair for the United Way in Edmonton; he returned the latter year after the resignation of former EPCOR president and CEO David Foy two days before its fundraising drive began.

Watt served two consecutive terms as an honorary consul to the Kingdom of the Netherlands, retiring in 2019. Beginning in 2011, he also served as an honorary lieutenant-colonel with the South Alberta Light Horse (SALH) regiment, which helped liberate the Netherlands during World War II. In 2012, he visited the Netherlands to meet Queen Beatrix and her sister Princess Margriet as honorary consul. He then visited Buckingham Palace to meet Sophie, Countess of Wessex, the colonel-in-chief of the SALH. After his retirement with the rank of honorary colonel in 2019, Watt was elected vice-president of the South Alberta Light Horse Regimental Association, and as of 2023, serves as its chair.

== Personal life ==
In 1976, Watt met Heather Rea at a meeting three days after arriving in Edmonton, where she was training to become a financial advisor at Merrill Lynch; they married after his transfer to Edmonton that year. Their two children, Kate and Jim, were born in the mid-1980s. After her mother was diagnosed with breast cancer for a second time in 2005, Kate staged an equestrian event at Northlands Park to raise money for cancer research. Jim played as a goaltender in the Western Hockey League before graduating with a business degree and working for the Angus Watt Advisory Group as an investment advisor. He became a partner at the group in 2016.

== Awards and honours ==
| Ribbon | Description | Notes |
|---|---|---|
| | Member of the Alberta Order of Excellence | Awarded in 2023 |
| | Queen Elizabeth II Diamond Jubilee Medal for Canada | Awarded in 2012 |
| | Queen Elizabeth II Platinum Jubilee Medal | Awarded in 2022; Alberta version |
