= Paul C. Weiler =

Canadian and American legal scholar (1939–2021)

Paul C. Weiler OC (28 January 1939 – 7 July 2021) was the Henry J. Friendly Professor of Law, at Harvard Law School and a widely published expert in labour law, sports law and tort. In 2016, he was appointed an Officer of the Order of Canada.

== Career ==
Weiler was born in Thunder Bay, Ontario. He completed a bachelor and master of Arts at the University of Toronto in 1960 and 1961, before completing an LL.B. at Osgoode Hall Law School in 1964 and an LL.M. at Harvard Law School in 1965. In 1973 he was a professor of law at Osgoode Hall Law School, called upon by the British Columbia government to assist in drafting legislation which brought their Labour Relations Board into existence. Then, he "was chairman of the British Columbia Labour Relations Board from 1973 to 1978." He subsequently became the MacKenzie King Visiting Professor of Canadian Studies, Harvard University in 1978 and the Henry J. Friendly Professor of Law from 1993, until taking an Emeritus position in 2008.

== Non obstante clause ==
Weiler had an influence on the formation of the 1982 Canadian constitution. An article Weiler wrote in 1980 for the Dalhousie Law Journal recommended inserting a non obstante (or notwithstanding) clause in the Canadian Charter of Rights and Freedoms. This would allow an individual province to pass a law in violation of some charter provisions. This concept was shared with Jim Matkin, British Columbia deputy minister of inter governmental affairs, who shared this with other provinces in a no-author text during interprovincial negotiations toward constitutional change in Canada. During the Kitchen Accord this concept reappeared and became one of the compromises that led to a patriated Canadian constitution.

== Publications ==
Articles

- 'Promises To Keep: Securing Workers' Rights to Self-Organization Under the NLRA' (1983) 96(8) Harvard Law Review 1770

Books

- Entertainment, Media and the Law (West 3rd ed. 2006)
- Sports and the Law (West 3rd ed. 2004) (with G Roberts)
- Leveling the Playing Field: How the Law Can Make Sports Better for Fans (Harvard University Press 2000)
- "Reconcilable Differences: New Directions in Canadian Labour Law" (Carswell 1980)

== See also ==
- US labor law
- US tort law
- Canadian labour law
