= Kathy Tomlinson =

Kathy Tomlinson is a Canadian reporter and investigative journalist.

== Career ==
Tomlinson started her broadcast journalism career at CITV-DT in Edmonton, where she was the Alberta Legislative reporter for both the Edmonton and Calgary stations. During her time as a reporter with the Canadian Broadcasting Corporation, she won the 2013 Canadian Association of Journalists award for Labour reporting for the story about RBC foreign workers. In 2015 she joined the staff of The Globe and Mail.
