= Bank of Alberta =

Former bank based in Canada

- Founded: 1984
- Founder: Charles Allard; Eugene Pechet
- Defunct: 1988
- Fate: Merged with Western & Pacific Bank
- Successor: Canadian Western Bank
- Headquarters: Edmonton, Alberta, Canada

The Bank of Alberta was a bank based in Edmonton, Alberta, Canada from 1984 to 1988. It was formed during the early 1980s recession in Canada, a challenging economic environment that pushed many competitors to rein in their activities in key western markets. As a result, the bank ultimately had a significant impact on the evolution of modern banking in Western Canada.

== History ==
When the bank commenced operations in 1984 it was led by Canadian Business Hall of Fame member Dr. Charles Allard and Eugene Pechet, starting with three employees working out of a boardroom located in one of Pechet's hotels in Edmonton, Alberta. The Government of Alberta supported the newly formed Bank of Alberta by investing in 5% of its shares.

In 1988, the Bank of Alberta merged with Western & Pacific Bank to form Canadian Western Bank (CWB).

== See also ==
- List of banks in Canada
