= Charles Allard =

Canadian broadcaster, surgeon (1919–1991)

Dr. Charles Allard
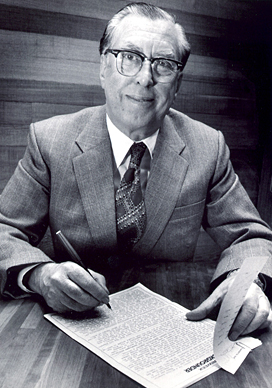
- Born: November 19, 1919; Edmonton, Alberta, Canada
- Died: August 11, 1991 (aged 71); Edmonton, Alberta, Canada
- Occupations: Banker, broadcaster, businessman, surgeon
- Known for: Founding Alberta Gas and Chemicals, Bank of Alberta, Edmonton Oilers, Allarcom
- Honours: Canadian Association of Broadcasters Hall of Fame (1996)

Charles Alexander Allard (November 19, 1919 – August 11, 1991) was a Canadian banker, broadcaster, businessman, and surgeon who set up the Canadian radio station CHQT, Edmonton's independent television station CITV-TV, the Bank of Alberta, Allarcom, and the Edmonton Oilers. He was a fellow of the Royal College of Surgeons of Canada, chief of staff at the Edmonton General Hospital, and posthumously inducted in the Canadian Association of Broadcasters Hall of Fame in 1996.

== Life and death ==
Charles Allard was born and raised in Edmonton, Alberta, in 1919. He received his medical degree from the University of Alberta in 1943 and complete his postgraduate studies in surgery at the Montreal General Hospital, Boston Lahey Clinic, Montreal Royal Victoria Hospital; and Montreal Children's Hospital. He was appointed the chief of staff of the Edmonton General Hospital.

Allard died in Edmonton in 1991, at the age of 71.

== Business career ==
In 1965, Allard founded the Edmonton radio station CHQT, and in 1975 founded western Canada's first independent TV station, CITV. He co-founded Paris Investments, which was later renamed Allarco Developments and became one of the largest real-estate companies in Canada. He was the founder, board chair, and director of Alberta Gas and Chemicals and International Jet Air. He was one of the founders of Bank of Alberta, which went on to become the Canadian Western Bank. He consolidated his media interests into Allarcom, which was sold to Western International Communications in 1991.

In 1971, he founded the hockey team the Edmonton Oilers, then a participant in the World Hockey Association.

== Honours ==
- Canadian Business Hall of Fame (inducted 1995)
- Canadian Association of Broadcasters Broadcast Hall of Fame (inducted 1996)
