= CHQT =

Canadian radio station (1965–2024)

- Final logo from 2018 to 2024
- Edmonton, Alberta; Canada
- Broadcast area: Edmonton Metropolitan Region
- Frequency: 880 kHz

Programming
- Format: All-news radio
- Affiliations: Global News

Ownership
- Owner: Corus Entertainment; (Corus Radio Company)
- Sister stations: CHED, CISN-FM, CKNG-FM, CITV-DT

History
- First air date: August 19, 1965
- Last air date: October 9, 2024
- Former frequencies: 1110 kHz (1965–1986)
- Call sign meaning: "Canada's Highest Quality Talk"

Technical information
- Class: B
- Power: 50,000 watts
- Transmitter coordinates: 53°22′7″N 113°19′5″W

CHQT was an AM radio station in Edmonton, Alberta. Owned by Corus Entertainment, the station first launched in August 1965. In June 2008, after having broadcast various music-based formats, CHQT flipped to an all-news format as a counterpart to sister news/talk station CHED.

In June 2024, CHQT was closed by owner Corus Entertainment as a part of company-wide cuts, and began to simulcast CHED for a transitional period. CHED's programming and call letters were permanently moved to CHQT's signal on October 9, 2024, with Corus citing its better coverage (while they both broadcast at the same power, CHQT was non-directional in the daytime unlike CHED, which used a directional antenna at all times).

== History ==
The station signed on August 19, 1965 on 1110 kHz, with 10,000 watts power. It originally broadcast a Middle of the road format. In 1979, CHQT started using 50,000 watts power. In 1986, the station changed frequency to 880 kHz as it was sold to Monarch Broadcasting, Ltd.

In July 2000, Shaw Broadcasting sold the station to Corus Entertainment. In June 2001, CHQT flipped to oldies as Cool 880. In October 2003, the station briefly flipped to a variety hits format as 880 Joe AM. The format moved to sister station CKNG-FM as 92.5 Joe FM on January 13, 2004, after which CHQT reverted to oldies; it is likely CHQT flipped to the format merely as a placeholder while CKNG prepared for their flip to avoid a rival company preemptively making any similar move.

On May 20, 2008, CHQT re-launched as an all-news station, branded as iNews 880, complementing sister talk radio station CHED. On May 29, 2018, the station re-branded as Global News Radio 880 Edmonton, as part of an ongoing rebranding of Corus's news/talk radio stations to create synergies with Global News television programming. As part of the rebranding, the station added an audio simulcast of Global Edmonton's Global News Hour at 6. An audio simulcast of Global News at Noon was added as of March 2019. As of July 2020, an audio-only rebroadcast of Global National aired on CHQT at 7 p.m., following the News Hour simulcast.

On June 26, 2024, as part of cuts by Corus, CHQT discontinued its all-news format and began simulcasting with CHED. At the time, Corus stated that the simulcast was an interim measure, and that it would ultimately only operate one news-talk AM station in Edmonton. In August 2024, Corus announced that CHQT would close, and that CHED's branding and programming would move permanently to the 880 signal on October 9, 2024. Corus stated that CHQT's signal had better coverage than that of CHED; while both stations operated at a power of 50 kilowatts, the 880 AM transmitter is non-directional during the day whereas 630 was directional at all times. The 630 AM license was formally revoked by the CRTC on January 17, 2025, and its transmitter site will be sold.
