= Jim Matkin =

Canadian lawyer and businessman (born 1942)

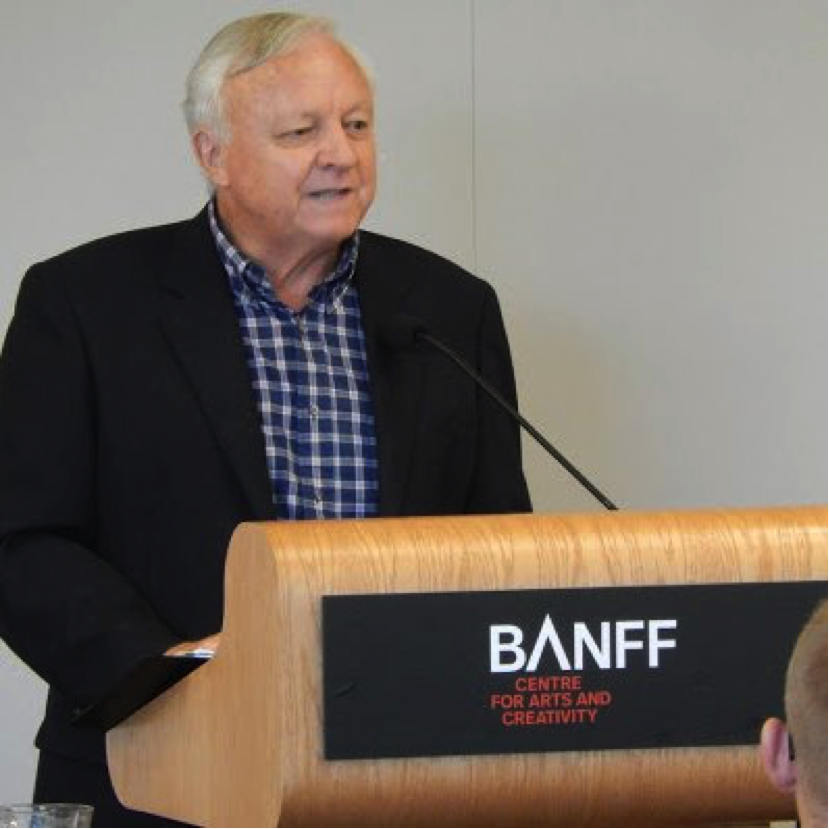
- Occupations: former: Law professor, deputy minister, president & CEO of Business Council of BC, former executive director of Law Society of BC
- Spouse: Cheri
- Children: Three daughters

James G. Matkin, QC (born 1942) is a former British Columbia, Canada deputy minister of labour and of intergovernmental relations, former president and CEO of the Business Council of British Columbia, and a former British Columbia Law Society secretary and executive director. He led drafting of the Labour Code Of B.C. in 1973, and legislation for the first human rights code of BC, and floated the non obstante clause compromise that was adopted in the Canadian Constitution and Charter of Rights in 1981. He is credited with "cleaning up" the Vancouver stock exchange through his one-man commission of enquiry. He studied law and economics at Harvard, where as a Frank Knox Fellow he graduated with an LL.M. in 1969. He is a self-proclaimed "most viewed writer" in climatology and carbon emissions in Quora. He is one of the editors of Academia.edu, and actively posts about negotiation and climate.

== Early life ==
Matkin is originally from Alberta. He obtained his bachelor's and master's (law) degrees from University of Alberta and a Master of Laws from Harvard Law School. He became a law clerk in 1970 to Supreme Court of Canada Justice, Ronald Martland and an assistant professor of law at the University of British Columbia.

== Career ==
While a University of British Columbia law faculty member, Matkin was invited to be part of a government-appointed Committee of Special Advisors assembled to draft legislation which became the Labour Code of British Columbia Act of 1973.

At age 30, he became deputy minister of labor in British Columbia. He was then the youngest deputy minister in the history of BC. From 1981, he was deputy minister of intergovernmental relations. He left the bureaucracy on July 1, 1983, with the congratulations of Honorable Garde Gardom: " Mr. Matkin has performed long and in a most dedicated fashion, under two different administrations, always in the interests of the general public of our province. He's been a dedicated public servant."

=== Non obstante clause ===
Matkin's associate, Paul C. Weiler, a former BC Labour Relations Board head, had written a McGill Law Journal paper that recommended a non obstante clause be inserted in the Canadian constitution. This would allow a Canadian province to "opt out" of portions of the new constitution. Matkin's staff altered a "no author text" to include this concept. The "no author text" (or a document with no author named) was circulated at a constitutional conference attended by Canadian first ministers and their staff. This clause bears close resemblance to the notwithstanding clause that ultimately became an ingredient in the Kitchen Accord among most Canadian provinces and the federal government of Canada.

=== Later career ===
From 1983 to 1993, Matkin served as president and CEO of the B.C. Business Council. He was also a director of the Bank of Canada, serving from 1992 to 1995. In 1996, Matkin was chosen to head a commission to oversee the reduction in size of the British Columbia fishing fleet.

Matkin was a committee of one who investigated and in 2004 "denounced" the Vancouver Stock Exchange "as a breeding ground for swindles", and laid the blame at the feet of the B.C. Securities Commission.

"...[H]is report served as an official wake-up call. The exchange began blackballing miscreant promoters, then merged with the Alberta Stock Exchange to form the Canadian Venture Exchange, and was later acquired by the more respectable Toronto Stock Exchange, resulting in the TSX Venture Exchange."

=== Resignation from BC Law Society ===
Matkin was the executive director of the BC Law Society from 1998 to 2004. On December 6, 2004, he resigned. This was in response to concerns raised at the society that he had become involved with a junior company with two alleged stock offenders. "Matkin denied any improper conduct. He argued that [alleged offenders] Gujral and Alexander had learned from their mistakes and deserved a second chance. He also said he sought and obtained assurances that Alexander would not promote the company's shares, only the technology." "There has never been any suggestion that Matkin did anything illegal. The issue is simply whether it was appropriate for him to be dealing with a company associated with Gujral and Alexander."

The then-president of the Canadian Bar Association, British Columbia branch, expressed regret that an enquiry did not occur due to Matkin's resignation. "I dare say it would have assisted all to know whether the Executive Director, given the leadership role inherent in this position, is expected to meet an elevated ethical standard, and if so, what that standard entails .... [T]his [resignation] represents the loss of an important opportunity for the Benchers to articulate, for the profession generally and for the previous and next incumbent, the standards expected of the individual appointed to this key position in the organization."

The BC Law Society dismissed a complaint of impropriety filed by a lawyer on December 31, 2004.

=== Scholarship and policy writing ===
Matkin's publications span constitutional law, labour relations, administrative law, international trade, economic policy, and public affairs.

== Legacy ==
Matkin's legacy includes the BC Labour Relations board and legislation, changes to the Vancouver Stock Exchange, and the first human rights code in BC.

In later life, Matkin has turned to producing self-published opinion pieces on climatology via Academia.edu, articulating his position of climate change denial, his belief in the global warming conspiracy theory, and criticizing political and economic reforms aimed at avoiding or mitigating anthropogenic climate change, which he attributes to the political left. These articles consist mainly of articles written by other climate change deniers and republished with additional commentary by Matkin.

== Publications ==
- James G. Matkin, "Why the Notwithstanding Clause Saved the Charter", Litigating the Values of a Nation: The Canadian Charter of Rights and Freedoms, Weiler and Elliot, Carsell 1986/
- James G. Matkin, Principled Bargaining (softcover, Industrial Relations Centre, Queen's University at Kingston), ISBN 0888861281 (0-88886-128-1)
- James G. Matkin, D. Geoffrey Cowper, Restructuring for the Future: Towards a Fairer Venture Market the Report of the Vancouver Stock Exchange & Securities Regulation Commission
- James G. Matkin, "Government Intervention in Labour Disputes in British Columbia." (1975)
- James G. Matkin, Clive Cocking, "A weak federal government getting weaker"
- James G. Matkin, "The Future of Industrial Relations in Canada", Canadian Public Policy / Analyse de Politique Vol. 12, Feb., 1986
- James Matkin, book review, "The Great Theft: Wrestling Islam From the Extremists," by Abou El Fadl
