= Meech Lake Accord =

Proposed amendments to the Constitution of Canada

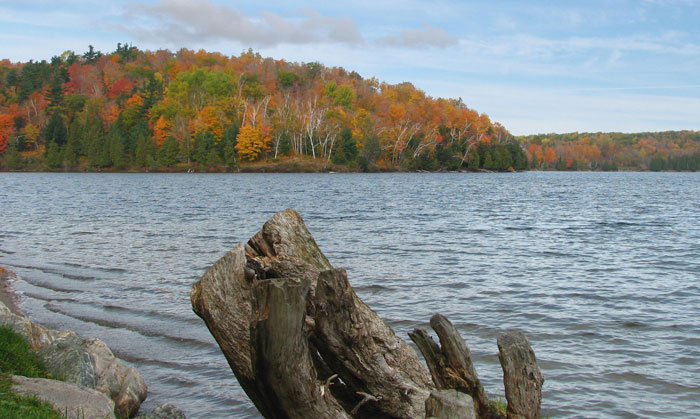
Meech Lake

The Meech Lake Accord (French: Accord du lac Meech) was a series of proposed amendments to the Constitution of Canada negotiated in 1987 by Prime Minister Brian Mulroney and all 10 Canadian provincial premiers. It was intended to persuade the government of Quebec to symbolically endorse the 1982 constitutional amendments by providing for some decentralization of the Canadian federation.

The proposed amendments were initially popular and backed by nearly all political leaders. However, former Prime Minister Pierre Trudeau, feminist activists, and Indigenous groups raised concerns about the lack of citizen involvement in the Accord's drafting and its future effects on Canadian federalism, and support for the Accord began to decline. Changes in government in New Brunswick, Manitoba, and Newfoundland brought ministries to power that declined to accept the Accord. Further negotiations were conducted but tension increased between Quebec and the predominantly English-speaking provinces. A dramatic final meeting among first ministers a month before the Accord's constitutionally-mandated ratification deadline seemed to show renewed agreement on a second series of amendments that would address the concerns raised in the intervening debates. Despite this, the original accord would not gain acceptance in the Manitoba or Newfoundland legislatures in time for ratification.

Failure to pass the Accord greatly increased tensions between Quebec and the remainder of the country. The Quebec sovereignty movement gained renewed support for a time. The general aims of the Accord would be addressed in the Charlottetown Accord, which failed to gain a majority vote in a referendum.

== Prelude ==
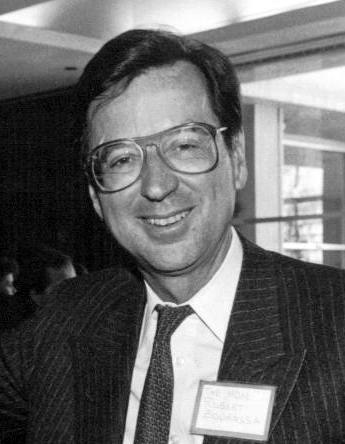
Robert Bourassa, Premier of Quebec

In 1981, negotiations between the federal and provincial governments to patriate the constitution, led by Prime Minister Pierre Trudeau, resulted in an agreement that formed the basis of the Constitution Act, 1982. Quebec Premier René Lévesque and the Quebec National Assembly refused to approve the amendments and announced it would use a constitutional veto. The Supreme Court of Canada ruled in the Quebec Veto Reference that Quebec did not have a veto, and the Constitution Act, 1982 was operative in Quebec.

In the 1984 federal election, the Progressive Conservatives, led by Brian Mulroney, committed to eventually allowing the National Assembly to accept the amendments "with honour and enthusiasm," won a majority government. The apparent lessening of tension prompted Lévesque to attempt the "beau risque" of federal cooperation. His government split, leading to his resignation and the ultimate defeat of his sovereigntist Parti Québécois by the federalist Quebec Liberal Party of Robert Bourassa in the 1985 provincial election.

In his election platform, Bourassa outlined five conditions that would have to be met for Quebec to "sign on" to the constitution. They were recognition of Quebec's distinct character (as primarily Catholic and French-speaking), a veto for Quebec in constitutional matters, input from Quebec into the appointment of Supreme Court justices, co-determination of the number and selection of immigrants arriving in Quebec, and a limit on the federal spending power. Bourassa considered the demands practical, as all elements of the conditions had previously been offered by the federal government to Quebec on different occasions.

Bourassa and Mulroney, both pragmatic pro-business figures, had a far more congenial relationship than Trudeau and Lévesque had. Mulroney tasked Senator Lowell Murray with coordinating a possible agreement with the provinces. Bourassa announced that talks could proceed based on the five conditions, adding only the provision that "recognition of Quebec's distinct character" had to be an interpretive clause rather than a symbolic note in a revised preamble. (Note: The distinction is that an interpretive clause must influence any interpretation of the constitution when being judicially considered, as opposed to being a statement of values.)

At a meeting of the first ministers (the Prime Minister and provincial premiers) in Edmonton in August 1986, the ministers agreed to the "Edmonton Declaration". It stated that a "Quebec Round" of constitutional talks based on the five conditions would occur before further reforms would be undertaken.

== Consensus at Meech Lake ==
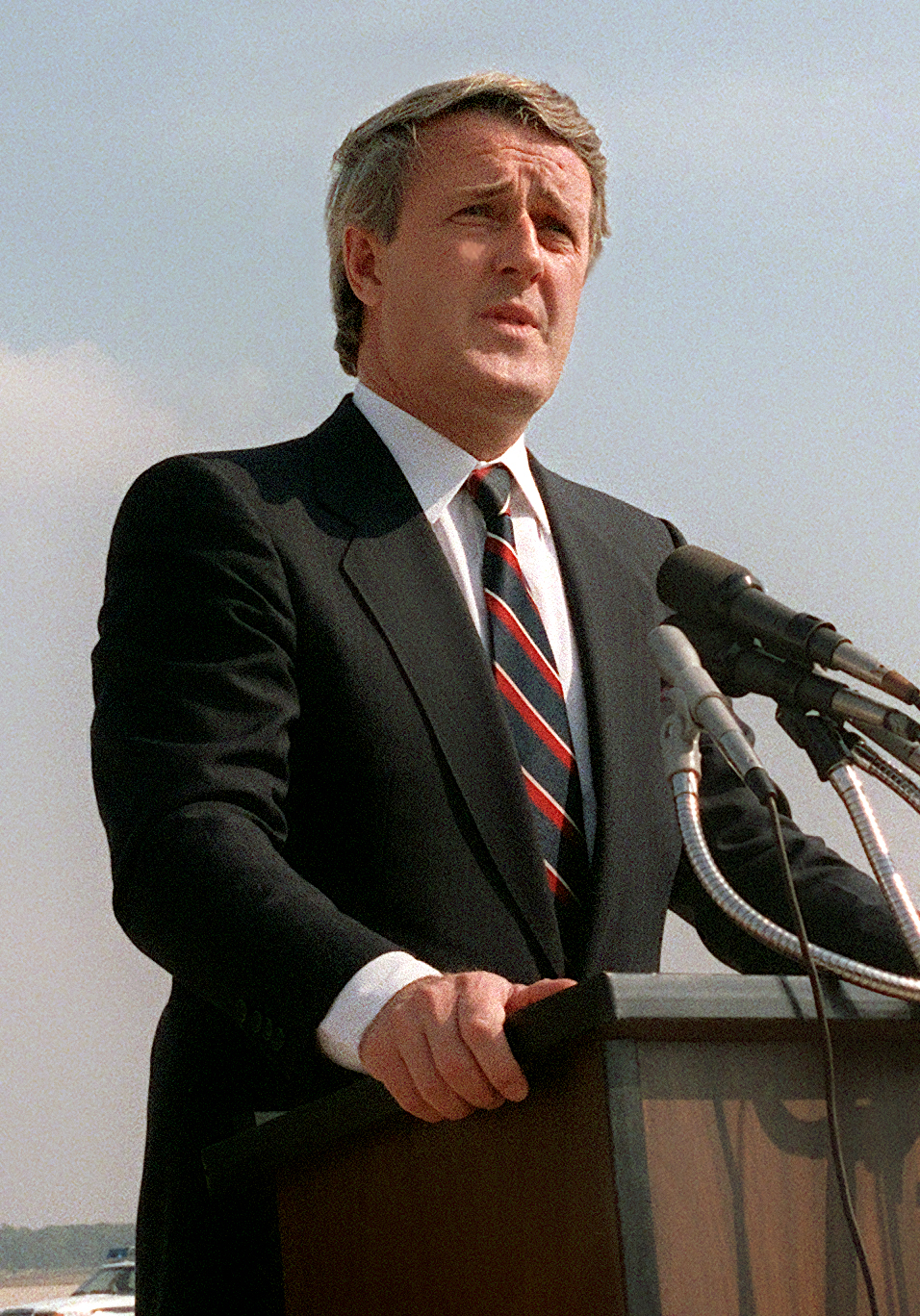
Brian Mulroney

Believing that a constitutional agreement was possible, Mulroney called a conference with provincial premiers for April 30, 1987, at Willson House, on the shores of Meech Lake, Quebec, in the Gatineau Hills. In contrast to previous constitutional conferences, which tended to feature a multitude of bureaucrats and advisors, the 11 first ministers were the only participants at the bargaining table. Other officials were kept downstairs and the media was locked out of the negotiation process.

Mulroney chaired the meeting, and agreement came quickly on the Supreme Court and immigration conditions, both of which were significantly an entrenchment of the status quo. The only agenda item added besides Quebec's conditions was Senate reform. After initially proposing abolition, Mulroney agreed to allow appointment from lists created by the provinces while awaiting further reform, which the provinces accepted. Changes to the amending formula and recognition of Quebec as a "distinct society" were the most contentious issues. Changes to the wording of the "distinct society clause" that also preserved rights for English and French minorities in other provinces gained acceptance by all representatives at the table.

After nine hours, the premiers and Mulroney announced a consensus for constitutional reform had been reached amongst the first ministers. The consensus would encompass five main modifications to the Canadian constitution:

- Quebec was recognized as a "distinct society" in Section 2 of the Constitution Act, 1867. This would operate as an interpretive clause for the entire constitution;
- More prospective constitutional amendments were now subject to s. 41 of the Constitution Act, 1982, which meant they required the approval of every province and the Federal government, including Senate reform, proportionate representation in the House of Commons, and the addition of new provinces;
- Provincial powers with respect to immigration were increased;
- Provinces were granted the right for reasonable financial compensation from the federal government if that province chose to opt out of any future federal programs in areas of exclusive provincial jurisdiction;
- The appointment of senators and Supreme Court justices, traditionally a prerogative of the prime minister, would be drawn from a selection of names provided by the provincial governments.

== Initial reaction ==
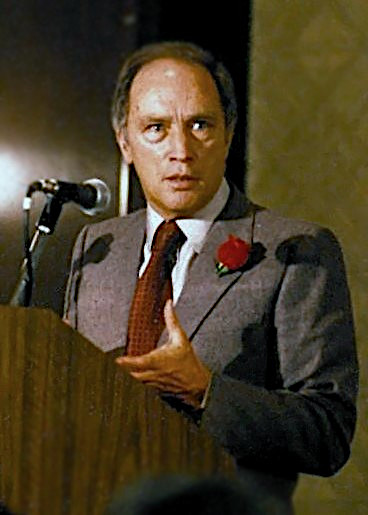
Pierre Trudeau was the Accord's first, and most prominent, opponent.

The initial reaction of the public was shock. Interest groups that had been involved in the constitutional debate, unaware that an agreement was practicable, had not thought to begin agitating for consultation. They were caught off balance by the accepted Accord. The only province to have public hearings after the Accord stage and before the legal text was drafted was Quebec.

National public opinion polls initially showed that a majority of Canadians supported the proposed agreement. Liberal Party leader John Turner and New Democratic Party leader Ed Broadbent announced their agreement with the consensus.

The first prominent opposition, as reported by the media, was from former Prime Minister Trudeau. In an open letter published in both the Toronto Star and La Presse on May 27, 1987, Trudeau attacked the Accord as a capitulation to provincialism and the end of any dream of "One Canada". Portraying "patriation" as the equalization of the bargaining power of federal and provincial governments that would allow Canada to survive indefinitely, Trudeau wrote that the new agreement made further devolution of powers inevitable. He referred to Mulroney as a "weakling," the Premiers as "snivelers," and invoked Bourassa's previous reneging of the Victoria Charter as suggesting that the Accord would be the beginning of concessions to Quebec and provincial interests.

Trudeau's well-known position as an ardent federalist and a prominent Québécois helped express the opposition to the Accord for many of its opponents. He generated concerns with the Accord in other groups that had embraced the Charter, such as Indigenous peoples, ethnic communities, and women. His position created turmoil in the federal and provincial Liberal parties, with the federal party split largely on linguistic lines, shaking John Turner's already fragile leadership.

== Final agreement ==
As the final agreement was to be drawn together in Ottawa on June 2, 1987, Trudeau's intervention had made him, in the words of Mulroney advisor L. Ian MacDonald, a "twelfth participant". The meeting, seen as a formality to precede a signing ceremony the next day, instead lasted 19 hours.

Manitoba NDP Premier Howard Pawley, faced with left-wing opposition to the consensus in his home province, insisted on more limited language regarding constraints on the federal spending power in the final agreement. Ontario Premier David Peterson, as the sole federal Liberal ally at the table (Bourassa's Quebec Liberal Party having severed ties with the Liberal Party of Canada in 1955), did not have support for it from most of his caucus (including his main adviser, Ian Scott). They opposed the consensus, and proposed a variety of amendments to the "federal spending power" and "distinct society" clauses. Pawley and Peterson agreed to follow each other's lead or back out together, to avoid either being seen as the cause of the collapse of talks. They asked Mulroney to take a harder line on federal powers.

Trudeau's intervention had also created a separate backlash: Mulroney and the other eight premiers, insulted by what they saw as undue interference, aggressively embraced the previous consensus. Bourassa in particular refused to move away from any of the Accord's major provisions. Negotiations went on through the night. They ultimately agreed on a clause promising that "the distinct society clause" would not derogate the Charter, providing protections for multicultural and aboriginal rights, and tighter language regarding restrictions on the federal spending power.

At a final roll call at 4:45 a.m. June 3, 1987, hours before the signing ceremony, Mulroney knowingly breached convention by taking the vote in reverse order around the table instead of the traditional order of a province's entry into confederation. Pawley, after pressure from federal NDP leader Ed Broadbent, conceded and approved the agreement. Peterson, the last to vote in this improvised formula, approved the final agreement on behalf of Ontario.

At the symbolic signing ceremony, the premiers signed the Accord. Bourassa declared that Quebec had become reintegrated in Canada to a standing ovation.

== Debate ==
=== Support ===
Supporters of the Accord argued that it would provide a generation of constitutional peace and do so in a simple and understandable way without major structural changes to the Federal government or the Canadian federation. Bourassa described Quebec's exclusion from the 1982 agreement as a "hole in the heart" that had to be mended before Quebec could become a normalized participant in constitutional matters. Mulroney and others, acknowledging that the agreement focused on primarily Quebec concerns, described the agreement as a "bridge" that, once accepted, would allow for further negotiations with other groups to proceed with Quebec's full participation.

Mulroney argued that the Senate and Supreme Court reforms would allow for greater involvement of other parties in what was generally a unilateral decision from the prime minister. It was an attempt to reduce what was seen as an overly powerful Prime Minister's Office. Mulroney would tell the Toronto Star, "You can have the old style of warring federalism, or you can have genuine co-operative federalism, on which we're trying to build a new country."

Proponents such as constitutional expert Peter Hogg said that the "distinct society" clause was merely an "affirmation of a sociological fact". Chief Justice Brian Dickson noted that court decisions had for decades taken Quebec's "character" into consideration on a standard basis.

=== Opposition ===
Opponents of the Accord took issue with both the process and ultimate results of the negotiations. Process objections focused on the agreement being negotiated in circumstances considered to be opaque and undemocratic: the amendments were effectively drafted and agreed to by the prime minister and ten premiers themselves in two meetings and were presented to their legislatures as a fait accompli. Some academics described the Accord as resulting from an exercise in "elite accommodation" not compatible with a more democratic Canada. Aside from Quebec, no province held public hearings on the Accord until opposition began to sprout.

Some critics said that "distinct society" focus unbalanced the federation, creating a "special status" for Quebec that would lead to asymmetrical federalism and the possible decline of the English-speaking community in Quebec and Francophones elsewhere in Canada. Aboriginal, feminist, and minority groups worried that courts could interpret the clause to allow the Quebec government to disregard sections of the Charter of Rights and Freedoms and of other constitutional protections in the name of preserving the province's culture.

Aboriginal groups were opposed to the amendments that involved constitutional change, as they had not had any representation in negotiations.

Former Prime Minister Trudeau and similar critics argued that the further devolution of powers was unnecessary and did not result in any "trade-off" with the federal government. Rather, the Accord reduced its ability to speak for all Canadians on matters of national interest.

Western and Atlantic Canada particularly objected to the lack of more substantive reforms in how the Senate membership was chosen, especially as the Accord required further Senate reform to be subject to unanimous approval by the provinces.

On the other hand, activists seeking sovereignty for Quebec were also unhappy; they generally opposed the agreement, believing that "recognition of Quebec as a distinct society" would be only moderately useful. They thought acceptance of the agreement would forestall devolution of further powers.

== Procedural ==
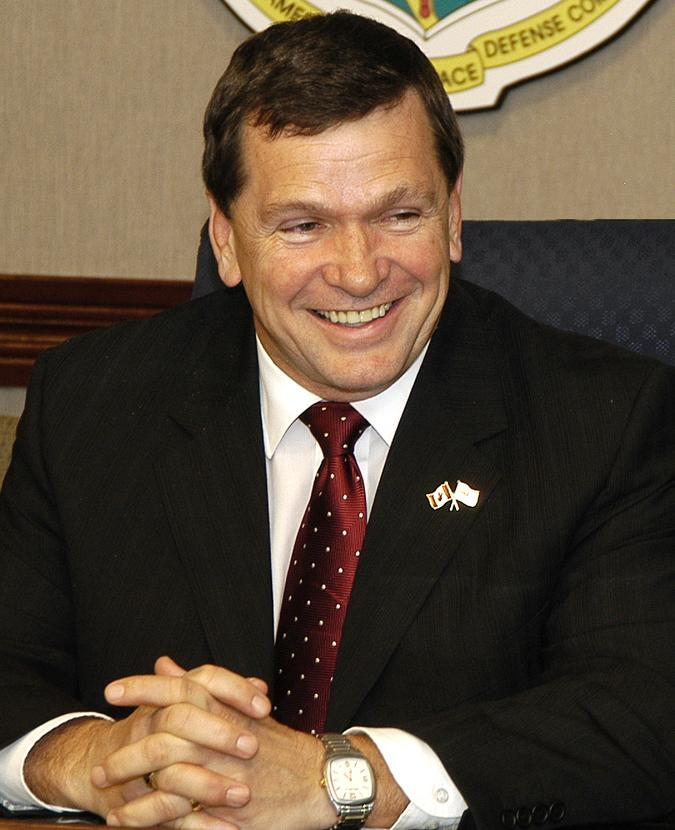
New Brunswick Premier Frank McKenna was the first to oppose the Accord, but would later become an advocate for its passage after his concerns were met.

Because the agreement would have changed the constitution's amending formula, it needed to obtain the consent of all provincial legislatures and the federal Parliament within three years. The signatory premiers undertook to have the Accord approved as soon as possible. Quebec passed the Accord on June 23, 1987, triggering the three-year time limit provided for by the Section 39(2) of the Constitution Act, 1982; this meant that June 22, 1990, would be the last possible day the Accord could pass. Saskatchewan ratified the Accord on September 23, 1987, and Alberta did likewise on December 7, 1987.

After the conclusion of public hearings, New Brunswick premier Richard Hatfield was unable to put the Accord to the floor of the provincial legislature, despite significant pressure from Mulroney. Hatfield's government lost every seat in the October 1987 New Brunswick election to the Frank McKenna-led Liberals. McKenna had campaigned on requesting changes to the Accord, especially protections for New Brunswick's linguistic duality, and demanded the changes before passing the Accord in New Brunswick. The unanimous provincial consensus was now gone, and with it much of the Accord's political momentum.

More surprising was the unexpected defeat of Howard Pawley's NDP majority government in Manitoba after a disgruntled backbencher voted against the government, prompting an election in April 1988. The result was a PC minority government under Gary Filmon that was tacitly supported by Gary Doer's NDP. The leader of the opposition, Liberal Sharon Carstairs, was a fervent opponent of the Accord, and believed some dissident PC and NDP members could be convinced to vote it down. The unstable confidence situation meant that all three leaders would have to negotiate on Manitoba's behalf.

Trudeau was invited to both the Commons and Senate committee hearings to discuss the Accord, with his later Senate appearance lasting several hours. The Senate, the majority of whose members Trudeau had appointed, rejected the Accord, prompting the House of Commons to use s.47 of the Constitution Act, 1982, to pass the amendment without the Senate's consent.

The Accord played very little role in the 1988 federal election, as all three parties supported the Accord and the Canada–United States Free Trade Agreement was the dominant issue. Bourassa's Liberals, who supported free trade, lent tacit support to the federal Progressive Conservatives and their campaign in favour of the agreement. This support was later speculated to have been a cause of a disconnect between left-wing intellectuals and support for the Accord, and was cited by the Manitoba NDP for their more lukewarm attitude toward the amendments after Pawley's retirement.

== Growing opposition ==
Shortly after the election, the Supreme Court of Canada ruled on Ford v. Quebec, a compendium of cases regarding sign restrictions in the Charter of the French Language. While acknowledging the protection of Quebec's French identity as a pressing and substantial objective, the Court ruled that the outright ban on English-language signs was a violation of the Canadian Charter of Rights and Freedoms and ordered the language restrictions be struck down.

The decision reignited the long-simmering debate over language use in Quebec. While English-language groups celebrated the decision, the Parti Québécois and nationalist groups demanded Bourassa use the notwithstanding clause to uphold the Charter of the French Language against the court ruling. Both Mulroney and Peterson pressured Bourassa not to use the notwithstanding clause, while prominent Quebec cabinet minister and nationalist Claude Ryan threatened to resign if the clause was not used.

Bourassa opted to not only use the notwithstanding clause but also propose Bill 178, which continued the ban on outdoor signs, causing four of his English-speaking ministers to resign and sparking general outrage in English Canada. Manitoba Premier Gary Filmon, calling the move a violation of the "spirit of Meech Lake," immediately ordered that public hearings regarding the Accord be ended and that it be withdrawn from consideration pending a new constitutional conference, officially joining New Brunswick in opposing the Accord. John Turner and the federal Liberals, who had gained little traction in Quebec from their pro-Meech stance in the previous election, attacked Mulroney for what was seen as federal acquiescence to and, in the case of Lucien Bouchard and Louis Plamondon, approval of Bill 178.

The Accord would gain a third opponent after the 1989 Newfoundland election, which saw the Liberals under Clyde Wells defeat the PC government of premier Tom Rideout. Wells had campaigned against the Accord, as he was opposed to changing the amending formula before Senate reform, the restrictions on the federal spending power, and felt that Quebec would use the "distinct society" provision to gain special status in Confederation. Wells demanded a re-opening of the Accord. A conference held in November 1989 failed to break the logjam, and featured a bitter argument on national television between Wells and Mulroney.

As the political discourse moved from the contents of the Accord to the possible results of its demise, palpable tension arose between English and French speakers throughout Canada. Using Bourassa's use of the notwithstanding clause as justification, groups such as the Alliance for the Preservation of English in Canada convinced municipalities such as Sault Ste. Marie to pass bylaws outlawing the provision of French language services. A video clip of protesters stomping a Quebec flag in Brockville, Ontario, was replayed frequently on Quebec television to symbolize English Canada's opposition to the Accord.

== Charest Commission and Bouchard ==
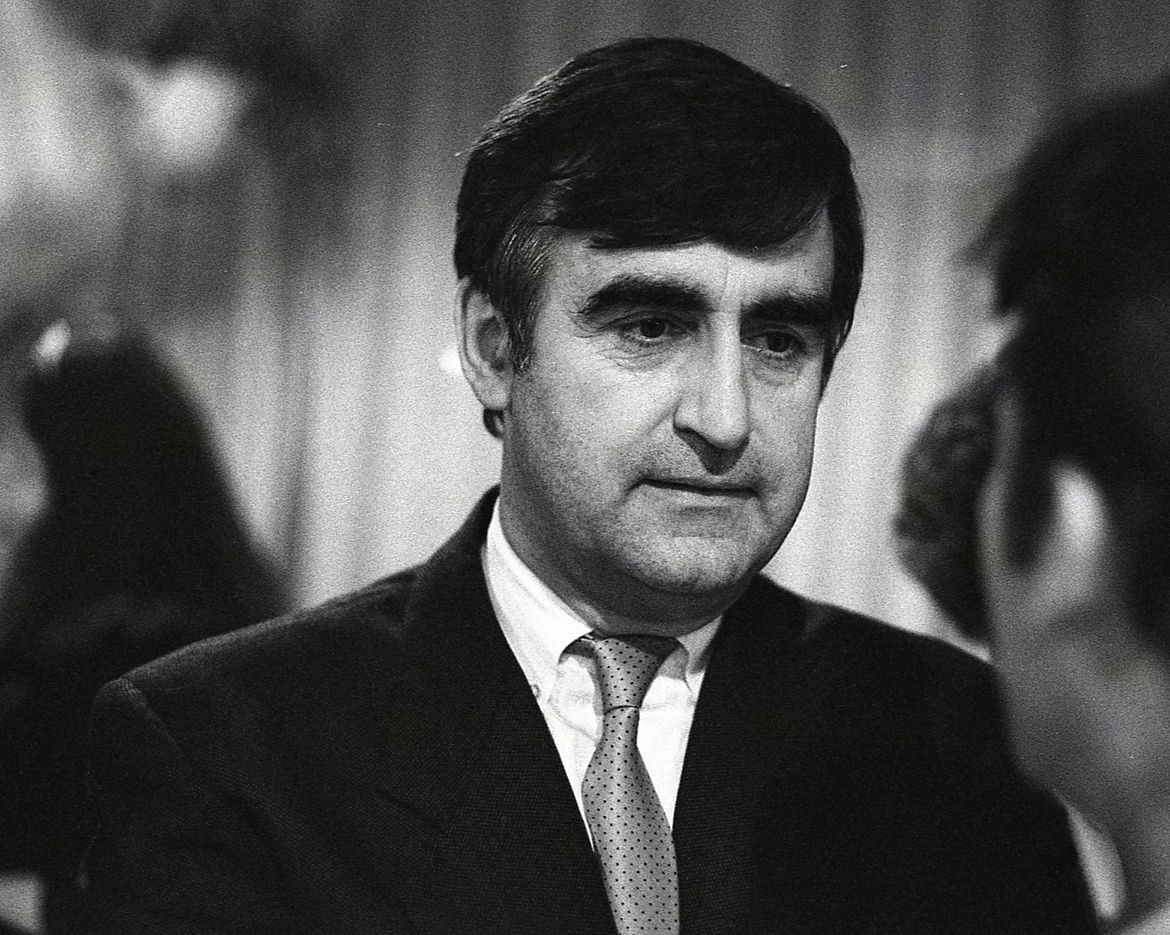
Lucien Bouchard's dramatic opposition to the supplemental accord raised his profile and resulted in the launch of the Bloc Québécois.

In April 1990, Wells invoked section 46(2) of the Constitution Act, 1982 to revoke Newfoundland's previous assent to the Accord. This meant that the Accord now required passage in three provinces: Manitoba, New Brunswick, and Newfoundland.

Hope for the Accord gained momentum after New Brunswick proposed a series of alternate concerns that would have to be addressed to enable passage of the original agreement. Jean Charest, a former federal cabinet minister, was tasked with heading a commission on addressing New Brunswick's concerns on March 22, 1990, which expanded into an attempt to forge an all-party consensus on the Accord. Despite his opposition, leading Liberal leadership candidate Jean Chrétien, wishing the issue to be off the table, used back channels to pressure Wells to support the agreement. On May 17, 1990, the commission recommended a companion accord that would be approved by all provinces along with Meech Lake; this would permit the original accord to stay in place, saving face for Quebec and the federal government, while addressing the concerns of other provinces. The companion Accord asserted that the distinct society clause would be subject to the Charter and would feature greater protections for minority language rights in the provinces.

Bourassa dismissed the report the day it was released. Anger at reading its contents prompted Lucien Bouchard, Mulroney's Environment Minister and Quebec lieutenant, to send a telegram from Paris to a gathering in his native Alma lavishly praising the Parti Québécois and René Lévesque, to be read by PQ leader Jacques Parizeau. Upon Bouchard's return to Canada, Mulroney demanded he clarify the remark or resign, and Bouchard supplied a lengthy letter of resignation on May 22, 1990. The two men, who had been close friends since attending law school at Université Laval together, did not speak for several decades afterward, but reconciled shortly before Mulroney's death in 2024. After leaving the Cabinet and PC caucus, Bouchard sat as an independent. He made a speech in defence of the original Meech Lake Accord and stated that without it, sovereignty was the only option. Bourassa announced his support of Bouchard's action from the National Assembly, and said it provided a clear warning to English Canada of what would occur if Meech failed.

== "The Last Supper" and the Companion Accord ==
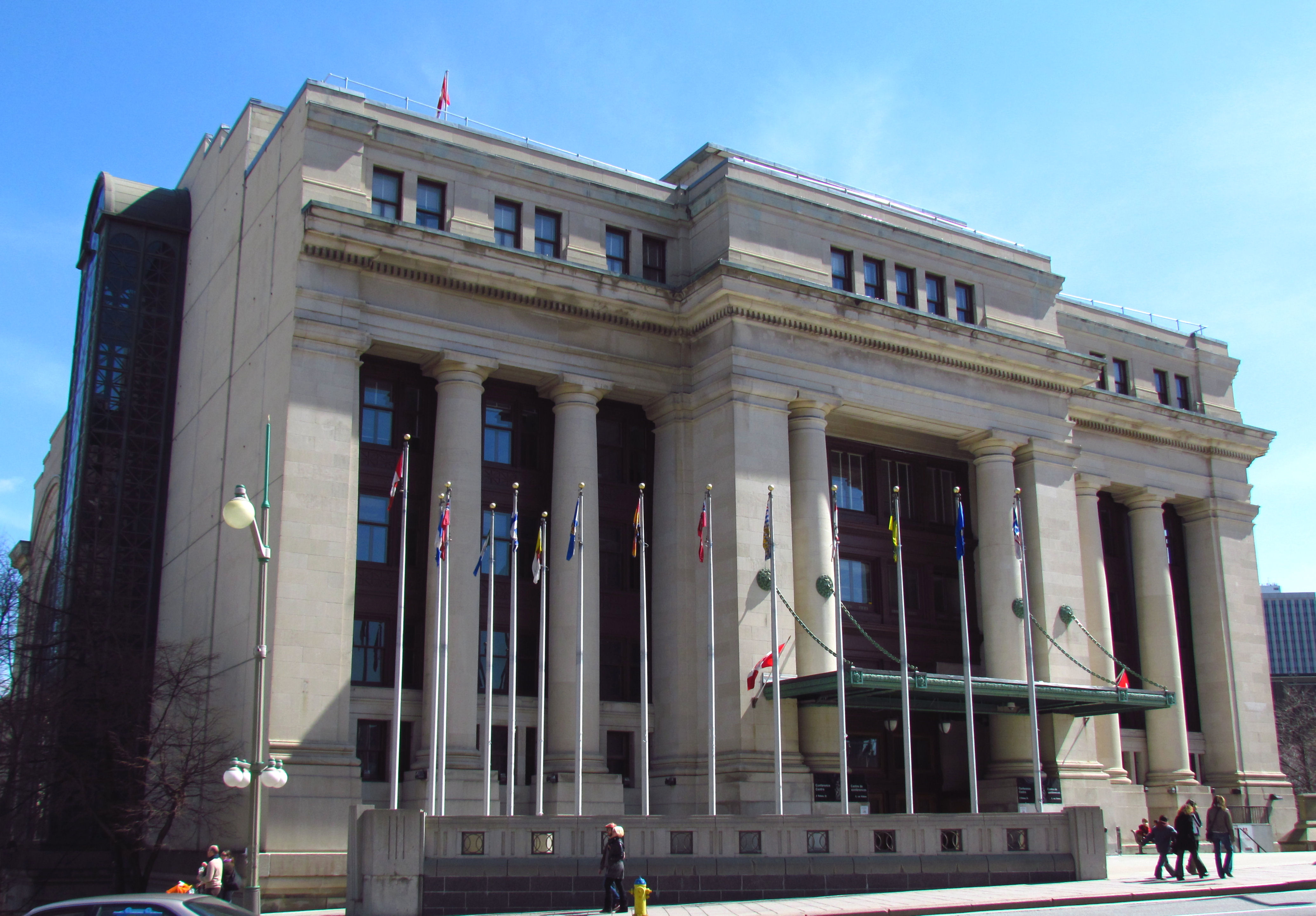
The Government Conference Centre in Ottawa, where all signing ceremonies with regard to the Accord (and its eventual companion) were held.

On June 3, 1990, after each premier met individually with the prime minister at 24 Sussex Drive, the first ministers met at the Canadian Museum of Civilization in Hull. Scheduled as a one-day meeting, the premiers instead met for a week at the National Conference Centre and the Government Conference Centre. The combined media presence outside created an atmosphere of chaos and drama, with repeated intonations by Mulroney and other federal officials that acceptance of the Accord was necessary for the very survival of Canada. As the process wore on, journalists noted that the secrecy and spin began to echo the original meetings that had created problems in the first place. According to historian Michael Bliss, "Many found the spectacle nauseating."

After an unsuccessful first day, McKenna attempted to start conversation by announcing that New Brunswick would support the Accord. The second day saw Filmon agree to a second accord being enacted a number of months after the original passed, allowing for all sides to show more flexibility.

At the meeting, Bourassa conceded that a second accord could be adopted that included a guarantee that distinct society would not weaken gender equality and give the territories involvement in the appointment of senators and Supreme Court justices. The premiers also agreed to hold future conferences on Aboriginal and minority language issues, the creation of a "Canada Clause" to guide judicial decisions in the same manner as "distinct society", a new process for how new provinces would be formed, and a new amending procedure.

Wells, however, was still not satisfied with the proposed conditions, and threatened to walk out of the conference. After being physically stopped by Alberta Premier Don Getty, he was asked what his conditions were for acceptance, and Wells replied that he needed a guarantee that Senate reform would be carried out. The Ontario delegation then proposed a new formula: a clause would be placed in the new accord for Senate reform negotiations to continue to 1995. If negotiations failed by 1995, Ontario would agree to give up six Senate seats, meaning that Quebec would have 24 seats, Ontario 18, Prince Edward Island 4, and the remaining provinces 8. Wells immediately agreed in principle.

The next day, another signing ceremony was held, but Wells protested that the draft agreement had deleted a request that a 10-year review be conducted on the distinct society clause without informing him. The clause was never seriously considered by federal negotiators who, thinking it would be a poison pill for Quebec, had never brought it to Bourassa's attention. Wells put an asterisk next to his signature, but promised that the Accord would be put before the Newfoundland House of Assembly or to a referendum.

== Final days ==
The apparent success of the negotiations was offset by a statement made by Mulroney the following day. When describing the negotiation process to The Globe and Mail, the prime minister stated that he had intentionally scheduled the final conference until the last few days before the amendment could be passed to put pressure on the attendees, which would allow him to "roll the dice" and force the deal to go through.

Susan Delacourt and Graham Fraser reported Mulroney's remark, prompting general outrage in both the political class and the public for its apparently flippant nature, which contrasted heavily with Mulroney's sombre language and remarks about the necessity of the Accord passing during the previous conference. Filmon and Wells both expressed their displeasure with the remark, and Filmon declared that, while he would place the Accord in front of the Manitoba legislature, he would not exempt it from public hearing requirements. Liberal leadership contender Jean Chrétien, who had been considering endorsing the Accord, backed off after the remark. Peterson and Stanley Hartt, Mulroney's chief of staff, believed that the remark killed any chance of the Accord passing. (Note: Newman suggests that the remark itself wasn't even true, as a variety of foreign heads of state had visited and crowded the Prime Minister's schedule. (Newman, 128)) Wells had determined that a referendum was impractical in the short time period, and arranged for the Accord to be put to a free vote in the Newfoundland House of Assembly, with himself opposing ratification. In a highly unusual manoeuvre, Mulroney, Peterson, and McKenna addressed the House of Assembly and urged it to accept the Accord.

On June 12, Filmon attempted to introduce the Accord for debate in the Manitoba legislature. Unanimous consent was required to do so. (Note: This was necessary to circumvent Legislature rules requiring two days advance notice before a motion is placed on the Order Paper.) Elijah Harper, the legislature's only Indigenous member, raised an eagle feather to mark his opposition to the Accord, preventing the legislature from debating it. Filmon repeatedly attempted to introduce the Accord over the next several legislative sitting days, but Harper's dissent prevented him from doing so. Harper's opposition reflected wider concerns about the Accord among Indigenous groups, who felt excluded from constitutional discussions. Meanwhile, New Brunswick ratified the accord on June 15, now leaving Manitoba and Newfoundland as the remaining holdouts.

Filmon was finally able to introduce the Accord on June 20, and debate on the measure continued for the next two days. On June 22, 1990 – the final day ratification was possible – the Manitoba legislature reached the end of its session without having voted on the Accord. A motion was proposed to continue meeting beyond normal hours, which would require unanimous support. Harper again dissented, which resulted in the legislature adjourning without voting on the Accord. Filmon contacted Wells in Newfoundland and advised him of the situation. Accordingly, Wells and opposition leader Tom Rideout agreed to cancel the planned free vote in the Newfoundland House of Assembly as unnecessary, believing the likely outcome would have been a rejection. The federal government had considered asking the Supreme Court to extend the deadline if Manitoba had been the only holdout, but Wells' cancelation of the Newfoundland vote made this effort moot.

With Manitoba and Newfoundland's failure to ratify the Meech Lake Accord, the amendments lapsed on June 23, 1990, pursuant to Section 39(2) of the Constitution Act, 1982. They had received the assent of the federal government and eight provinces, totalling 96% of the population.

== Aftermath ==
Following the failure to ratify the accord, the leaders of the three major federal political parties each made a televised address on the subject. Mulroney, while tacitly blaming Wells for the accord's failure, and also attributing the outcome of the process to the accord's becoming a "lightning rod" for discontent with the federal government, accepted that certain concerns about the process ought to have been addressed earlier, and warned against renewed attempts at Quebec secession. Herb Gray, who was acting as opposition leader following Turner's resignation earlier in the year, called the outcome "a failure of Brian Mulroney to live up to his responsibility to provide honest leadership and straightforward management of constitutional change in this country", accused the process of having been fundamentally flawed and not having sufficiently involved the wider public, and emphasized that the failure of the accord should not be interpreted as the rest of Canada repudiating Quebec. NDP leader Audrey McLaughlin likewise felt the process to have been severely flawed, describing it as "eleven men behind closed doors", and particularly criticized it as having failed to take into consideration the needs of women, minorities, and indigenous peoples, while calling out Mulroney for his attempts to blame the provincial legislatures that either resisted the accord or did not pass it at all.

=== Quebec ===
In a speech to the National Assembly of Quebec delivered the next day, Bourassa captured the nationalist sentiment of the moment:

Le Canada anglais doit comprendre de façon très claire que, quoi qu'on dise et quoi qu'on fasse, le Québec est, aujourd'hui et pour toujours, une société distincte, libre et capable d'assumer son destin et son développement.

English Canada must clearly understand that, no matter what is said or done, Quebec is, today and forever, a distinct society, free and able to assume control of its destiny and development.

Jacques Parizeau, leader of the opposition, crossed the floor to shake Bourassa's hand and referred to him as "my Premier". On June 25, an estimated 500,000 Quebecers marched in the Saint-Jean-Baptiste Day celebrations in Quebec City, during which actor Jean Duceppe delivered a speech calling for independence. Polls at this time showed a majority of 61–64% in favour of sovereignty-association. Bourassa, in an attempt to constructively capture nationalist sentiment, declared he would negotiate only with the Federal government, and later passed Bill 150, which promised a referendum by October 26, 1992, on a revised constitutional agreement or sovereignty for Quebec. Despite these initiatives, Bourassa remained privately committed to federalism, believing that sovereignty, while possible, was unworkable.

Bouchard and other alienated Quebec MPs united to form the Bloc Québécois under his leadership.

=== Other provinces ===
Ontario Premier David Peterson had, reluctantly, played a prominent role in creating the accord and continued to support it in the face of growing opposition. This led to a backlash in his own province, especially regarding his promise to provide Senate seats to other provinces. His party was defeated by Bob Rae's NDP within months in the 1990 snap election. The severe unpopularity of the Accord in the western provinces also helped contribute to the downfall of Don Getty and Grant Devine, the premiers of Alberta and Saskatchewan respectively, both of whom had been among its most steadfast supporters. Devine's government was ejected from power the following year in a landslide that eliminated the provincial Progressive Conservatives as a political force, while Getty resigned in late 1992 with polls showing his own government on track for a similarly heavy defeat (though they were, in the event, re-elected under succeeding Premier Ralph Klein).

In response to criticism of the Accord, British Columbia and Alberta enacted legislation requiring future constitutional amendments to be put to a referendum before being approved by the legislature.

Mulroney's popularity plummeted. Many condemned his handling of the Accord, and the exhaustive and interminable debates over it caused a backlash against further constitutional negotiations. In November 1990, Mulroney sought the input of Canadians on the country's constitutional future by convening the Citizen's Forum on National Unity. The forum was more commonly known as the Spicer Commission, after its chair, Keith Spicer.

A variety of constitutional conferences and the efforts of former Prime Minister Joe Clark resulted in the Charlottetown Accord, which contained many of the same proposals, along with concrete involvement of First Nations groups. The Charlottetown Accord, unlike Meech Lake, was put to referendums (on October 26, 1992), but it was also defeated in most provinces, including Quebec. Following these attempts to make further amendments to the Constitution have been recognized as extremely difficult.

Questions 6, 8, and 9 of the 2026 Alberta referendum asked voters if Alberta should promote similar proposals to the Accord with regard to appointment of judges, compensation for opting out of national programs, and provincial autonomy; the measures were defeated by 54%, 55%, and 57% of the vote respectively.

== See also ==
- The Black Sheep (French: Le Mouton noir), 1992 documentary film
- First Nations
- The Canadian Crown and Aboriginal peoples

== Bibliography ==
- Bliss, Michael (2004). Right Honourable Men: The Descent of Canadian Politics from Macdonald to Chrétien. Toronto: Harper Perennial Canada. ISBN 0-00-639484-1.
- Cohen, Andrew (1990). A Deal Undone: The Making and Breaking of the Meech Lake Accord. Vancouver/Toronto: Douglas & McIntyre. ISBN 0-88894-704-6.
- MacDonald, L. Ian (2002). From Bourassa to Bourassa: Wilderness to Restoration (2nd ed.). Montreal: McGill-Queen's University Press. ISBN 0-7735-2392-8.
- Newman, Peter C. (2005). The Secret Mulroney Tapes: Unguarded Confessions of a Prime Minister. Toronto: Random House. ISBN 0-679-31352-4.
