= CKNG-FM =

Radio station in Edmonton, Alberta

- Edmonton, Alberta; Canada
- Broadcast area: Edmonton Metropolitan Region
- Frequency: 92.5 MHz
- Branding: Chuck @ 92.5

Programming
- Format: Adult hits

Ownership
- Owner: Corus Entertainment; (Corus Premium Television Ltd.)
- Sister stations: CHED, CISN-FM, CITV-DT

History
- First air date: August 11, 1982
- Former call signs: CJAX-FM (1982–1986)
- Call sign meaning: "King" (former branding)

Technical information
- Class: C
- ERP: 97,000 watts
- HAAT: 200.3 metres (657 ft)
- Transmitter coordinates: 53°27′47″N 113°20′6.5″W

Links
- Website: chuck925.com

CKNG-FM (92.5 MHz) is a radio station in Edmonton, Alberta, Canada. The station plays an adult hits format branded on-air as Chuck @ 92.5. CKNG's studios are located on 84th Street in southeastern Edmonton, while its transmitter is located near Anthony Henday Drive in eastern Edmonton. The station is owned by Corus Entertainment.

CKNG was the ninth most listened to radio station in the Edmonton market in the fall of 2008 but as of fall 2012, the station is ranked twelfth with a 3.3 percent share.

For the 2013 winter season, CKNG-FM was the tenth most listened to radio station with a 5.1% share.

As of Feb 28, 2021, CKNG is the 12th-most-listened-to radio station in the Edmonton market according to a PPM data report released by Numeris.

== History ==
Joe FM logo from 2010-2013

On October 29, 1981, CFCN Communications, Ltd. was awarded a license for a new FM station to broadcast at 92.5 MHz. The station officially launched on August 11, 1982, as CJAX-FM, and aired a country format. In June 1986, CJAX flipped to soft rock, and changed its call letters to CKNG-FM, branding itself as King FM. In 1989, CKNG was sold to Moffat Communications. In September 1991, CKNG-FM became Power 92, a CHR/Top 40 station, which launched with The Power by Snap. In August 1992, the station was sold to Westcom Radio. On January 30, 2000, the station was sold to Corus Entertainment, and became a Corus station. On June 27, 2003, CKNG shifted to hot adult contemporary as Power 92.5. Seven months later, on January 13, 2004, the station flipped to adult hits, branded as 92.5 Joe FM, taking the format from sister station CHQT, which returned to oldies.

Fresh FM logo from 2013-2015

Fresh FM logo from 2015-2018

On January 9, 2013, CKNG returned to hot adult contemporary, branded as The New 92.5 Fresh FM, becoming the third Corus radio station to adopt the "Fresh FM" branding.

On August 3, 2018, CKNG once again returned to adult hits, branded as 92.5 The 'Chuck. Corus FM radio director Brad Phillips described the new format as being "super-localized" with nods to local culture and humour; its branding is derived from a nickname for the city. After having aired the syndicated Brooke & Jeffrey out of Seattle, and later Willy in the Morning from Vancouver sister station CFMI-FM, afternoon host Graham Mosimann began hosting The Morning Thing in August 2024.
