= CISN-FM =

Radio station in Edmonton, Alberta

- Edmonton, Alberta; Canada
- Broadcast area: Edmonton Metropolitan Region
- Frequency: 103.9 MHz
- Branding: 103.9 CISN Country

Programming
- Format: Country
- Affiliations: Premiere Networks; Westwood One

Ownership
- Owner: Corus Entertainment; (Corus Radio Company)
- Sister stations: CHED, CKNG-FM, CITV-DT

History
- First air date: 5 June 1982
- Call sign meaning: Pronounced like "kissin'"

Technical information
- Class: C
- ERP: 98,000 watts
- HAAT: 200.3 metres (657 ft)
- Transmitter coordinates: 53°27′47″N 113°20′6.5″W

Links
- Webcast: Listen Live
- Website: cisnfm.com

CISN-FM (103.9 MHz, 103.9 CISN Country) is a radio station that broadcasts from Edmonton, Alberta, Canada. It is owned by Corus Entertainment, which also operates CHED and CKNG-FM. The station has a country format, playing both current hits and past favourites. CISN is one of the longest broadcasting FM stations in Edmonton. CISN's studios are located on 84th Street in downtown Edmonton, while its transmitter is located near Anthony Henday Drive in eastern Edmonton.

As of 28 February 2021, CISN is the 7th-most-listened-to radio station in the Edmonton market according to a PPM data report released by Numeris.

== Rebroadcasters ==
CISN also operates on a number of low-power FM transmitters in some areas of Canada.

=== Alberta ===
Rebroadcasters of CISN-FM
City of licence	Identifier	Frequency	Power	Class	RECNet	CRTC Decision
Luscar	CFOG-FM	90.1 FM	20 watts	LP	Query	91-209
Rainbow Lake	VF2294	103.9 FM	10 watts	VLP	Query	CRTC 95-704

=== British Columbia ===
Rebroadcasters of CISN-FM
City of licence	Identifier	Frequency	Power	Class	RECNet	CRTC Decision
Donald Station	VF2002	100.1 FM	21 watts	LP	Query	96-6
Chetwynd	VF2015	103.9 FM	34 watts	LP	Query	91-335
Fort St. James	VF2099	97.9 FM	50 watts	LP	Query	
McBride	VF2152	103.1 FM	37 watts	LP	Query	91-871
Kemano	VF2203	93.5 FM	10 watts	VLP	Query	93-66
Valemount	VF2221	104.1 FM	16 watts	LP	Query	94-444
Avola	VF2315	89.7 FM	8 watts	VLP	Query	98-145
Blue River	VF2317	90.3 FM	8 watts	VLP	Query	98-144
Granisle	VF2351	100.5 FM	1 watt	VLP	Query	99-36
Campbell Road	VF2377	103.9 FM	11 watts	LP	Query	2000-193
Fraser Lake	VF2474	93.1 FM	36 watts	LP	Query	98-210
Passmore	VF2457	90.7 FM	190 watts	A1	Query	2004-144

=== Newfoundland and Labrador ===
Rebroadcasters of CISN-FM
City of licence	Identifier	Frequency	Power	Class	RECNet	CRTC Decision
Burgeo	VF2075	90.5 FM	50 watts	LP	Query	95-48
Labrador City/Wabush	VF2150	101.3 FM	37 watts	LP	Query	

== Awards ==
CISN-FM was the winner of the Canadian Country Music Association's Annual Country Station of the Year (Major Market Category) five times since the award's 2000 creation, having won in 2003, 2004, 2009, 2010, 2012 and 2016.
