= CHED (AM) =

Radio station in Edmonton, Alberta

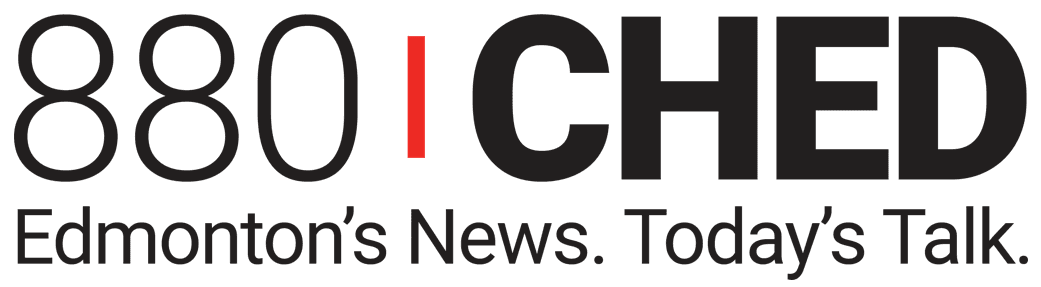
- Edmonton, Alberta; Canada
- Broadcast area: Edmonton Metropolitan Region
- Frequency: 880 kHz
- Branding: 880 CHED

Programming
- Language: English
- Format: News/talk
- Affiliations: CBS News Radio; Edmonton Elks; Edmonton Oilers

Ownership
- Owner: Corus Entertainment; (Corus Premium Television Ltd.)
- Sister stations: CISN-FM, CKNG-FM, CITV-DT

History
- First air date: March 3, 1954
- Former frequencies: 1080 kHz (1954–1963); 630 kHz (1963–2024)
- Call sign meaning: CH- prefix, Edmonton

Technical information
- Class: B
- Power: 50,000 watts day; 10,000 watts night
- Transmitter coordinates: 53°29′26″N 113°26′55″W

Links
- Website: globalnews.ca/radio/880ched

CHED (880 kHz) is a radio station licensed to Edmonton, Alberta. Owned by Corus Entertainment, it broadcasts a news/talk format, and first signed on in 1954. Its studios are located on 84th Street and Roper Road in Edmonton, while its transmitters are located southeast of Edmonton.

The station originally began broadcasting on March 3, 1954, on the frequency of 1080 kHz, and moved to 630 kHz on May 14, 1963. On June 26, 2024, as part of cuts by the company, Corus disbanded CHED's All-news radio sister station CHQT, and began simulcasting CHED's programming on CHQT's 880 kHz frequency due to its better signal. After several months of simulcasting, CHED permanently moved to CHQT's signal on October 9, 2024.

CHED broadcasts at 50,000 watts, using a non-directional antenna in the daytime. As AM 880 is a clear channel frequency, CHED must use a directional antenna at night. The station formerly broadcasting in C-QUAM AM stereo.

== History ==
Originally owned by Hugh Sibbald, Lloyd Moffat, and E. A. Rawlinson, the station first signed on to 1080 kHz at 8:00 p.m. on March 3, 1954, from studios on the corner of 107 Street and 100 Avenue in Downtown Edmonton. On May 14, 1963, at 6:30 am, CHED switched to 630 kHz. Beginning in 1959, CHED aired a Top 40/CHR format.

Jerry Forbes ran the first 630 CHED Santas Anonymous in 1955. The charity provided 600 toys to children in its first year and is still run annually as of 2020. In the latest edition, the toy drive provided toys to over 20,000 children.

In 1970, Bob Layton joined the station as a writer for Frank Robertson. The following year after Frank left the station, Bob went on the air as his replacement, beginning a near 50-year career in broadcasting. He would go on to win several national awards for his radio editorials.

According to the 1976 BBM Weekly Reach survey, CHED was the most-listened-to radio station in Edmonton. This marked a period in which the Top-40 format lead CHED to become "the" radio station in the region. This continued until FM frequencies began pulling listeners away and on December 1, 1993, the station relaunched with a news/talk format.

On July 6, 2000, Corus Entertainment acquired the broadcast license for CHED from Western International Communications.

Throughout the 2010s, CHED was consistently in the top 3 of the most-listened-to radio stations in the Edmonton market, with a listener share reaching as high as 11.5 in 2016.

As of February 28, 2021, CHED is the 4th-most-listened-to radio station in the Edmonton market according to a PPM data report released by Numeris.

On June 26, 2024, CHED's programming began to be simulcast on 880 AM CHQT. Corus stated at the time that the simulcast was an interim measure and that the company would ultimately only operate one news-talk AM station in Edmonton, but did not specify its plans for the signal.

Logo before 2020 branding

Logo from 2020 to 2024

On August 28, 2024, Corus announced that the CHED intellectual unit, including its call letters and format, would move permanently to 880 AM, effective October 9, citing that facility's improved coverage. While both stations operated at a power of 50 kilowatts, the 880 AM transmitter is non-directional during the day whereas 630 is directional at all times. Corus intends to then return the 630 AM licence to the CRTC for cancellation, and sell the land on which that transmitter facility currently sits.

== Programming ==
CHED has been operating a news/talk/sports format since 1993. The station's current morning show is hosted by Stacey Brotzel and Daryl McIntyre. Former morning hosts have included Ryan Jespersen, who was fired in September 2020 after comments he made regarding a city councillor's staff, and Shaye Ganam, who began hosting a 9 a.m. show simulcast with Calgary sister station CHQR on April 12, 2021. Its afternoon lineup features Courtney Theriault, followed by Bryn Griffiths on afternoon drive.

CHED has been the flagship station of the Edmonton Oilers of the National Hockey League since 1995; its contract with the Oilers was most recently renewed through the 2026–27 season. The station also broadcasts Oilers Now, a daily talk show hosted by the team's radio colour analyst Bob Stauffer. It is also the flagship station of the Edmonton Elks of the Canadian Football League.

The talk show Charles Adler Tonight was syndicated on CHED every weeknight from 2016 to 2021.

Angus Watt has provided regular financial updates on CHED since the 1970s.

During off peak time and on weekends, the station features several local and syndicated programs. These include The Garden Show, Money Talks, The Shift, and Couch Potatoes.
