= Canadian Western Bank =

Canadian bank based in Edmonton, Alberta

- Traded as: TSX: CWB
- Industry: Banking
- Predecessors: Bank of Alberta; Western & Pacific Bank
- Founded: 1988; 38 years ago Edmonton, Alberta
- Defunct: 2025
- Fate: Acquired by the National Bank of Canada in 2025
- Successor: National Bank of Canada
- Headquarters: Canadian Western Bank Place; 10303 Jasper Avenue; Edmonton, Alberta, Canada
- Key people: Chris Fowler, CEO
- Products: Financial services
- Revenue: ▲CA$1.2 billion (2024)
- Net income: ▼CA$296 million (2024)
- AUM: ▲CA$9.4 billion (2024)
- Total assets: ▲CA$43.1 billion (2024)
- Total equity: ▲CA$4.4 billion (2024)
- Number of employees: 2,569 (FTE, 2024)
- Website: www.cwbank.com

Canadian Western Bank (CWB; French: Banque canadienne de l'Ouest), doing business as the CWB Financial Group, was a Canadian bank based in Edmonton, Alberta. The bank primarily operated in western Canada, although it also operated several branches in eastern Canada.

The CWB was established in 1988 through the merger of the Bank of Alberta and the Western & Pacific Bank of Canada. In 2025, CWB was acquired by the National Bank of Canada, and its operations were rebranded under the National Bank brand.

== History ==
Canadian Western Bank was formed through the 1988 merger of two banks: the Bank of Alberta (founded 1984), and the Western & Pacific Bank of Canada (founded 1982). It was led by Bank of Alberta co-founders Charles Alexander Allard and Eugene Pechet.

In 1993, it acquired Western Canadian branches of Metropolitan Trust. In 1994, Canadian Western Bank and North West Trust Company merged into Canadian Western Bank. In 1996, it acquired BC Bancorp (chartered in 1967), and purchased the Aetna Trust Company, which was renamed Canadian Western Trust Company. In 2001, it acquired the Kelowna and Regina branches of the Laurentian Bank of Canada.

It was announced on June 11, 2024 that it would be acquired by National Bank of Canada in 2025. The acquisition was completed in March 2025, with CWB rebranding under the National Bank brand.

=== Acquisition history ===
- Western Canadian branches of Metropolitan Trust, 1993
- Acquired BC Bancorp (chartered 1967), 1996
- Aetna Trust Company, 1996 - renamed Canadian Western Trust Company 1996
- Kelowna and Regina branches of Laurentian Bank, 2001
- Canadian Direct Insurance Inc. (CDII), 2004
- Valiant Trust Company, 2004
- Branch of National Bank of Greece (Canada), 2005
- National Leasing, 2010
- Maxium Group, 2016
- iA Investment Counsel Inc., 2020

== Operations ==
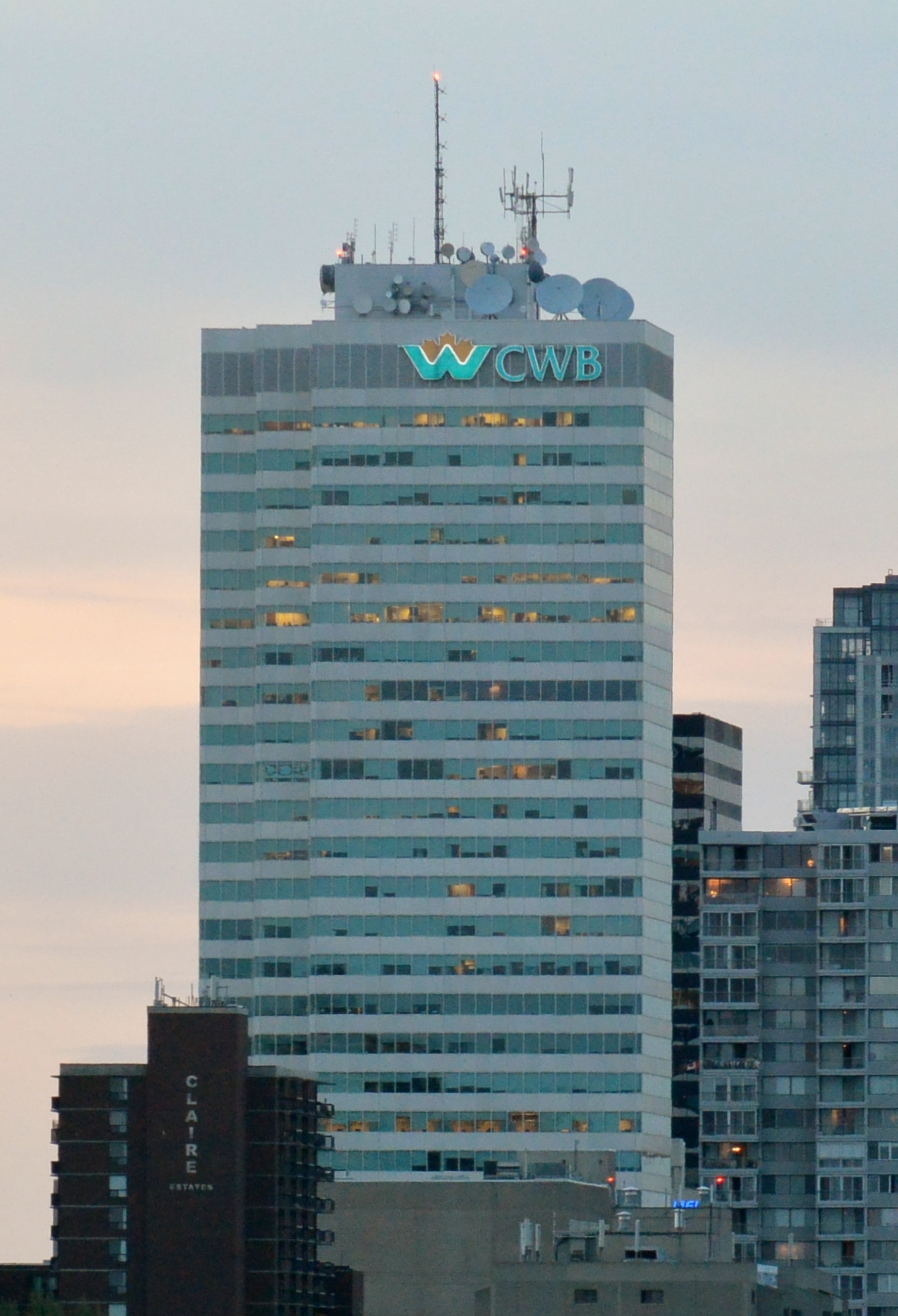
Canadian Western Bank Place in Downtown Edmonton, Alberta, housed the bank's headquarters

The CWB Financial Group was made up of 10 banking, lending, wealth and trust companies. It had an expanding loan book in BC, Alberta and Ontario.

Canadian Western Bank's operating affiliates included:

- Motive Financial (100% ownership) – high-interest savings accounts, GICs, and TFSAs. Before 2017, it was called Canadian Direct Financial.
- Canadian Western Financial Ltd. (100% ownership) – mutual fund dealer.
- Canadian Western Trust Company (100% ownership) – personal and corporate trust services. Optimum Mortgage is a division of Canadian Western Trust Company and offers residential mortgages via a network of mortgage brokers.
- National Leasing Group Inc. (100% ownership) – commercial equipment leasing.
- Valiant Trust Company (100% ownership) – specialty trust services including stock transfer, corporate trust, escrow and employee plan services.
- CWB Wealth Management (previously Adroit Investment Management Ltd (76.5% ownership) – investment and wealth management.

=== Motive Financial ===
Motive Financial was the virtual banking division of Canadian Western Bank. As such, eligible deposits were held at Canadian Western Bank, a member of Canada Deposit Insurance Corporation (CDIC). Motive Financial was an online bank.

Motive served customers in all provinces except Quebec. Accounts could be opened online. Deposits and withdrawals could be made using one of the Exchange ATM network’s 2400 ATMs. Debit-card purchases could be made using the Interac network. Transfers to and from other banks could be done by electronic funds transfer (EFT), by Interac e-Transfer, or by writing cheques. Because Motive offered no in-branch services, it offered higher interest rates than conventional banks.

== Membership ==
Canadian Western Bank was a member of the Canada Deposit Insurance Corporation (CDIC). It also belonged to the Cirrus, Interac, Mastercard, and The Exchange interbank networks.

== See also ==
- List of banks and credit unions in Canada
- Canadian Western Bank v Alberta
