= CITV-DT =

Television station in Edmonton

- Edmonton, Alberta; Canada
- Channels: Digital: 13 (VHF); Virtual: 13
- Branding: Global Edmonton (general); Global News (newscasts)

Programming
- Affiliations: Global (since 2000)

Ownership
- Owner: Corus Entertainment; (Corus Television Limited Partnership)
- Sister stations: Radio: CHED, CKNG-FM, CISN-FM

History
- First air date: September 1, 1974
- Former call signs: CITV-TV (1974–2011)
- Former channel numbers: Analogue: 13 (VHF, 1974–2011); Digital: 47 (UHF, 2009–2011)
- Former affiliations: Independent (1974–2000)
- Call sign meaning: Canadian Independent Television

Technical information
- Licensing authority: CRTC
- ERP: 25 kW
- HAAT: 228.1 m (748 ft)
- Transmitter coordinates: 53°22′57″N 113°12′59″W
- Translator(s): see § Rebroadcaster

Links
- Website: Global Edmonton

CITV-DT (channel 13) is a television station in Edmonton, Alberta, Canada, owned and operated by the Global Television Network, a division of Corus Entertainment. The station maintains studios on Allard Way Northwest in the Pleasantview neighbourhood of Edmonton; its transmitter is located just off Highway 21, southeast of the city. CITV-DT carries the full Global network schedule, and its programming is similar to sister stations CICT-DT in Calgary and CISA-DT in Lethbridge.

== History ==
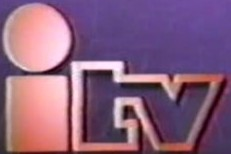
First logo used while as ITV, used during the 1980s.

The station first signed on the air on September 1, 1974. CITV was originally owned by Allarcom, owned by Dr. Charles Allard, and launched under the brand "Independent Television" (ITV). Allard's proposal won out over three competing applicants for a second commercial station in Edmonton because it emphasized local programming.

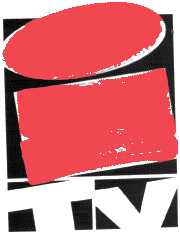
ITV logo used from 1990s until 2000 when CITV joined Global. For logos used as Global, please refer to the Global Television Network article.

In 1981, CITV became a national superstation, being offered on most cable television systems across the country through the Cancom (now Shaw Broadcast Services) service for Canadian cable television providers too distant to receive most over-the-air television signals. It continues to be carried on satellite television nationwide through Bell Satellite TV and Shaw Direct, as well as on several other cable systems across Canada outside Alberta, including in all of Newfoundland and Labrador and some areas of Nova Scotia, New Brunswick, Saskatchewan, British Columbia and the Yukon Territory.

From 1980 to 1982, the station's studios were used for taping episodes of the Canadian sketch comedy SCTV; since the station itself was the focus of the storylines, CITV's lobby and control room were often used for SCTV scenes. (The show had previously taped in Toronto at CIII-TV, Global's flagship station, somewhat ironically.) CITV's booth announcer, Robert Corness, also announced for SCTV, including later syndicated reruns distributed by Allarcom and WIC.

In 1987, the station launched a semi-satellite in Red Deer, Alberta, as part of a joint venture with Monarch Broadcasting (the owners of CKRD-TV). CITV-TV-1, VHF channel 10, broadcast ITV's program schedule, with separate commercials for Red Deer and Central Alberta. The rebroadcaster, along with CKRD-TV, was purchased by Allarcom in 1989. Some programs produced at CKRD-TV's studios were later added to CITV-TV-1's schedule for Central Alberta viewers, such as the noon-hour program ITV Express, and the RDTV News Crew at 5:30 p.m.

In February 1991, Allarcom's broadcast and cable assets, including CITV-TV, were purchased by WIC Western International Communications.

In July 2000, the CRTC approved the purchase of WIC's broadcast television assets, including CITV-TV, by Canwest. CITV officially joined the Canwest-owned Global Television Network on September 4, 2000, along with fellow Alberta stations CICT in Calgary, CISA-TV in Lethbridge, and CKRD-TV in Red Deer. The former WIC stations in Edmonton, Calgary, and Lethbridge had already carried Global's programming, alongside WIC-sourced programming, since 1988.

The CRTC approved Canwest's application to launch a transitional digital television transmitter, CITV-DT, on March 5, 2009. The transmitter launched on June 29, 2009, on UHF channel 47 (virtual channel 13.1).

CITV-TV-1 was converted to a rebroadcaster of CITV-TV/DT in August 2009, relaying Global Edmonton's program schedule and commercials without any variations; this coincided with the closure of CHCA-TV by Canwest.

On October 27, 2010, Canwest Global's television assets, including CITV, were purchased by Shaw Communications. On August 22, 2011, the station completed its transition from analog to digital by moving CITV-DT from UHF channel 47 to VHF channel 13 and increasing its effective radiated power (its virtual channel remains at 13.1).

Corus Entertainment completed its purchase of Shaw Media, including CITV Edmonton, on April 1, 2016.

== News operation ==
CITV presently broadcasts 45 hours of locally produced newscasts each week (with seven hours each weekday and five hours each on Saturdays and Sundays). It currently airs the highest number of local newscast broadcast hours of any English-language television station in the Edmonton market.

The station was the first in the Edmonton market to have a news helicopter. The helicopter, called "Global 1", is shared with radio station CHED for their traffic reports during the Morning News and the Early News. The helicopter is also used frequently for breaking news coverage.

On November 15, 2010, CITV became the first television station in Alberta to begin broadcasting its locally produced programming in high definition. On September 10, 2011, CITV-DT expanded its Saturday morning newscast to three hours. The following day, on September 11, the station debuted a two-hour Sunday morning newscast.

On August 27, 2012, CITV-DT expanded its weekday morning newscast to four hours, with the addition of a half-hour; in addition on September 2, 2012, the station expanded its Sunday morning newscast to three hours with an additional hour. The expansions to CITV's morning news programming was part of a benefits package that was included as a condition of the sale of the Global Television Network to Shaw Communications.

In June 2024, Corus Entertainment enacted cuts in its news division, affecting weekend news programming at Global Edmonton and Global Calgary. As of August 10, 2024, both stations will continue to broadcast separate 6 p.m. and 11 p.m. newscasts for their respective markets; both sets of evening newscasts will utilize a shared on-air presenting team out of the Calgary studios using Global's multi-market newscast production method that is used in other markets. It has also been announced that separate weekend morning newscasts for both stations will be done out of the Global Edmonton studios.

In July 2026, Corus announced layoffs impacting the Global News division, which impacted 28 positions in Alberta; as part of the layoffs, CITV and Calgary sister CICT will both centralize some production of their newscasts out of Toronto. The layoffs included Scott Roberts, who co-hosted of the station's 6 p.m. newscast since 2022.

=== Notable current on-air staff ===
- Angus Watt – business and finance reporter

=== Notable former on-air staff ===
- Rob Brown – reporter (1999–2002)
- Darren Dutchyshen – sports (1987–1995)
- Carolyn Jarvis – reporter (2005–2009)
- Doug Main – anchor (1975–1988)
- Claire Martin – weather (1996–2005)
- Bill Matheson – weather (1976–1999)
- Tara Nelson – reporter
- Graham Richardson – reporter
- Kathy Tomlinson – reporter

== Technical information ==
=== Subchannel ===
Subchannel of CITV-DT
Channel	Res.	Short name	Programming
13.1	1080i	CITV-DT	Global

=== Analogue-to-digital conversion ===
On August 31, 2011, when Canadian television stations in CRTC-designated mandatory markets transitioned from analogue to digital broadcasts, the station's digital signal relocated from channel 47 to VHF channel 13.

=== Rebroadcaster ===
Station	City of licence	Channel	ERP	HAAT	Transmitter coordinates
CITV-DT-1	Red Deer	28 (UHF); 10	132 kW	263.5 m (865 ft)	52°16′35.2″N 113°41′25.3″W
