= Financial Services Regulatory Authority of Ontario =

Crown agency in Ontario, Canada

Coordinates: 43.760917°N 79.414673°W

- Autorité ontarienne de réglementation des services financiers

Agency overview
- Formed: 2016
- Preceding agencies: Financial Services Commission of Ontario; Deposit Insurance Corporation of Ontario
- Type: Crown agency
- Jurisdiction: Government of Ontario
- Headquarters: 25 Sheppard Avenue West, Suite 100 Toronto, Ontario
- Minister responsible: Peter Bethlenfalvy, Minister of Finance
- Agency executives: Dexter John, CEO; Joanne De Laurentiis, Chair
- Key document: Financial Services Regulatory Authority of Ontario Act, 2016
- Website: www.fsrao.ca

The Financial Services Regulatory Authority of Ontario (FSRA; French: Autorité ontarienne de réglementation des services financiers) is a Crown agency which acts as the financial regulator for the Canadian province of Ontario. Established in 2016, the FSRA superseded its two predecessor agencies, the Financial Services Commission of Ontario and the Deposit Insurance Corporation of Ontario on June 8, 2019. The Financial Services Regulatory Authority of Ontario operates at arm's length from the Government of Ontario, and reports to the Legislative Assembly of Ontario through the Minister of Finance.

== Regulated sectors ==
FSRA regulates the insurance, credit union, caisse populaire, mortgage brokerage, loan, trust, and pension administration sectors in Ontario. Additionally it provides deposit insurance for members of provincially-incorporated credit unions and caisses populaires.

== See also ==
- Ontario Securities Commission
- Pension regulation in Canada
- List of financial supervisory authorities by country
