= Accel (interbank network) =

- Operating area: United States
- Members: ±3,100 (U.S.)
- ATMs: ±412,000
- Founded: 1974
- Owner: Fiserv

Accel (formerly known as the ACCEL/Exchange Network) is a North American interbank network owned by Fiserv. It connects over 412,000 automatic teller machines (ATMs) in all 50 states in the United States. The network also has a small number of ATMs in certain U.S. Air Force Bases around the world, and over 3.3 million electronic funds transfer at point-of-sale locations.

== History ==
- 1985: Accel was founded, by major banks in the Northwest of the United States, primarily as an electronic funds transfer network.
- 1991: Accel began a business partnership with the Exchange network creating ACCEL/Exchange.
- In the 1990s most banks in the Pacific Northwest were part of this network including Seafirst Bank/Bank of America, US Bank, First Interstate Bank, Puget Sound Bank, Rainier Bank/Security Pacific, Key Bank and West One Bank. Since then, bank mergers caused some banks to leave the Accel/Exchange network. Now only Key Bank is part of Accel/Exchange when it comes to major banks in the Northwest.
- 2013: In April, the company streamlined the name from "ACCEL/Exchange" to simply "Accel," a result of a repositioning of the debit payment network, and a reflection of its current "ability to accelerate funds transfers across retail, biller and social person-to-person payments.

== The Exchange Network ==
THE EXCHANGE Network
- Operating area: Canada
- Members: 140
- ATMs: 3,300
- Founded: 2000
- Owner: FICANEX

Accel's Canadian counterpart, known as THE EXCHANGE Network (and stylized as THE EXCHANGE), is operated by FICANEX, a limited partnership of several Canadian banks and credit unions which licenses "THE EXCHANGE" branding and intellectual property from Fiserv. THE EXCHANGE Network includes nearly 3,300 ATMs serving customers of roughly 140 financial institutions—primarily credit unions and online banks but also including smaller bank such as the National Bank of Canada. THE EXCHANGE Network is not used for debit payment processing in Canada, as most Canadian debit cards use the Interac network for EFTPOS debit transaction, but most EXCHANGE debit cards can be used for debit purchases through the Accel network in the United States.
