= List of University of Alberta people =

This is a list of distinguished people affiliated with the University of Alberta.

== Current faculty ==
- Ali A. Abdi – anthropologist and author; education and international development
- Jordan Abel – poet
- John Acorn – naturalist and science communicator
- William Anselmi – professor of Italian and Italian-Canadian literature and culture
- Florence Ashley – law professor, first openly transfeminine clerk of the Supreme Court of Canada
- Lorne Babiuk – immunologist and virologist
- Harold Barclay – anthropologist
- Howard Bashaw – composer
- Norman C. Beaulieu – electrical engineer
- Ted Bishop – English professor
- Stan Boutin – wildlife population ecologist
- Mark Boyce – wildlife population ecologist
- Ludwig N. Carbyn – wolf biologist
- D. Jean Clandinin – education researcher
- Kerry Courneya – kinesiologist
- Philip J. Currie – palaeontologist
- Patricia Demers – English professor
- Jaroslaw Drelich – chemical engineer
- Marilyn Dumont – poet
- Janet A. W. Elliott – distinguished professor, faculty of engineering
- Andrew Gow – historian of medieval and early modern Europe
- Jonathan Locke Hart – author, literary scholar and historian
- Peter Hide – sculptor
- John-Paul Himka – historian of Eastern Europe
- Greg Hollingshead – novelist and professor of English
- Michael Houghton – Nobel laureate, co-discoverer of hepatitis C
- Tasha Hubbard – filmmaker and scholar of Indigenous studies
- Peter L. Hurd – biologist
- Karim Jamal – business professor
- Stephen A. Kent – sociologist
- Conor Kerr – novelist and poet
- Jacobus Kloppers – organist
- Natalie Kononenko – folklorist
- Andrew Leach – energy economist
- Mark A. Lewis – mathematical ecologist and the Canada Research Chair in Mathematical Biology at the Centre for Mathematical Biology
- Michael Lounsbury – associate dean of Research, Thornton A. Graham Chair and professor of strategic management, organizations and sociology
- Chloë Lum and Yannick Desranleau – visual artists and former members of the band AIDS Wolf
- Austin Mardon – adjunct professor, recipient of Order of Canada
- Jacob Masliyah – pioneer researcher in oil-sands extraction, recipient of Order of Canada
- Takahiko Masuda – psychologist
- Iman Mersal – poet, professor of Arabic literature and Middle Eastern and African studies
- Robert Moody – mathematician, co-inventor of Kac–Moody algebra
- Adam Morton – philosopher and member of the Royal Society of Canada
- Don Page – theoretical cosmologist
- Raj Pannu – sociologist, former head of the Alberta New Democratic Party
- Graham Pearson – geologist
- Mike Percy – economist
- Leonard Ratzlaff – professor of choral music
- Jia Rongqing – mathematician
- Arturo Sanchez-Azofeifa – director of the university's Center for Earth Observation Sciences
- Jonathan Schaeffer – computer scientist and the Canada Research Chair in Artificial Intelligence
- James Shapiro – professor of surgery, medicine and surgical oncology; director of the Clinical Islet Transplant Program; leader of the team that developed the Edmonton protocol
- Arya Mitra Sharma – Alberta Health Services endowed Chair in Obesity Research and Management
- Felix Sperling – entomologist
- Toby Spribille – lichenologist
- Richard S. Sutton – computer scientist and Turing Award winner
- Frank Sysyn – historian of Eastern Europe
- Kim TallBear – professor of native studies
- Darren Tanke – palaeontologist
- Ban Tsui – professor of anesthesiology and pain medicine
- D. Lorne Tyrrell – infectious disease physician
- Allan Warrack – Department of Marketing, Business Economics and Law in the Faculty of Business; also serves as associate dean of the Master of Public Management Program and vice-president of Administration
- Lana Whiskeyjack – artist and scholar of gender, sexuality, and Indigenous identity
- Rudy Wiebe – novelist, two-time Governor General's Award-winner
- Douglas Wiens – statistician
- David S. Wishart – computational biologist
- Toshifumi Yokota – medical geneticist
- Osmar R. Zaiane – computer scientist
- Vaclav Zizler – mathematician

== Past faculty ==
- Ibrahim M. Abu-Rabi‘ – Islamic scholar
- Jane Alexander – Anglican bishop
- Violet Archer – composer and performer
- Margaret-Ann Armour – chemist, supporter of women in science and engineering, member of the Order of Canada
- Margaret Atwood – author of The Handmaid's Tale and many other novels, poetry collections, and works of criticism; two-time Booker Prize winner
- George Ball – entomologist
- Henry Beissel – poet and playwright
- C. Fred Bentley – soil scientist
- Stanford Blade – agronomist
- Edward D. Blodgett – author and researcher in comparative literature, religion and film/media
- Russell Brown – professor of law, justice of the Supreme Court of Canada
- Donald Cameron – academic administrator and member of the Senate of Canada
- Clive Carruthers – classicist
- Karl Clark – chemist and oil sands researcher
- Jagannath Prasad Das – educational psychologist; member of the Order of Canada
- James DeFelice – theatre professor
- John B. Dossetor – professor emeritus of medicine and bioethics
- Pierre Flor-Henry – psychologist
- Robert Folinsbee – geologist
- Malcolm Forsyth – composer; Juno Award winner and member of the Order of Canada
- John Gamon – plant physiologist and Earth observation scientist, developer of the Photochemical Reflectance Index
- Victor Golla – linguist and anthropologist
- Thomas B. Greenfield – scholar of educational administration
- Allan Gregg – pollster and political advisor
- Ronald Hamowy – libertarian intellectual
- W. G. Hardy – classicist, writer, ice hockey administrator, member of the Order of Canada
- H. A. Hargreaves – science fiction writer
- Walter Edgar Harris – analytical chemist
- Douglas Haynes – abstract artist
- Myer Horowitz – early childhood education scholar, president of the University of Alberta
- Werner Israel – professor of physics and leader in the theory of black holes; Fellow of the Royal Society and Royal Society of Canada
- George Ivany – president of the University of Saskatchewan
- Martin Joos – linguist
- William Alexander Robb Kerr – president of the University of Alberta
- Mors Kochanski – bushcraft and wilderness survival pioneer
- Henry Kreisel – novelist and essayist
- Karol Józef Krótki – demographer who helped establish the Population Research Laboratory, Fellow of the Royal Society of Canada
- Gérard Vincent La Forest – dean of law (1968–1970), past justice of the Supreme Court of Canada
- Raymond U. Lemieux – chemistry pioneer, winner of the Wolf Prize in Chemistry (1999) and the Albert Einstein World Award of Science (1992)
- Francis John Lewis – botanist
- Andy Liu – mathematician
- Dorothy Livesay – poet, two-time winner of Governor General's Award
- John M. MacEachran – psychologist, proponent of eugenics
- Walter Mackenzie – surgeon
- Barry J. Mailloux – computer scientist
- Eli Mandel – poet, winner of a Governor General's Award
- Anne McLellan – law professor, former deputy prime minister of Canada and holder of multiple other Cabinet positions
- Carlo Montemagno – bionanotechnologist, winner of the Feynman Prize in Nanotechnology
- Norbert Morgenstern – geotechnical engineer
- Leo Moser – geometer and discrete mathematician
- Angus Munn – soldier and anesthesiologist
- Joseph S. Nelson – ichthyologist
- Hope A. Olson – library scientist
- John Orrell – theatre historian who advised the reconstruction of Shakespeare's Globe
- Jim Parr – metallurgist, broadcaster, and composer
- Solomiia Pavlychko – literary critic
- Graham Peacock – abstract painter
- Anatol Roshko – physicist, one of only three people alive to have a dimensionless number (Roshko number) named after them
- George A. Rothrock – European historian
- David Schindler – limnologist, winner of the Volvo Environment Prize and the Tyler Prize for Environmental Achievement
- Stephen Scobie – poet
- Gail Sidonie Sobat – writer and educator
- Ian Stirling – Arctic ecologist
- Mathukumalli V. Subbarao – number theorist
- David Suzuki – zoologist, environmental activist, and science communicator
- Morris Swadesh – pioneer of lexicostatistics and creator of the Swadesh list
- Yasushi Takahashi – physicist, co-discoverer of the Ward–Takahashi identity
- Henry Marshall Tory – first president of the University of Alberta, founder of three universities, the Alberta Research Council and National Research Council of Canada
- Thomas Thundat – Canada Excellence Research Chair in Oilsands Molecular Engineering
- Nicole Tomczak-Jaegermann – mathematician
- Hiroomi Umezawa – physicist
- Maury Van Vliet – physical education scholar
- Ludwig von Bertalanffy – theoretical biologist who helped establish the Advanced Center for Theoretical Psychology, originator of General Systems Theory and creator of the Von Bertalanffy function
- Ella May Walker – visual artist and writer
- Sheila Watson – novelist, author of The Double Hook
- Wilfred Watson – poet and dramatist
- Thaddeus E. Weckowicz – psychologist
- John Alexander Weir – first dean of Law
- Daniel Woolf – historian
- Norman Yates – painter

== Alumni ==
=== Academics ===
- Dominique Abrioux – president of Athabasca University (1995–2005)
- Charlene Bearhead – first educational lead at the National Centre for Truth and Reconciliation at the University of Manitoba
- Sir John Bell – Regius Chair of Medicine, University of Oxford
- Andrew Brook – Chancellor's Professor of Philosophy and Cognitive Science at Carleton University
- Tania Bubela – professor and dean in the Faculty of Health Sciences at Simon Fraser University
- Franco Romano Calaresu (1931–1996) – professor of neurophysiology, University of Western Ontario
- James Collip – biochemistry professor, played key role in discovery of insulin
- Jim Cummins – professor and author, Ontario Institute for Studies in Education
- Bernadette Louise Dean – principal of Kinnaird College, Pakistan
- J. Alan George – computer scientist
- Su Guaning – president of Nanyang Technological University
- Aja Huang – Google Deep Mind; with David Silver, a main researcher of AlphaGo
- Joy Johnson – vice-president, Research, Simon Fraser University
- Charles Lee – cytogeneticist
- Raymond U. Lemieux – chemistry pioneer, winner of the Wolf Prize in Chemistry (1999) and the Albert Einstein World Award of Science (1992)
- Jacqueline P. Leighton – educational psychologist, academic and author
- Tak Wah Mak – molecular biologist
- Joseph B. Martin – dean of Harvard Medical School
- Ravi S. Menon – Canadian-American biophysicist and professor The University of Western Ontario
- Martin P. Mintchev – bioengineering academic and inventor
- Piers Nash – cancer research professor at the University of Chicago and founder of Sympatic
- Jordan B. Peterson – media commentator, clinical psychologist, and former professor at the University of Toronto
- Joseph Pivato – writer and researcher in ethnic minority writing in Canada; professor, Athabasca University, Edmonton
- Noris Salazar Allen – Panamanian bryologist
- Prafullachandra Vishnu Sane – plant physiologist
- David Silver – principal research scientist at Google Deep Mind; with Aja Huang, a main researcher of AlphaGo
- Janice Stein – international relations researcher
- Wallace Sterling – past president of Stanford University
- Richard E. Taylor – high-energy physicist, winner of the 1990 Nobel Prize in Physics
- Zoe Todd – anthropologist and Indigenous scholar
- Satish K. Tripathi – president of University at Buffalo
- Bas van Fraassen – philosopher of science, developer of constructive empiricism
- Kristopher Wells – scholar of gender and sexuality at MacEwan University and senator

=== Authors ===
- Jordan Abel
- Daniel Arnold
- Todd Babiak
- Billy-Ray Belcourt
- Gary Botting
- Norma Dunning
- Caterina Edwards
- Edmundo Farolan
- Katherine Govier
- Karen Graham – dietitian
- Medina Hahn
- Emma Hooper
- Myrna Kostash
- Arthur Kroeger
- Robert Kroetsch
- Steve Lillebuen
- Suzette Mayr
- Wendy McGrath
- W. O. Mitchell
- Premee Mohamed
- Marie Moser
- Mieko Ouchi
- Kit Pearson
- Marguerite-A. Primeau
- Pierrette Requier
- Emily Riddle
- Candace Savage
- Lesley-Anne Scorgie
- Vivek Shraya
- Timothy Taylor
- Vern Thiessen
- Brian Tracy
- Aritha Van Herk
- Matthew James Weigel
- Rudy Wiebe

=== Judges ===
- Adam Germain – justice of the Court of King’s Bench of Alberta (retired), member of the Legislative Assembly of Alberta (retired)
- Joe Kryczka – past justice of the Court of King’s Bench of Alberta, president of the Canadian Amateur Hockey Association
- Ronald Martland – past justice of the Supreme Court of Canada
- Beverley McLachlin – chief justice of Canada
- Henry Grattan Nolan – past justice of the Supreme Court of Canada
- William Stevenson – past justice of the Supreme Court of Canada
- Allan Wachowich – past chief justice of the Court of Queen's Bench of Alberta (retired)
- Edward R. Wachowich – past chief judge of the Provincial Court of Alberta (deceased 2012)

=== Politicians ===
- Rona Ambrose – minister of Intergovernmental Affairs
- Pat Binns – former premier of Prince Edward Island
- Joe Clark – former prime minister of Canada
- Charles Dent – former cabinet minister of the Northwest Territories
- David Emerson – Minister of International Trade
- David Hancock – former premier of Alberta and minister of Education of Alberta
- Lou Hyndman – former Alberta cabinet minister
- Don Iveson – former Mayor of Edmonton
- Matt Jeneroux – member of Parliament for Edmonton Riverbend, former MLA
- Andrew Knack – mayor of Edmonton
- J. Wilton Littlechild – former member of Parliament
- Peter Lougheed – former premier of Alberta
- Preston Manning – former leader of the Reform Party of Canada, and founder of two Canadian political parties
- Greg McLean – member of Parliament for Calgary Centre
- Heather McPherson – member of Parliament for Edmonton Strathcona
- Roland Michener – former governor general
- Grant Notley – former member of the Legislative Assembly of Alberta and leader of the Alberta NDP
- Rachel Notley – former premier of Alberta
- Chantal Petitclerc – wheelchair racer and Canadian senator for Quebec
- Jim Prentice – former premier of Alberta and minister of Environment
- Jan Reimer – first female mayor of Edmonton
- R.J. Simpson – premier of the Northwest Territories
- Ed Stelmach – former premier of Alberta (attended, did not graduate)
- Jane Sterk – former leader of the Green Party of British Columbia
- Claudette Tardif – Canadian senator for Alberta, deputy leader of the opposition in the Senate of Canada
- Muriel Stanley Venne (1937–2024) – Canadian Métis community leader and Indigenous rights activist

=== Other notable alumni ===
- Greg Abel – CEO of Berkshire Hathaway
- Harry Ainlay – educational administrator, three-term mayor of Edmonton, namesake of Harry Ainlay High School
- Doris Anderson – editor and rights activist
- Anil Arora – former chief statistician of Canada
- Peggy Baker – dancer and choreographer
- Allan Gordon Bell – composer
- Nereo Bolzon – football player
- Rachelle Brown – curler
- Ron Butlin – ice hockey executive
- Clarence Campbell – former National Hockey League president
- Neil Campbell – discovered gold in Yellowknife
- Lorne Cardinal – actor
- Juan Chioran – voice and stage actor at the Stratford Festival
- Joel H. Cohen – Canadian-Jewish comedy writer for The Simpsons
- Ted Corday – soap opera creator (Days of Our Lives)
- Ernest Côté – soldier, diplomat and civil servant
- Joanne Courtney – curler
- Jim Coutts – political advisor
- Chris Craddock – actor, playwright, and filmmaker
- John Demco – internet pioneer
- Clare Drake – ice hockey coach in CIS history, inducted to the Hockey Hall of Fame in 2017
- Nicole Dunsdon – the last person to win the Miss Canada competition before it was cancelled
- Bernard Ebbers – Worldcom co-founder and CEO; briefly attended the university
- William Epstein –- international expert on disarmament who worked at the United Nations
- Tim Feehan – songwriter
- Dana Ferguson – curler
- Nathan Fillion – actor
- Andrew French – abstract sculptor
- Jay Gilday – singer-songwriter
- Allan Gilliland – composer
- Patrick Gilmore – actor
- Lisa Gilroy – comedian
- Randy Gregg – former National Hockey League player and medical researcher
- Paul Gross – actor
- Ted Harrison – painter and illustrator
- Ivan Head – former policy adviser of Prime Minister Pierre Trudeau
- Violet King Henry – first black woman lawyer in Canada
- Rachel Homan – World Champion curler
- Casey Hudson – video game producer, known for directing the Mass Effect trilogy and Star Wars: Knights of the Old Republic
- Roger Hui – co-creator of J programming language
- Adam Johnson – orchestra conductor
- Daryl Katz – billionaire entrepreneur, owner of the Rexall Pharmacy chain and the Edmonton Oilers
- Lewis Kay – scientist
- Marc Kennedy – curler
- Cindy Kenny-Gilday – Sahtu environmentalist and activist for Indigenous rights in Canada
- Lylian Klimek – sculptor
- Eric Allan Kramer – character actor, most notable in the role of Bob Duncan in Good Luck Charlie
- Joseph Kubanek – American psychiatrist
- Melina Laboucan-Massimo – climate justice and Indigenous rights advocate
- Mick Lizmore – curler, head coach of Canada's National Wheelchair Curling Program
- Melissa Lotholz – bobsledder
- Thomas Rockwell Mackie – medical physicist, inventor of tomotherapy
- Ken Macklin – sculptor
- Glenna Matoush – visual artist
- Conor McNally – documentary filmmaker
- Kelsey Mitchell – Olympic gold model track cyclist and bobsledder
- Shelley Moore – special education expert
- Ray Muzyka – BioWare co-founder
- Sidney Richard Carlyle Nelson – Canadian air marshal for the RAF
- Tom Radford – documentary filmmaker
- Jan Randall – composer and musician
- Daniel K. Riskin – evolutionary biologist and co-host of Daily Planet
- Joseph H. Shoctor – real estate developer, co-founder of the Citadel Theatre
- George Stanley – designer of the Canadian flag
- Robert Steadward – former International Paralympic Committee president
- Olawale Sulaiman – neurosurgeon, philanthropist and academic
- Esther Tailfeathers – physician and Indigenous health expert
- William Thorsell – editor, The Globe and Mail; director, the Royal Ontario Museum
- Malorie Urbanovitch – fashion designer
- Jean Wallbridge – architect
- Lorne Warneke – psychiatrist and LGBTQ+ advocate
- Anne Wheeler – film director
- Dayo Wong Tze-Hwa (黃子華) – Hong Kong comedian, actor, singer-songwriter and screenwriter; pioneered Cantonese stand up comedy
- Suzie Wong (蘇施黃) – Hong Kong disk jockey and television cooking program host
- Greg Zeschuk – BioWare co-founder
- Jason Zuback – golfer; five-time world long drive champion

=== Rhodes Scholars ===
The University of Alberta has produced 76 Rhodes Scholars, including the following:

- Roland Michener (1919) – 20th governor general of Canada
- George Stanley (1929) – designer of the Canadian flag
- Arthur Kroeger (1956) – academic, federal deputy minister and chancellor of Carleton University
- Billy-Ray Belcourt (2016) – first First Nations Rhodes Scholar, poet and winner of the Griffin Poetry Prize

== Honorary degree recipients ==
- His Highness the Aga Khan – spiritual leader of the Ismaili Muslims
- Douglas Cardinal – architect
- Victor Cavendish – former governor general of Canada
- Charles III
- Jean Chrétien – former prime minister of Canada
- John Diefenbaker – former prime minister of Canada
- King Edward VIII
- Randy Gregg – former National Hockey League and Olympic hockey player, physician and philanthropist
- Wayne Gretzky – former National Hockey League player
- Horace Harvey – second chief justice of Alberta; chairman of the University of Alberta Board of Governors
- Frederick Haultain – first and only premier of Canada's North-West Territories
- Lois Hole – former lieutenant governor of Alberta
- Ernest Manning – former premier of Alberta
- Don Mazankowski – former deputy prime minister of Canada
- Walter Murray – first president of the University of Saskatchewan
- Alexander Rutherford – first premier of Alberta
- Arthur Sifton – former premier of Alberta
- Manmohan Singh – former prime minister of India
- Donald Smith – 1st Baron Strathcona and Mount Royal
- Donna Strickland – Nobel Prize in Physics winner
- Harry Strom – former premier of Alberta
- Mother Teresa – missionary
- Pierre Trudeau – former prime minister of Canada
- Desmond Tutu – former archbishop of Cape Town and current chair of the Global Elders
- Max Ward – pioneering aviator
