= Minesh Mehta =

American physician

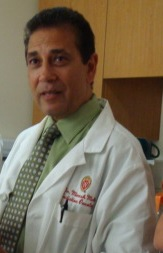
- Born: December 14, 1957 (age 68); Mbarara, Uganda
- Scientific career
- Fields: Radiation Oncology; Neuro Oncology; Thoracic Oncology
- Institutions: University of Maryland; Northwestern University; University of Wisconsin-Madison; RTOG

Minesh Prafulchandra Mehta (born December 14, 1957) is an American radiation oncologist and physician-scientist of Indian origin and Ugandan birth. He is currently deputy director and chief of radiation oncology at Miami Cancer Institute at Baptist Health South Florida.

== Early life and career ==
Mehta was born in Uganda to two teachers from India. After moving to Zambia, he completed high school and enrolled in the pre-medical curriculum, graduating with a bachelor's degree in human biology from the University of Zambia. He also completed medical school at the University of Zambia (1981). After completing his internship and a year of residency training, he completed a residency at the University of Wisconsin (1988). After completing his residency training, he joined the department of human oncology, University of Wisconsin School of Medicine and Public Health, Madison as an assistant professor, eventually becoming a tenured professor and department chair as well as chief resident in radiation oncology. While at Wisconsin, he received the Eric Wolfe Professorship of Human Oncology (2007).

His work at Wisconsin included the scientific and clinical implementation of image-guided intensity modulated radiotherapy, overseeing the development of translational programs combining radiotherapy with targeted agents integrating advanced imaging. This period also included his leadership of the brain tumor committee of the Radiation Therapy Oncology Group (RTOG). This committee completed the largest ever randomized trial in Glioblastoma, incorporating patient-specific, advanced-imaging, molecular, and cognitive/quality-of-life endpoints.

Additionally, through his work in the RTOG and other clinical trial mechanisms he was involved in setting standards in clinical research on brain metastases through a series of multicenter, international, randomized trials, resulting in neurologic and neurocognitive dataset collection and evaluation for this condition. He developed a statewide network of radiotherapy centers allied to the University and began working in the area of cancer disparities in underserved populations, pursuing survey, epidemiologic, interventional, and translational research in this field. In 2007 he focused on brain and thoracic tumor clinical trials, as well as resident, national, and international education.

In 2010 he resigned from his position at the University of Wisconsin, after a potential conflict of interest investigation began into his consultancy work for TomoTherapy Inc.

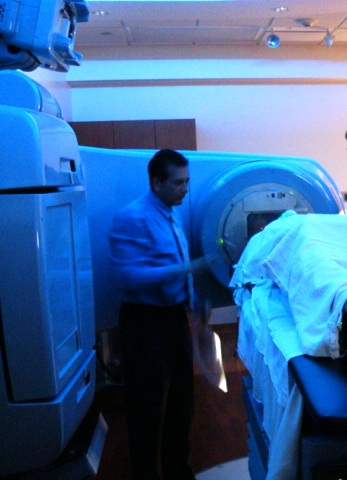

Until 2013, Mehta was at Robert H. Lurie Comprehensive Cancer Center of Northwestern University in Chicago, where he was co-director of the radiation oncology residency training program. He has designed and led national and international clinical studies, receiving NIH and NCI grants for his research in brain and central nervous system tumors.

Before coming to Baptist Health South Florida in 2016, Mehta served as medical director of the Maryland Proton Treatment Center at University of Maryland School of Medicine in Baltimore, launching the area’s first proton treatment center.

== Scientific career and publications ==
Together with Thomas Rockwell Mackie, Mehta developed a form of radiation treatment known as tomotherapy. His scientific career has included work in the area of evidence-based medicine through clinical and translational research, including areas such as endobronchial brachytherapy, radioimmunotherapy, stereotactic radiosurgery, fractionated stereotactic radiotherapy, image-guided and intensity-modulated radiotherapy, radioprotectors, radiosensitizers, altered fractionation, combination chemoradiotherapy as well as combining targeted agents with radiotherapy. He has run numerous multimodality clinical trials for both adult and pediatric CNS neoplasms. Current areas include developing molecularly-targeted agents as radiosensitizers for thoracic and CNS tumors. Mehta has authored almost 100 book chapters and published more than 800 scientific papers and abstracts.

== Awards and honors ==
As a professor at the University of Wisconsin, Mehta was the Eric Wolfe Professor of Human Oncology (2007). Mehta was also recognized as a fellow of the American Society for Radiation Oncology (2009).

== Personal life ==
Mehta's son, Tej Mehta, is a captain in the United States Air Force and a physician completing residency in vascular and interventional radiology at the Johns Hopkins Hospital.
