= Shelley Moore (disambiguation) =

Shelley Moore or Shelly Moore may be:

- Shelley Moore, 1932-2016, English-American singer
- Shelley Moore Capito, born 1953, United States Senator from West Virginia
- Shelley Moore (educator), Canadian educator
- Shelly Moore, born 1978, American beauty queen
