= Takahiko =

- Gender: Male

Origin
- Origin: Japanese
- Meaning: Different meanings depending on the kanji used

Takahiko (written: 崇彦, 孝彦, 貴彦, 隆彦 or 恭彦) is a masculine Japanese given name. Notable people with the name include:

- Iimura Takahiko (飯村 隆彦; born 1937), Japanese film director
- Takahiko Kozuka (小塚 崇彦; born 1989), Japanese figure skater
- Takahiko Masuda (増田 貴彦), Japanese psychologist
- Takahiko Nomaguchi (野間口 貴彦; born 1983), Japanese baseball player
- Maruyama Takahiko (丸山 孝彦; born 1946), Japanese sumo wrestler
- Takahiko Sumida (住田 貴彦; born 1991), Japanese footballer
- Takahiko Yamanouchi (山内 恭彦; 1902–1986), Japanese physicist
