= Sherita Hill Golden =

American physician

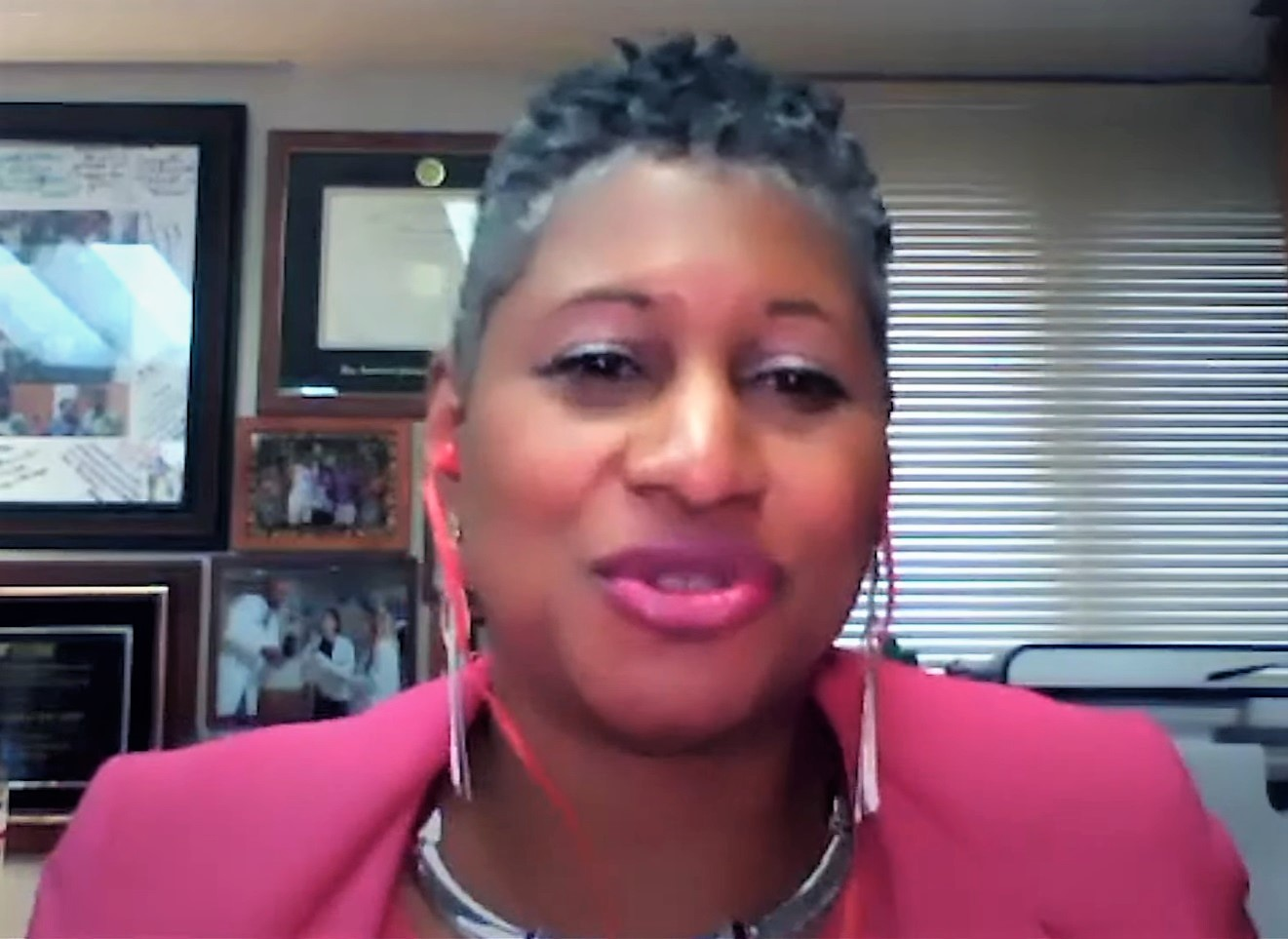
- Golden in 2021
- Education: Johns Hopkins University; University of Virginia School of Medicine; University of Maryland, College Park
- Scientific career
- Workplaces: Johns Hopkins University

Sherita Hill Golden is an American physician-scientist who is the Hugh P. McCormick Family Professor of Endocrinology and Metabolism at Johns Hopkins University. She holds joint appointments in the Welch Center for Prevention, Epidemiology, and Clinical Research, in the Department of Epidemiology at the Johns Hopkins Bloomberg School of Public Health, in the Armstrong Institute for Patient Safety and Quality, and in the Center for Health Equity. Her research considers biological and systems influences on diabetes and its outcomes. From 2015-2019, she served as the inaugural executive vice-chair of the department of medicine and from 2019-2024, she served as the vice president and chief diversity officer for Johns Hopkins Medicine. She was elected Fellow of National Academy of Medicine in 2021.

== Early life and education ==
Golden is from Maryland. She was an undergraduate at the University of Maryland, College Park, which she graduated summa cum laude. She moved to the University of Virginia School of Medicine for her medical degree, and graduated a member Alpha Omega Alpha. She was the first African-American to be awarded the C. Richard Bowman Scholarship for clinical excellence. Whilst she had originally intended to become a paediatrician, she was inspired by a diabetes expert at Virginia to change her specialty to internal medicine and endocrinology. At the time, diabetes was a growing public health epidemic, and Golden became concerned by the physical and mental impacts of diabetes and its complications. She trained in internal medicine and endocrinology at the Johns Hopkins University School of Medicine, where she simultaneously completed a Master of Health Science degree in Clinical Epidemiology. She was elected to the Delta Omega society at the Johns Hopkins Bloomberg School of Public Health.

== Research and career ==
An internationally recognized physician-scientist and member of the National Academy of Medicine, the Association of American Physicians, and the American Society of Clinical Investigation, Golden’s epidemiological research interests focus on two areas: (1) endogenous sex hormones as risk factors for CVD, type 2 diabetes, and insulin resistance in post-menopausal women and (2) mental health complications of diabetes and the biological, hormonal, and behavioral factors that might explain these associations . She was the first to demonstrate the connection between depression and diabetes, i.e. suffering from depression made a person more likely to suffer from diabetes, and having diabetes predicted risk of developing depression.

Golden co-authored a study titled Emotional Distress Predicts Reduced Type 2 Diabetes Treatment Adherence in the Glycemia Reduction Approaches in Diabetes: A Comparative Effectiveness Study (GRADE). This study highlighted a new view on diabetes showing how emotional distress negatively impacts treatment adherence in patients with type 2 diabetes which emphasized the importance of addressing psychological factors to improve diabetes care outcomes. Golden’s health services research focuses on understanding and eliminating diabetes health disparities and implementing and evaluating systems interventions to improve patient safety and quality of care in hospitalized patients with diabetes . She served as Director of the Johns Hopkins Hospital Inpatient Glucose Management Program from 2003 to 2018.

As executive-vice chair for the Department of Medicine at Johns Hopkins, Golden oversaw a team of 14 vice and associate chairs in executing the tripartite mission of clinical care, research, and education. She worked with her local community to address the needs identified during the unrest that followed the 2015 death of Freddie Gray. This included establishing evidence-based practices for staff and community engagement in the Department of Medicine, as well as Journeys in Medicine speaker series, which became a major department-wide civic engagement initiative. She was elected to the board of the American Diabetes Association in 2018. and served until 2021.

Johns Hopkins Medicine asked Golden to serve as the vice president and chief diversity officer, followed by an official appointment in 2019. She had many celebrated achievements in this role, including leadership around health equity and access during the COVID-19 pandemic. During her tenure, Golden advanced a more focused strategic action plan to guide diversity, inclusion, and health equity initiatives for the school of medicine and health system. She oversaw the expansion of important efforts to recruit and retain diverse talent across Johns Hopkins Medicine (JHM). Under her leadership, JHM system-wide Employee Resource Groups expanded from three to seven and the Achievers Award Program, which recognizes exemplary individuals across JHM in their respective heritage months, was launched. Golden led efforts with the Armstrong Institute for Patient Safety and Quality and the Office of Population Health to develop JHM health equity strategies that meet both federal, state, and Joint Commission requirements to identify and reduce health disparities in both inpatient and outpatient settings. Golden is a leader in the national discussion advancing health equity, including supporting Maryland legislators in drafting and testifying in support of state-level health equity policy. In her advocacy work, she has highlighted the structural inequalities that impact the treatment of ethnic and socioeconomically minoritized populations. In the United States, these populations often live in less well-resourced communities than their white counterparts. She has called for more farmers markets, opportunities to order healthy foods at libraries and more traditional grocery stores in deprived communities. Golden has also called for healthcare providers to engage in anti-oppression and unconscious bias education to support equitable healthcare delivery.

On January 11, 2024, Golden released a 'Diversity Digest' newsletter, which included a statement that "White people, able bodied people, heterosexuals, cisgendered people, males, Christians, middle or owning class people, middle aged people, and English-speakers" in the United States are “privileged”. Following widespread backlash precipitated by an employee sharing the message publicly, Golden apologized the next morning for sending an overly simplistic message, and she publicly retracted and disavowed her summary of social privilege. A Johns Hopkins Medicine spokesperson stated: "The January edition of the monthly newsletter from the Johns Hopkins Medicine Office of Diversity, Inclusion and Health Equity used language that contradicts the values of Johns Hopkins as an institution. Johns Hopkins Medicine employees and students supported Dr. Sherita Golden and expressed disappointment with her co-leadership's response. Golden resigned her position as vice president and chief diversity officer on March 5, 2024.

Golden continues to serve as the Principal Investigator of the Johns Hopkins site of the Diabetes Prevention Program Outcome Study, a role she has held since 2010. She recently completed service on the National Academy of Sciences, Engineering, and Medicine Committee on Assessment of NIH Research on Women's Health.

== Awards and honors ==
- 2013 Elected member of the American Society for Clinical Investigation
- 2015 Innovations in Clinical Care Award
- 2015 American Diabetes Association Diabetes Hero Award
- 2017 Elected Member of the Association of American Physicians
- 2017 University of Virginia Walter Reed Distinguished Achievement Award
- 2018 Annual Women Worth Watching Award
- 2019 University of Virginia Distinguished Alumna Award
- 2020 Maryland Top 100 Woman
- 2021 Baltimore Sun 25 Woman to Watch
- 2021 Elected member of the National Academy of Medicine
- 2022 President’s Award from the University of Maryland Alumni Association
- 2023 Trailblazer in Diversity, Equity, Inclusion and Accessibility

== Selected publications ==
- Selvin, Elizabeth; Spyridon Marinopoulos; Gail Berkenblit; Tejal Rami; Frederick L Brancati; Neil R Powe; Hill, Sherita (2004). "Meta-analysis: glycosylated hemoglobin and cardiovascular disease in diabetes mellitus". Annals of Internal Medicine. 141 (6): 421–431. doi:10.7326/0003-4819-141-6-200409210-00007. PMID 15381515. Wikidata Q35894298.
- Ann Marie McNeill; Wayne D Rosamond; Cynthia J Girman; Sherita Hill Golden; Schmidt, Maria Inês; Honey E East; Ballantyne, Christie; Gerardo Heiss (2005). "The metabolic syndrome and 11-year risk of incident cardiovascular disease in the atherosclerosis risk in communities study". Diabetes Care. 28 (2): 385–390. doi:10.2337/diacare.28.2.385. PMID 15677797. Wikidata Q42646355.
- Hill, Sherita; Lazo, Mariana; Carnethon, Mercedes R.; Bertoni, Alain; Pamela J Schreiner; Diez, Ana Victoria; Hochang Benjamin Lee; Constantine Lyketsos (2008). "Examining a bidirectional association between depressive symptoms and diabetes". JAMA. 299 (23): 2751–2759. doi:10.1001/jama.299.23.2751. PMC 2648841. PMID 18560002. Wikidata Q37111643.

== Personal life ==
Golden is married to Christopher Golden, Director of the Newborn Nursery and Professor of Paediatrics at the Johns Hopkins School of Medicine. Together they have one son.
