= Marguerite-A. Primeau =

Franco-Albertan writer (1914–2011)

Marguerite-A. Primeau (1914–2011) was a Franco-Albertan writer who spent most of her writing career in Vancouver.

== Personal life ==
Primeau was born in St. Paul, Alberta in 1914. She was raised in a devoutly Catholic milieu and attended a convent school, from which she was expelled for reading novels outside of designated hours.

Primeau served as a teacher for 10 years before enrolling at University of Alberta in Edmonton in 1943, where she came under the influence of writers like Simone de Beauvoir and Colette. In 1948, she submitted her master's thesis, which was the first French-language thesis at the university. In 1954, she moved to Vancouver upon receiving a post teaching Romance languages at University of British Columbia. She eventually retired from the university in 1979, but continued to write. She died in 2011, at the age of 97 years.

== Writing career ==
Primeau began writing fiction in the late 1950s, starting work on her first novels Dans le muskeg (In the Muskeg) and Maurice Dufault, sous-directeur (Maurice Dufault, Vice-principal) around this time. Dans le muskeg appeared in 1960. It concerns a schoolteacher from Montreal, Joseph Lormier, who takes a post in a Francophone village in northern Alberta. After an English-speaking Irish merchant saves the village during an economic crisis, the teacher begins to fear the growing influence of English. The teacher also falls in love with a Métis woman named Antoinette Bolduc but declines to marry her, causing him to bear a lifelong regret.

While the manuscript had been completed much earlier, Maurice Dufault, sous-directeur only appeared in 1983 after a troubled and winding publication process. E. D. Blodgett was a major advocate for its publication; he wrote a preface to the original version that was declined by the publisher, but was much later invited to write the preface for its English version, translated by Maureen Ranson. The novel concerns an embittered, middle-aged schoolteacher who is diagnosed with a terminal illness. He proposes to marry the pregnant and desperate sister of one of his Polish students, which begins to rouse in him a sense of social responsibility that transforms his life.

Primeau's third novel, Sauvage-Sauvageon (published in 1984), won the Prix Champlain for works written by Francophones from or living in Canada outside of Quebec. She followed this novel with two collections of stories: Le Totem (The Totem), published in 1988, and Ol' Man, Ol' Dog et l'enfant et autres nouvelles (Ol' Man, Ol' Dog, and the Kid and Other Stories), published in 1996 with an expanded second edition released in 2004.

== Legacy ==
Primeau is widely considered to be among the most important Francophone writers in the Far West of Canada during the 20th century. Unlike Georges Bugnet, who immigrated from France to Alberta, she was born and raised in the province; unlike Alberta-born Nancy Huston, who writes in French despite not being a native speaker, she was raised in a Francophone milieu; and unlike Franco-Albertans Marie Moser and Jacqueline Dumas, who mainly wrote in English, she wrote her major works in French. As a result, she has a unique position in Canadian French-language literature as a documenter of life in Francophone Alberta. However, as one of the first Francophone writers to begin a career in British Columbia, she has also been identified as one of the key figures in Franco-Columbian literature. Sauvage-Sauvageon and many of her later stories feature characters (often of Albertan origin) who establish themselves in British Columbia.

Her works have been compared to those of Gabrielle Roy, another major Francophone writer raised on the Canadian Prairies. For example, Blodgett compared the schoolteacher in Maurice Dufault, sous-directeur to the titular character of Roy's Alexandre Chenevert. Dans le muskeg has likewise been compared to Roy's La petite poule d'eau for their treatment of tensions and cross-cultural encounters in geographically and linguistically isolated Francophone communities.

In 2024, Primeau was one of five French-Canadian writers (along with Dany Laferrière, Antonine Maillet, Jean-Marc Dalpé, and Marie-Claire Blais) to be honored by Canada Post with a commemorative stamp.

== Works ==
=== Novels ===
- Dans le muskeg, 1960 (Groupe Fides)
- Maurice Dufault, sous-directeur, 1983 (Éditions des Plaines)

English translation: Maurice Dufault, Vice-principal, tr. Maureen Ranson, 2006 (University of Calgary Press)

- Sauvage-Sauvageon, 1984 (Éditions des Plaines)

English translation: Savage Rose, tr. Margaret M. Wilson, 1999 (Ekstasis Editions)

=== Short story collections ===
- Le totem, 1988 (Éditions des Plaines)

English translation: The Totem, tr. Margaret M. Wilson, 2002 (Ekstasis Editions)

- Ol' Man, Ol' Dog et l'enfant et autres nouvelles, 1996 (Éditions du Blé), expanded in 2004
