= Shelly Moore =

American beauty pageant contestant (born 1978)

- Born: Shelly Moore; September 18, 1978 (age 48); Jacksonville, Florida, U.S.
- Height: 5 ft 8 in (1.73 m)
- Spouse: Will Bartholomew (m. 1999)
- Children: 3
- Beauty pageant titleholder
- Title: Miss Tennessee Teen USA 1997; Miss Teen USA 1997
- Agency: Greenwood Productions (State Title); Miss Universe Organization (National Title)
- Hair color: Blonde
- Eye color: Blue
- Major competition: Miss Teen USA 1997 (winner)

For other people with similar names, see Shelley Moore (disambiguation) Shelly Moore (born September 18, 1978) is an American model and beauty queen who won the Miss Teen USA 1997 title.

In 1996, Moore won the Miss Northern Tennessee local title before competing for and winning the Miss Tennessee Teen USA 1997 contest. She went on to represent Tennessee in the Miss Teen USA contest held at South Padre Island, Texas on 20 August 1997. During the final competition Moore won all three areas of competition: evening gown, swimsuit and interview. She was the first delegate from Tennessee to win the Miss Teen USA or Miss USA titles. Her prize package included more than $150,000 of cash and prizes.

Moore was born and grew up in Jacksonville, Florida before moving to Knoxville. She graduated from South-Doyle High School in Knoxville in 1997 and studied education at the University of Tennessee, having postponed her freshman year because of her duties as Miss Teen USA.

In May 1999, Moore married college football player Will Bartholomew. Both were twenty years old at the time. The couple later had three children.
