= Ravi Menon (disambiguation) =

Ravi Menon (1950–2007) was an Indian actor.

Ravi Menon may also refer to:

- Ravi Menon (economist), Singaporean economist
- Ravi S. Menon, Canadian-American biophysicist
- Ravi Menon, fictional politician in the 2003 film C.I.D. Moosa
