= John Gamon =

Canadian plant physiologist

John A. Gamon

John A. Gamon is a Canadian-American scientist currently working in Nebraska. His work using terrestrial vegetation spectral signatures to discern plant productivity and biodiversity has had a significant impact in the discipline of remote sensing, having published 95 papers and receiving 7,613 citations as of 2017. Gamon pioneered the use of the relationship between leaf xanthophyll cycle pigment content and spectral reflectance to improve satellite monitoring of photosynthesis. Gamon's seminal work resulted in the development of the Photochemical Reflectance Index (PRI). He trained under Nobel Peace Prize laureate Christopher Field.

== Current research ==
Gamon studies the "breathing of the planet"—the exchanges of carbon and water vapour between the biosphere and the atmosphere that affect ecosystem productivity and help regulate our atmosphere and climate. Of particular interest are the effects of disturbance (fires, succession, weather events and climate change) on these basic processes. Additional research questions involve the detection of plant physiology, ecosystem function, species composition, and biodiversity using non-contact sampling methods. Much of this work is done with optical monitoring (remote sensing and automated field methods), and entails the development of new monitoring methods and related informatics tools.

To encourage wider usage of these methods, Gamon co-founded SpecNet, (Spectral Network), a network of collaborating sites and investigators using optical sampling methods (particularly spectral reflectance) to study ecological questions. Gamon conducts fieldwork in a range of ecosystems from the Arctic to the Tropics.

Gamon plays Renaissance and folk violin, and is professor at the University of Nebraska–Lincoln and an Emeritus Professor at the University of Alberta.
