= Pierre Flor-Henry =

Canadian psychiatrist (1934–2024)

Pierre Flor-Henry (March 1, 1934 – May 29, 2024) was a Canadian psychiatrist, researcher, lecturer, and professor. His most important initial contribution was the demonstration in the study of epileptic psychosis, that schizophrenia relates to left and manic-depressive states relate to right hemisphere epilepsies (Epilepsia, 1969).

== Biography ==
Pierre Flor-Henry was born in Passy, Haute Savoie (in France), where his mother was Director of the Sanatorium "Roc des Fiz" and his father one of the architects that built the sanatorium where his parents practised medicine (Plateau d'Assy) France, Flor-Henry graduated from the Faculty of Medicine (1957), followed-up by a Ph.D. in Medicine (M.D. Edin) (1966) presenting the thesis "Psychosis and temporal lobe epilepsy" from the University of Edinburgh. Subsequent degrees and specializations were earned from the University of London, in the United Kingdom and in Quebec, Canada. His full title is Pierre Flor-Henry M.B., Ch.B., M.D. (Edin), Acad. D.P.M. (Lond), F.R.C. Psych., C.S.P.Q. (Psych).

Flor-Henry’s general medicine practice took him through Western, Central, and Eastern Canada from 1958 to 1963. Returning to the United Kingdom, he specialized in psychiatry, epilepsy, electroencephalography and clinical neurophysiology at the Maudsley Hospital (1963-1968). He started at Alberta Hospital Edmonton in 1971 as a consulting psychiatrist. In 1976 he became a Clinical Professor, Department of Psychiatry, University of Alberta. In 1977 he added the Clinical Directorship, of Adult Psychiatry, Alberta Hospital Edmonton. In 1993 Flor-Henry undertook the Directorship of the Clinical Diagnostics and Research Centre (CDRC), Alberta Hospital Edmonton. All four positions have been held concurrently. He died on May 29, 2024 in Edmonton, Alberta.

== Research ==
Much of Pierre Flor-Henry’s clinical and research is conducted in the CDRC which he established and directed. The CDRC is dedicated to offering clinical psychophysiological and neurophysiological assessments that contribute to the diagnosis and treatment of patients. The philosophy of the CDRC is to provide continuous improvement in the provision of assessment and treatment services through fundamental research and program evaluation. The CDRC provides a variety of tests of brain activity that is unique to a psychiatric facility in its breadth and scope. Assessments include clinical EEG recordings, electrocardiograms, multi-channel EEG brain mapping as well as auditory, somatosensory, and cognitive evoked potential recordings.

Other assessments include recordings of autonomic nervous system modalities such as skin conductance and digital pulse volume. Basic research is conducted in the analysis of brain electrical activity in order to improve the understanding of abnormal cerebral mechanisms associated with mental illness and to improve the quality of assessment and treatment. The Alberta College of Physicians and Surgeons in Canada awarded the Clinical Diagnostics and Research Centre full accreditation status as an electroencephalography and evoked potential neurophysiology laboratory.

More recently, Flor-Henry has engaged in multi-channel EEG investigations using source localization (LORETA) in a variety of psychiatric disorders: schizophrenia, mania, depression, multiple personality, chronic fatigue, fibromyalgia, and transsexualism. Also, he has investigated in a similar way, differences in EEG organization of normal males and females, of cerebral activity during verbal and spatial cognitive tasks, and of male/female difference in the psychoses.

The publication and presentation of Flor-Henry’s findings from 1969 onwards has triggered an enormous amount of research internationally, on laterality and psychopathology. Flor-Henry’s research has extended his early findings to the study of the patterns of cerebral disorganization in a variety of mental disorders with neuropsychological and quantitative EEG approaches: e.g. in depression, schizophrenia, mania, psychopathy, sexual deviation, hysteria, multiple personality, obsessive compulsive disorder, and, in normal controls (task, age, and gender effects). In addition to his extensive empirical research, he has written, edited, and published a number of books integrating the findings in these areas along with theoretical reviews on the implications of disrupted lateral hemispheric organization in psychiatric conditions.

In 2007, Flor-Henry was named the 2007 recipient for the Career Contribution Award from the EEG and Clinical Neuroscience Society. This award was given in recognition of his lifetime contributions to clinical neurophysiology in psychiatry.

== Bibliography ==
FLOR-HENRY, P. (1969). Psychosis and temporal lobe epilepsy: A controlled investigation. Epilepsia, 10: 363–395.

FLOR-HENRY, P. (1974). Psychosis, neurosis, and epilepsy: Developmental and gender related effects and their aetiological contribution. British Journal of Psychiatry, 124: 144–150.

FLOR-HENRY, P., Lamprecht, F. (1976). Generalized seizures, limbic seizures, forced normalization and psychoses. In Deiter Janz (Ed.) Epileptology, Georg Thieme Publishers, Stuttgart: 80–90.

FLOR-HENRY, P. (1979). On certain aspects of the localization of the cerebral systems regulating and determining emotion. Biological Psychiatry, 14: 677–698.

FLOR-HENRY, P., Koles, Z. (1982). EEG characteristics of normal subjects: A comparison of men and women and of dextrals and sinistrals. Research Communications in Psychology, Psychiatry and Behavior, 7(1): 21–38.

FLOR-HENRY, P. (1983). Determinants of psychosis in epilepsy – laterality and forced normalization. Biological Psychiatry, 18 (9): 1045–1057.

FLOR-HENRY, P., Fromm-Auch, D., Schopflocher, D. (1983). Neuropsychological dimensions of psychopathology. In P. Flor-Henry & J. Gruzelier (Ed.) Laterality and Psychopathology, Elsevier Biomedical Press, North Holland: 59–82.

FLOR-HENRY, P. (1983). Mood, the right hemisphere and the implications of spatial information perceiving systems. Research Communication Psychology, Psychiatry and Behavior, 8(2): 143–170.

FLOR-HENRY, P. (1984). Hemispheric laterality and disorders of affect. In R.M. Post & J.C. Ballenger (Ed.) Neurobiology of Mood Disorders, Williams and Wilkins, Baltimore: 467–480.

FLOR-HENRY, P. (1986). Observations, reflections and speculations on the cerebral determinants of mood and on the bilaterally asymmetrical distributions of the major neurotransmitter systems. With permission of Croom Helm Ltd. In Acta Neurologica Scandinavica, 74, (Suppl. 109): 75–89.

FLOR-HENRY, P. (1987). Cerebral aspects of sexual deviation. In G. Wilson (Ed.) Variant Sexuality: Research and Theory, Croom Helm Ltd., London & Sidney: 49–83.

FLOR-HENRY, P. (1989). Psychopathology and hemispheric specialization: Left hemispheric dysfunction in schizophrenia, psychopathy, hysteria and the obsessional syndrome. In F. Boller, J. Grafman & G. Gainotti (Ed.), Handbook of Neuropsychology, Section VI; Emotional Behaviour and its Disorders. Amsterdam, Elsevier Science Publishers, Biomedical Division, 477–494.

FLOR-HENRY, P. (1990). Influence of gender in schizophrenia as related to other psychopathological syndromes. Schizophrenia Bulletin Special Edition on Gender and Schizophrenia, Vol. 16(2): 211–227.

FLOR-HENRY, P. (1992). Laterality and motility disturbances in psychopathology: A theoretical perspective. In: Movement Disorders in Neurology and Neuropsychiatry, Second Edition, A.B. Joseph and R.R. Young (Ed.), Blackwell Scientific Publications Inc., Boston, MA 327–334.

FLOR-HENRY, P. (1993). Electrodermal amplitude asymmetry and orienting response-non-response in psychopathology. In: Progress in Electrodermal Research, Roy, J.C., Bousein, W., Fowles, D.C., Gruzelier, J. H. (Ed.), Plenum Publishing Corporation, New York. 289–296.

Koles, Z.J., Lind, J.C., FLOR-HENRY, P. (1994). Spatial patterns in the background EEG underlying mental diseases in man. Journal of Electroencephalography and Clinical Neurophysiology, 91: 319–328.

FLOR-HENRY, P. (1999). Cerebral Basis of Psychopathology, (1983) Wright-PSG Inc. Littleton, Mass. (Japanese translation by Dr. Toshiro Fujimoto through Tuttle-mori Agency Inc.) Japanese publishers Sozo Shuppan, Tokyo, Japan.

Purdon, S., FLOR-HENRY, P. (2000). Asymmetrical olfactory acuity and neuroleptic treatment in schizophrenia. Schizophrenia Research, Sep 1; 44(3): 221–232.

Purdon, S., Klein, S., FLOR-HENRY, P. (2001). Menstrual effects on asymmetrical olfactory acuity. Journal of the International Neuropsychological Society, 7: 703–709.

Pazderka-Robinson, H., Morrison, J., FLOR-HENRY, P. (2004). Electrodermal dissociation of chronic fatigue and depression: Evidence for distinct physiological mechanisms. International Journal of Psychophysiology, 53: 171–182.

FLOR-HENRY, P., Lind, J.C., Koles, Z.J. (2004). A source-imaging (low-resolution electromagnetic tomography) study of the EEGs from unmedicated males with depression. Psychiatry Research: Neuroimaging 130(2): 191–207.

Koles, Z.J., FLOR-HENRY, P., Lind, J.C. (2004). A source-imaging (low-resolution electromagnetic tomography) study of the EEGs from unmedicated males with schizophrenia. Psychiatry Research: Neuroimaging 130(2): 171–190.

Loganovsky, K.N., Volovik, S.V., Manton, K.G., Bazyka, D.A., FLOR-HENRY, P. (2005). Whether ionizing radiation is a risk factor for schizophrenia spectrum disorders? The World Journal of Biological Psychiatry, 6(4): 212–230.
