= Photochemical Reflectance Index =

The Photochemical Reflectance Index (PRI) is a reflectance measurement developed by John Gamon during his tenure as a postdoctoral fellow supervised by Christopher Field at the Carnegie Institution for Science at Stanford University. The PRI is sensitive to changes in carotenoid pigments (e.g. xanthophyll pigments) in live foliage. Carotenoid pigments are indicative of photosynthetic light use efficiency, or the rate of carbon dioxide uptake by foliage per unit energy absorbed. As such, it is used in studies of vegetation productivity and stress. Because the PRI measures plant responses to stress, it can be used to assess general ecosystem health using satellite data or other forms of remote sensing. Applications include vegetation health in evergreen shrublands, forests, and agricultural crops prior to senescence. PRI is defined by the following equation using reflectance (ρ) at the wavelengths of 531 nm and 570 nm:

$$PRI=\frac{(\rho 531- \rho 570)}{( \rho 531+ \rho 570)}$$

Some authors use

$$PRI=\frac{( \rho 570- \rho 531)}{( \rho 570+ \rho 531)}$$

The values range from –1 to 1.

== Sources ==
- ENVI Users Guide
- John Gamon, Josep Penuelas, and Christopher Field (1992). A narrow-waveband spectral index that tracks diurnal changes in photosynthetic efficiency. Remote Sensing of environment, 41, 35-44.
- Drolet, G.G. Heummrich, K.F. Hall, F.G., Middleton, E.M., Black, T.A., Barr, A.G. and Margolis, H.A. (2005). A MODIS-derived photochemical reflectance index to detect inter-annual variations in the photosynthetic light-use efficiency of a boreal deciduous forest. Remote Sensing of environment, 98, 212-224.
