= Constantine G. Lyketsos =

American academic

Constantine G. Lyketsos (born 5 November 1961) is the Elizabeth Plank Althouse Professor in Alzheimer's Disease Research in the Department of Psychiatry and Behavioral Sciences at the Johns Hopkins University. He is the founding director of the Richman Family Precision Medicine Center of Excellence in Alzheimer's Disease, and an associate director of the Johns Hopkins Alzheimer's Disease Research Center (ADRC).

== Education ==
Constantine (Kostas) Lyketsos was born on 5 November 1961 in London and grew up in Athens. After completing grade and high school at Athens College, he attended Northwestern University, where he earned a B.A. in Psychology, followed by a medical doctorate (MD) from Washington University's School of Medicine.In 1993, he received a Masters in Health Sciences (MHS) in Epidemiology/Clinical Epidemiology from Johns Hopkins Bloomberg School of Public Health.

== Research and career ==
Lyketsos' research mainly focuses on treatment development for neurodegenerative disease especially dementia and Alzheimer's disease. His work employs the methods of translational and interventional epidemiology and involve biomarkers, and brain imaging.

He has conducted seminal research on the neuropsychiatric disturbances (NPS) associated with degenerative brain disease including studies of patterns of occurrence and impact of NPS on dementia or transition from normal to Mild cognitive impairment (MCI) to dementia. Lyketsos’ team is developing biomarkers to accelerate treatment development for Alzheimer's disease and other forms of brain injury. He was a Senior fellow at the school of medicine, Johns Hopkins University. He previously served as Chair of the Academy of Psychosomatic Medicine Taskforce on Subspecialization which spearheaded approval of the Psychiatric subspecialty of Consultation Liaison Psychiatry in 2004.

As of 1 July 2021, Lyketsos’ scholarly work had an h-index of 129, with more than 58,000 citations.

== Awards and honors ==
Lyketsos was awarded the 2006 William S. Proxmire Prize as a leader in the fight against Alzheimer's Disease. Additional awards include Phi Beta Kappa, Alpha Omega Alpha, as well as the geriatric psychiatry trifecta: Distinguished Scientist Award (American Association for Geriatric Psychiatry), Jack Weinberg Award in Geriatric Psychiatry (American Psychiatric Association), and the Geriatric Research Award (American College of Psychiatrists).

== Books ==
- Margaret S. Chisolm and Constantine G. Lyketsos. “Systematic Psychiatric Evaluation: A Step-by-Step Guide to applying the perspectives of psychiatry. 2012.
- Peter V. Rabins and Constantine G. Lyketsos. “Practical Dementia Care”. 1999.
- Editors with Constantine G. Lyketsos. “Designing and delivering dementia services”.
- Editors with Constantine G. Lyketsos. “Treating Dementia: Do we have a pill for it?”.
- Constantine G. Lyketsos with Editors. “Psychiatric Aspects of Neurologic Diseases: Practical Approaches to Patient Care”.

== See also ==
- Forced normalization
- Neuropsychiatry
