= International School of Kenya =

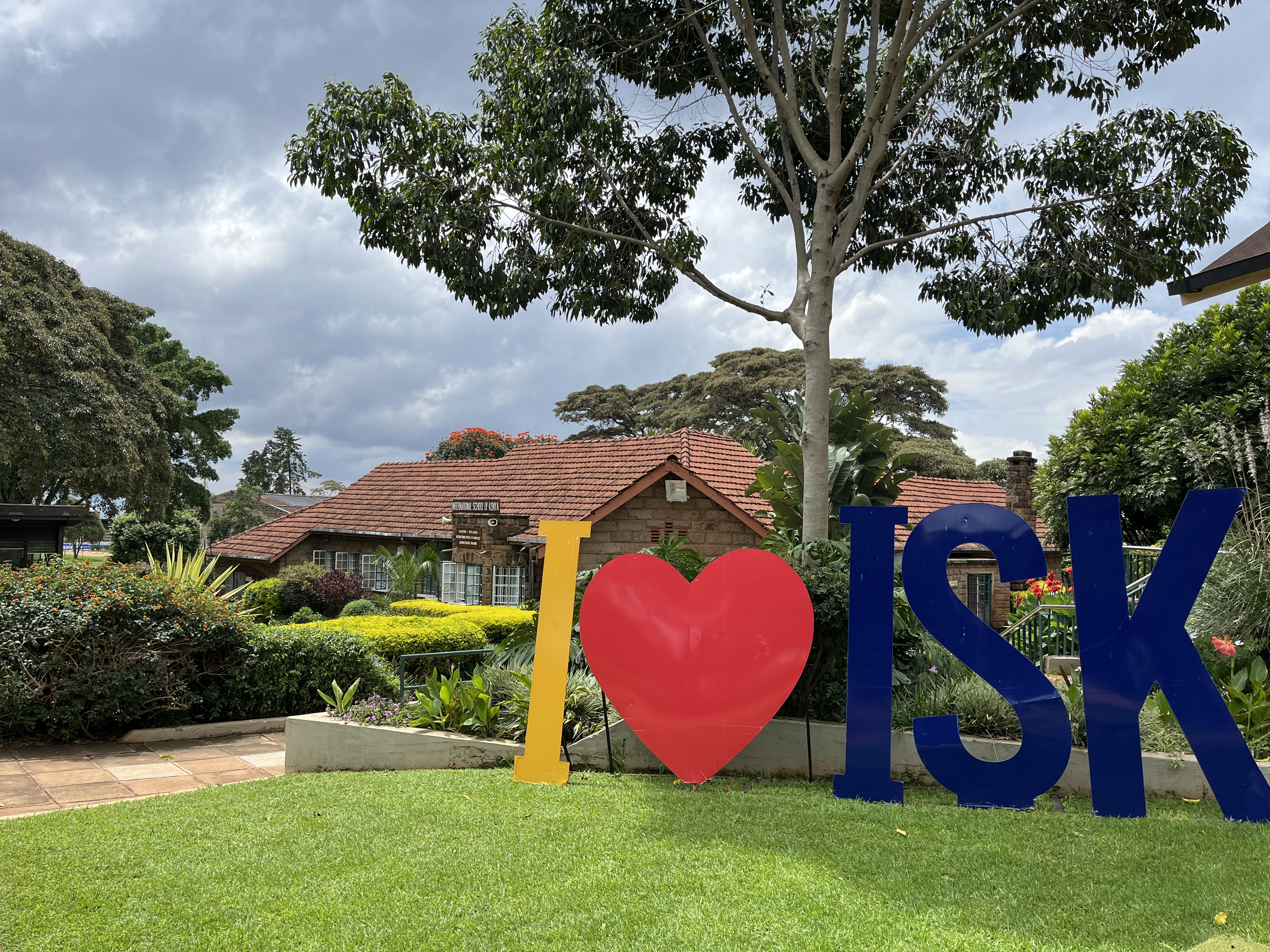

Location
- Nairobi; Kenya; 1°13′54″S 36°45′51″E

Information
- Type: International Baccalaureate school, private international school
- Established: 1976
- Director: Julie Lemley (interim)
- Faculty: 149
- Grades: Pre-K to 12
- Enrollment: ~1,200
- Colors: Blue & Gold
- Mascot: Lion
- Affiliation: United States Embassy, Canadian High Commission
- Curriculum: North American/International Baccalaureate
- Website: International School of Kenya

The International School of Kenya (ISK) is a private, non-profit, international, day school for pre-kindergarten to grade 12 students located in Nairobi, Kenya.

The student body of just over 1,000 represents more than 75 different nationalities, including the United States, Canada, Kenya, Denmark, the Netherlands, China, Japan, Vietnam, and Brazil.

ISK is accredited by the Middle States Commission on Higher Education and is a member of the Association of International Schools in Africa (AISA), the Council of International Schools, Round Square, and competes in the International Schools of Southern and Eastern Africa (ISSEA) league. The school curriculum uses North American standards (ex. Common Core) with all ISK graduates earning a North American high school diploma. Most graduates also earn the International Baccalaureate Diploma.

== Academics ==
ISK offers an American-style education using Common Core frameworks and pedagogical approaches. Since 1982, it has offered the International Baccalaureate Diploma Program in grades 11-12. The language of instruction is English. World language courses in Spanish, French and Kiswahili are also part of the school's academic program. Since 2019, ISK has also offered a Life Centered Education (LCE) program for students with mild to moderate learning needs.

ISK faculty are highly qualified teachers. In 2024, ISK employed 149 faculty. Over 60% of faculty held master’s degrees. Many also have experience working in multiple international schools. Numerous teachers are also published and lead sessions at international conferences.

ISK was ranked 7th out of the top 100 best high schools in Africa by Africa Almanac in 2003, based upon quality of education, student engagement, strength and activities of alumni, school profile, internet and news visibility. ISK's Plastiki Rafiki upcycling program won the International Schools Award for Community Building Award in 2022.

== History ==
=== Early Days ===
The International School of Kenya's origins date to 1967 when Nancy Ellen Crooks opened the American Community School with 30 children in a home near the Nairobi Hospital. Crooks became the first principal. Three years later, in 1970, the United States International University (USIU) acquired the school and relocated it to its current site on the former coffee plantation with a white wooden house and two stone buildings located at the end of Peponi Road. They renamed it Nairobi International School (NIS). Under USIU leadership, the school expanded grade offerings and even introduced university level courses.

=== Becoming ISK ===
In 1976, the 485 student NIS was renamed the International School of Kenya. At that time, the Pre-kindergarten through Grade 12 school registered with the Kenya Ministry of Education. Since then, ISK has been governed by a joint partnership of the United States Embassy and Canadian High Commission.

ISK began offering the International Baccalaureate Diploma in 1982, the same year that US President George H. W. Bush visited campus. ISK's first IB diploma candidates graduated in 1984.

The campus pool was constructed in 1978. However, the early 1980s was the first big period of significant construction on campus. Capital projects including classroom blocks, tennis courts, a gym, and multi-purpose building were constructed. During the 1990s facilities upgrades included purpose-built science facilities during the 1993-1994 academic year, and the grand opening of the Performing Arts Centre in 2000 including a 547-seat theater. New high school classrooms were opened in 2006.

ISK's Commons, an iconic round building at the center of campus, opened in 2013. This major change on campus was soon followed by new state-of-the-art elementary classrooms opened in 2015. In November 2023, acclaimed Kenyan sprinter Ferdinand Omanyala helped cut the ribbon on ISK's new track-and-field facilities.

=== Finances: tuition, scholarships, taxes ===
ISK's high tuition is the subject of annual news reports. In 2024, annual tuition for pre-kindergarten pupils was US $18,500 (KSh 2.38 million) and US $36,600 (KSh 4.72 million) for grades 11-12. ISK also offers annual scholarships covering 100% of high school tuition for Kenyan citizens based on merit and financial need.

ISK finances have undergone scrutiny. In 2021, the Kenya Revenue Authority won 1.4 billion Kenyan shillings from the school in unpaid taxes from teacher salaries since 2016. In 2023, Katherine Musee, a former teacher, sued the school over alleged pay inequalities and separate payrolls between expatriate teachers and local teachers.

== Notable individuals ==
=== Notable alumni ===
- Dan Eldon, English photojournalist
- Hooman Ehsani, property develop
- Shamim Ehsani, hotelier
- Karen Graham, Canadian author and dietitian

=== Directors ===
- Mike Callan (since 2021)
- David Henry (2016-2021)
- John Roberts (2009-2016)
- Areta Williams (2004-2008)
- Dr. David T. Bratt (1985-1988)
- Dr. Brian L. McCauley (1981-1985)
- Nancy Ellen Crooks (1967-?)
