= Jacob Masliyah =

Jacob H. Masliyah OC, AOE, FRSC
- Born: August 9, 1942 (age 83); Baghdad, Iraq
- Known for: Expert in oil sands engineering

Jacob H. Masliyah, OC AOE FRSC (born August 9, 1942) is a University of Alberta professor emeritus and expert in oil sands engineering. He is an officer of the Order of Canada, has been named a fellow of the Royal Society of Canada and a fellow of the Canadian Academy of Engineering. He was also elected an international member of the US National Academy of Engineering in 2011 for advancing the science and technology for recovery of bitumen from oil sands.

In 2013, he received an honorary science degree from the University of Alberta. In 2015, he was made a member of the Alberta Order of Excellence.

== Industrial contributions ==
Masliyah has been involved with the oil sands industry in Alberta for over three decades. His research has focused mainly on bitumen extraction. He has applied fluid dynamics, heat and mass transfer, interfacial and surface science and colloids to oil sand lump ablation, bitumen-sand separation and emulsion formation. He also worked to create stronger relationships between the oil sand operators and university researchers. Mathematical simulators developed in his laboratory are commonly used in the design of new and operation of current bitumen extraction plants.
