= Franco Romano Calaresu =

Canadian medical academics (1931-1996)

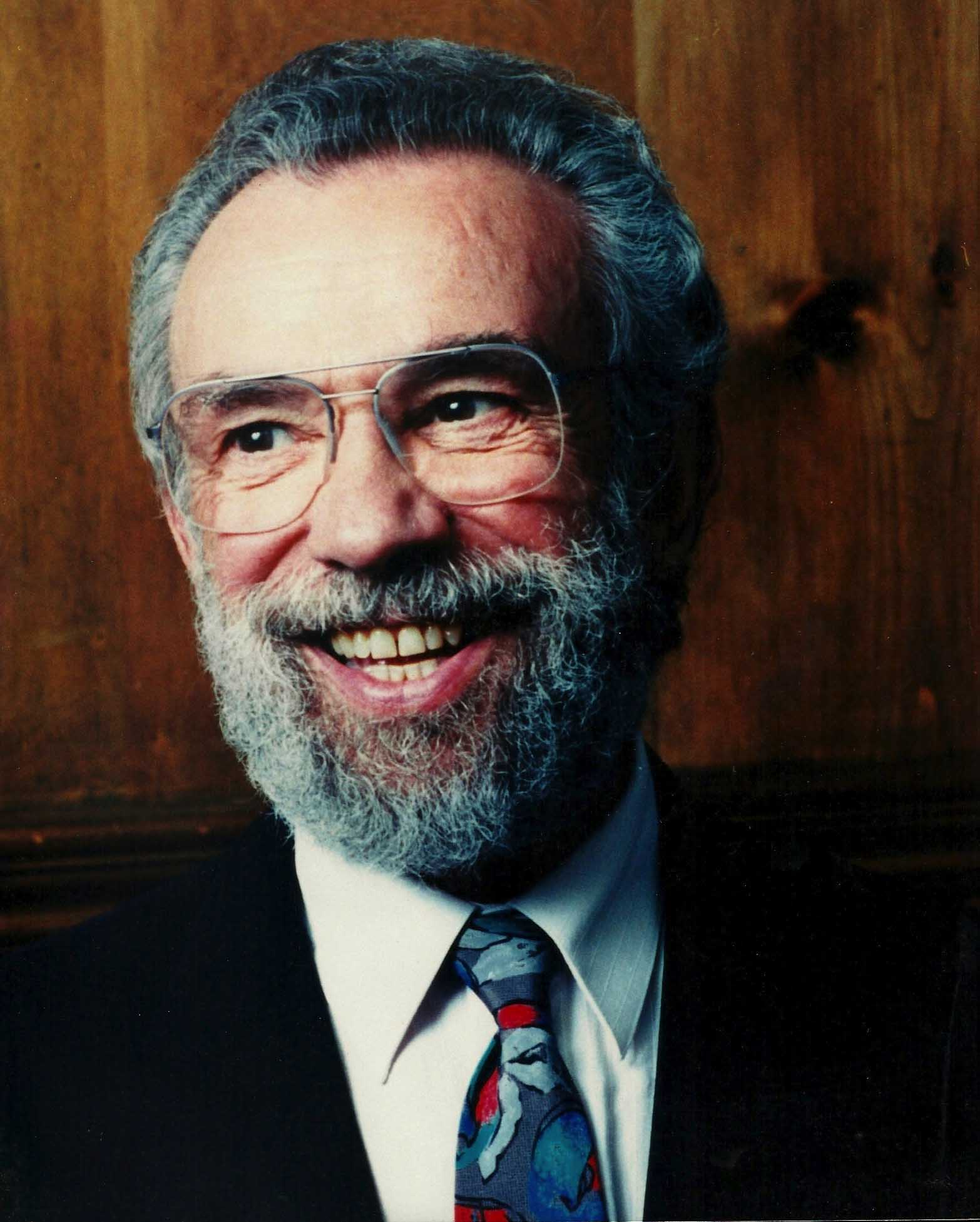
- Born: 1931
- Died: July 26, 1996 (aged 64–65)
- Education: University of Milan M.D. University of Alberta (Ph.D.)

Franco Romano Calaresu (1931 – July 26, 1996) was initially a medical doctor and later became a Canadian scholar and professor of neurophysiology at the Department of Physiology at the University of Western Ontario. He held an M.D. from the University of Milan, and a Ph.D. from the University of Alberta. He was elected in 1995 as a Fellow of the Royal Society of Canada. His main area of interest was the nervous system and the integration of its mechanisms. His group pioneered the use of the mainframe analysis of data collected during surgical experiments on laboratory animals. He had mostly carried out neural studies on the central and peripheral mechanisms of autonomic reflexes, with special emphasis on the cardiovascular ones. He was also interested in Dante, and belonged to a group of faculty members who met to read and discuss Dante's work.

== Publications ==
=== Articles ===
- Neural integration of physiological mechanisms and behaviour: JAF Stevenson memorial volume (1975)
- Experimental Physiology (1985)
