= Karen Graham (dietitian) =

Canadian author and registered dietitian

Karen M. Graham is a Canadian author and registered dietitian best known for her published work Canada’s Diabetes Meals for Good Health.

== Early years ==
Karen Graham was born in Nairobi, Kenya in 1959 to Canadian parents, and was brought up in Kenya, Scotland and Canada, where she was exposed to different cultures and many ethnic food tastes. She graduated from high school at the Nairobi International School (now known as International School of Kenya).

== Career as a Registered Dietitian (1983-present) ==
Graham completed a Bachelor of Home Economics (Foods and Nutrition Program) at the University of Alberta, and a dietitian internship at the Health Sciences Centre (Winnipeg) to become a Registered Dietitian in 1983. She became a Certified Diabetes Educator in 1994. She has worked across Canada, and presently is a nutrition counsellor in British Columbia. She has counselled over 5,000 patients about diabetes and lifestyle changes for good health. She has done nutrition consulting work in the areas of diabetes, renal, prenatal nutrition and home care. Graham is a writer of health and nutrition books in the genre of non-fiction, including technical nutrition documents and plain language books.

== Published works ==
Canada’s Diabetes Meals for Good Health (2012, 2nd Edition) published in cooperation with the Canadian Diabetes Association (American edition: Diabetes Meals for Good Health) published by Robert Rose Inc. Over 200,000 copies of the book have been sold, including earlier editions. A 2001 edition was produced with Health Canada and National Aboriginal Diabetes Association. This cookbook/meal planner includes life-size photographs of meals that are calorie-equivalent, and a large and small meal concept. Graham’s cooking style uses everyday ingredients, is fast, easy, and nutritious. ISBN 978-0-7788-0402-4 (Canada) and 978-0-7788-0403-1 (USA)

The Complete Diabetes Guide for Type 2 Diabetes (2011, 2nd edition) published in cooperation with the National Aboriginal Diabetes Association by Paper Birch Publishing. Over 10,000 copies have been sold, including the earlier edition. This easy-to-understand book has up-to-date information about how to prevent or reduce type 2 diabetes complications that affect your heart and kidneys, and your eyes and feet. Includes a complete 7 day diabetes meal plan and three levels of exercise plans. Regional Winner of Dietitians of Canada Speaking of Food and Healthy Living Award. ISBN 978-0-9867833-2-6

生活習慣病にも役立つおいしい洋食レシピ / (2009). Japanese translation of Meals for Good Health published by JPY, Japan, with cover endorsement by Dr. Yukio Hattori, Medical Doctor, chef and judge on the television show The Iron Chef. ISBN 978-4-904636-00-8

La santé au menu (2010, 2nd edition). French translation of Meals for Good Health published by Les Édition de l'Homme in co-operation with Canadian Diabetes Association. ISBN 978-2-7619-2785-7

Manitoba Home Care Program Nutrition Resource Guide (1999). Published by Manitoba Health in cooperation with Dietitians of Canada.

Food Irradiation: A Canadian Folly (1983). Published by Paper Birch Publishing. ISBN 0-9696770-0-6.
