= Joseph Kubanek =

American psychiatrist (1896–1970)

Dr Joseph Kubanek (January 16, 1896 – November 24, 1970) was an American psychiatrist known for his work in electroencephalography (EEG).

== Education ==
Kubanek studied at the University of Alberta from 1919 to 1922 before receiving his MD from the University of Toronto in 1930. He completed postgraduate work and further study at many different universities in the United States throughout the next twenty years.

== Employment ==
Kubanek worked at many different hospitals, completing his internship in Detroit at St. Mary's Hospital in 1931 and his residency at Rhode Island State Hospital in 1936, before becoming chief of psychiatry and neurology at Veterans Administration Hospital in Dearborn, Michigan in 1950, a post he would hold until his retirement in 1968. From then until his death he was affiliated with Pontiac State Hospital. He also held positions at Wayne State College of Medicine becoming an instructor in 1948, clinical assistant professor in 1950, clinical associate professor 1954 and becoming a full professor in 1960, a position he would hold until his death in 1970.

== Research ==
Electroencephalography was Kubanek's main area of research and he helped develop electrotherapy in Michigan. His research papers include:

- Electro Therapy In Schizophrenia' (Journal of Nervous and Mental Disease, June 1942)
- Use of Dilantin in Treatment of Psychotic Patients Unresponsive to Other Treatment (Diseases of the Nervous System, February 1946)
- The Possible Use of NISSIL Substance in Treatment of Schizophrenia and Neurosis (International Record of Medicine and General Practice Clinics, September 1953)

== Memberships ==
Kubanek was a Life Fellow of both the American College of Physicians and the American Psychiatric Association as well as being a Diplomate of the American Board of Psychiatry and Neurology.
