= Lesley-Anne Scorgie =

Canadian author, speaker and personal finance consultant

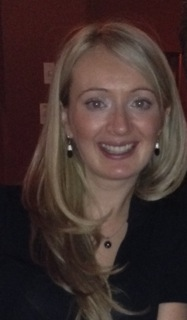
- Born: 1983 (age 42–43); Toronto, Ontario, Canada
- Education: University of Alberta; Queen's School of Business
- Notable work: Rich by book series
- Website: lesleyscorgie.com

Lesley-Anne Scorgie is a Canadian author, speaker and personal finance consultant based in Calgary, Alberta. She published her first book titled Rich by Thirty: A Young Adult’s Guide to Financial Success in 2007 followed by a second book in 2010. Scorgie released her latest book titled Well-Heeled: The Smart Girl’s Guide to Getting Rich in 2014.

In 2011, she was the winner of the Top 40 Under 40 in Avenue a Calgary-based magazine and she was also featured in Top 100 Most Powerful Women in Canada in the Future Leaders category by Alberta's Women's Executive Network.

== Early life and education ==
Scorgie was born in Toronto and raised in Calgary. She credits her parents for teaching her about finances and saving. She received her first allowance, a quarter, when she was three. On her 10th birthday, she purchased her first Canada Savings Bond from $100 that she received from her grand parents and decided to save nearly whatever she earned hoping to become financially successful by 25. While she was in high school, she worked at the Calgary Public Library and invested the majority of her earnings into mutual funds and stocks. When she was young, her family faced financial problems which inspired her to learn about saving. Having a job at the library helped her in reading about finance and investments. She purchased her first mutual fund at 14. According to Scorgie, she became financially literate by reading every Warren Buffett book and getting professional investment advice.

Her parents told her that she would have to pay for her college so she started saving. However, when she joined University of Alberta, her savings partly covered her tuition and she had to get loans to pay for the rest. Scorgie graduated from the University of Alberta in 2005 with a Bachelor of Commerce degree in marketing and finance. In 2012, she graduated from the Queen's School of Business with an MBA.

== Career ==
She took her first job at the Calgary Public Library when she was in high school and invested the majority of her earnings into mutual funds and stocks. While she was attending the University of Alberta, she worked at the Royal Bank of Canada for four years.

She is the founder and owner of Rich By Inc., the Calgary-based company under which she writes and speaks about financial literacy. She is also a Finance Analyst with EnCana Corporation in the corporate strategy group. o In early 2008, Scorgie joined the board of the YWCA Canada and in 2011 she became the organization's treasurer and also serves as a member on the University of Alberta President's Think Tank Committee.

Scorgie appeared on The Oprah Winfrey Show when she was 17 in the segment Ordinary People, Extraordinary Wealth, where she said that she would be a millionaire by 25. However, she was not able to achieve the goal. She has also appeared as a guest on The Montel Williams Show, The Marilyn Denis Show and MTV Live.

Scorgie advocates that financial literacy training should be available in grade school to teach children about basic financial and debt principles. She volunteers presenting a money-managing class Money 101 to high school students a few times a year. She also puts on financial literacy presentations for students of University of Alberta. She earned her professional speaking designation through the Canadian Association of Professional Speakers.

== Books and articles ==
=== Rich by series ===
Scorgie wrote her first book titled Rich by Thirty: A Young Adult’s Guide to Financial Success while she was studying at University of Alberta. The book was released in 2007 and became a bestseller six weeks after its release. According to her, she got the idea of writing the book in her first marketing class at University of Alberta when they were discussing serving various market niches and she realized that there was nobody operating in the financial literacy niche for under-30 people. The book provides worksheets, action plans, and tips to help young people save and plan their financial future. Rich by Thirty has been translated into English, French and Korean. An American version of the book has also been released that eliminates references to Canadian savings vehicles and inserts the American equivalents.

She published her second book Rich by Forty: A Young Couple’s Guide to Building Net Worth in 2010 and it was named a bestseller after its release in 2010. In order to write the books, she interviewed people from average financial backgrounds and occupations who became wealthy and wrote about what she found common in the people.

=== Other work ===
She writes a regular column for Metro called Fun and Frugal as well as a special series Money 101 and has also written financial articles for the Toronto Star, The Globe and Mail and Men's Health Magazine. She recommends young people to start saving early and plan their financial future. Scorgie calls herself a "smart shopper" and says that her technique to save money is shopping with a discount in mind. She advocates sectors such as utilities and railroads for investing.

Scorgie released Well-Heeled: The Smart Girl’s Guide to Getting Rich in 2014. The book features financial tips for young women.

Scorgie released her latest book titled The Modern Couple's Money Guide: 7 Steps to Building Wealth Together in 2016. It features key steps that can help couples reach their financial potential together.

== Personal life ==
Scorgie lives in Calgary where she owns her house. She purchased her first home when she was 21.

== Bibliography ==
- Rich by Thirty: A Young Adult’s Guide to Financial Success (2007)
- Rich by Forty: A Young Couple’s Guide to Building Net Worth (2010)
- Well-Heeled: The Smart Girl’s Guide to Getting Rich (2014)
- The Modern Couple's Money Guide: 7 Smart Steps to Building Wealth Together (2016)
