= Charlene Bearhead =

Canadian educator, author and activist

Charlene Bearhead is an educator, author, and Indigenous education advocate. She was the first educational lead for the University of Manitoba's National Centre for Truth and Reconciliation.

== Career ==
She received a bachelor degree in education from the University of Alberta in 1985. Bearhead holds permanent teaching certification in both Alberta and Manitoba. She has taught for Parkland School Division and Calgary School District in Alberta and St. Vital School Division in Manitoba. She was principal, and later superintendent of education at Paul First Nation and also served as interim education director for the Alexander First Nation.

Bearhead founded Mother Earth's Children's Charter School in Wabamun in 2003 and served as its first principal. Bearhead helped establish an Aboriginal Circle program and developed a Youth Cultural Reconciliation Special Project for public schools in Edmonton. Then in 2025, she led the development of a new Indigenous focused public charter school in Drayton Valley, Alberta: Roots of Resilience Charter School.

In the mid 1990's, Bearhead led negotiation of the First Nations and Inuit Child Care Initiative on behalf of Treaty 6, Treaty 7, Treaty 8 Alberta as well as Ontario and soon after facilitated the establishment of the Early Childhood Services division for the Alberta regional office of the First Nations and Inuit Health Branch of Health Canada.

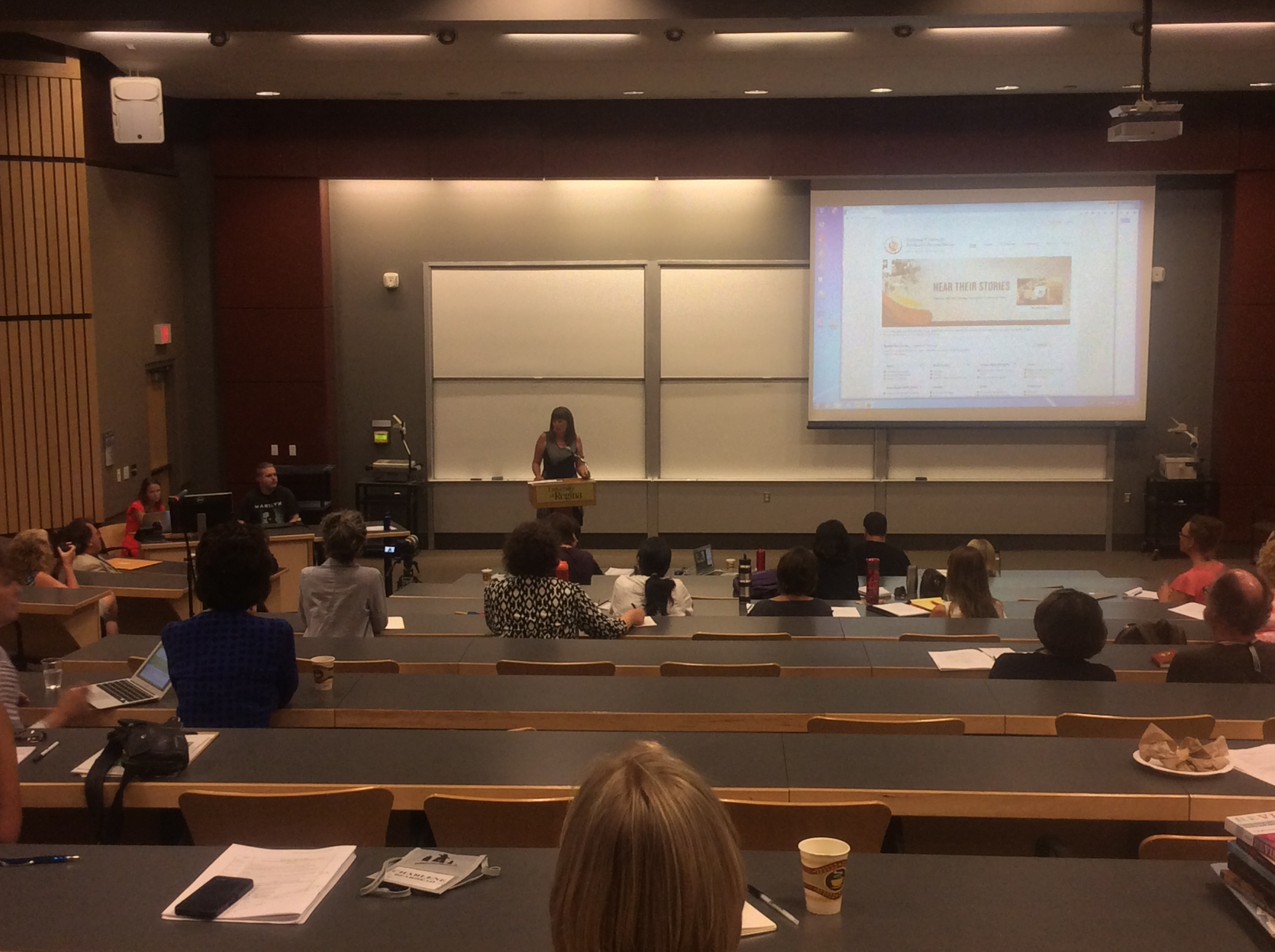
Charlene Bearhead presenting at the University of Regina, Saskatchewan, Canada in July 2015

Within her role as program manager for the National Day of Healing and Reconciliation at Native Counselling Services of Alberta, from 2011-2014 Bearhead took on the role of national coordinator for Project of Heart as one of multiple programs undertaken to educate Canadians on the history and legacy of residential schools. From 2015 to early 2017, Bearhead was the first education lead for the National Centre for Truth and Reconciliation at the University of Manitoba. She subsequently was named education coordinator for the National Inquiry into Murdered and Missing Indigenous Women and Girls. and later moved on to support the establishment of the education programs at the Indian Residential School History and Dialogue Centre at UBC.

Bearhead was the education adviser for the Canadian Geographic Indigenous Peoples Atlas of Canada project in 2016-17 and was subsequently invited to the position of Vice President-Learning and Reconciliation for the Royal Canadian Geographical Society.

Together with Wilson Bearhead, and illustrator, Chloe Bluebird Mustooch, Bearhead authored the Siha Tooskin Knows series of children's book published by Highwater Press, an imprint of Portage and Main Press, based in Winnipeg, Manitoba on Treaty 1 Territory and Homeland of the Métis Nation.

== Books ==
The Love of the Dance, Siha Tooskin Knows series (2020)

The Sacred Eagle Feather, Siha Tooskin Knows series (2020)

The Best Medicine, Siha Tooskin Knows series (2020)

The Catcher of Dreams, Siha Tooskin Knows series (2020)

The Gifts of His People, Siha Tooskin Knows series (2020)

The Nature of Life, The Strength of His Hair, Siha Tooskin Knows series (2020)

The Strength of His Hair, Siha Tooskin Knows series (2020)

The Offering of Tobacco, Siha Tooskin Knows series (2020)
