= Arturo Sanchez-Azofeifa =

Professor at the University of Alberta

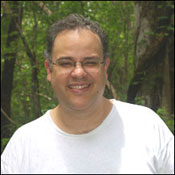
Arturo Sanchez-Azofeifa

Gerardo Arturo Sánchez-Azofeifa is a professor at the University of Alberta, the director of the university's Center for Earth Observation Sciences, and the director of Tropi-Dry, a research group focusing on land use studies in tropical dry regions of the Americas. His research is related to the study of impacts of land use/cover change (LUCC) on biodiversity loss and habitat fragmentation in tropical dry forest environments.

== Research ==
Sánchez-Azofeifa uses technology, including remote sensing and phenology towers, to evaluate land use and cover change in Central America. His research focuses on the efficacy of creating protected areas (National Parks and Biological Reserves) and use of Environmental Services payment methods to control tropical deforestation. In addition, his research examines remote sensing (multispectral and hyperspectral) in connection with Primary Productivity (PP), Leaf Area Index (LAI), Photosynthetic Active Radiation (PAR) and biodiversity, particularly in tropical secondary dry forests. He is currently developing techniques to identify and understand the relationship of lianas (non-self supporting tropical plants) and tropical hardwood species by means of hyperspectral remote sensing to generate data reflecting detailed leaf and canopy level information. Sánchez-Azofeifa's most cited paper is his 2006 Nature article, "Widespread amphibian extinctions from epidemic disease driven by global warming."
