= Vaclav Zizler =

Czech mathematician (born 1943)

Vaclav Zizler (born 8 March 1943), is a Czech mathematics professor specializing in Banach space theory and non-linear spaces. As of 2006, Dr. Zizler holds the position of Professor Emeritus at the University of Alberta in Edmonton, Alberta, Canada. Formerly he was at the Mathematical Institute of the Czech Academy of Sciences where he was Head of Research. In 2001 the Czech Minister of Education named his Functional Analysis and Infinite Dimensional Geometry the university textbook of the year. In 2008 he was, for his excellent lifelong work in mathematical analysis and selfless activities in favour of the Czech mathematics, awarded a laureate medal by the Czech Mathematical Society.

== Selected publications ==
Books

- Fabian, Marián; Habala, Petr; Hájek, Petr; Montesinos Santalucía, Vicente; Pelant, Jan; Zizler, Václav (2001), Functional Analysis and Infinite-dimensional Geometry, CMS Books in Mathematics, vol. 8, New York: Springer-Verlag, doi:10.1007/978-1-4757-3480-5, ISBN 0-387-95219-5.
- Deville, Robert; Godefroy, Gilles; Zizler, Václav (1993), Smoothness and Renormings in Banach Spaces, Pitman Monographs and Surveys in Pure and Applied Mathematics, vol. 64, New York: John Wiley & Sons, p. xii+376, ISBN 0-582-07250-6.

Research articles

- Deville, Robert; Godefroy, Gilles; Zizler, Václav (1993), "A smooth variational principle with applications to Hamilton-Jacobi equations in infinite dimensions", Journal of Functional Analysis, 111 (1): 197–212, doi:10.1006/jfan.1993.1009, MR 1200641.
- Zizler, Václav (1973), "On some extremal problems in Banach spaces", Mathematica Scandinavica, 32: 214–224 (1974), doi:10.7146/math.scand.a-11456, MR 0346492.
