= Radiation Therapy Oncology Group =

US research organization

- Abbreviation: RTOG
- Formation: 1968; 58 years ago
- Founder: Dr. Simon Kramer
- Headquarters: Philadelphia, Pennsylvania
- Fields: Cancer clinical research

The Radiation Therapy Oncology Group (RTOG), headquartered in Philadelphia, Pennsylvania, was organized in 1968 under the direction of Dr. Simon Kramer, also a principal founder. Since 1971, the RTOG has been funded and overseen by the National Cancer Institute.

The group is responsible for conducting radiation therapy research and clinical investigations in order to treat cancers, including endometrial and cervical cancer.

== History ==
Its first study was in 1968, an adjuvant methotrexate study for head and neck cancer. The methotrexate study employed combinations of radiation, methotrexate and surgery in the treatment of advanced head and neck cancer. 700 patients were used to this study clinical investigations in the area of head and neck cancer. In 2009, it was reported RTOG accrued a total of about 60,000 patients for studies. An academically controversial study RTOG published demonstrated good results for treating low-grade glioma, although as of 2015 this treatment was generally incompatible with chemotherapy options for treatment such as temozolomide.

RTOG headquarters are located at the offices of the American College of Radiology in Philadelphia, Pennsylvania.

In 2014, NRG Oncology was formed when RTOG merged with the National Surgical National Adjuvant Breast and Bowel Project (NSABP) and the Gynecologic Oncology Group (GOG).
