= Piers Nash =

Piers David Nash
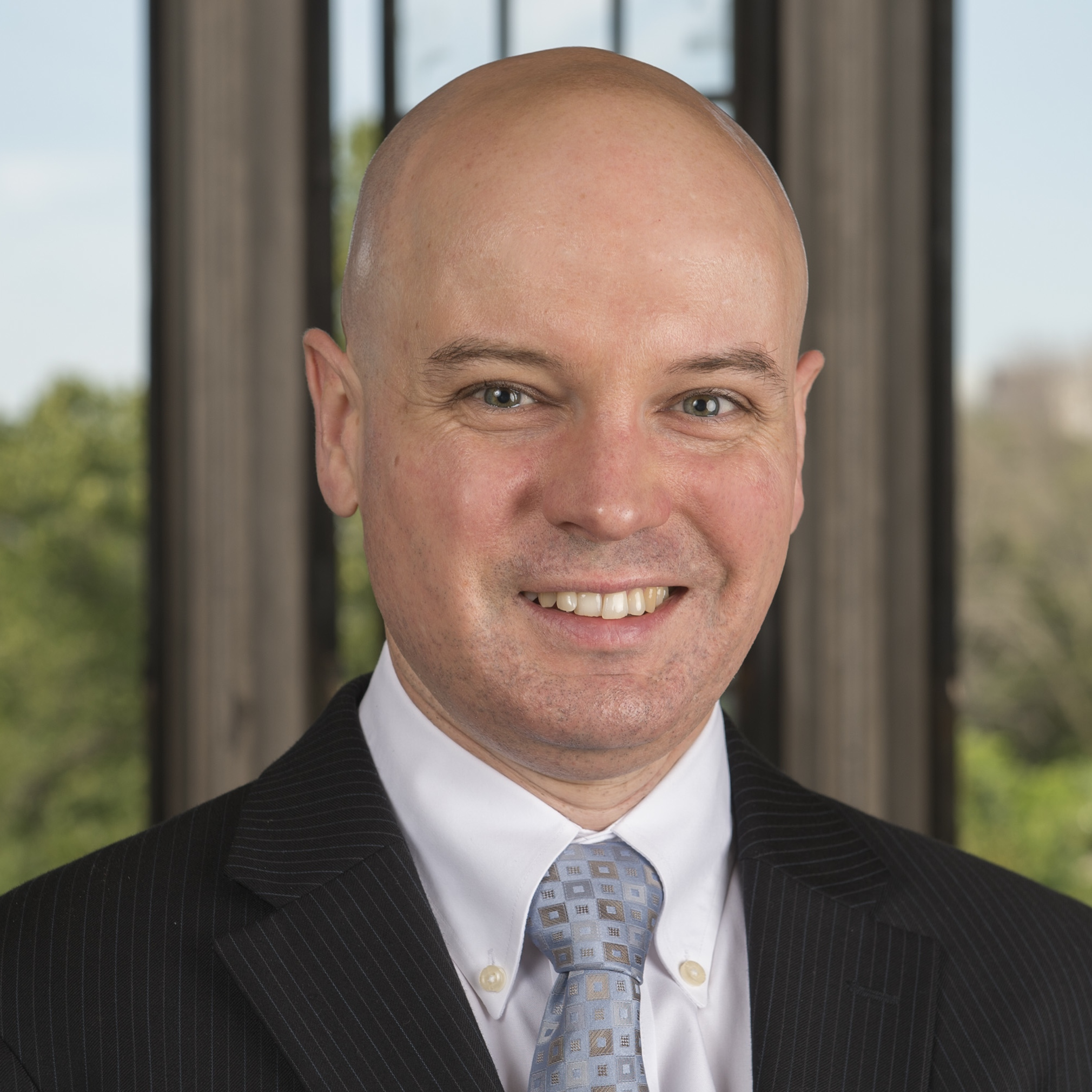
- Piers Nash
- Born: Exeter, England
- Education: University of Alberta; University of Guelph; Booth School of Business
- Known for: Cellular signal transduction
- Scientific career
- Fields: Biochemistry, cell biology
- Workplaces: University of Chicago
- Doctoral advisor: Grant McFadden

Piers David Nash is a writer, entrepreneur, cancer biology professor, data evangelist and technology futurist. He is a pioneer in the field of emergent properties of complex biological systems, particularly for his work on integrative all-or-none switches at a cellular level. He was the founder of Sympatic, and the son of academic Roger Nash.

== Early life and education ==
Born in Exeter, England, and grew up in Sudbury, Ontario, Canada. In high school he competed in the Canada-Wide Science Fair in five successive years (1983–87), winning awards on each occasion and becoming one of the most highly awarded science fair participants in the history of the fair. In recognition of this he was selected to represent Canada as one of two youth delegates to the 1985 Nobel Prize lectures and ceremony in Stockholm, Sweden as part of the Stockholm International Youth Science Seminar and was awarded the International Youth Year Ontario Gold Medal. He received a BSc with honours in biochemistry from the University of Guelph, and the Chemical Institute of Canada prize for the top of class and President's Scholarship. He received a PhD in 1999 from the University of Alberta working in the laboratory of Dr. Grant McFadden investigating poxviral immunomodulatory proteins. His doctoral thesis focused on the enzymology and biological properties of the Myxoma virus encoded serine proteinase inhibitor (serpin), SERP-1. He completed postdoctoral research with Anthony Pawson at the Samuel Lunenfeld Research Institute of Mount Sinai Hospital and the University of Toronto from June 1999 to December 2003. In 2014, Nash received an MBA with a concentration in finance awarded with high honors from the University of Chicago Booth School of Business.

== Career ==
Nash is Senior Director for Artificial Intelligence and Intelligent Automation at Farmers Insurance. Nash previously led Advanced Analytics and AI at Horace Mann Companies. Nash was founder and CEO of Sympatic Inc from 2019 to 2023, developing Cloud SaaS to power ethical data sharing for applications such as Artificial Intelligence. Nash has authored three patents on advanced multi-party rule-based secure cloud run-time environments that allow rule-based multi-party access or code access to data (link to patents). Sympatic holds trademarks for VirtualVault® and Ethical Data Sharing® based on Nash's work. Nash is Founder & General Manager of Nash Strategy & Innovation. He advises Fortune 500 technology companies and startups in the genomics, healthcare, data science and data storage fields. He serves on the Advisory Boards of technology and innovation companies. Nash was Managing Director at Health2047, the innovation enterprise of the American Medical Association from 2017–2018. From 2014 to 2017, Nash was Director of the Center for Data-Intensive Science at the University of Chicago that was building and managing the National Cancer Institute Genomic Data Commons with Robert Lee Grossman. He was founding strategy manager and Director of business and research development for the University of Chicago's Center for Data Intensive Science which developed the National Cancer Institute Genomic Data Commons. He was a professor in the Ben May Department for Cancer Research and a Scientist of the Comprehensive Cancer Center at the University of Chicago from 2004–2012 and a fellow of the Institute for Genomics and Systems Biology from 2006–2012. As a scientist, he investigates protein–protein interactions involved in signal transduction, and the molecular mechanisms by which cells respond to external cues. His work at the University of Chicago focused on understanding the SH2 domain at a systems level and investigating the role of ubiquitination in controlling endocytosis and modulating signal transduction. Nash was an early pioneer of the concept of Emergence in complex biological systems. His description of how complex protein interplay creates a digital switch guiding initiation of DNA replication published in Nature was a seminal advance covered as a breakthrough of the year by Science Signaling and remains extensively cited. This emergent properties of a complex system as the basis for ultrasensitivity (all-or-none switches) at critical junctures in the cell cycle remains a key example in this field.

ResearchGate reports 54 peer-reviewed published works in a wide range of fields, including signal transduction, cell biology, molecular evolution, cell cycle, cognition and memory, meteorology, and pedagogy.
