= Will Bartholomew =

American football player (born 1978)

Personal information
- Born: October 1, 1978 (age 48); Nashville, Tennessee, U.S.

Career information
- College: Tennessee
- NFL draft: 2001: undrafted

Career history
- Denver Broncos (2001)*
- * Offseason or practice squad member only

Will Bartholomew (born October 1, 1978) is an American former football fullback.

== Playing history ==
=== College ===
Bartholomew played college football for the Tennessee Volunteers football team, earning many honors including 2001 SEC Good Works Team, Verizon Academic All-District IV, Academic All-SEC; 2000 Academic All-SEC; 1999 Academic All-SEC; and 1998 Academic All-SEC. He was a captain on the 1998 National Championship winning team that went 13–0 with a victory over Florida State in the Fiesta Bowl. He functioned primarily as a "blocking" back for the team.

=== Professional ===
As an undrafted free agent, Bartholomew was to play in the National Football League for the Denver Broncos. Bartholomew's career ended after suffering a knee injury during training camp that required multiple extensive surgeries. He founded a sports training facility after retiring from football.

== Personal life ==
Bartholomew's brother, Ben, also played for the Tennessee Volunteers.
