= E. D. Blodgett =

Canadian poet, literary critic, and translator (1935–2018)

Edward Dickinson Blodgett (26 February 1935 – 15 November 2018) was a Canadian poet, literary critic, and translator who won the Governor General's Award for poetry in 1996 for his collection Apostrophes: Woman at a Piano (BuschekBooks).

== Biography ==
Born in Philadelphia and educated at Rutgers University, E. D. Blodgett emigrated to Canada in 1966 to work as a literature professor at the University of Alberta. With his book, Configuration (1982) and other articles Blodgett became instrumental in promoting Comparative Canadian Literature and extending the binary model (English-French) of the Sherbrooke School of Comparative Canadian Literature begun by Ronald Sutherland with Second Image: Comparative Studies in Quebec/Canadian Literature (1971). Because of his knowledge of different languages and literatures Blodgett was able to be more inclusive in his study of Canadian authors from different backgrounds beyond the English and the French. This pluralistic approach is evident in his Five-Part Invention (2003) which deals with many ethnic minority writers in Canada.

In 2015, Blodgett published translations of the Persian poet Rumi, Speak Only of the Moon: A New Translation of Rumi, edited with Manijeh Mannani.

In 1996, Blodgett won the Governor-General's Award in Poetry for Apostrophes: woman at a piano (1996).

In 1999, Blodgett along with Jacques Brault won the Governor-General's Award for Translation for Transfiguration (1998), a translation of Blodgett's poetry.

On July 1, 2007, E.D. Blodgett was appointed the post of Poet Laureate for the City of Edmonton, Alberta. Blodgett moved to South Surrey, British Columbia where he remained until his death in 2018.

== Poetry ==
- Take away the names (1975)
- Sounding (1977)
- Beast Gate (1980)
- Arché/Elegies (1983)
- Musical Offering (1986)
- Da Capo (1990)
- Apostrophes: Woman at a Piano (1996)
- Apostrophes II: through you I (1998)
- Transfiguration (1998) translation by Jacques Brault
- Apostrophes III: Alone Upon the Earth (1999)
- Apostrophes IV: speaking you is holiness (2000)
- Ark of Koans (2003)
- Apostrophes V: never born except within the other (2003)
- Apostrophes VI: open the grass (2004)
- Elegy (2005)
- In the heart of the wood (2005)
- Practices of eternity (2005)
- A Pirouette and Gone (2006)
- The Invisible Poem (2008)
- Poems for a Small Park (2008)
- Praha (2011)
- Apostrophes VII: Sleep, You, a Tree (2011)
- as if (2014)
- Songs for Dead Children (2018)
- Apostrophes VIII: Nothing Is But You and I (2019)
- Walking Into God (2024)

== Literary Criticism and Translations ==
- Configuration. Essays in the Canadian Literatures (1982)
- D. G. Jones and his Works (1984)
- The Love Songs of the Carmina Burana (1987) with Roy Arthur Swanson
- Alice Munro (1988)
- Romance of Flamenca (1995)
- Five Part Invention: A History of Literary History in Canada (2005)
