= Takahiko Masuda =

Takahiko Masuda (増田 貴彦, Masuda Takahiko) is a cultural psychologist and professor of psychology at the University of Alberta. Masuda received his B.A. from Hokkaido University in 1993, M.A from Kyoto university in 1996 under the supervision of Shinobu Kitayama, and later received his PhD from the University of Michigan where his adviser was Richard E. Nisbett. In perhaps his most popular study, Masuda displayed a series of images with characters of varied emotional expression. There was a distinct measurable difference in the way North Americans and Japanese perceived the emotion of the central figure of the image, such that for North Americans the perception of the emotion of the central figure was not affected by whether or not the figures in the background showed a congruent emotion. Whereas the Japanese participants were markedly influenced in their judgement of the central figures emotional state depending on the emotional states of the surrounding figure.

== Selected publications ==
- Masuda, T., Li, L. M. W., Russell, M. J. & Lee, H. (2019). Perception and cognition. In S. Kitayama & D. Cohen (Eds.), Handbook of cultural psychology (Second Edition), pp. 222-245. New York: Guilford Press
- Masuda, T. (2017). Culture and attention: Recent empirical findings and new directions in cultural psychology. Social and Personality Psychology Compass, 11(12), e12363. DOI: 10.1111/spc3.12363.
- Imai, M., Kanero, J., & Masuda, T. (2016). The relation between language, culture, and thought: Discussions on the need for an interdisciplinary approach. Current Opinion in Psychology, 8, 70-77.
- Masuda, T., & Yamagishi, T, (2010). Bunka Shinri Gaku, Jyokan & Gekan [Cultural psychology, Vol. 1 & Vol. 2]. Tokyo: Baihukan. (in Japanese).
- Masuda, T., Gonzalez, R. Kwan, L., & Nisbett, R. E. (2008). Culture and aesthetic preference: Comparing the attention to context of East Asians and European Americans. Personality and Social Psychology Bulletin, 34, 1260–1275
- Masuda, T., Ellsworth, P. C., Mesquita, B., Leu, J., Tanida, S., & van de Veerdonk, E. (2008). Placing the face in context: Cultural differences in the perception of facial emotion. Journal of Personality and Social Psychology, 94, 365-38
- Masuda, T. & Nisbett, R. E. (2006). Culture and change blindness. Cognitive Sciences, 30, 381-399.
- Nisbett, R. E., & Masuda, T. (2003). Culture and point of view. Proceedings of the National Academy of Sciences of the United States of America, 100, 11163-11175.
- Masuda, T. & Nisbett, R. E. (2001). Attending holistically vs. analytically: Comparing the context Sensitivity of Japanese and Americans. Journal of Personality and Social Psychology, 81, 922-934.

== Awards ==
- Book of the Year Award, The Japanese Society of Social Psychology Book of the Year Award (2010)
- Brickman Memorial Award, University of Michigan (2001)
- Japanese Psychological Association Award for International Contributions to Psychology (2010)
- APS Fellow, Association for Psychological Science (2022)

== Lab ==
Masuda runs an active research lab at the University of Alberta, where he supervises a number of graduate and undergraduate research projects while conducting his own research.

== Affiliations ==
- American Psychological Society
- Cognitive Science Society
- Canadian Psychological Association
- Japanese Psychological Association
- Society of Personality and Social Psychology
