= Shelley Moore (educator) =

Canadian educator

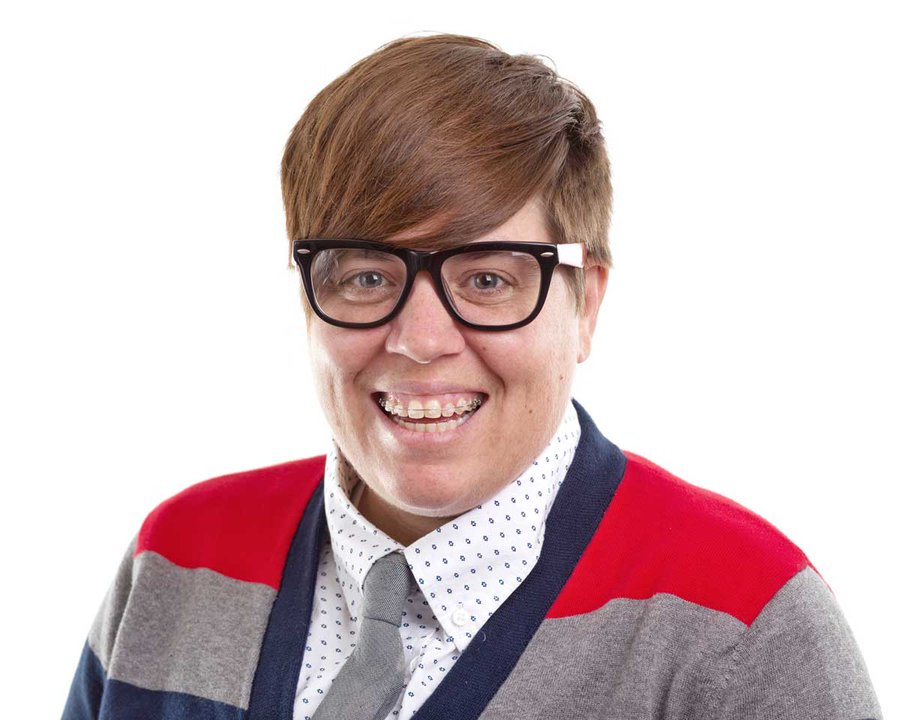
- Born: Edmonton, Alberta, Canada
- Citizenship: Canadian

Academic background
- Education: University of Alberta (BEd); Simon Fraser University (MEd); University of British Columbia (PhD)

Academic work
- Discipline: Special education, Inclusive education
- Institutions: Richmond School District
- Main interests: Inclusive education, Individualized Education Programs, intellectual and developmental disabilities
- Notable works: *One Without the Other: Stories of Unity Through Diversity and Inclusion* (2016); *5 Moore Minutes* (video series, 2018–2019)

Dr. Shelley Moore is a Canadian educator and an expert on special education. A teacher and researcher, she advocates for inclusive education and seeks to reform Individualized Education Programs to better suit the needs of individual students. Based in the province of British Columbia, she has worked on special education reform for several Canadian provincial governments. In 2016, she published a book on the subject entitled One Without the Other.

== Education ==
Originally from Edmonton, Alberta, Moore received a bachelor's degree in Special Education from the University of Alberta. From 2016, after obtaining a master's degree from Simon Fraser University, she began research towards a doctorate funded by the Social Sciences and Humanities Research Council at the University of British Columbia. Her research topic is the inclusive education of students with intellectual and developmental disabilities.

Dr. Moore received her Ph.D from the University of British Columbia in 2023. Her award-winning Ph.D. dissertation investigated how to support teachers to increase access to secondary grade-level academic curriculum for students with intellectual disabilities. She now draws from her experience as a student, teacher, and researcher to advocate and promote inclusion and equity for all learners.

== Career as an educator ==
After finishing her education, Moore worked for two years as a teacher in The Bronx, New York City. When working in Richmond, British Columbia, Moore developed an interest in advancing the education of those with intellectual and developmental disabilities and later became an education consultant for Richmond School District. Working with the governments of the Canadian provinces of Alberta, Ontario, and British Columbia, Moore advocates for improvements to the provision of special education. Having gathered insights on a visit to Denmark, Moore spent seven years campaigning in the province of Manitoba to reform Individualized Education Programs so as to better reflect students' individual needs.

In her work as an educational consultant, she espouses the implementation of Universal Design for Learning, which incorporates students' individual requirements into the planning of lessons and curriculums. During the 2018–19 school year, Moore and the government of British Columbia developed a series of instructional videos under the title 5 Moore Minutes. The production was designed to "provide practical strategies of effective design and teaching practices" for inclusive education. In 2016, she published a book on inclusive education entitled One Without the Other. In January 2016, she spoke at a TEDx event on the future of education held in Langley, British Columbia.

== Select publications ==
- One Without the Other: Stories of Unity Through Diversity and Inclusion. Winnipeg, Manitoba: Portage and Main Press. 2016. ISBN 978-1553796589.
