= Christopher Field =

American scientist

Christopher B. Field
- Born: March 12, 1953 (age 73)
- Education: Harvard College (AB); Stanford University (PhD)
- Occupation: Scientist
- Employer: Stanford University Woods Institute for the Environment
- Board member of: World Wildlife Fund; California Academy of Sciences
- Awards: Heinz Award(2009); Max Planck Research Award(2013); BBVA Foundation Frontiers of Knowledge Award(2013); Roger Revelle Medal(2014); Stephen H. Schneider Award(2015); Japan Prize(2022)
- Honours: Member of the US National Academy of Sciences; Member of the American Academy of Arts and Sciences

Christopher B. Field is an American scientist and researcher, who has contributed to the field of climate change. The author of more than 300 scientific publications, Field's research emphasizes impacts of climate change, from the molecular to the global scale. His work includes major field experiments on responses of California grassland to multi-factor global change, integrative studies on the global carbon cycle, and assessments of impacts of climate change on agriculture. Field's work with models includes studies on the global distribution of carbon sources and sinks, and studies on environmental consequences of expanding biomass energy.

== Biography ==
Field was born in California in 1953. He grew up in California, Arizona and Wyoming, with his family moving around during his childhood in order to find the best locations for his father's sawmill. He describes most of his childhood memories as being associated with the wilderness. During junior high school, Field was inspired by "Walden" by Henry David Thoreau; he had a copy of the book that he would frequently annotate. He was a National Merit Scholar in high school.

In 1975, Field graduated summa cum laude from Harvard College with a bachelor's degree in biology. He then went to Stanford University, where he received a PhD in biological sciences in 1981. His dissertation Carbon gain consequences of leaf aging in a California shrub focused on how a leaf interacts with the rest of the plant's functions as a whole, as well as how to use data from leaves to measure photosynthesis in the surrounding environment. Field said he chose his thesis because of his curiosity for "how large parts of the Earth system are built from small pieces." He later credited this research on different biological scales as what led him to the carbon cycle and his work surrounding climate change.

As my work on scaling progressed, it ran quickly into the conclusion that the Earth is changing. Not only through big changes in climate, but also big changes in land use and the composition of the atmosphere, with more and more effects on plants and animals.

— Christopher Field

From 1981 to 1984, Field was an associate professor of biology at the University of Utah. He became a staff scientist for the Carnegie Institution for Science in 1984 and in 1986 started working as an assistant professor at Stanford.

In 2002, Field founded Carnegie's Department of Global Ecology. This was the first new department to be established at the Carnegie Institute in 70 years.

In 2005, Field became faculty director of the Jasper Ridge Biological Reserve, a nature preserve run by Stanford. He worked to integrate Jasper Ridge with the main Stanford campus as director. While there, Field published 78 articles about his research at Jasper Ridge, more than any other individual.

He was one of the inaugural Fellows of the Ecological Society of America, elected in 2012.

Field was the 2014 recipient of the Roger Revelle Medal of the American Geophysical Union.

Since 2016, Field has served as director of the Stanford Woods Institute for the Environment. His research "focuses on climate change, especially solutions that improve lives now, decrease the amount of future warming, and support vibrant economies." Field's recent work has been centered around coastal flooding and wildfires, the latter being something California has seen an increase in over recent years.

== IPCC and 2007 Nobel Peace Prize ==
Field worked for the United Nations as part of the Intergovernmental Panel on Climate Change (IPCC) when the organization received the 2007 Nobel Peace Prize. The award was given to all of the scientists who contributed to IPCC reports "for their efforts to build up and disseminate greater knowledge about man-made climate change, and to lay the foundations for the measures that are needed to counteract such change." Field received a medal and a personalized reproduction of the Nobel Peace Prize diploma, saying he was "blown away" that the IPCC won.

Field served as co-chair of IPCC Working Group II from 2008 to 2015. In February 2015, the US State Department named him as one of the candidates for IPCC Chair. The position ultimately went to Korean economist Hoesung Lee.

== Personal life ==
Field is married with two adult children. His wife is also a scientist and works at Stanford's nature preserve. Neither of Field's children work in science; he said, "My child-rearing philosophy was to encourage them to pursue the things that interest them the most. I'd love to see the world with more scientists, but we also need people in lots of other professions."

Field regularly walks or bikes to where he needs to go. In 2014, he said that he and his wife had spent the last several years "restoring an old house to very high standards of energy efficiency." He also enjoys going for hikes and being out in nature.
