= Ravi S. Menon =

Canadian biophysicist

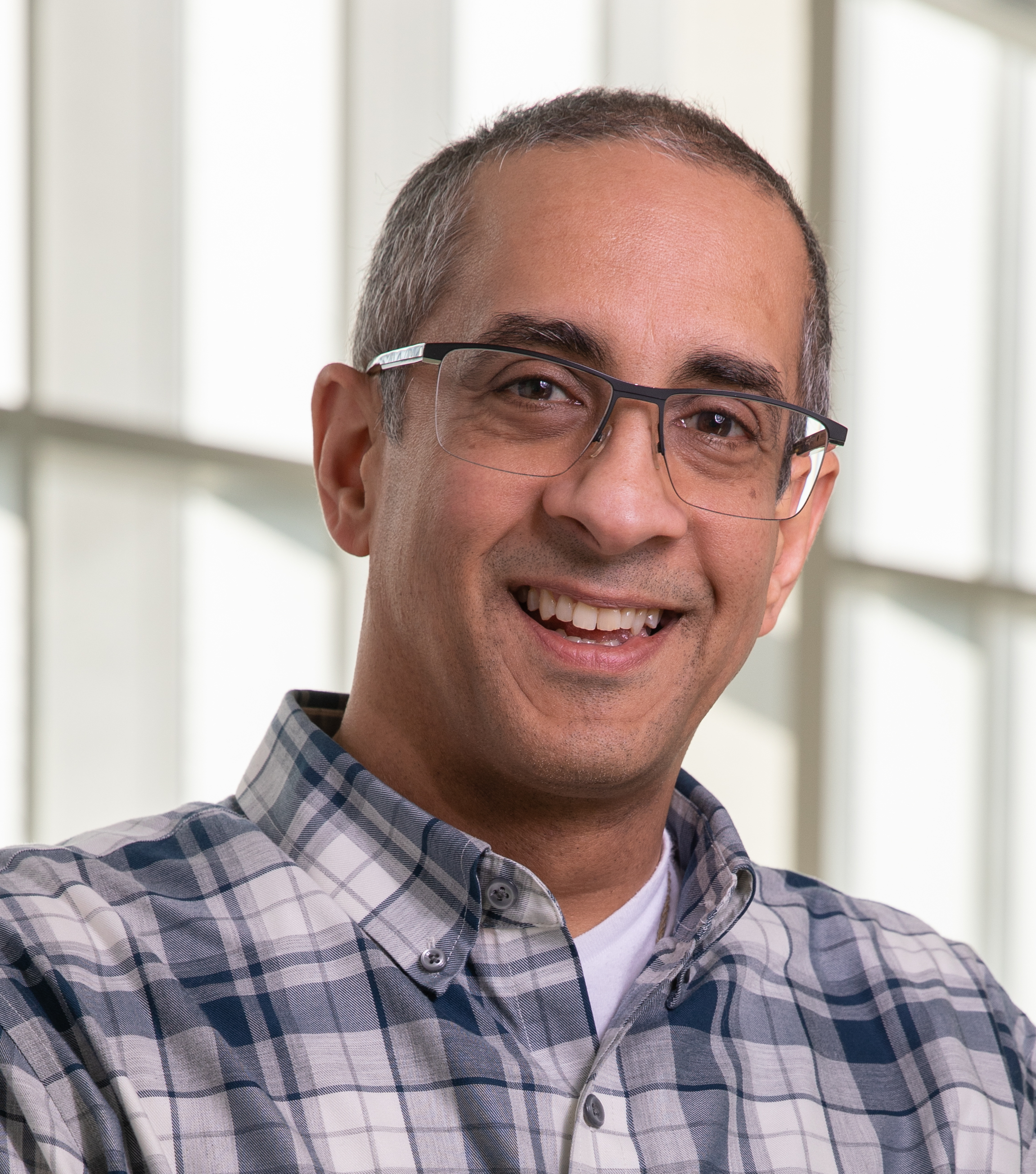
- Born: 1964 (age 61–62); Elkins, West Virginia, USA
- Spouse: Anne J. Menon
- Parent(s): Thuppalay Kochu Menon and Rama Menon

Academic background
- Education: BSc, Physics Honours, University of British Columbia; MSc(A), Medical Physics, McGill University; PhD, 1990, University of Alberta
- Thesis: Some mechanisms of water proton NMR relaxation in model tissue systems. (1990)

Academic work
- Institutions: University of Western Ontario

Ravi Shankar Menon FRSC FCAHS (born 1964) is a Canadian-American biophysicist. He is a former Tier 1 Canada Research Chair in Functional Magnetic Resonance Imaging at the University of Western Ontario and director of the Centre for Functional and Metabolic Mapping at the Robarts Research Institute.

== Early life and education ==
Menon was born in 1964 and lived in West Virginia, Virginia, Hawaii, Bombay and Maryland before graduating from University Hill Secondary School in Vancouver, British Columbia. He was born into an academic family as his mother was an electrical engineer and his father was an astronomer. Menon completed his entire post-secondary education in Canada. His Bachelor of Science degree was at the University of British Columbia, his Master of Science degree was at McGill University, and his PhD was at the University of Alberta. His thesis at the University of Alberta was conducted under the supervision of Peter S. Allen in 1990 and titled Some mechanisms of water proton NMR relaxation in model tissue systems. Following this, Menon completed his post-doctoral fellowship at the University of Minnesota where he was heavily involved in the development of a brain imaging technique called Functional Magnetic Resonance Imaging (fMRI) with Seiji Ogawa and David W. Tank of Bell Labs and Menon's post-doctoral supervisor, Kamil Ugurbil. The aim of the technique was to measure changing blood flow and oxygenation to observe brain function.

== Career ==
Following his post-doctoral fellowship, Menon joined the Robarts Research Institute to develop techniques to gather better images of the brain with MRIs through fMRI. By 2002, Menon was an associate professor in the Department of Diagnostic Radiology and Nuclear Medicine at the University of Western Ontario (UWO) and held a Canada Research Chair in Functional Neuroimaging. In these roles, Menon continued his research into fMRI and led a laboratory at the Robarts Research Institute. As a result of his research, Menon was named one of Canada's Top 20 researchers aged 40 and under in 2002. Following this, Menon was appointed a Tier 1 Canada Research Chair in Functional and Molecular Imaging in 2005. While working in this role, Menon was named a member of the steering committee that established the Canadian Action and Perception Network (CAPnet) between York University, Queen's University at Kingston, and UWO. The aim of the iniatiative was to "understand how the brain works, especially in human movement control and perception, and how disease and injury can disrupt these functions." In 2009, he was again recognized amongst the top 40 researchers under the age of 40.

Following the renewal of his Tier 1 Canada Research Chair, Menon collaborated with PhD candidate Matthew Quinn to discover if iron deposits in the brain are a cause or consequence of Multiple Sclerosis. They published a study in 2013 that suggested that iron deposits in deep gray matter occur very early on in the disease course. Based on this research, Menon then developed a new technique to track the progression of Multiple Sclerosis by measuring damage in specific areas of the brain called Quantitative Susceptibility Magnetic Resonance Imaging. His contributions to advancements in fMRI and ultra-high-field MRI were later recognized with an election of Fellowship to the International Society for Magnetic Resonance in Medicine and Canadian Academy of Health Sciences.

In July 2017, Menon was named Co-Scientific Director of BrainsCAN at UWO with Lisa Saksida. While working in his new role, Menon began to publish his research on concussions among young athletes who play ice hockey and rugby. In October 2017, he compared MRI brain scans from 17 Bantam-level hockey players who suffered a concussion compared to similarly aged non-concussed players. This subsequently raised concerns about the concussion protocols in youth hockey. Menon later revealed that there were significant structural and functional changes to the brain between concussed players and non-concussed. In 2019, Menon was elected a fellow of the Royal Society of Canada for being a "pioneer in the use of MRI for structural and functional brain imaging."
