= Thomas Rockwell Mackie =

Thomas “Rock” Mackie is a medical physicist.

He grew up in Saskatoon and received his undergraduate degree in Physics from the University of Saskatchewan in 1980. He went on to earn his doctorate in Physics at the University of Alberta in 1984. His expertise is in radiation therapy treatment planning and intensity modulated radiation therapy. He is a primary inventor and algorithm designer of the helical tomotherapy concept. Mackie is a professor in the departments of Medical Physics, Human Oncology, Biomedical Engineering and Engineering Physics at the University of Wisconsin–Madison. He has over 150 peer-reviewed publications, over 15 patents, and has been the supervisor for dozens of Ph.D. students. Mackie is a Fellow of the American Association of Physicists in Medicine and a member at large of that organization’s Science Council. He is also the Vice-Chair of the University of Wisconsin–Madison Calibration Laboratory. Mackie serves as President of the John R. Cameron Medical Physics Foundation, a non-profit organization that supports the UW Medical Physics Department, medical physics in the developing world and high school science scholarships in high schools in the Greater Madison region. Mackie is a member of the board of the Wisconsin Biomedical and Medical Device Association.

Mackie was a founder of Geometrics Corporation (now owned by Philips Medical Systems) which developed the Pinnacle treatment planning system which still operates its Research and Development facility in Madison, Wisconsin. He is also a founder and chairman of the board of TomoTherapy, Incorporated, an international company listed on the NASDAQ stock exchange under the symbol TOMO, employing over 700 people based out of Madison, WI, USA.

In 2002, Mackie was one of six Wisconsin regional winners of the Ernst & Young Entrepreneur of the Year awards. Mackie is a member and Vice-Chair of the International Commission on Radiation Units and Measurements (ICRU).
