= Forced normalization =

Term in neuropsychiatry

Forced Normalization (FN) is a psychiatric phenomenon in which a long term episodic epilepsy or migraine disorder is treated, and, although the electroencephalogram (EEG) appears to have stabilized, acute behavioral, mood, and psychological disturbances begin to manifest. If, or when, treatment for the disorder is halted, the disturbances go away, but the episodic spikes on the EEG reappear. H. Landolt coined the term 'Forced Normalization' in 1953 in response to a change he witnessed in epileptic EEGs, which monitor electrical activity in the brain. These changes were followed by abrupt behavioral changes in the patient. Landolt concluded that forced normalization is "the phenomenon characterized by the fact that, with the occurrence of psychotic states, the electroencephalography becomes more normal or entirely normal, as compared with previous and subsequent EEG findings." Forced normalization, as described by Landolt, was therefore an electrophysiological phenomenon with the electroencephalograph at its helm.

Tellenbach's description of "alternative psychosis" or the reciprocal relationship between abnormal mental states and seizures differed from Landolt's in its clinical rather than EEG description. Subsequently, this concept was refined by Wolf, who suggested that the term "paradoxical normalization" was more appropriate and closer to what Landolt intended, wherein both inhibitory processes and epileptic processes (subcortical and restricted) are active at the same time.

Researchers have been rallying for the broadening of the FN diagnostic criteria to include more episodic disorders than just epilepsy. It was recently discovered that FN can and has occurred in instances of chronic migraine attacks. This called into question not only the diagnostic criteria, but also which treatments will treat the most patients the most efficiently.

== Forced normalization in epilepsy ==
Forced Normalization was first identified in 1953 and was believed to affect only epileptic patients. Though the converse nature of FN and epilepsy remains puzzling, the link between mental health conditions and epilepsy itself proved unsurprising to scientists. A systematic review compounded data from thousands of instances of FN and each patient's treatment. One of the patterns identified was that the comorbidity of psychiatric symptoms in epilepsy is significantly higher by calling upon the rate of schizophrenia in epilepsy patients, which is double that of the general population. Furthermore, it found that the concomitance is highly dependent on the type of epilepsy a patient has: temporal lobe and cerebellum central epilepsy tend to be more susceptible to psychiatric behavioral disorders.

FN in epilepsy patients has historically been treated using pharmacological stimulation, but electrical therapy has been utilized, though uncommon. In more severe cases, pharmacological stimuli improved the induced psychosis. However, in the systematic review discussed previously, researchers found that pharmacological stimulation proved ineffective in a range of cases. In fact, the most effective way to stop the psychosis was to completely halt epileptic treatment. In one study, researchers combined pharmacological and electrical stimulation in an attempt to treat FN patients' psychosis without having to halt antiepileptic treatments. While this method did reduce the frequency and severity of seizures, the psychotic symptoms in the patients worsened. This led researchers to the conclusion that the pathophysiological antagonism that electrical and pharmacological stimuli are capable of may render them incompatible for combined use in treating FN.

== Forced normalization in Migraines ==
The occurrence of FN in migraine patients was discovered much more recently, and continues to be the topic of much scholarly debate. The most significant question is whether or not the FN diagnostic criteria should be broadened to include these psychiatric disturbances in any episodic disorder. Antonio Russo et al. were the first researchers to report on an instance of FN in migraine. In this instance, the pattern of episodic disorder remission and abrupt manifestation of psychiatric behaviors that are present in epileptic cases of FN mirrored that of their migraine patient. These scholars were able to link the disturbance to FN, even though there had never been a case of FN in migraines. This is not only because of similarities in symptoms, but also because of the similarities in neuronal activity these episodic disorders share.

A point of reason to broaden the diagnostic criteria for FN is the similar locations of neuroelectrical activity during the psychosis, regardless of whether a patient has epilepsy or migraines. Thus far, in both migraine and epileptic cases of FN, the psychosis that develops is hypothesized to be rooted largely in non limbic structures of the brain, like the amygdala, cerebrum, and olfactory bulb. Both antiepileptic drugs (AEDs) and antimigraine medications do not affect these areas and, therefore, do not affect psychiatric activity. Yet, these medications still normalize the episodic activity on the EEG, creating the phenomenon of FN. This points to the commonalities in the activity of non limbic areas of the brain, rather than the type of episodic disorder of the patient. Migraine researchers believe the primary focus of the diagnosis of FN should be placed on the activity in the cerebral cortex, as well as the psychiatric and behavioral changes that occur in a patient.

== New treatments ==
Due to the neuroelectrical similarities of FN in migraines and epilepsy, researchers have begun to theorize about new treatment methods. These new treatments could encompass more instances of FN, rather than cases solely in epilepsy patients. While commonly utilized to treat independent instances of mood disorders and psychosis, electroconvulsive therapy has yet to be used alone to treat FN. Due to pathophysiological similarities in the psychosis caused by FN and nonconcurrent psychosis, researchers have begun to theorize about the success of electrical stimulation alone in treating FN. In a case study, two patients with debilitating psychosis were followed. Both of the patients had no history of epilepsy or migraines. Yet, the patients each experienced one or more naturally occurring seizures, and their psychosis was largely alleviated after the occurrence of such. Researchers gathered from this occurrence that the episodic activity in the brain caused by epilepsy may be exactly what wards off psychosis: when patients' seizures go into remission, the psychosis emerges. These researchers hypothesize about the efficiency of electroconvulsive therapy, or some form of clinically induced seizures, to treat the psychosis without having to stop AED or antimigraine therapy. Furthermore, based on the pathophysiological similarities in both epilepsy and migraines and the regions of the brain the concurrent psychoses effect, a theoretical electrical treatment could be the jumping off point for an all encompassing treatment plan of FN.
