= Marie Moser =

Canadian writer

Marie Moser (born 1948) is a Canadian novelist and short-story writer residing in Edmonton, Alberta.

Moser is best known for her 1987 novel Counterpoint, which won her the eighth New Alberta Novel Competition in 1986, and a prize of $4,000 given by Alberta Culture and Irwin Publishers. Although it was originally published in English (Irwin, 1987), it has since been published in two editions in the French language (under the title Courtepointe) (Éditions Québec/Amérique, 1991 and Edition du Club Québec loisirs, 1991). Counterpoint is a story of three generations of French Canadian women and the manner in which their lives interweave in imperceptible and yet intrinsic ways. Despite winning an award, Counterpoint also received a negative review in the Toronto Star, which said that Moser's first novel lacked "narrative skill".

Moser's short stories have been published in a wide array of collections, magazines, and compendiums, and some have been broadcast on the radio.

== Biography ==
Moser was born in 1948, and was raised in Edmonton. She studied chemistry and Canadian history and is an alumnus of the University of Alberta (B.Sc., B.A. and M.A.). She also studied creative writing under Marian Engel and Rudy Wiebe, both notable Alberta writers. She is married (Jerry) and has four children.
