= Politics of Alberta =

- Coat of arms of Alberta
- Polity type: Province within a federal parliamentary constitutional monarchy
- Constitution: Constitution of Canada

Legislative branch
- Name: Legislature: Legislative Assembly
- Type: Unicameral
- Meeting place: Alberta Legislature Building, Edmonton
- Presiding officer: Speaker of the Legislative Assembly

Executive branch
- Head of state
- Currently: King Charles III represented by Salma Lakhani, Lieutenant Governor
- Head of government
- Currently: Premier; Danielle Smith
- Appointer: Lieutenant Governor
- Cabinet
- Name: Executive Council
- Leader: Premier (as President of the Executive Council)
- Appointer: Lieutenant Governor
- Headquarters: Edmonton
- Ministries: 26

Judicial branch
- Court of Appeal
- Chief judge: Ritu Khullar
- Seat: Law Courts, Edmonton
- Court of King's Bench
- Chief judge: Kent H. Davidson
- Seat: Edmonton
- Provincial Court
- Seat: Edmonton

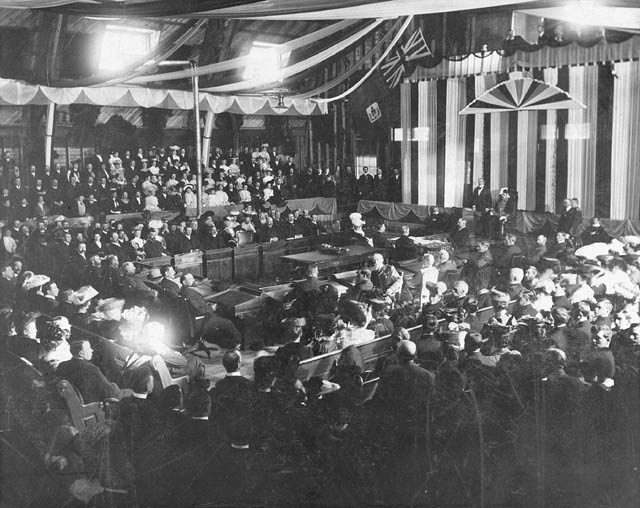
Alberta's first Legislature, Edmonton, 1906

The politics of Alberta are centred on a provincial government resembling that of the other Canadian provinces, namely a constitutional monarchy and parliamentary democracy. The capital of the province is Edmonton, where the provincial Legislative Building is located.

The unicameral legislature, the Alberta Legislature, is composed of the Lieutenant Governor and the Legislative Assembly, which has 87 members. Government is conducted after the Westminster model. Alberta has a single-tier system of municipal government similar to that of most of the other provinces.

== Lieutenant governor ==
Charles III, King of Canada, is also the sovereign for Alberta's provincial jurisdiction. Within Canada, the monarch exercises power individually on behalf of the federal government, and the 10 provinces. The powers of the Crown are vested in the monarch and are exercised by the lieutenant governor.

While the advice of the premier and Executive Council is typically binding on the lieutenant governor, there are occasions when the lieutenant governor has refused advice. This usually occurs if the premier does not clearly command the confidence of the elected Legislative Assembly, or if the advice or legislation would be unconstitutional.

In 2022, Lieutenant Governor Salma Lakhani identified the constitutional role of the lieutenant governor as the most important part of the job. She stated "We are a constitutional monarchy, and this is where we do checks and balances. I’m what I would call a ‘constitutional fire extinguisher.’ We don't have to use it a lot, but sometimes we do have to use it," in response to a proposed "Alberta Sovereignty Act" if it was determined to be unconstitutional. The proposed law would give the province the ability to ignore federal legislation it does not agree with.

== Legislative power ==
The Legislative Assembly of Alberta is the deliberative assembly of the Alberta Legislature, and is seated at the Alberta Legislature Building in the provincial capital of Edmonton. The Legislative Assembly is a unicameral assembly of 87 members, elected first past the post from single-member electoral districts. Bills passed by the legislature are given royal assent by Charles III, King of Canada, represented by the lieutenant governor of Alberta. The current Legislature is the 31st since Alberta entered Confederation under the Alberta Act in 1905, and is composed of members elected in the May 2023 general election, and returned a majority parliament controlled by the United Conservative Party (UCP).

== Executive power ==
The day-to-day operation and activities of the Government of Alberta are performed by the provincial departments and agencies, staffed by the non-partisan public service, and directed by the elected government.

The premier of Alberta is the primary minister of the Crown. The premier acts as the head of government for the province, chairs and selects the membership of the Cabinet, and advises the Crown on the exercise of executive power and much of the royal prerogative.

== History of Alberta politics ==
=== Provincial ===
Alberta's parliamentary governments are determined by general elections held every three to five years. Five years is the maximum term allowed. By-elections are conducted between the general elections to fill seats left vacant by death or resignation. In each election (so far) a single party has taken a majority of the seats, although sometimes it does this after receiving less than half the votes cast.

Alberta's politics has historically been one of long-lasting governments with government changes being few and far between.

For the first 16 years Alberta was a province it had a Liberal government. Through the 1910s the growing farmer movement forced reforms out of this government and, embodied in the United Farmers of Alberta group, it launched itself into direct politics, winning power in the first election it contested.

Louise McKinney and Roberta MacAdams were the first women elected to the Legislative Assembly, in the 1917 election. They were also the first women in any legislature of the British Empire. Irene Parlby was the first woman appointed to the provincial Cabinet, in 1921.

Alberta was swept up in the wave of "prairie populism" that took place after the First World War; from 1921 to 1935 the United Farmers of Alberta headed the longest-lived of the farmers' governments that won power in Canada during this time. It made several reforms including changing Alberta's election system. Ranked voting was brought in – single transferable voting proportional representation in the cities and instant-runoff voting outside the cities. The UFA lost all its seats in 1935 when William Aberhart's Social Credit party (Socred) was elected on a radical monetary reform platform. After Aberhart's death in 1943 and changing economic conditions, the Socred government moved to the right under Premier Ernest Manning.

For over 80 years, the province was governed by right of centre parties. The Socreds were succeeded in 1971 by the Progressive Conservatives. Ralph Klein was premier of Alberta from 1992 to 2006 and despite multiple controversies, he remained the leader of the Progressive Conservative party and thus the province although only 55 percent of delegates from his party signified their approval of his leadership on the spring of 2006, pushing him into retirement. In the previous election (2004) Klein's PC party had taken less than half the votes cast in the province but had won 75 percent of the seats.

Left wing Edmonton was an exception to the province's post–Second World War conservative voting pattern, earning it the nickname "Redmonton". Edmonton city residents, to a larger extent than elsewhere, tend to vote for the Liberal Party of Alberta and Alberta New Democrats. Their preferences is often obscured by the first-past-the-post electoral system. No Labour or CCF or NDP candidate won an Edmonton seat from 1955 to 1982, despite the large left vote in the city overall, in part due to the cancellation of the STV/IRV voting systems in 1956. The 2004 provincial election was an example of how the city got its nickname "Redmonton"; Liberal and New Democrat candidates won 15 of the city's 18 seats.

While Tories won 13 of Edmonton's 18 seats in 2008, Klein's successor, Ed Stelmach, represented a riding just outside Edmonton and was perceived to be less connected to the interests of the energy corporations whose headquarters are in Calgary.

Stelmach gave way in 2011 to Alison Redford, the province's first female premier. She led the Tories to a 12th consecutive election victory in 2012. Redford was forced to resign in 2014, and was ultimately succeeded by former federal minister Jim Prentice.

The period of conservative dominance in Alberta politics was broken in 2015 when the Alberta New Democratic Party formed government for the first time, and Rachel Notley became Alberta's 17th premier. The NDP won 54 of Alberta's 87 seats.

The 2019 general election saw Jason Kenney and his new United Conservative Party (a merger of the Progressive Conservative and Wildrose parties) sweep to power. The UCP won 63 of 87 seats in the Alberta legislature, returning the province to conservative politics. This was the only election in Alberta history to dethrone an incumbent government after only a single term. However, the UCP received just 54 percent of the vote, the first-past-the-post system inflating the avalanche of switched seats and exaggerating the appearance of the party's popularity. In the 2023 general election, the UCP won another majority but by smaller margins – UCP 49 seats, NDP 38 seats; UCP 53 percent of votes, NDP 44 percent of votes cast overall.

=== Federal ===
When first MPs were elected in what is present-day Alberta in 1880s/1890s, Calgary and southern Alberta generally elected Conservatives, such as Donald Watson Davis and north-central Alberta elected Liberals such as Frank Oliver.

After province-hood, Alberta's federal representation mostly echoed that of its provincial government. Like provincial elections, federal elections again and again saw the leading party (no matter what its label) receive more than its due share of members and the other parties were under-represented.

When Liberals were in power in the Legislative Assembly, most of the province's MPs were Liberal. The 1917 election was an exception – The Union government's use of the soldier vote meant that Liberal candidates with majority support among voters voting in the riding were not declared elected.

Then when the United Farmers dominated from 1921 to 1935, most of the Alberta MPs were of that party. Calgary was a labour stronghold, and its election of two Labour MPs in 1921 was un-equalled anywhere else in the country.

When Social Credit came into vogue, winning its first electoral successes in 1935, federal representation also changed to being mostly Socred. The Social Credit party under Ernest Manning turned right-wing in the 1940s, but this apparently mirrored changing sentiment among Alberta voters. And the party maintained its power provincially and its hold on most of the federal seats until the 1970s.

Alberta's conservative leaning was pronounced on the federal level. The province was the heartland of the Reform Party of Canada and its successor, the Canadian Alliance. These parties were the second-largest political parties in the federal Parliament from 1997 to 2003 and they were located on the political right.

The Canadian Alliance merged with the Progressive Conservative Party to form today's Conservative Party of Canada. The Conservatives' former leader and ex–Prime Minister Stephen Harper, moved to Alberta in the 1980s and represented a Calgary riding; Rona Ambrose, the party's interim leader and Leader of the Opposition (2015–17), is also an Albertan.

Alberta elected no Liberal MP 1958–1963, 1965–1968, 1972–1993, 2006–2015, 2019 to 2021. In 2021 it elected one in Edmonton and one in Calgary. In 2021 it received 15.5 percent of the Alberta votes so was proportionally due five seats in that province. In those years when Alberta had no Liberal MPs, Liberals were in power 1965–1968, 1972–1979, 1980–1984, 1993 to 2006 and 2019 to the present. In almost all of those five periods, for a total of 31 years, Alberta did not have direct representation in the federal cabinet. This included the years when PM Pierre Trudeau tried to create a National Energy Program. It failed. To this day, Canada is one of only a few major countries without a national energy plan.

The CCF never did elect an MP in Alberta. But under its later label, the New Democratic Party, the left has achieved more successes in Alberta, electing an MP in 1988 and one in Edmonton-Strathcona every time since 2008. In 2021 an additional NDP MP was elected in Edmonton Griesbach. The party received almost a fifth of the Alberta vote in 2021 and proportionally was due six seats.

Rural Alberta ridings typically give the leading party, whether it is the Conservatives, or the United Farmers, Social Credit, Reform and the Alliance before them, some of the highest margins in the country; in many cases, the successful candidate receives more than two-thirds of the vote.

=== Provincial political culture ===
Alberta's political stability has led to political continuity. Voters have turned a government out of office only five times in 115 years. The two governments prior to 2015 were among the longest-lived in the Commonwealth.

Since the end of STV/IRV in 1956, Alberta elections have used the first-past-the-post voting system so MLAs elected do not necessarily receive a majority of the votes in the constituency, and the party with a majority of the seats in the Legislature does not necessarily receive a majority of votes cast in the election. For example, in the 2004 election, the Progressive Conservative party won 61 of 83 seats (73% of the seats) but obtained only 47% of the popular vote.

During the UFA and early Socred government periods, elections were conducted using transferable preferential ballots (see ranked voting). Members in cities ran in city-wide districts, under the single transferable voting system ensuring city-wide proportional representation in the Legislature; members outside the cities were elected using Instant-runoff voting. In the cities, under STV, balanced representation was elected, while IRV, used elsewhere, produced the same disproportional results that were produced before 1924 and after 1956 by first past the post. No Labour, CCF or NDP members were elected in Edmonton prior to 1982 except in elections where STV was used. Many of the opposition parties today include electoral reform in their policies.

In its history, Alberta has seen only six distinct governments, with no party ever returning to form government under the same label again after defeat. (The UFA government of 1921-1935 can be seen as a precursor of the NDP government of 2015–2019 as it organizationally was its forerunner. The present UCP government is an organizational descendant of the old Progressive-Conservative Party that reigned from 1971 to 2015.)

1905–1921	Alberta Liberal Party
1921–1935	United Farmers of Alberta
1935–1971	Social Credit Party of Alberta
1971–2015	Progressive Conservative Association of Alberta
2015–2019	Alberta New Democratic Party
2019–present	United Conservative Party

All Alberta elections have resulted in a majority government, a trend unseen in any other Canadian province. (But frequently the most popular party was the choice of less than half the voters.) Even with crossing the floor or by-elections, Alberta has never had a minority government. Each government has held a majority of seats in the Legislature.

=== Liberal to UFA to Social Credit (1905-1971) ===
Elections to the Legislative Assembly of Alberta (1905–1967) - seats won by party
Government	Liberal				UFA			Social Credit								
Party	1905	1909	1913	1917	1921	1926	1930	1935	1940	1944	1948	1952	1955	1959	1963	1967
Liberal	22	36	39	34	15	7	11	5	1		2	3	15	1	2	3
United Farmers of Alberta					38	43	39									
Social Credit								56	36	51	51	53	37	61	60	55
Conservative	3	2	17	19		4	6	2				1	3			
Progressive Conservative												1		1		6
Socialist Party of Canada		1														
Labor Representation League				1												
Dominion Labor Party					4	5	4		1							
Co-operative Commonwealth Federation										2	2	1	2			
Veterans' and Active Force										1						
Coalition													1	1	1	
Independent Labour						1										
Independent Liberal		1														
Independent Social Credit					3						1	1	1	1		
Independent		1		2	1		3						1			1
Independent Movement (anti-SC)									19	3	1		1			1
Liberal Conservative													1			
Soldiers' vote (Province at large)				2												
Soldiers' vote (3 FPTP contests)										3						
Total	25	41	56	58	61	60	63	63	57	60	57	60	61	65	63	65

(Note: The Alberta NDP contested elections starting in 1963 but won no seats in a general election until 1971.)

=== Progressive Conservative to NDP to UCP (1971 to present) ===
Elections to the Legislative Assembly of Alberta (1971–2019) - seats won by party
Government	Progressive Conservative												NDP	UCP	
Party	1971	1975	1979	1982	1986	1989	1993	1997	2001	2004	2008	2012	2015	2019	2023
Progressive Conservative	49	69	74	75	61	59	51	63	74	62	72	61	10		
Social Credit	25	4	4												
Wildrose												17	21		
United Conservative														63	49
New Democratic Party	1	1	1	2	16	16		2	2	4	2	4	54	24	38
Liberal					4	8	32	18	7	16	9	5	1		
Representative Party					2										
Alberta Alliance										1					
Independent Social Credit		1													
Alberta Party													1		
Independent				2											
Total	75	75	79	79	83	83	83	83	83	83	83	87	87	87	87

Some Albertans continue to resent the imposition in the 1980s of the National Energy Program (NEP) by the Liberal federal government of Prime Minister Pierre Trudeau. It was considered to be an intrusion by the federal government in an area of provincial responsibility. This led some Albertans to advocate separation of the province from Canada but this advocacy (despite occasional surges in interest) has never resulted in electoral success. Neither, however, has the Liberal Party of Canada enjoyed much support in Alberta (outside of Edmonton and Calgary) since that time and has not elected any MPs outside of Edmonton and Calgary. The NEP was ended when the Progressive Conservative Party of Canada, led by Brian Mulroney, formed the federal government following the 1984 federal election.

In the 2006 election, the federal Conservative Party of Canada won all the seats in Alberta, providing them with a complete sweep of the province. However, the NDP won the seat of Edmonton—Strathcona in the election of 2008, denying the Conservatives a sweep of the province in this election. No Alberta seats changed parties in the 2011 election, in which the Conservatives went from a minority government to a parliamentary majority. In all three elections, many of the Conservative candidates were elected with large majorities of the vote. Alberta has for decades been considered a conservative fortress, no matter which right-of-centre party they may have chosen to support. Albertans followed strong support for the Progressive Conservatives in the 1980s with the same degree of support for the Reform Party, and the Canadian Alliance in the 1990s, finally delivering a clean sweep for the new Conservative Party of Canada only a few years after its creation in 2003–2004.

However, small disaffection with the Conservative Party of Canada over policies enacted during its minority government such as Equalization payments in Canada and the Conservatives' reversal on income trusts led to the founding of the nascent federal Party of Alberta, in 2006. Provincially, while the Progressive Conservative Party of Alberta had been in power for 40 years, they continued to win large majorities in the Legislative Assembly, winning 72 out of 83 seats in the March 2008 provincial election, although with declining popularity and lowering voter turn-out, reflecting increasing disfavour among ordinary Albertans regarding the government's market-first policies, its low quality of health and education services, and its flat-income tax policy. As well, for the first time since the 1980s, the PCs faced a challenge from the right wing, the upstart Wildrose Alliance Party. A November 2009 poll said the new party had 28% support, just 6 points behind the governing PCs. In polls, the Wildrose Party had a double-digit lead over the PCs in December 2009, with 39% versus 25% each for the PCs and Alberta Liberals.

In April 2015, Jim Prentice called an election for May 5, citing the need for a mandate in order to make longer-term economic changes. Though initial polls had the PCs in the lead, as the election approached they fell behind the opposition Wildrose party, and the NDP. On May 5 the NDP gained 53 seats, winning a majority government under Rachel Notley.

The United Conservative Party (UCP) was established in July 2017 as a merger between the Progressive Conservative Association of Alberta and the Wildrose Party. When established, the UCP immediately formed the Official Opposition in the Legislative Assembly of Alberta. The party won a majority mandate in the 2019 Alberta general election to form the government of Alberta. In the 2023 election it lost several seats but maintained a majority in the Legislative Assembly.

== Finance ==
=== Budget ===
The 2016-2017 budget contained a $10.4 billion deficit, with $41.1 billion in revenue and $51.1 billion in expenditures. The budget also contained a $700 million risk adjustment, which was intended to reflect "volatility of Alberta's resource revenue".

In 2018 government revenue from oil and gas royalties made up 11% of the provincial budget.

Budgets of the Government of Alberta
Year (Note: Fiscal year is April 1 to March 31)	Date	Name	Bill	Minister of Finance		Budget (Billions CAD) (Note: Numbers across different fiscal years are not strictly comparable due to numerous accounting policy changes over time.) (Note: Totals may not add up due to rounding)					Actual (Billions CAD) (Note: Actual expenses taken from reporting in future year budgets or Annual Reports)				Notes
Year	Date	Name	Bill	Minister	Party	Revenue	Expenditure	Other (Provinsion/ Allowance)	Deficit	WTI (USD) (Note: West Texas Intermediate is used a benchmark in North America and serves as a reference price for buyers and sellers of crude oil)	Revenue	Expenditure	Deficit	WTI (USD)	Notes
2020	February 27, 2020	A plan for jobs and the economy		Travis Toews	UCP	50.0	56.1	-0.8	-6.8	58.00	43.1	60.1	-17.0	42.32	
2019	October 24, 2019	A plan for jobs and the economy		Travis Toews	UCP	50.0	56.5	-2.2	-8.7	57.00	46.2	58.4	-12.2	62.77	
2018	March 22, 2018	A recovery built to last		Joe Ceci	NDP	47.9	56.2	-0.5	-8.8	59.00	49.6	56.3	-6.7	53.69	
2017	March 16, 2017	Working to make life better		Joe Ceci	NDP	45.0	54.9	-0.5	-10.3	55.00	47.3	55.3	-8.0	53.69	
2016	April 14, 2016	The Alberta jobs plan		Joe Ceci	NDP	41.4	51.1	-0.7	-10.4	42.00	42.3	53.1	-10.8	47.93	
2015 (Note: The Progressive Conservative government under Premier Jim Prentice introduced a budget for the 2015-16 fiscal year prior to calling the 2015 Alberta general election. The New Democratic Party under Premier Rachel Notley introduced a new budget for the 2015-16 fiscal year upon forming government.)	October 27, 2015	Supporting jobs, supporting families. The Alberta way.		Joe Ceci	NDP	43.8	49.9		-6.1	50.00	42.5	48.9	-6.4	45.00	
2015	March 16, 2015	N/A		Robin Campbell	PC	43.4	48.4		-5.0	54.84	42.5	48.9	-6.4	45.00	
2014	March 6, 2014	The building Alberta plan		Doug Horner	PC	43.1	40.4		2.6	95.22	49.5	48.4	1.1	80.48	
2013	March 7, 2013	Responsible change		Doug Horner	PC	37.6	38.0	1.1	0.7	92.50	45.3	44.5	0.8	99.05	
2012	February 9, 2012	Investing in people		Ron Liepert	PC	40.3	41.1		-0.9	99.25	38.7	41.6	-2.8	92.07	
2011	February 24, 2011	Building a better Alberta		Lloyd Snelgrove	PC	35.6	39.0		-3.4	89.40	39.2	39.3	-0.02	97.33	
2010	February 9, 2010	Striking the right balance		Ted Morton	PC	34.0	38.7		-4.7	78.75	35.0	38.4	-3.4	83.38	

== See also ==
- List of premiers of Alberta
- List of Alberta general elections
- List of political parties in Alberta
- Politics of Canada
- Political culture of Canada
- Council of the Federation
