= Nicholas Devlin =

Albertan judge

The Honourable Nicholas Devlin
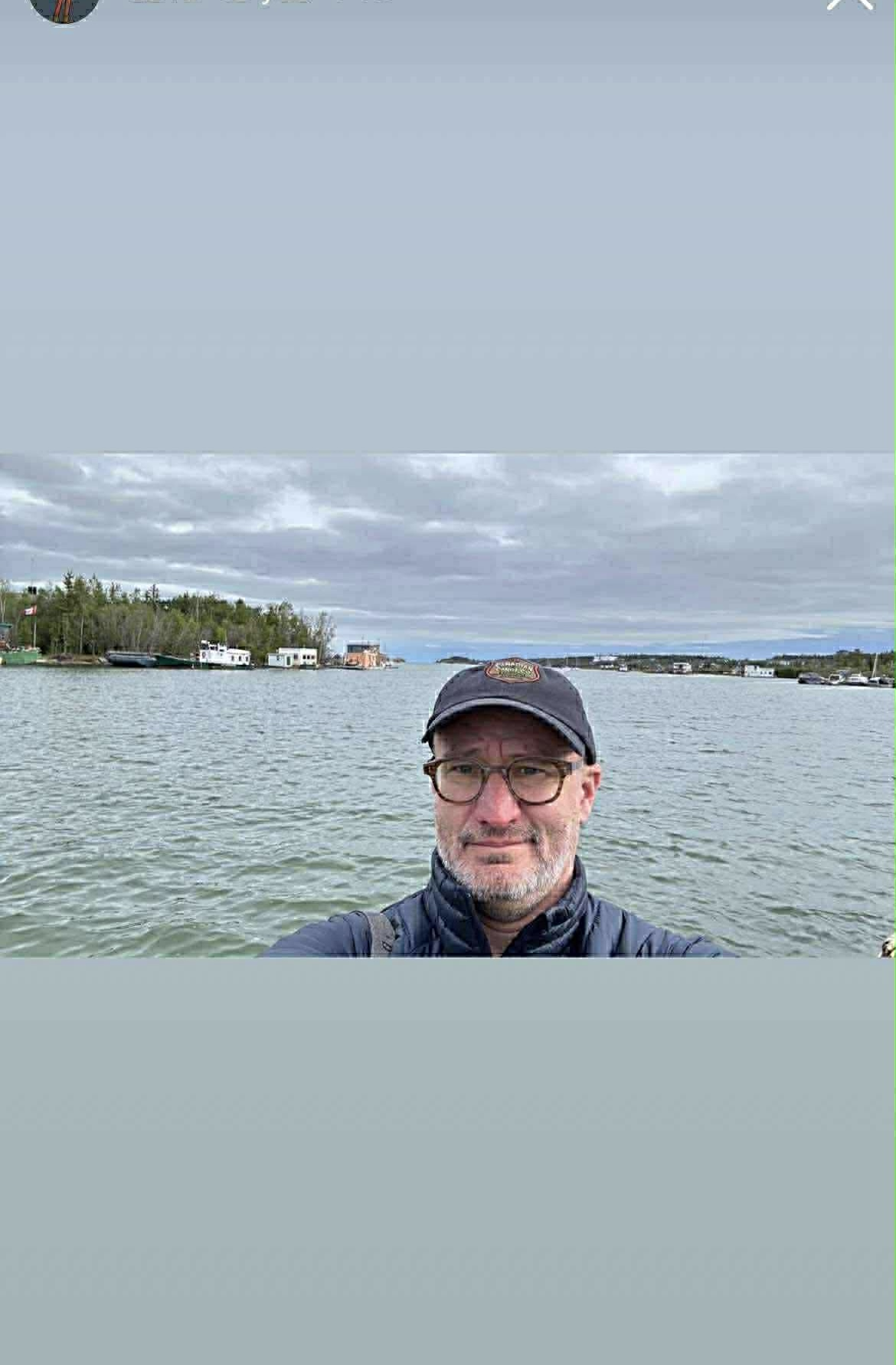

Justice of the Court of King's Bench of Alberta
- Incumbent
- Assumed office May 22, 2019
- Appointed by: Julie Payette
- Preceded by: Jolaine Antonio

Personal details
- Born: September 30, 1971 (age 55) Calgary, Alberta
- Education: University of Calgary (BA, LLB); University of Toronto (LLM)
- Occupation: judge

Nicholas Devlin (born September 30, 1971) is a Canadian jurist and former federal prosecutor. He is currently a Justice of the Court of King's Bench of Alberta.

Devlin served as law clerk for Justice Jack Major of the Supreme Court of Canada and then worked in various roles as a federal prosecutor with Public Prosecution Service of Canada. He was elevated to a federally appointed judge in 2019.

== Early life and education ==
Nicholas Edward Devlin was born on September 30, 1971, in Calgary, Alberta.

He attended the University of Calgary where he earned his Bachelor of Arts in Canadian Studies in 1993 and his Bachelor of Law, graduating as his class's gold medalist in 1996. He went on to complete his Master of Law in 1998 at the University of Toronto where he wrote his thesis on the Charter of Freedom and Rights and freedom of the press.

== Career ==
=== Public Prosecution Service of Canada ===
After university, Devlin clerked for Justice Jack Major of the Supreme Court of Canada and was called to the Ontario bar in 1999. He then worked at the litigation department of Torys for one year before spending time as a Fox Scholar at Middle Temple in London.

From 2001 till his appointment as a judge, Devlin served as a federal prosecutor and later as Senior General Counsel with Public Prosecution Service of Canada, during which he regularly appeared on behalf of the crown in front of the Supreme Court of Canada. There he argued prominent cases like R v. Topp, Mills v. R, R v. Taylor, Marakah v. R and Jones v. R, the last two of which formed significant dual cases regarding privacy law surrounding text messages in Canada. Devlin's role in those two cases was to represent the Crown's position during the appeal, emphasizing the loss of control over messages once they are sent, which impacts the expectation of privacy.

He was part of the landmark case R v. Antic which reaffirmed the “ladder principle” in bail decisions and emphasized the presumption of innocence and the right to reasonable bail under part (e) of Section 11 of the Canadian Charter of Rights and Freedoms, although Devlin's role representing the intervener was to argue for less lenient forms of detention provisions.

Outside the supreme court and in a trial fervently covered by the national media, Devlin was the prosecutor in a case in front of the Ontario Court of Appeal involving the 2011 Canadian federal election voter suppression scandal and the bail application of Michael Sona in front of Justice Harry LaForme.

He was also the prosecutor on prominent appeals like the one front of the Nunavut Court of Appeal involving Catholic priest Eric Dejaeger in a sexual abuse case and the life sentence conviction of Momin Khawaja.

Devlin served as adjunct professor at Osgoode Hall Law School from 2013 to 2017 where he taught trial advocacy techniques and cross examination methods.

=== Judicial career ===
On May 22, 2019, David Lametti, Minister of Justice and Attorney General of Canada, announced Devlin's appointment as a Justice of the Court of King's Bench of Alberta and a Judge ex officio of the Court of Appeal of Alberta.

In 2021, Devlin presided over a landmark case in which a Calgary woman sued the Calgary Police Service for negligence in the handling of her sexual assault complaint.

Further that year, Devlin ruled that no jurors will be allowed to serve in an upcoming sexual assault trial unless they confirm they have been vaccinated for COVID-19, which sparked controversy.

Devlin was the judge that overlooked the defamation suit initiated by Quebec-based DJ SNAILS in March 2024, where he awarded the plaintiff $1.5 million in damages.

As part of his role in the Supreme Court of the Northwest Territories, Devlin ordered the release of $120,000 in frozen funds to the former CEO of Łutsël K'é Dene First Nation’s business arm Denesoline Corporation, Ron Barlas, as funds for legal defence in January 2025.

== Publications ==
  - Devlin, Nicholas E. (1999). "Ink and Liberty: Newspaper Ownership Concentration and Freedom of the Press under the Charter of Rights and Freedoms". Ottawa Law Review. University of Toronto.
  - Devlin, Nicholas E. (1997-01-01). "Opinion Polls and the Protection of Political Speech—A Comment on Thomson Newspapers Co. v. Canada (Attorney General)". Ottawa Law Review. 28 (2).
