= University of Alberta Faculty of Law =

Public law school in Edmonton, Alberta, Canada

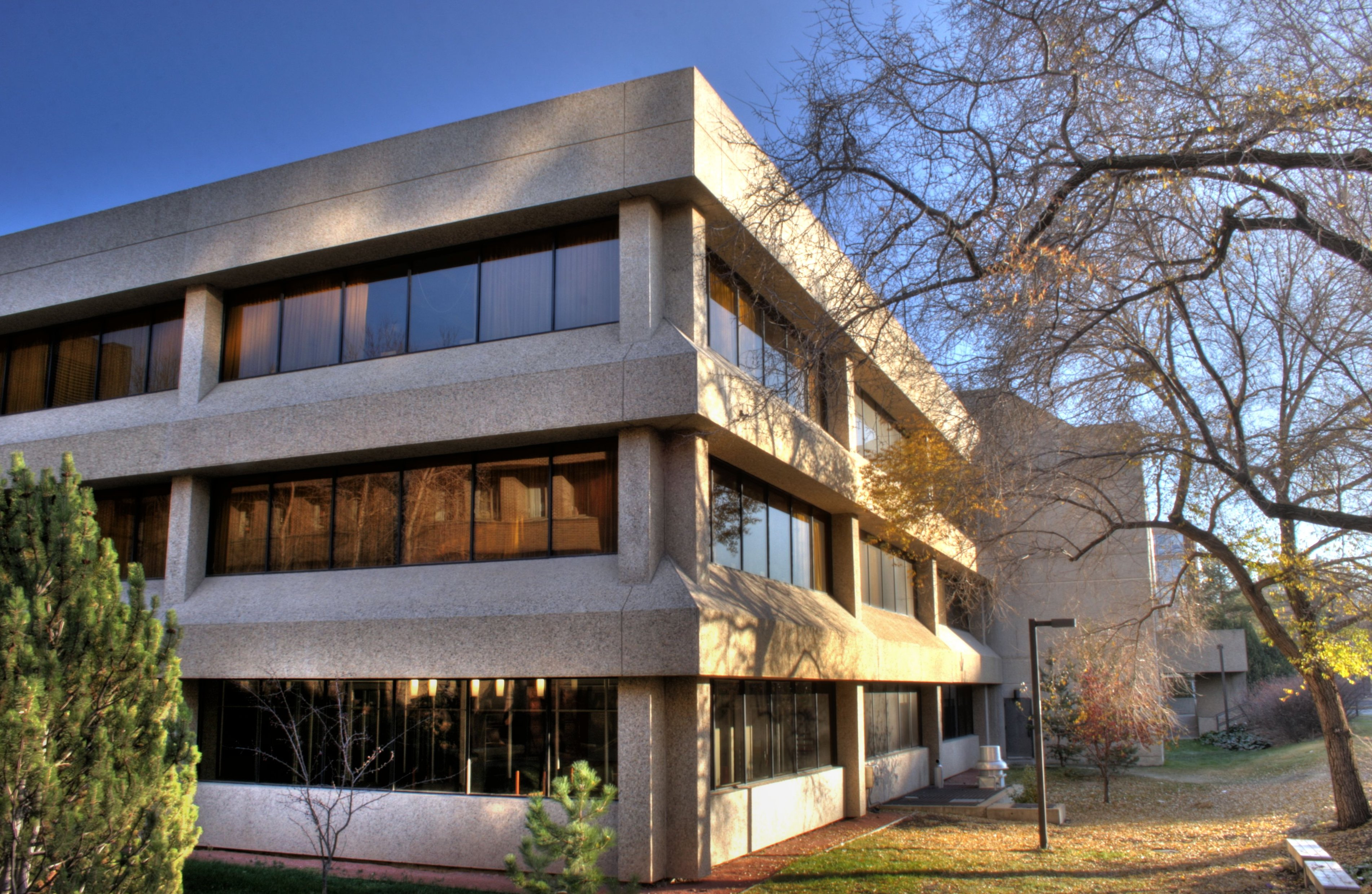
- Established: 1912; 114 years ago
- School type: Public
- Dean: Fiona Kelly
- Location: Edmonton, Alberta, Canada; 53.5243°N 113.5187°W
- Enrolment: 525
- Faculty: 97
- Website: Official website

The University of Alberta Faculty of Law is the graduate school of law of the University of Alberta in Edmonton, Alberta, Canada. Established as an undergraduate faculty in 1912 it is the third oldest law school in Canada, and often considered the oldest law school in Western Canada.

The school offers a three-year Juris Doctor (J.D.) program, as well as the graduate degrees of Master of Laws (LL.M.) and Ph.D.

An Anglophone, common law institution, the Faculty is known for its Centre for Constitutional Studies, Health Law Institute, rigorous curriculum and collegial atmosphere.

The Faculty of Law is widely respected for the breadth and depth of instruction it provides in the fundamentals of Canadian law. 92-95% of students at the Faculty of Law find an articling position or pursue graduate studies and the school is ranked second nationally for 'elite firm hiring'.

The former Chief Justice of Canada, Beverley McLachlin; and the former Chief Justice of Alberta, Catherine Fraser, are both graduates of the University of Alberta Faculty of Law.

== Academics ==
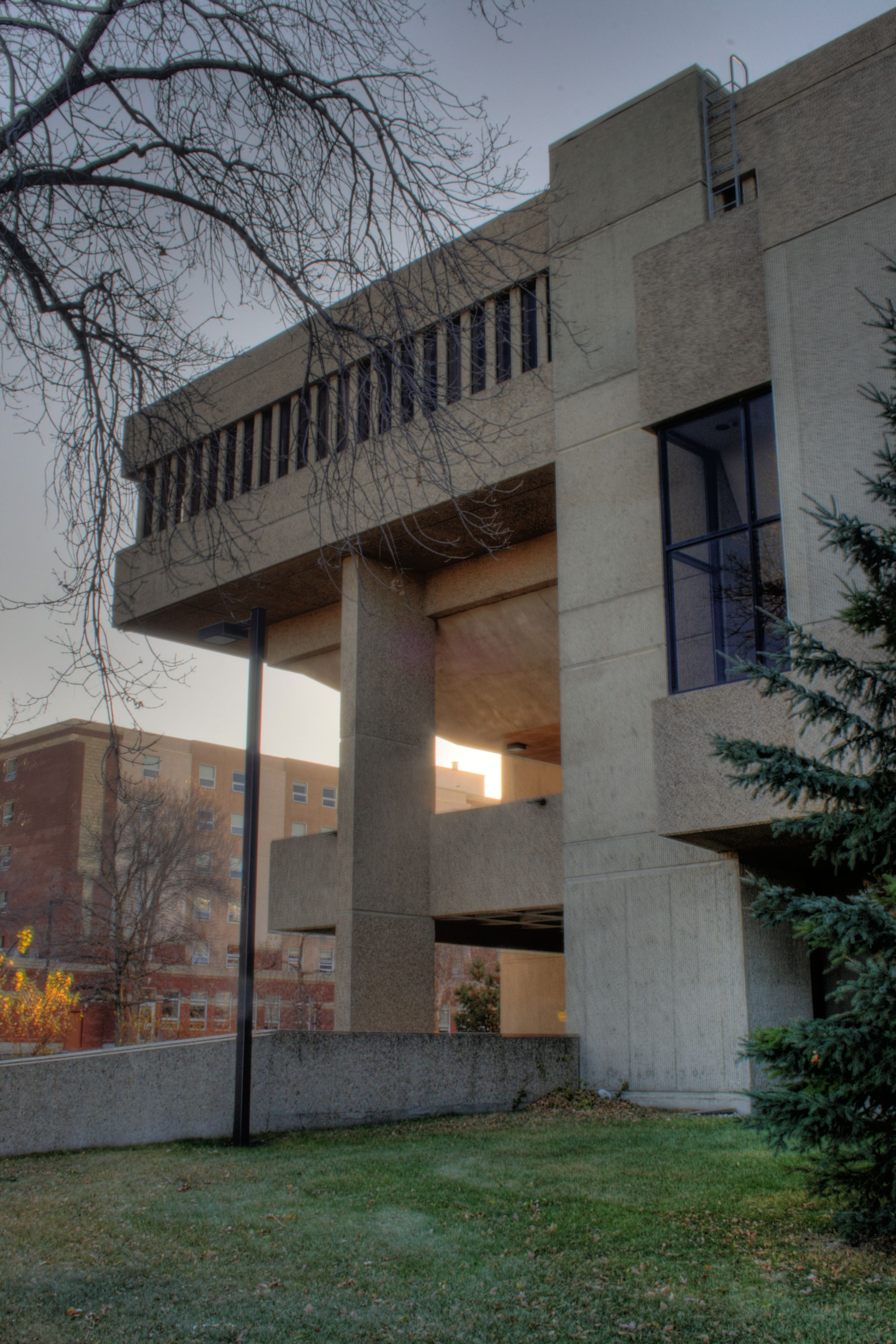
University of Alberta Law Centre

=== Admissions Statistics ===
University rankings

World rankings

Canadian rankings

The entrance average is traditionally around 3.9/165 (GPA/LSAT). The male-female ratio is approximately 49:51. The average age of admitted students is 21 years of age. In 2017, 17% of applicants successfully gained admissions to the University of Alberta Faculty of Law (185/1060). For purposes of grouping, the law school looks primarily at your last two years of study or the equivalent thereof.

=== Joint Programs ===
JD/MBA: A 4-year joint-JD/MBA program is offered in cooperation with the University of Alberta School of Business.

DUAL JD: The University of Alberta Faculty of Law and the University of Colorado at Boulder Law School (Colorado, USA) offer a dual degree program that enables students to obtain an Alberta law degree and a Colorado law degree within four years. University of Alberta students take the first two years of their legal studies at the University of Alberta and the latter two at Boulder.

=== JD ===
Most students at the faculty are Juris Doctor candidates. This is a three-year program. Previously, the University of Alberta Faculty of Law has granted the Bachelor of Laws to graduating students, following the British naming tradition despite structurally being similar to the American graduate education structure. This ended in 2011.

=== Tuition ===
Tuition fees for entering Juris Doctor (JD) are set at C$15,995 for domestic students and C$29,727.80 for international students in 2017–2018.

=== Employment ===
The Faculty of Law is ranked #2 in Canada for "Elite Firm Hiring" by Maclean's (2014).

== Facilities ==
=== Library ===
The John A. Weir Memorial Law Library, with approximately 390,000 volumes, is the second largest law library in Canada (after the Osgoode Hall Law School library).

=== Institutes and Centres of Excellence ===
- Alberta Law Reform Institute
  - The Alberta Law Reform Institute is the official law reform agency for the province of Alberta.
- Centre for Constitutional Studies
  - The Centre for Constitutional Studies is an academic centre of excellence dedicated to study of constitutional issues.
- Health Law Institute
  - Canada's preeminent Health Law research institute, home to leading health law scholars Gerald Robertson, Timothy Caulfield, Erin Nelson and Peter Carver, among others.
- International Ombudsman Institute
- Student Legal Services of Edmonton

=== Alberta Law Review ===
- Founded in 1955, the Alberta Law Review is the most widely read university-based law review in Canada, with over 2,500 subscribers.

== Extracurricular ==
There are 28 clubs, groups and other student led organizations at the Faculty of Law, including Alberta Law Review, Canons of Construction (student newspaper), Environmental Law Association, Law & Business Association, the Law Students Association, OutLaw, and Women's Law Forum and others.

=== Student Legal Services ===
Each year approximately 250 law students from the Faculty of Law volunteer with Student Legal Services, a student-managed, non-profit society dedicated to helping low income individuals with legal issues in the Edmonton area. Student Legal Services was founded in 1969 and is one of the largest legal clinics in Canada.

=== Law Show ===
Since 1995, law students have presented a large scale variety show with all proceeds going to charity called Law Show. The show features an entertaining law-themed play written by students interspersed with dancing, singing, and videos. Prior to 2008, the show was formatted as a variety hour-style show, but since it has taken the form of a play which spoofs a famous movie or television show. The show is usually held on the final weekend of January.

- Law Show 2008: It's a Wonderful Law
- Law Show 2009: The League of Extraordinary Lawyers
- Law Show 2010: Where in the Law is Carmen Sandiego?
- Law Show 2011: Draculaw
- Law Show 2012: The Wizard of Laws
- Law Show 2013: Charlie and the Law Factory
- Law Show 2014: Alawddin
- Law Show 2015: Harry Lawter
- Law Show 2016: Ferris Buellaw's Day Off
- Law Show 2017: Alice in Wonderlaw
- Law Show 2018: Monsters LLP
- Law Show 2019: Neverlaw: The Peter Pan Story
- Law Show 2020: Shrek: Law & Ogre
- Law Show 2021: Scooby-Doo: Long Paw of the Law
- Law Show 2023: Mean Lawyers
- Law Show 2024: Lawma Mia!
- Law Show 2025: Twilaw: Breaking Precedent

== Alumni ==
- Beverley McLachlin, former Chief Justice of Canada
- W.A. Stevenson, former Puisne Justice of the Supreme Court of Canada
- Ronald Martland, former Puisne Justice of the Supreme Court of Canada
- Mary Moreau, Puisne Justice of the Supreme Court of Canada
- Catherine Fraser, former Chief Justice of Alberta
- William A. McGillivray, former Chief Justice of Alberta
- Allan Wachowich, former Chief Justice of the Court of Queen's Bench of Alberta
- Edward R. Wachowich - Chief Judge of the Provincial Court of Alberta
- Ron Stevens, former Deputy Premier of Alberta and Minister of International and Intergovernmental Relations; Justice of the Court of Queen's Bench of Alberta
- L. S. Tony Mandamin, first Aboriginal Canadian Judge appointed to the Federal Court of Canada
- Peter Lougheed, former Premier of Alberta
- David Hancock, former Premier of Alberta, Alberta Minister of Human Services and Government House Leader
- Ron Ghitter, former Senator and Alberta MLA
- Clarence Campbell, former President of the National Hockey League
- Chief Wilton Littlechild, first Treaty Indian in Canada to serve as a Member of Parliament; elected Regional Chief of Alberta
- Daryl Katz, CEO & Chairman of The Katz Group and owner of the Edmonton Oilers
- David McLean, CEO of The McLean Group; chairman, Canadian National Railway Company
- Ron Cummings, retired litigator known for liability cases
- Violet King Henry, the first black female lawyer in Canada.
- Patrick Peacock, President of the Canadian Bar Association, 1988–89; President of the Calgary Stampeders, 1985–86 and Vice Chairman of the Board of Governors of the Canadian Football League, 1985.
- Steve Blackman, Emmy-nominated writer and founder of Law Show.

Over a dozen graduates of the Faculty of Law have become Rhodes Scholars, and two have won the Vinerian Scholarship at Oxford.

Frank MacInnis, who graduated with an LL.B. in 1971, donated $2.5 million to the law school in 2006.

== See also ==
- List of law schools in Canada
