= David Lynch Scott =

Canadian judge

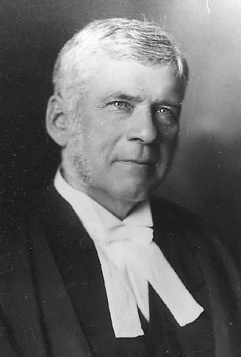

Chief Justice of Alberta
- In office 1921–1924
- Preceded by: Horace Harvey
- Succeeded by: George Bligh O'Connor

Mayor of Orangeville
- In office 1879–1880

Mayor of Regina
- In office 1884–1885
- Preceded by: Position established
- Succeeded by: Daniel Mowat

Personal details
- Born: August 21, 1845 Brampton, Ontario
- Died: July 26, 1924 (aged 78) Cooking Lake, Alberta
- Occupation: Lawyer, politician, soldier
- Awards: Canada General Service Medal

Military service
- Allegiance: Canadian Militia
- Years of service: 1866 - 1879
- Rank: Private; Sergeant; Lieutenant Colonel
- Unit: Brampton Infantry Company; 36th Peel Regiment
- Battles/wars: Fenian Raids

David Lynch Scott (21 August 1845 – 26 July 1924) was a Canadian militia officer, lawyer, and judge. He served as mayor of Orangeville, Ontario, mayor of Regina, Saskatchewan and Chief Justice of Alberta.

== Early life ==
He was born in Brampton, Ontario, the son of John Scott and Mary Lynch. He studied law at Osgoode Hall, was called to the Ontario bar in 1870 and practised in Brampton and Orangeville. In 1882, he moved to Regina, Saskatchewan.

== Marriage ==
He married Mary McVittie on November 19, 1883 in Barrie, Ontario.

== Career ==
He enlisted as a private in the 36th (Peel) Battalion of Infantry during the Fenian invasions of 1866. By the end of his military service in 1879, he had attained the rank of lieutenant-colonel.

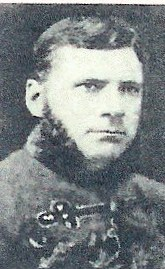
Lieutenant David Scott, 36th Peel Battalion, c.1870

Scott was mayor of Orangeville from 1879–1880, and in 1884-85 served as the first Mayor of Regina. Scott first rose to prominence as a lawyer when he acted as the junior counsel for the crown in the prosecutions of Louis Riel, Big Bear, Poundmaker and those involved in the Frog Lake Massacre following the North-West Rebellion of 1885.

He was named Queen's Counsel in 1885 and was the first person admitted as an advocate of the Northwest Territories. Scott became a justice of the newly formed Supreme Court of the Northwest Territories in 1894, seated in Calgary, Alberta. In 1907 he became a member of the Supreme Court of the new province of Alberta, seated in Edmonton.

When Chief Justice of Alberta Arthur Sifton resigned to become Premier, Scott thought he would be his replacement. However, Horace Harvey received the appointment. This frustrated Scott to the extent that he went from being an extremely active member of the bench, to a virtually non-existent member for the next decade. However, on 15 September 1921, he became the Chief Justice of Alberta and presided over the Supreme Court of Alberta Appellate Division. This reignited the feud with Harvey who had occupied the position of Chief Justice of Alberta since 1910. The feud was resolved in Scott's favour by the Judicial Committee of the Privy Council in Reference re Chief Justice of Alberta.

== Later life ==
Scott was awarded an honorary Doctor of Laws from the University of Alberta in 1924.

== Death ==
He died in Cooking Lake, Alberta, where he had a summer cottage, at the age of 78 in 1924. He was interred in Edmonton.
