= Alberta Rules of Court =

The Alberta Rules of Court are a regulation enacted pursuant to the Alberta Judicature Act, and form the civil practice and procedural rules governing court proceedings in the Canadian province of Alberta, specifically in the Court of King's Bench of Alberta and Alberta Court of Appeal.

The current Rules are identified as Alta. Reg. 124/2010, and came into force in November, 2010.

The Alberta Law Reform Institute (ALRI), the province's law commission, was given a mandate in 2001 to review the Rules of Court and produce recommendations for a new set of Rules. The project goal was to create rules that are clear, useful and effective tools for accessing a fair, timely and cost efficient civil justice system. Alta. Reg. 256/2010.
