= Summary offence =

Crime tried without a jury

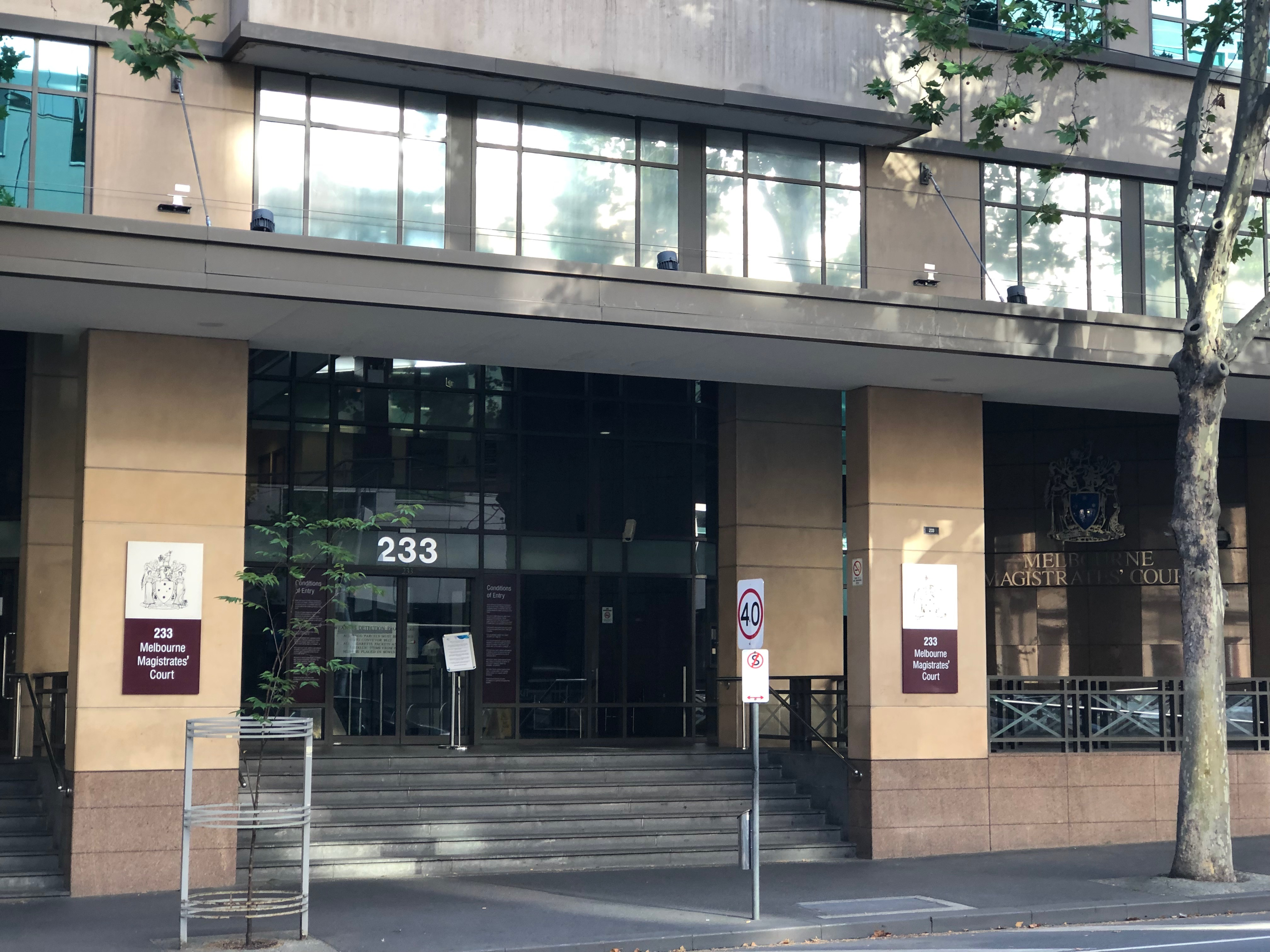
The Melbourne Magistrates' Court. In Victoria, Australia, all summary offences are heard in the Magistrates' Court

A summary offence or petty offence is a violation in some common law jurisdictions that can be proceeded against summarily, without the right to a jury trial or indictment (required for an indictable offence).

== Canada ==
In Canada, summary offences are referred to as summary conviction offences. As in other jurisdictions, summary conviction offences are considered less serious than indictable offences because they are punishable by shorter prison sentences and smaller fines. Section 787 of the Criminal Code specifies that unless another punishment is provided for by law, the maximum penalty for a summary conviction offence is a sentence of 2 years less a day of imprisonment, a fine of $5,000, or both.

As a matter of practical effect, some common differences between summary conviction and indictable offences are provided below.

=== Summary conviction offences ===
- Accused must be charged with a summary conviction within one year after the act happened. Limitation periods are set out in the Criminal Code.
- The police can arrest under summary conviction without an arrest warrant if found committing a summary offence notwithstanding s. 495(2)(c) of the Criminal Code.
- If the police do not find committing a summary offence, an arrest warrant is required.
- Accused does not have to submit fingerprints when charged under Summary Conviction.
- Appeals of summary conviction offences go first to the highest trial court within the jurisdiction (e.g., provincial superior court in Alberta is the Court of King's Bench).
- After Provincial Superior Court a further appeal would go to the Provincial Court of Appeal (e.g., the Court of Appeal of Alberta), and then finally to the Supreme Court of Canada, but as a practical matter very few summary convictions are ever heard by the Supreme Court of Canada.
- Accused convicted under summary conviction are eligible for a pardon after five years provided the accused is not convicted of any further offences during that period.
- Always tried in a provincial court (cannot be joined with an indictable offence in a superior court).

=== Indictable offences ===
- There is no time limit to when charges can be laid, such that an accused can be charged at any time after an act has occurred. The exception to this point is treason, which has a 3-year limitation period.
- Police do not require a warrant to arrest under an indictable offence: see S.495(1)(a) Criminal Code
- Accused has to submit fingerprints when required to appear to answer to an indictable offence.
- Appeals always go to the Provincial Court of Appeal first, and then on to the Supreme Court of Canada.
- Accused convicted under an indictable offence can apply for a record suspension after 10 years, except in certain cases.

== Hong Kong ==
In Hong Kong, trials for summary offences are heard in one of the territory's Magistrates' Courts, unless the defendant is accused with other indictable offence(s). Typical examples for summary offences in Hong Kong include possession of a simulated bomb, drunkenness, taking photographs in courts, careless driving and pretending to be a public officer.

== New Zealand ==
Under New Zealand law, summary offences are covered by the Summary Offences Act 1981, and include offences that resemble forgery, fraud, nuisance, as well as offences against public order. It also covers some aspects of search, arrest and jurisdiction, as well as regulating the sale of spray paint.

== United Kingdom ==
In relation to England and Wales, the expression "summary trial" means a trial in the magistrates' court. In such proceedings there is no jury; the appointed judge, or a panel of three lay magistrates, decides the guilt or innocence of the accused. Each summary offence is specified by statute which describes the (usually minor) offence and the judge to hear it. A summary procedure can result in a summary conviction. A "summary offence" is one which, if charged to an adult, can only be tried by summary procedure. Similar procedures are also used in Scotland.

Certain offences that may be tried in a Crown Court (by jury) may be required to be tried summarily if the value involved is small; such offences are still considered either way offences, so are not thereby "summary offences" in the meaning of that term defined by statute. Contrariwise, certain summary offences may in certain circumstances be tried on indictment along with other offences that are themselves indictable; they do not thereby become "indictable offences" or "either way offences" but remain "summary offences", though tried by jury.

Sir William Blackstone, in his Commentaries on the Laws of England (1765–1769), described summary offences thus:

By a summary proceeding I mean principally such as is directed by several acts of parliament (for the common law is a stranger to it, unless in the case of contempts) for the conviction of offenders, and the inflicting of certain penalties created by those acts of parliament. In these there is no intervention of a jury, but the party accused is acquitted or condemned by the suffrage of such person only, as the statute has appointed for his judge. An institution designed professedly for the greater ease of the subject, by doing him speedy justice, and by not harassing the freeholders with frequent and troublesome attendances to try every minute offence. But it has of late been so far extended, as, if a check be not timely given, to threaten the disuse of our admirable and truly English trial by jury, unless only in capital cases.

In the United Kingdom, trials for summary offences are heard in one of a number of types of lower court. For England and Wales this is the Magistrates' Court. In Scotland, it is the Sheriff Court or Justice of the peace court, depending on the offence (the latter being primarily for the most minor of offences). Northern Ireland has its own Magistrates' Court system.

== United States ==
In United States federal and state law, "there are certain minor or petty offenses that may be proceeded against summarily, and without a jury". These can include criminal and civil citations, where a person may be charged with a criminal or non-criminal infraction without the need of a physical arrest, such as in cases of non-violent fineable violations, crimes that carry little incarceration time, or non-criminal acts such as speeding. Any crime that is punishable by the controlling law for more than six months of imprisonment must have some means for a jury trial. Some states, such as California, provide that all defendants are entitled to a jury trial (irrespective of the nature of their offenses). In any case, for summary criminal offenses in the United States, convictions can still show as such on a criminal record.

Contempt of court is considered a prerogative of the court, as "the requirement of a jury does not apply to contempts committed in disobedience of any lawful writ, process, order, rule, decree, or command entered in any suit or action brought or prosecuted in the name of, or on behalf of, the United States". There have been criticisms over the practice. In particular, Supreme Court Justice Hugo Black wrote in a 1964 dissent: "It is high time, in my judgment, to wipe out root and branch the judge-invented and judge-maintained notion that judges can try criminal contempt cases without a jury."

== See also ==
- Misdemeanor
- Indictable offence
- Summary execution
- Hybrid offence
