= William Stevenson (judge) =

Former Justice of the Supreme Court of Canada (1934–2021)

William Stevenson OC

Puisne Justice of the Supreme Court of Canada
- In office September 17, 1990 – June 4, 1992
- Nominated by: Brian Mulroney
- Preceded by: Antonio Lamer
- Succeeded by: John C. Major

Justice of the Court of Appeal of Alberta
- In office October 23, 1980 – September 17, 1990
- Nominated by: Pierre Trudeau

Justice of the Court of Queen's Bench of Alberta
- In office June 30, 1979 – October 23, 1980
- Nominated by: Pierre Trudeau

Judge of the District Court of Alberta
- In office July 31, 1975 – June 30, 1979
- Nominated by: Pierre Trudeau

Personal details
- Born: May 7, 1934 Edmonton, Alberta
- Died: July 7, 2021 (aged 87) Edmonton, Alberta
- Education: University of Alberta (BA, LLB)
- Profession: lawyer, judge

William Alexander Stevenson OC (May 7, 1934 – July 7, 2021) was a Puisne Justice of the Supreme Court of Canada from 1990 to 1992.

== Early life ==
Stevenson was born on May 7, 1934, in Edmonton, Alberta, the only child of Alexander Lindsay Stevenson, an Edmonton Police Service officer, and Eileen Harriet Burns. He attended Eastwood School before enrolling at the University of Alberta in 1952, graduating in 1957 with a Bachelor of Arts and a Bachelor of Laws. He was awarded the Horace Harvey Gold Medal in Law as the top student in 1957. While at the University of Alberta, he helped found the Alberta Law Review and served as its first Editor in Chief.

== Legal career ==
After graduating from the University of Alberta, Stevenson articled with Morrow, Morrow & Reynolds (later Morrow, Reynolds and Stevenson, and now Reynolds, Mirth, Richards & Farmer LLP) in Edmonton. He became a partner upon being called to the bar in 1958 alongside his mentor William George Morrow, and his work focused primarily on litigation, especially personal injury cases for plaintiffs.

In October 1959, Stevenson, along with William George Morrow, Val Milvain, Herb Laycraft, and Ross MacKimmie represented the defendant in Ponoka-Calmar Oils v Wakefield, the last Canadian ruling rendered by the Judicial Committee of the Privy Council. (Note: Ponoka-Calmar Oils Ltd. et al. v Earl F. Wakefield Co. et al., 1959 CanLII 427, [1960] AC 18, UK JCPC)

In 1963, Stevenson began teaching as a sessional instructor at the University of Alberta Faculty of Law. He served as a full-time professor from 1968 to 1970, after which he returned to private practice with his firm, but continued to teach part time until 1985.

In the late 1960s, Stevenson joined Horace Johnson, and James Herbert Laycraft on the committee to revise the Alberta Rules of Court.

In 1975, he founded and became the first Chairman of the Legal Education Society of Alberta.

== Judicial career ==
On July 31, 1975, Stevenson was appointed by Prime Minister Pierre Trudeau to the District Court of Alberta. Following the merger of Alberta’s courts in 1979, he became a judge of the Court of Queen's Bench of Alberta on June 30, 1979. (Note: District Courts were superior courts under section 96 of the Constitution Act, 1867, with lesser jurisdiction than the superior court.) He was elevated to the Court of Appeal of Alberta on October 23, 1980.

In addition to his Alberta appointments, Stevenson also served on several territorial courts. He sat on the Supreme Court of the Northwest Territories from 1976 to 1980, on the Court of Appeal for the Northwest Territories from 1980 to 1990, and on the Supreme Court of the Yukon Territory from 1978 to 1983.

In 1986, at the request of Chief Justice Brian Dickson and the Minister of Justice, Stevenson conducted a national study on judicial education. His report identified uneven coverage, significant gaps and deficiencies, duplication, and a lack of coordination that resulted in wasted resources. He recommended the creation of a permanent, professionally operated, bilingual resource centre for judicial education in Canada. Stevenson subsequently became the founder of the National Judicial Institute (originally the Canadian Judicial Centre) in the late 1980s, and he is regarded as a pioneer of continuing education for Canadian judges.

== Justice of the Supreme Court of Canada ==
On September 17, 1990, he was appointed to the Supreme Court of Canada; however, he retired only two years later on June 5, 1992, for health reasons due to a progressive multidegenerative neurological condition. Between October 1990 and April 1992 he published a total of 21 reasons for judgment.

== Personal life ==
In July 1961, he married Patricia, and together had four children.

Stevenson died in Edmonton on July 7, 2021, at the age of 87, a month after being diagnosed with stage 4 cancer.

== Legacy ==
Justice Russell Brown described Stevenson's judgments as "models of uncommonly fine legal writing, characterized by economical, pithy and scrupulous legal analysis." His decisions have also been praised as "models of logic and clarity," reflecting his belief in an incremental approach to the development of the common law.

During his time on the District Court and the Alberta Court of Appeal, Stevenson was regarded as more conservative than his colleagues James Herbert Laycraft and Roger Kerans. His judgments were noted for their intellectual rigour, and he was known for writing only as much as was necessary to resolve the appeal before him.

=== Publications ===
Stevenson, together with Justice Jean E.L. Côté, co-authored Annotations of The Alberta Rules of Court, which later formed the basis for the Civil Procedure Encyclopedia, a five-volume treatise often used by both barristers and the courts.

=== Awards ===
In 1992, Stevenson received an honorary Doctor of Laws degree from the University of Alberta. In 1996, he was appointed an Officer of the Order of Canada.
