= Anne Russell (judge) =

Anne Helen Russell CM KC (born May 22, 1940) is a former judge on the Alberta Court of Appeal.

== Life ==
Russell was born Anne Helen Lucas in Winnipeg and studied law at the University of Alberta. She was appointed to the Provincial Court of Alberta in 1984, to the Court of Queen's Bench in 1992, and to the Court of Appeal in 1994. She served until her retirement in 2006. She is one of the few Alberta judges who have served on all three courts in the province.

One of the most famous judgements she delivered was on the case of Vriend versus Alberta that she presided over on the Court of Queen's Bench. The case involved a dismissal of a teacher because of his sexual orientation. She found in favour of Vriend – a decision that was overturned by the Court of Appeal, but which then proceeded to the Supreme Court of Canada, where Russell's original ruling was upheld.

She currently lives in Victoria, British Columbia.
