= Horace Harvey =

Chief Justice of Alberta, Canada (1863–1949)

The Honourable Horace Harvey KC
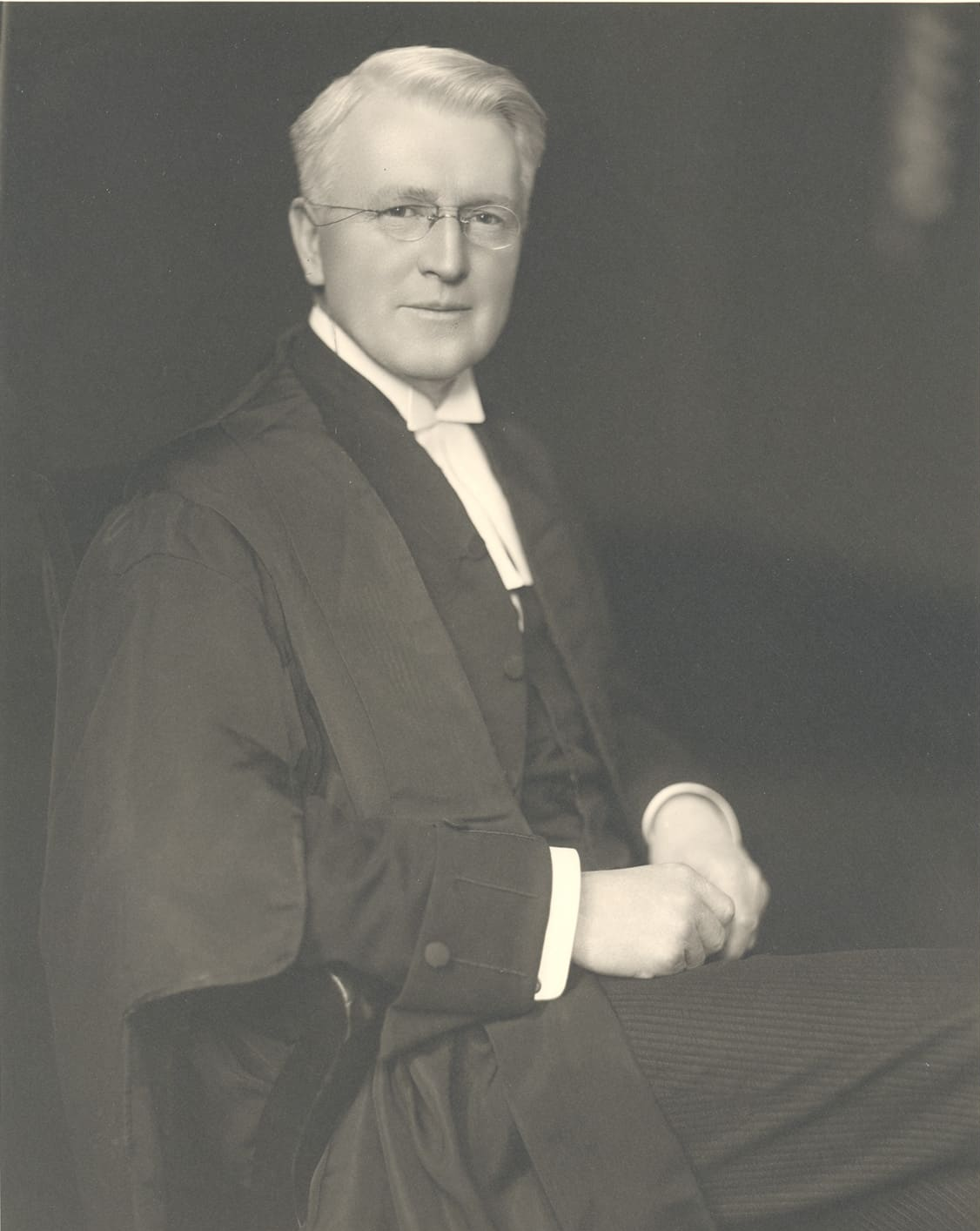
- Harvey in 1920

Chief Justice of Alberta, Canada
- In office 1924–1949
- Preceded by: David Lynch Scott
- Succeeded by: George Bligh O'Connor
- In office 1910–1921
- Preceded by: Arthur Sifton
- Succeeded by: David Lynch Scott

Personal details
- Born: October 1, 1863 Elgin County, Canada West
- Died: September 9, 1949 (aged 85) Edmonton, Alberta, Canada
- Spouse: Nora Lousie Palmerin (m. 1893)
- Children: Alan Burnside Harvey
- Parent: William Harvey (father)
- Education: University of Toronto
- Occupation: lawyer, judge

Horace Harvey KC (October 1, 1863 – September 9, 1949) was a lawyer, jurist, and a Chief Justice of Alberta, Canada.

== Early and family life ==
Harvey was born in Elgin County, Canada West, on October 1, 1863, to William Harvey, Liberal Member of Parliament for Elgin East 1872–1874, and Sophronia (née) Mack.

A Quaker, he married Nora Lousie Palmerin in Ontario in 1893. Together they had one son, Alan Burnside Harvey, on April 22, 1899. Alan became a Rhodes Scholar, a lawyer, Queen's Counsel, Registrar of the Supreme Court of Canada, and editor of Tremeear's Annotated Criminal Code, Canada.

== Career ==
=== Early career ===
He received his Bachelor of Arts degree in 1886 and a Bachelor of Laws degree from the University of Toronto in 1888. He was admitted to the Ontario Bar the following year and to the Northwest Territories Bar, the predecessor to the Law Society of Alberta, in 1893.

Harvey began his career in Calgary, at the firm of Harvey and McCarthy. In 1896 he was Registrar of Land Titles for Southern Alberta before his appointment as the Deputy Attorney General of the Northwest Territories in 1900, requiring him to move to Regina, Assiniboia. His first judicial appointment came on June 27, 1904, when he was appointed a judge of the Supreme Court of the Northwest Territories and stationed in Macleod, where a new courthouse had been built that year. With the creation of the province of Alberta in 1905, he moved back to Calgary, and with the creation of the Supreme Court of Alberta in 1907 to which Harvey was appointed on September 16, 1907, he moved to Edmonton.

=== Chief Justice of Alberta ===
Alongside Harvey, two other judges from the Northwest Territories Court made the transition to the Alberta Court: David Lynch Scott and Arthur Sifton. The latter was appointed the first Chief Justice of Alberta. When Sifton became the Premier of the province in 1910, Harvey was elevated to the position of Chief Justice of Alberta by letters patent issued October 12, 1910.

It is important to recognize that when the new Supreme Court of Alberta was formed, it comprised a trial division and an appellate division (essentially, brother justices of the Supreme Court sitting en banc with a quorum of three). Harvey supported an independent appellate court designed only to hear appeals. The Judicature Act enacted these changes in 1919, and it was proclaimed in 1921. The proper way to have done this would have been to abolish the old Supreme Court and create two new courts: one for trials, another solely for appeals. However, due to "slipshod and inartistic" drafting, the enacting statute merely created an independent appeal court without abolishing the old Supreme Court of Alberta.

Although Harvey expected to become the Chief Justice of the Appellate Division and thus Chief Justice of Alberta, his judicial appointments had all been made by a Liberal Prime Minister Sir Wilfrid Laurier who had been in office from 1896 to 1911. By the time the two courts were separated in 1919, Conservative Prime Minister Arthur Meighen was in office. Instead of Harvey, Meighen appointed the conservative Scott by federal letters patent dated September 15, 1921. Much to Harvey's dismay, he became the Chief Justice of the Supreme Court Trial Division.

Harvey applied via reference to the Supreme Court of Canada in the case cited as Reference re Chief Justice of Alberta for a declaration that he, not Scott, was the Chief Justice of Alberta. By a four to two majority, the Supreme Court agreed with Harvey that he held the highest judicial office in Alberta.

Although Scott had declined to make an appearance before the Supreme Court, he appealed the decision to the Judicial Committee of the Privy Council. Lord Atkinson delivered the decision for the Committee in 1923, overturning the Supreme Court and finding in favour of Scott. Harvey continued to hold ill will, to the extent that at the first hearing convened by the appeal division, Harvey walked into the courtroom with Scott, told everyone he was the true Chief Justice, and then left Scott to preside. Scott's victory was nevertheless short lived as Scott died less than a year after the Judicial Committee's decision.

Harvey was then appointed to Scott's position as Chief Justice of Alberta on August 27, 1924, by Liberal Prime Minister William Lyon Mackenzie King. He held this position until his death on September 9, 1949.

=== Conscription Crisis ===
Harvey played a key role in the Conscription Stand Off of 1918, part of the larger Conscription Crisis of 1917 during World War I. The federal government passed the Military Service Act in 1917, introducing conscription in Canada. However, it contained many exceptions for classes of people such as farmers. In 1918, the shortage of men was dire, and the Canadian Cabinet issued an order-in-council rescinding those exemptions. Norman Earl Lewis was conscripted and hired lawyer and future Prime Minister R. B. Bennett to apply for a writ of habeas corpus in the Supreme Court of Alberta.

The hearing before the Court was presided by then Chief Justice Harvey along with four justices on June 21 and 22, 1918. The Court held that since the exemptions had been passed by Parliament, it was not constitutional for a mere order-in-council to remove those exemptions. Harvey was the lone dissenting voice. This was quite problematic for the government as within two weeks, over 20 other applications for habeas corpus had been made.

However, rather than produce the conscripts before the Court, the Canadian military was ordered by the highest-ranking military official in Canada and supported by the federal government to ignore the ruling. The Court issued a writ of attachment against Lieutenant-Colonel Moore, the commanding officer at Sarcee Barracks in Calgary, for failure to comply with the order to produce the conscripts. However, the sheriff on his way to arrest the officer was met by military resistance, specifically newly set up machine guns around the headquarters. Harvey viewed these circumstances as being an affront to the jurisdiction of the Courts to declare laws unconstitutional as he wrote: "This seems to me that the military authorities and the executive government of Canada have set at defiance the highest Court in this province."

Indeed, military officers produced in court an order in council that ordered the conscripts in question to "be dealt with in all respects as provided by the [earlier] orders in council notwithstanding the judgment and notwithstanding any judgment or any order that may be made by any Court." On July 12, 1918, Harvey issued an order to have the military explain its actions before the Court or the Court would employ the sheriff and all the able bodied men in the jurisdiction to seize the conscripts by force.

Eventually, a compromise was reached at Calgary City Hall whereby the military command in Alberta would notify the sheriff within 24 hours before the men were required to leave Alberta for eastern Canada. A similar Ontario case reached the Supreme Court of Canada the following week, which upheld the order-in-council as being constitutionally valid on July 19, 1918.

=== Notable decisions ===
- R. v. Cyr [1917] 12 ALR 1st 320
- McPherson v. McPherson [1933] 1 WWR 321
- Hatfield v. Healy [1911] 3 ALR 1st 327
- Credit Foncier Franco-Canadian v. Ross [1937] 2 WWR 353

=== University of Alberta ===
Harvey was the Chairman of the Board of Governors of the University of Alberta from 1917 to 1940.

=== Other work ===
Harvey wrote by himself, the Alberta Rules of Court in 1914 which were not substantially revised until 1944.

He also served on many boards, including as Chairman of the Mobilization Board for National Services in 1940, and member of the Commission on Alberta and Great Waterways Railway scandal in 1910; the Royal Commission to Investigate an Agreement between the City of Calgary and the Calgary Natural Gas Company Ltd in 1919; an Inquiry into the McGillivray Creek Coal and Coke Company Ltd. explosion in 1927, and the Commission regarding the Administration of Justice in 1934.

== Place in history ==
=== House converted to Official Residence ===
Harvey purchased three lots in the Glenora district of Edmonton in 1914 which he kept until 1946. He cleared and fenced the land and built a tea house on it. In the morning, he would walk from his nearby house to the land to work in his garden, where he had prized gladioli. This land would later house the official residence for Alberta's Lieutenant Governors from 1966 until 2000. The current official residence remains in the area.

=== Honours ===
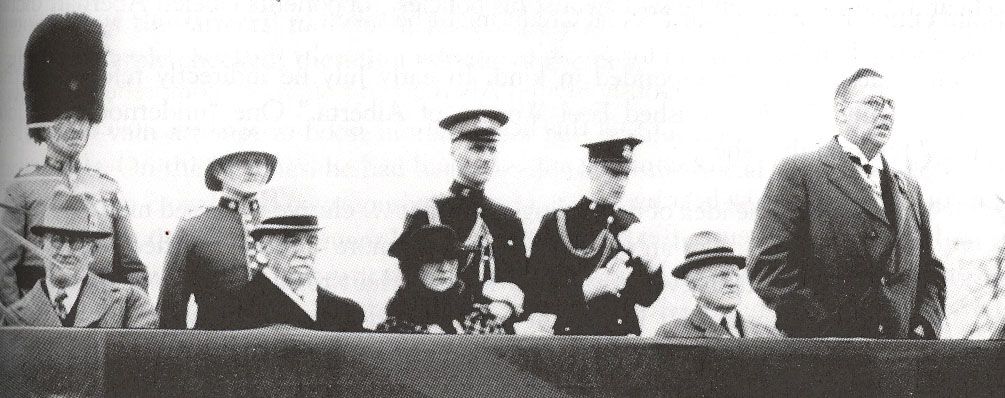
Harvey, sitting far right, listening to a speech in Edmonton on the occasion of George V's silver jubilee in 1935

Harvey was the longest serving Chief Justice, having sat on the bench for 44 years, longer than any other judge in Alberta's history. In his honour, the University of Alberta Faculty of Law awards the graduating student with the highest GPA over the three year Bachelor of Laws program the Horace Harvey Gold Medal in Law.

He received an honorary Doctor of Laws degree from the Universities of Alberta and Toronto in 1915 and 1936 respectively, and Yale Law School made him a Fellowship in the Order of the Coif.

He died on September 9, 1948, in Edmonton, Alberta.

== See also ==
- Alberta Court of Appeal The modern day Supreme Court Appellate Division
- Alberta Court of Queen's Bench The modern day Supreme Court Trial Division
