= Moylist Construction Limited v Doheny =

2016 Irish Supreme Court case

- Coat of arms of Ireland
- Court: Supreme Court of Ireland
- Full case name: Moylist Construction Limited (Appellant) v Thomas Doheny, Deloitte & Touche, Ulster Bank Limited and Tom O’Carroll (Respondents)
- Decided: 4 March 2016
- Citations: [2016] IESC 9; [2016] 2 IR 283

Case history
- Appealed from: Moylist Construction Ltd v Doheny and Others [2010] IEHC 162, [2010] 2 ILRM 470

Court membership
- Judges sitting: Clarke J, Dunne J, O'Malley J

Case opinions
- A court should not entertain an application to dismiss proceedings where the legal issues or questions of construction arising in the case are complex and such as would require the type of careful analysis that could only be carried out safely at a full trial and in circumstances where the facts could be fully explored.
- Decision by: Clarke J
- Concurrence: Dunne J, O'Malley J

Keywords
- Dismissal of proceedings; Bound to fail; Jurisdiction to dismiss

Moylist Construction Limited v Doheny, [2016] IESC 9, [2016] 2 IR 283 was an Irish Supreme Court case in which the Supreme Court confirmed the Irish courts’ jurisdiction to strike out (dismiss) weak cases—those it considered “bound to fail."

== Background ==
Moylist Construction Limited acted as the contractor in a building contract involving the construction of 18 holiday homes in Ballybunion, County Kerry. Funding for the purchase of the lands on which the development was to take place and the construction of the holiday homes was provided by Ulster Bank. In 2007, Moylist Construction Limited suspended work on the development and in 2008 issued a summary summons against Mr O’Carroll (the fourth respondent) for payment of monies owed for work done and services rendered. In 2009, Ulster Bank demanded repayment of the monies secured by a mortgage over the relevant properties and then appointed the first respondent as receiver under its powers arising from the mortgage. The receiver took possession of the development. Moylist Construction Limited then commenced proceedings in which it claimed that the receiver and Ulster Bank had wrongfully dispossessed Moylist Construction Limited of its entitlement to occupy the development on foot of the building contract entered into between Mr O’Carroll and Moylist Construction Limited. Moylist Construction Limited sought an interlocutory injunction to restrain any interference with its occupation of the lands. The first, second and third respondents brought applications seeking to have the proceedings dismissed as being bound to fail. In the High Court, Laffoy J declined to grant the injunction sought, and acceded to the application to dismiss the proceedings as being bound to fail. Moylist Construction Limited appealed the dismissal of the proceedings against the receiver and Ulster Bank.

== Holding of the Supreme Court ==
=== Inherent jurisdiction to strike out proceedings as being bound to fail ===
Clarke J delivered the only written judgment for the Supreme Court (with which the other judges agreed). The Supreme Court noted that at least since the decision of Costello J in Barry v Buckley, “it has been clear that the courts have an inherent jurisdiction to strike out proceedings as being bound to fail, which jurisdiction is in addition to the somewhat separate entitlement of a court to strike out proceedings under Order 19, rule 28 of the Rules of the Superior Courts 1986.” The Supreme Court went on to note that the underlying basis of that jurisdiction stems from the court's “inherent entitlement to prevent an abuse of process.”

However, the Supreme Court also noted that the jurisdiction to strike out proceedings as being bound to fail is to be exercised sparingly and is only intended to deal with the “slam dunk” situations where it is clear that the proceedings are bound to fail. The default position in respect of any proceedings is, therefore, that they should go to trial as “[d]epriving the parties of a full trial … is a departure from the norm, and one which should only be engaged in when it is clear that there is no real risk of injustice in adopting that course of action.” The Supreme Court then went on to consider cases that are not suitable for an application to dismiss under the inherent jurisdiction to strike out proceedings as being bound to fail. These include most cases involving factual disputes and cases where the relevant legal issues or questions of construction are complex and such as would require the type of careful analysis that could only be carried out safely at a full trial and in circumstances where the facts could be fully explored.

=== Arguing new grounds in an appeal ===
As part of the appeal, the receiver and Ulster Bank also argued that the case made on appeal by Moylist Construction Limited differed considerably from the case made in the High Court. The Supreme Court noted that it needed to balance the risks faced by a party if they are excluded from arguing a new ground and the potential unfairness to the other party if they are permitted to do so. However, the Supreme Court also noted that where an appeal relates to an application to dismiss as being bound to fail, an additional factor had to be brought into the balancing exercise, that is, the fact that the appellant concerned would, if the application to dismiss is ultimately successful, “be deprived of their opportunity to have a full hearing at all. That factor will not be decisive, but it may tip the balance in an appropriate case.”

=== Conclusion ===
Clarke J concluded that the present case was “just too complex to be properly disposed of in the context of an application to dismiss as being bound to fail.” The Supreme Court therefore allowed the appeal and discharged the order made by the High Court.
