= Alberta Law Review =

- Discipline: Law
- Language: English

Publication details
- Former name: Alberta Law Quarterly
- History: 1955-present
- Publisher: The Alberta Law Review Society (Canada)
- Frequency: Quarterly

Standard abbreviations
- ISO 4: Alta. Law Rev.

Indexing
- ISSN: 0002-4821
- LCCN: cn76300348
- OCLC no.: 01479040

Links
- Journal homepage; Online access; Online archive

The Alberta Law Review is a peer-reviewed law review or legal journal, published quarterly by the Alberta Law Review Society. The Society is a non-profit organization consisting entirely of students from both the University of Alberta Faculty of Law and the University of Calgary Faculty of Law.

The Law Review has published issues consistently since 1955. Nonetheless, its predecessor, the Alberta Law Quarterly, was established in 1934 by University of Alberta law students. Its purpose is to publish "articles, case comments, and book reviews authored by academics, practitioners and judges, in order to create a valuable dialogue within the legal profession." In 2016, the Alberta Law Review transitioned from a print-based subscription model to an online-based open-access distribution model.

== Organization ==
The Law Review is unique from other law reviews in Canada in that it is operated by students from two law schools, whereas other reviews are typically staffed by students of one school. The editorial board is chosen from second year law students by the editors-in-chief. The University of Alberta editors elect two editors-in-chief and the University of Calgary editors elect one Associate Editor-in-Chief. The activities of the Law Review are funded partly by subscriptions worldwide and through funds provided by the Law Society of Alberta.

The work of the Law Review is conducted primarily at the Hon. W. A. Stevenson House, located in the University of Alberta's East Campus Village. The house is named after the Law Review's founding editor, the Hon. W. A. Stevenson, who subsequently became a Puisne Justice of the Supreme Court of Canada and continues to support the Law Review as adviser and benefactor.

== Notable past editors ==
Other than Hon. W.A. Stevenson mentioned above, former editors include Beverly McLachlin, the Chief Justice of Canada, and numerous members of the Court of Appeal of Alberta such as the Hon. Jean E.L. Côté and the Hon. Peter T. Costigan.

== Energy Law Edition ==
One of four issues published annually, known as the "Energy Law Issue" in the Law Review consists entirely of energy law related articles. The articles are typically presented at an annual conference in Jasper, Alberta.
