= ABPC =

ABPC may refer to:

- Associated British Picture Corporation, a British film production, distribution and exhibition company active 1927–1970
- Provincial Court of Alberta, a former name of the Alberta Court of Justice
