= Jolaine Antonio =

Canadian jurist and former crown prosecutor

The Honourable Jolaine Antonio

Justice of the Alberta Court of Appeal
- Incumbent
- Assumed office December 13, 2018
- Nominated by: Justin Trudeau
- Preceded by: Sheilah Martin

Justice of the Court of King's Bench of Alberta
- Incumbent
- Assumed office October 20, 2016
- Preceded by: Rosemary Nation
- Succeeded by: Nicholas Devlin

Personal details
- Born: January 1, 1964 (age 62)
- Education: University of Calgary (BSc); Dalhousie University (LLB)
- Occupation: judge

Jolaine Antonio is a Canadian jurist and former crown prosecutor. She is currently a justice of the Alberta Court of Appeal.

== Early life and education ==
Jolaine Antonio earned a Bachelor of Science with Distinction in Astrophysics from the University of Calgary in 1991. She went on to receive a Bachelor of Laws (LL.B.) from Dalhousie University in 1994.

== Career ==
Antonio’s legal career began as a Crown Prosecutor with Justice Alberta (1997–2002) before moving on to various roles with the Department of Justice Canada and Public Prosecution Service of Canada. From 2008 to 2016, she served as Appellant Counsel with Alberta Justice in Calgary. Antonio appeared before a wide range of courts, including the Supreme Court of Canada, Alberta Court of Appeal, and Federal Court of Canada, gaining extensive experience in criminal law, administrative law, tax law, and civil litigation.

In 2016, she was appointed to the Alberta Court of King's Bench. In 2018, she was appointed to the Alberta Court of Appeal, replacing Justice Sheilah Martin after the latter appointment to the Supreme Court, and also became a judge of the Court of Appeal for the Northwest Territories and Nunavut.

Throughout her career, Justice Antonio has been recognized for her leadership and advocacy in legal education and has spoken at various organizations, including the National Judicial Institute and the University of Calgary. In 2015, she received the Women in Law Leadership Award for her contributions to the legal profession.
