= William A. McGillivray =

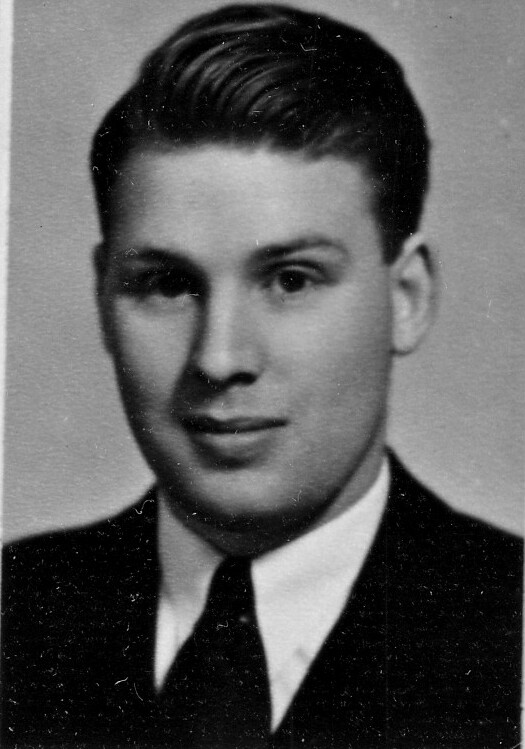
- McGillivray as a student in 1940.

Chief Justice of Alberta, Canada
- In office 1974–1984
- Preceded by: S. Bruce Smith
- Succeeded by: James Herbert Laycraft

Personal details
- Born: October 14, 1918 Calgary, Alberta, Canada
- Died: December 16, 1984 (aged 66) Calgary, Alberta, Canada
- Education: University of Alberta
- Occupation: lawyer, judge

William Alexander McGillivray (October 14, 1918 – December 16, 1984) was a lawyer, jurist, and a Chief Justice of Alberta, Canada.

== Early life ==
McGillivray was born in Calgary, Alberta to Alexander Andrew McGillivray, a politician and justice of the Supreme Court of Alberta Appellate Division. He was educated at Victoria boarding school and a Calgary high school. McGillivray went on to receive Bachelor of Arts and Bachelor of Laws degrees from the University of Alberta in 1938 and 1941 respectively. At law school, he graduated first in his class, and received the Horace Harvey Gold Medal in Law. He was also an avid sportsman, achieving provincial champion status in both tennis and table tennis.

== Career ==
McGillivray was admitted to the Alberta bar on June 23, 1942 and the Saskatchewan bar in 1965, and practiced in Calgary. He served as Bencher of the Law Society of Alberta from 1958–1969, and then as its President from 1969–1970, becoming Queen's Counsel on December 31, 1957. He practiced in Calgary with the law firm of Fenerty, McGillivray, Robertson, Prowse, Brennan, Fraser and Bell.

In 1974, McGillivray was appointed directly to the position of Chief Justice of Alberta and was therefore, like his father, a justice of the Supreme Court of Alberta Appellate Division. Once on the bench, he was known for writing many reported criminal law judgments. He served in this position until his death in 1984. During that time, he also served concurrently as Chief Justice of the Northwest Territories.

== Other ==
His son, Douglas A. McGillivray, K.C. was also President of the Law Society of Alberta from 2005-2006.
