= Bank of Ireland Mortgage Bank v Coleman =

Irish Supreme Court case

- Coat of arms of Ireland
- Court: Supreme Court of Ireland
- Decided: 5 May 2009

Case history
- Appealed from: Bank of Ireland Mortgage Bank v Coleman [2006] IEHC 337
- Appealed to: Bank of Ireland Mortgage Bank v Coleman [2009] IESC 38

Court membership
- Judges sitting: Geoghegan J, Fennelly J, Finlay J

Case opinions
- The court retains inherent disciplinary jurisdiction over its officers. While the jurisdiction is compensatory rather than punitive, it still retains a disciplinary aspect.
- Decision by: Geoghegan J.
- Concurrence: Fennelly J. Finnegan J

Keywords
- solicitors undertaking, mortgage, breach of contract, legal charge on property, special jurisdiction, negligent undervaluation

Bank of Ireland Mortgage Bank v Coleman [2009] IESC 38; [2009] 2 ILRM 363; [2009] 3 IR 699 is an Irish Supreme Court case in which the Court clarified the inherent jurisdiction of the court with respect of a solicitor's misconduct. The court also considered the remedies available where a solicitor is in breach of a solicitor's undertaking.

== Background ==
The Bank of Ireland Mortgage Bank ("Bank of Ireland") (the appellant in the appeal) brought a case in the High Court against Mr Coleman (the respondent in the appeal), a solicitor. The basis of Bank of Ireland's claim was that Mr Coleman had given a solicitor's undertaking (a commitment to do or not to do something) not to release €250,500 advanced by Bank of Ireland to Mr Coleman (acting as solicitor for a borrower) until Mr Coleman had ensured that the borrower would obtain good marketable title to the relevant property and that Bank of Ireland would have first legal charge over the property. In breach of this undertaking, Mr Coleman released the money without having received a "duly executed mortgage by the borrower in favour of the Bank of Ireland over the property being purchased by the borrower". Following default on the loan by the borrower, Bank of Ireland sought compensation for Mr Coleman's breach by requesting that the High Court exercise its "inherent jurisdiction ... over solicitors as its officers" by ordering Mr Coleman to repay the full €250,500, plus interest. Mr Coleman argued that it "was not a claim for debt nor a claim for damages for breach of contract nor a claim for conversion or money had and received or indeed for compensation or damages for breach of trust or breach of an agency agreement" and that any remedy that might be ordered was, therefore, discretionary.

In the High Court, Laffoy J concluded that Mr Coleman's obligation was to ensure that Bank of Ireland had proper security over the mortgaged property, something that Mr Coleman had failed to do. If it were impossible to comply with Mr Coleman's "ultimate obligation", then the correct amount of compensation should relate to the value of the security that Bank of Ireland should have obtained, not simply the amount of the loan. The High Court judge went on to note, however, that it was still possible for Mr Coleman to comply with the "ultimate obligation”. As a result, she dismissed Bank of Ireland's claim. Bank of Ireland appealed.

== Holding of the Supreme Court ==
In the Supreme Court, Geoghegan J provided the only written judgment, with which Fennelly J and Finnegan J concurred.

The Supreme Court largely agreed with the reasoning of Laffoy J in the High Court. The Supreme Court confirmed the position as outlined in IPLG Limited v Stuart that courts retain an inherent disciplinary jurisdiction over its officers. Geoghegan J noted the

“clear affirmation that the inherent jurisdiction of the court in respect of solicitors' misconduct still existed in Ireland notwithstanding that the Solicitors Act 1960 did not provide that solicitors were officers of the court but created the well known procedures of hearings by a disciplinary committee of the Law Society followed by hearings by the President of the High Court.”

Geoghegan J also referred to the statement of Bowen LJ in Re Grey that, “[I]f the jurisdiction of the court still exists, then it seems to me that, the matter being one of discretion, no hard and fast rules can be laid down whereby such discretion would be fettered”.

The court went on to note that when deciding upon the solicitor's undertaking, the overall outcome should be taken into account rather than singular aspects of the undertaking. The Supreme Court agreed with Laffoy J in the High Court in that it would be inappropriate to order Mr Coleman to repay €250,500 with or without interest when the Bank by its own negligence had "provided loan facilities on an overvaluation of the property."

However, the Supreme Court disagreed with Laffoy J's finding that, if it was still possible for the respondent to complete the undertaking, compensation should not be awarded. The Supreme Court concluded that the jurisdiction is not merely supervisory. "While the jurisdiction is compensatory rather than punitive, it still retains a disciplinary aspect." Since the High Court hearing, Bank of Ireland's security interest had been correctly put in place. Despite this, "there was a serious and inexcusable breach of the defendant's obligations not just in relation to the payment but in relation to the undertaking as a whole" and losses had been suffered. Therefore the appeal was allowed by the Supreme Court and remitted back to the High Court where the scale of Bank of Ireland's losses could be assessed.

== See also ==
Mortgage loan
