= William Haddad (disambiguation) =

William Haddad may refer to:

- William Haddad – American political operative, lobbyist, and journalist (1928–2020)
- William J. Haddad – Canadian lawyer and jurist

== See also ==
- Haddad – Arabic surname
- Wassim Michael Haddad – Lebanese-Greek-American mathematician
- Hadad – Semitic storm god
