= Clinton Ford =

Clinton Ford may refer to:

- Clinton Ford (singer) (1931–2009), British singer
- Clinton B. Ford (1913–1992), American astronomer and violinist
- Clinton J. Ford (1882–1964), Canadian lawyer and judge
- Clint Ford (born 1976), American screenwriter and actor
