= Alexander McGillivray (politician) =

Canadian politician

Alexander Andrew McGillivray KC
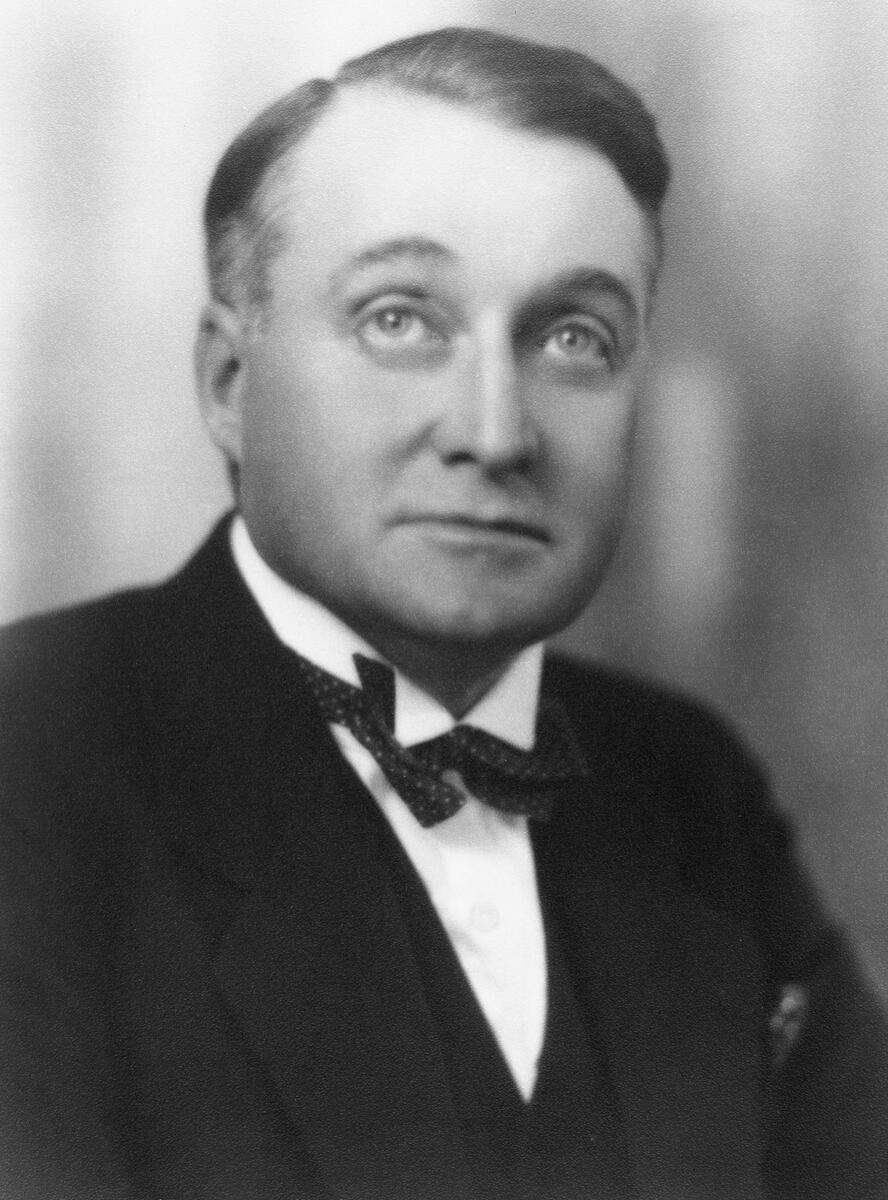

MLA for Calgary
- In office 1926–1930
- Preceded by: Alex Ross; Robert Marshall; Robert Pearson; William Davidson
- Succeeded by: Harold McGill; John Bowlen; Hugh Farthing

Personal details
- Born: February 11, 1884 London, Ontario, Canada
- Died: December 12, 1940 (aged 56) Edmonton, Alberta, Canada
- Party: Conservative

Alexander Andrew McGillivray KC (February 11, 1884 – December 12, 1940) was a lawyer and provincial level politician from Alberta, Canada. He served as a member of the Legislative Assembly of Alberta representing the electoral district of Calgary from 1926 to 1930. He served as leader of the Alberta Conservative party from 1925 to 1929.

== Early life ==
Alexander Andrew McGillivray was born in London, Ontario, on February 11, 1884. After High School he attended St. Francis College in Richmond, Quebec and later attended Dalhousie University, receiving his LLB in 1906.

== Career ==
=== Early career ===
After completing university he moved to Alberta in 1907 and admitted to the bar on May 14, 1907. McGillivray practiced in Stettler, Alberta, until 1910 quitting his practice to run as a candidate in the 1911 federal election.

After failing to win a seat, McGillivray moved to Calgary and started a law firm with Thomas Tweedie. He later became Crown Prosecutor, King's Counsellor in 1919, and led the prosecution of Emilio Picariello and Florence Lassandro for murder of Alberta Provincial Police Constable Stephen O. Lawson. Both Picariello and Lassandro would be found guilty and hung in Fort Saskatchewan on May 2, 1923. McGillivray would continue to serve as a Crown Prosecutor until he was elected leader of the Alberta Conservative Party in 1925.

=== Political career ===
McGillivray ran for a seat to the House of Commons of Canada in the 1911 federal election. He was defeated by incumbent Member of Parliament Michael Clark.

McGillivray became leader of the provincial Conservatives in 1925. He worked tirelessly to build the party's organization across the province that had diminished after the party lost all their seats in the 1921 Alberta general election. In the 1926 election, the Conservatives picked up four seats including McGillivray's in Calgary.

McGillivray ran in the Calgary provincial electoral district. He headed the polls and was the only candidate elected on the first count.

McGillivray stepped down as Conservative leader in 1929 and did not run for office again.

=== Judicial career ===
McGillivray was appointed directly to the Supreme Court of Alberta Appellate Division in 1931 at the age of 47, becoming one of the youngest Supreme Court justices of Appeal in Canada. In 1938 McGillivray was appointed commissioner for the Royal Commission of Inquiry into the Alberta oil industry (known as the "McGillivray Report"), which was intended to attract investment and value for the province's oil industry. The report would recommend measures to preserve the Turner Valley oil field and provide the right for oil companies to appeal unfavorable regulatory rulings on energy development to the courts.

The Toronto Mail hailed McGillivray as one of the most brilliant practicing barristers in Western Canada. He died of a heart attack, on December 12, 1940, in Edmonton, while still a member of the Court.

== Family ==
McGillivray's son, William A. McGillivray, became the Chief Justice of Alberta, and his grandson, Douglas A. McGillivray, K.C., was President of the Law Society of Alberta.
