= Law Courts (Edmonton) =

Coordinates: 53°32′44″N 113°29′16″W

Provincial Courthouse of Alberta (Law Courts, Edmonton)
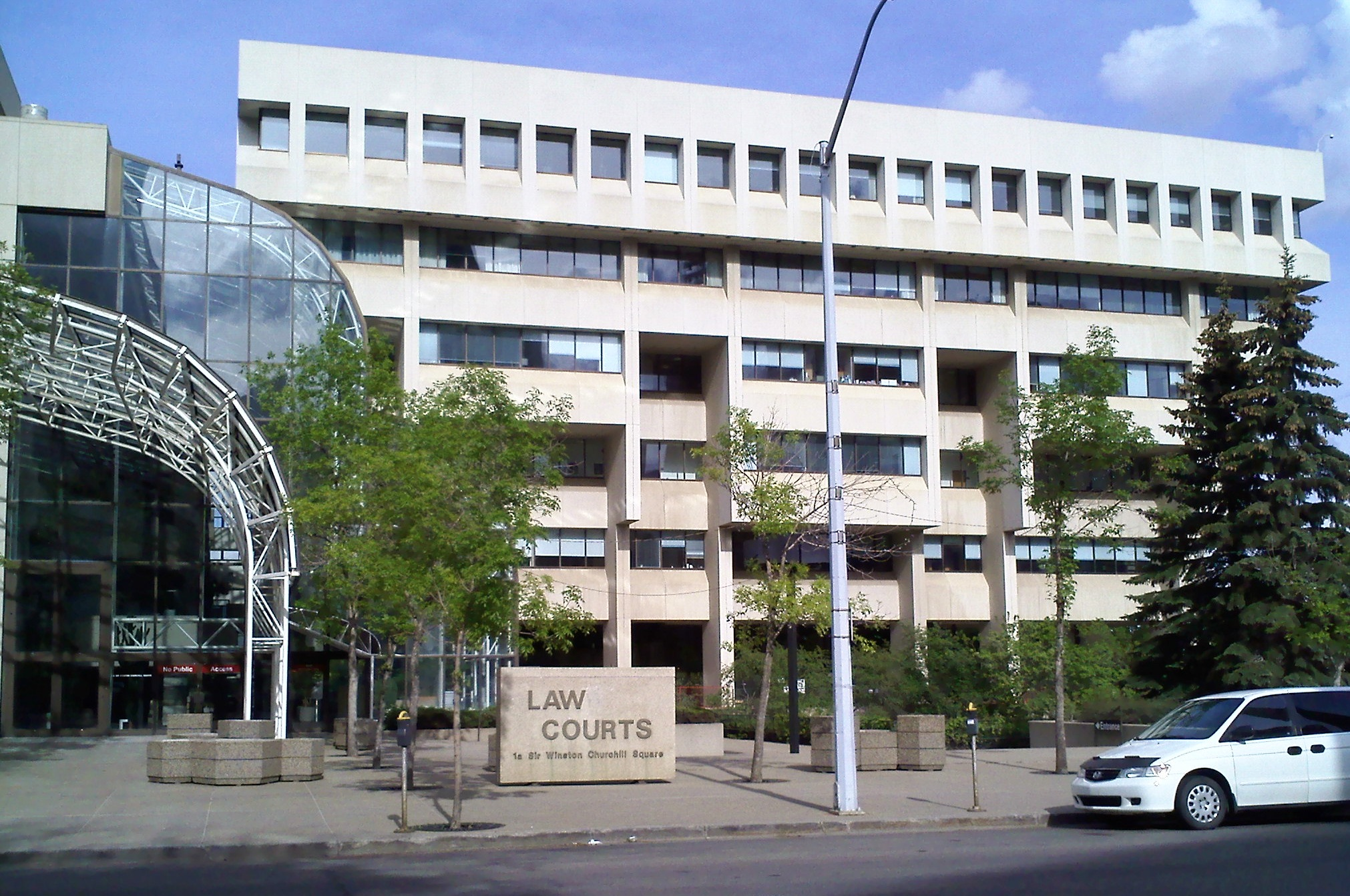
- Interactive map of the Provincial Courthouse of Alberta (Law Courts, Edmonton) area

General information
- Type: Office building
- Architectural style: Brutalist
- Location: 1A Sir Winston Churchill Square, Edmonton, Alberta, Canada
- Construction started: 1972
- Opened: 1973
- Owner: Ministry of Justice and Solicitor General of Alberta
- Landlord: Government of Alberta

Technical details
- Floor count: 6

Design and construction
- Architecture firm: Bell, McCulloch, Spotowski and Associates

Other information
- Public transit: Churchill station

The Law Courts building is the main courthouse in the city of Edmonton, the capital of Alberta, Canada. It hosts hearings of the Provincial Court of Alberta, the Court of King's Bench of Alberta, and the Court of Appeal of Alberta. The courthouse is located at 1A Sir Winston Churchill Square, in downtown Edmonton. The building was designed by the firm Bell, McCulloch, Spotowski and Associates.

== History ==
During Edmonton's years as a frontier settlement, and later as a booming railway hub in the North-West Territories, Edmonton's courts lacked a purpose-built courthouse and relied on rented space. Edmonton was repeatedly passed over while purpose-built courthouses were constructed in much smaller, younger settlements. This finally changed when Edmonton became the capital of the new province of Alberta.

In 1908, construction began on a new Beaux-Arts/Greek Revival courthouse, on what is now the west side of Churchill Square, to the southwest of the current Law Courts where the Edmonton City Centre mall now stands. The building was completed in 1912 and demolished in 1972.

The current building, in brutalist style, was built in the early 1970s and is reminiscent of Boston City Hall and 222 Jarvis Street in Toronto, Ontario.

== Services ==
As of April 2012, Edmonton's automated traffic ticketing is operated by City of Edmonton's Office of Traffic Safety, overseen by The Edmonton Police Service according to the Provincial Automated Enforcement Technology Guidelines. Red light camera and photo radar tickets are payable in person at the courthouse.

Those with matters to be heard in front of the court are able to advance book any audio-visual equipment they may require via an online request form.
