= William J. Haddad =

Canadian lawyer and jurist

William Joseph Haddad, QC (November 26, 1915 – February 7, 2010) was a lawyer and jurist in Alberta, Canada.

== Early life ==
Haddad was born in Meyronne, Saskatchewan, and moved to Edmonton in 1938. He attended the University of Alberta, graduating in 1941 with degrees in arts and law.

== Career ==
=== Lawyer ===
Upon graduation, Haddad served in the Royal Canadian Navy as a lawyer during World War II, achieving the rank of Lieutenant. He was President of the Edmonton Bar Association in 1954 and took silk by becoming Queen's Counsel in 1957.

=== Justice ===
Haddad was appointed to the District Court of Alberta in 1965 and was elevated to the Appellate Division in 1974, retiring in 1991.

== Family and later years ==
Haddad had three children, Gail, Ronald and Kenneth.

Upon retirement, Haddad worked until the age of 93 for the Federal Courts as an umpire under the Employment Insurance Act. He also served on the Hospital Privileges Board and set up a bursary in his name at the University of Alberta Faculty of Law.
