= Civil procedure in Canada =

In Canada, the rules of civil procedure are administered separately by each jurisdiction, both federal and provincial. Nine provinces and three territories in Canada are common law jurisdictions. One province, Quebec, is governed by civil law.

In all provinces and territories, there is an inferior and superior court. For certain matters, jurisdiction lies at first instance with the Federal Court. In all cases, the final court of appeal is the Supreme Court of Canada.

== Jurisdictions ==
=== Ontario ===
Ontario's civil procedure is governed by its Rules of Civil Procedure. Its stated aim is "to secure the just, most expeditious and least expensive determination of every civil proceeding on its merits." Most civil cases in Canada are tried by judges without a jury. Although the claims of civil proceeding are permitted to be tried before a jury, courts have broad discretion to strike the jury and proceed with a judge-only trial.

The Ontario Rules of Civil Procedure have been largely adopted by Manitoba, Prince Edward Island, and the Northwest Territories.

Before starting a court case, there are other options, such as negotiation, mediation, and arbitration.

There is a flow chart from the Justice Ontario which summarizes civil procedure, where the steps of mediation is shown in page 12 in the chart.

==== Mediation ====
Mediation is one way for people to settle disputes or lawsuits outside of court. In Ontario, Rule 24.1 of the Rules of Civil Procedure establishes mandatory mediation for civil cases, excluding certain family actions. The mediation is through a private-sector mediator. In mediation, a neutral third party – the mediator – helps the disputing parties look for a solution that works for them. Over 90 percent of all lawsuits settle before getting to the trial stage. Under the Ontario Mandatory Mediation Program, cases are referred to a mediation session early in the litigation process to give parties an opportunity to discuss the issues in dispute.

There are time-sensitive actions for mediation.

- Parties may agree to select a within 30 days after the first defense is filed, or a mediator will be appointed for them by the Local Mediation Coordinator. Parties and mediator may discuss mediator's fees and expenses, mediator's references, times and dates that mediation sessions can be scheduled.
- The mediation must take place within 90 days after the first defense is filed.
- The parties must give the mediator and the other parties with a Statement of Issues at least 7 days before the mediation.

The lawyer is expected to prepare Statement of Issues, and work with the client to prepare an opening statement. All parties have to attend the mediation session, including their lawyers. The mediation session may last up three hours. The session may be held at any location that is convenient and acceptable to all parties.

See Mediation#Canada for more details.

==== Legal information and referral services ====
There are free Legal information and referral services offered on a confidential basis funded from government (The Access to Justice Fund) for all areas of law in major cities, such as, Ottawa Legal Information Centre.

=== Quebec ===
Quebec is Canada's only civil law jurisdiction. Therefore, its rules of civil procedure are distinct from the rest of the country. In 2003, Quebec introduced a series of changes to its civil law, where it eliminated the statement of claim. Instead, all actions are brought by way of motion.

== Inherent jurisdiction ==
The courts may also exercise inherent jurisdiction to control their own processes, but inherent jurisdiction cannot be exercised so as to conflict with a statute or rule. As a result, if a process has been contemplated by the civil procedure a court does not have the authority to alter or dispense compliance with that process.

The noted exception to the required compliance with the civil procedure is that the rules themselves often contain a rule which permits a court to

only where and as necessary in the interest of justice, dispense with compliance with any rule at any time.

The onus is on the party seeking to dispense with compliance with a rule to demonstrate that it is in the interest of justice.

== Alternative dispute resolution ==
Alternative dispute resolution proceedings and administrative law proceedings both tend to have relatively simple rules of procedure, in comparison to the highly formalized procedures seen in the federal and provincial courts.
