= Shannon Smallwood =

Canadian jurist

Shannon H. Smallwood is the chief justice of the Supreme Court of the Northwest Territories, joining in 2012. She is a member of the Dene First Nations group. On September 23, 2022, Prime Minister Justin Trudeau appointed Smallwood as chief justice effective September 22, 2022.
