= Clinton J. Ford =

Canadian lawyer and judge

The Honourable Clinton J. Ford

Chief Justice of the Court of Appeal of Alberta
- In office January 17, 1957 – March 1, 1961

Personal details
- Born: March 29, 1882 Corinth, Ontario
- Died: November 16, 1964 (aged 82)
- Education: University of Toronto
- Occupation: judge, lawyer

Clinton James Ford (March 29, 1882 – November 16, 1964) was a Canadian lawyer and judge. He was the Chief Justice of Alberta from 1957 to 1961.

Ford graduated from the University of Toronto in 1907, then studied law at Osgoode Hall. He was admitted to the Alberta Bar in 1910 and practiced in Calgary. He was appointed to the District Court in 1942, to the Trial Division of the Supreme Court of Alberta in 1945, and in 1950 to the Appellate Division. In 1957, he became Chief Justice of Alberta, and retired in 1961.
