= Allan Wachowich =

The Honourable Allan H.J. Wachowich CM AOE KC (born March 8, 1935) is the former Chief Justice of the Court of Queen's Bench of Alberta.

== Early life ==
Allan Harvey Joseph Wachowich was born to Polish-Ukrainian parents Philip and Nancy. His family was one of the first five Polish families to immigrate to Alberta in 1897, setting down in Opal, Alberta, but moving to Edmonton when Allan was nine years old. His parents had eight children of which Allan was the seventh. He has an older brother and six sisters.

Wachowich attended St. Joseph's High School, played for the basketball team, and was elected president of his graduating class. A Catholic, Wachowich served as an altar boy at St. Joseph's Basilica and originally intended to become a priest.

== Career ==
Wachowich received his Bachelor of Arts in 1957 and his Bachelor of Laws degree in 1958, both from the University of Alberta. He was called to Alberta Bar in 1959, the Northwest Territories Bar in 1963, and the Yukon Bar in 1964. He founded the firm of Kosowan, Wachowich and was a partner there from 1959 until his first judicial appointment in 1974.

He was appointed a Judge of the District Court of Alberta in 1974 by the Liberal government of Pierre Trudeau and then a Judge of the Court of Queen's Bench of Alberta when the district and supreme courts merged in 1979. He was appointed Associate Chief Justice of the Court of Queen's Bench in 1993 and Chief Justice of the Court of Queen's Bench on January 24, 2001, by Liberal Prime Minister Jean Chrétien, following the retirement of Chief Justice W. Kenneth Moore, QC. He has admitted over 600 lawyers to the Alberta Bar, a record.

He tendered his resignation as Chief Justice with effect on October 1, 2009. He then assumed supernumerary (part-time) status with the Court until he reached the mandatory retirement age of 75 in March 2010.

== Community work ==
He has served on the boards of many religious organizations, including the Western Catholic Reporter, the Friars, the Canadian Catholic Organization for Development and Peace, Catholic Charities, and he founded the St. Thomas More Catholic Lawyers' Guild in 1963. He was president of the Mu Theta chapter of Zeta Psi fraternity.

On 28 Sept 2008 he accepted an Honorary Colonel appointment to 15 (Edmonton) Field Ambulance for an initial term of three years. As Colonel, the Honorable Allan Wachowich, he has attended military functions with his unit and attended national meetings of Honorary Colonels and Lieutenant-Colonels. 15 (Edmonton) Field Ambulance is a Reserve Force unit of the Canadian Forces Health Services Group.

Prior to his judicial appointments, he was an active campaigner for the Liberal Party of Canada.

In 2012, Wachowich received an honorary doctorate degree from the University of Alberta as a doctor in LL.D and now has the designation of King's Counsel in Alberta. He has also received the Alberta Order of Excellence (2018) and is a member of the Order of Canada (2019).

== Personal life ==
He married his wife Elizabeth (Bette) Louise Byers in 1959 in Ponoka, Alberta, and together they have four children: David, Patrick, Jane, and Nancy. Two of their children, David Wachowich and Jane Wachowich are lawyers who work and live in Calgary. Two are educators: Patrick Wachowich is a high school science teacher in Edmonton and Dr. Nancy Wachowich is a lecturer in Social Anthropology at University of Aberdeen, Aberdeen, Scotland.

Allan and Bette have eight grandchildren.

Allan's older brother, Edward Wachowich, was the Chief Judge of the Provincial Court of Alberta until his retirement in 1999.
