= James Herbert Laycraft =

Judge in Alberta, Canada

Chief Justice of Alberta, Canada
- In office 1984–1991
- Preceded by: William A. McGillivray
- Succeeded by: Catherine Fraser

Personal details
- Born: January 5, 1924 Veteran, Alberta, Canada
- Died: August 5, 2015 (aged 91) Calgary, Alberta, Canada
- Education: University of Alberta
- Occupation: lawyer, judge

James Herbert "Herb" Laycraft, QC (January 5, 1924 – August 5, 2015) was a judge in the Canadian province of Alberta. Born in Veteran, Alberta, he is a veteran of World War II, serving with the Royal Canadian Artillery in Australia.

Laycraft was admitted to the Alberta bar in 1952 after attending the University of Alberta. In the late 1960s, Laycraft joined Horace Johnson and William Stevenson on the committee to revise the Alberta Rules of Court. He was appointed Queen's Counsel in 1963 and to the bench in 1975, Laycraft was Chief Justice of the Alberta Court of Appeal from 1985 to December 31, 1991, when he retired.

He died on August 5, 2015, aged 91. The Calgary Herald opined, "It’s hard to fathom how different the legal profession might be today for Albertans and the rest of Canadians, for that matter, if not for the gigantic footprints left behind by James Herbert (Herb) Laycraft over a momentous four-decade career as a litigator and judge."
