= George Bligh O'Connor =

The Honourable George Bligh O'Connor
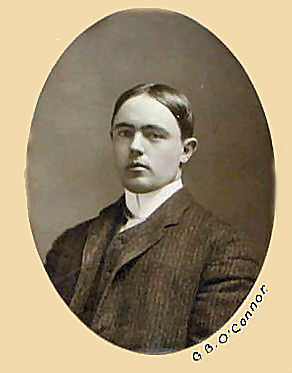
- O'Connor in a 1905 Osgoode Hall Law School class composite photograph.
- Education: Osgoode Hall Law School

George Bligh O'Connor (March 16, 1883 – January 13, 1956) was a Canadian lawyer and judge. He was Chief Justice of Alberta from 1950 to 1956.

The University of Alberta offers a scholarship in his name. O'Connor Close (originally O'Connor Place) in Edmonton is also named after him.

== Biography ==
O'Connor was born in Walkerton, Ontario on March 16, 1883. His father, Frederick Sheperd O'Connor, was the sheriff of Bruce County. His younger brother was Gerald O'Connor, who would later also go on to serve as a politician and judge in Alberta. O'Connor was the great-grandson of George Hamilton, the founder of Hamilton, Ontario.

O'Connor studied law at Osgoode Hall, where he graduated silver medallist in 1905. He began to practice law in Edmonton in 1905 and was appointed King's Counsel in 1913. O'Connor also married Hannah Margaret Fairlie in 1913. They had one daughter, Margaret Isabel O'Connor, who was born in 1915.

In 1920, he became the president of the Edmonton Bar Association through 1921. He was appointed to the Supreme Court of Alberta in 1941. In 1944, he was named the chairman of the Wartime Labour Relations Board and was later appointed to be the chairman of the Canada Labour Relations Board.

O'Connor was a member of the Anglican Church and served as a vestryman. He was also a Master Mason, belonged to the Edmonton Country Club and supported the Liberal Party.

He became Chief Justice of Alberta in 1950. In 1952, he was awarded an honorary degree from the University of Alberta. He died of a heart attack in 1956.
