= S. Bruce Smith =

Canadian lawyer and judge

Sidney Bruce Smith (1899 – April 1984) was a Canadian lawyer and judge. He was Chief Justice of Alberta from 1961 to 1974.

== Biography ==
Born in Ontario, Smith was educated at the University of Alberta (BA 1919; LLB 1922). He was called to the Alberta Bar in 1921 and practiced with the Edmonton firm of Smith, Clement, Parlee, Whittaker, Irving, Mustard and Rodney from 1931 to 1959.

In 1959, he was appointed a judge of the Trial Division of the Supreme Court of Alberta. From 1961 to 1974 he was Chief Justice of Alberta and the Northwest Territories Court of Appeal. He received an honorary doctorate from the University of Alberta in 1962.

In 1925 he married Doris Gertrude Charlesworth; they had two sons.
