= Supreme Court of the Northwest Territories =

The Supreme Court of the Northwest Territories is the name of two different superior courts for the Canadian territory of the Northwest Territories, which have existed at different times.

The first Supreme Court of the North-West Territories was created in 1885. At that time, the North-West Territories included the territory which later became the Provinces of Alberta and Saskatchewan, as well as the Yukon Territory. The first Supreme Court lasted until abolished for territorial purposes in 1905; it continued to act temporarily for the Provinces of Saskatchewan and Alberta until replaced in 1907 by separate courts for each province.

The current Supreme Court of the Northwest Territories was created in 1955 and continues to operate today.

Both courts had general jurisdiction over matters of both civil and criminal law. The first Court was both the trial court and the appellate court, but the current Court is primarily a trial court, with appeals going to the Alberta Court of Appeal, sitting as the Court of Appeal for the Northwest Territories.

== First Supreme Court (1885–1907) ==
=== Creation of the Court ===
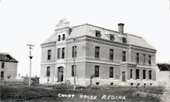
Regina Courthouse of the Supreme Court of the North-West Territories, 2002 Victoria Avenue, c.1919

The first Supreme Court of the North-West Territories was created by the federal Parliament in 1885 to replace the system of individual stipendiary magistrates which had previously operated in the Territories. The former stipendiary magistrates were appointed as the first judges of the new Supreme Court.

=== Jurisdiction and powers ===
The Court was a superior court of civil and criminal jurisdiction. The jurisdiction of the Court was defined by reference to the jurisdiction of the English courts which existed as of July 15, 1870, the date the North-West Territories became part of Canada. The Court had all the powers "... used, exercised and enjoyed by any of Her Majesty’s superior courts of common law, or by the Court of Chancery, or by the Court of Probate in England" as of that date. The judges of the Court sat individually as trial judges. The full court sat en banc to hear appeals. A further appeal lay to the Supreme Court of Canada under The Supreme Court Act.

The judges of the Supreme Court were initially non-voting members of the Legislative Council of the North-West Territories, to provide legal advice to the Council. They ceased to have this function when the Legislative Council was converted to a fully elected Legislative Assembly.

When the Yukon was created as a separate territory from the North-West Territories in 1898, the Supreme Court continued its jurisdiction over the territory as prescribed by the Yukon Act 1898.

=== Abolition of the Court ===
In 1905, Parliament created two new provinces, Alberta and Saskatchewan, from the southern portion of the North-West Territories. Parliament disestablished the Supreme Court in the Territories, and re-established a system of stipendiary magistrates for the North-West Territories However, as a transitional measure, the federal Acts establishing Alberta and Saskatchewan provided that the Court continued to dispense justice in the new provinces. The Supreme Court lasted for two more years, until the provincial Legislatures created the Supreme Court of Alberta and the Supreme Court of Saskatchewan in 1907. The provincial legislation creating these courts also abolished the Supreme Court of the North-West Territories. Half of the judges of the Supreme Court were appointed to the Supreme Court of Alberta, and the other judges were appointed to the Supreme Court of Saskatchewan.

=== Judges of the Court ===
The judges of the Court were appointed by the Governor General, on the advice of the federal Cabinet. There were originally three justices of the Court, but by the time of the abolition of the Court, it had grown to six justices: the Chief Justice and five puisne justices. The justices held office on good behaviour, but were removable by the Governor General, on address by the House of Commons and Senate of Canada.

- Hugh Richardson (1887–1903)
- Edward Ludlow Wetmore (1887–1907)
- David Lynch Scott (1894–1907)
- Horace Harvey (1904–1907)
- James Macleod
- James Prendergast
- Charles Rouleau (February 18, 1888 – August 25, 1901), Northern Alberta Judicial District

== Second Supreme Court (1955 to present) ==
=== Creation of the Court ===
In 1955, the federal Parliament re-created a superior court of record for the Northwest Territories, known originally as the Territorial Court. The Territorial Court initially consisted of one judge appointed by the Governor-in-Council. The judge held office during good behaviour, until age 75, but was removable by the Governor-in-Council on address of the House of Commons and Senate.

John Howard Sissons was the first judge of the second Supreme Court.

=== Current judges ===
The court currently consists of four judges residing in Yellowknife:

- Chief Justice Shannon Smallwood
- Justice K. L. Taylor
- Justice A. Piché
- Justice S. MacPherson

=== Past judges ===
- V.A. Schuler
- John Howard Sissons, appointed 1955
- William Morrow
- John Z. Vertes (1991 – July 1, 2011)
- T. David Marshall, appointed 1982

== See also ==
- Court of King's Bench of Alberta – originated from the Supreme Court of the Northwest Territories through the Supreme Court of Alberta in 1907
