= Court of Appeal of Alberta =

Canadian appellate court

- Established: 1921
- Jurisdiction: Alberta, Canada
- Location: Law Courts, Edmonton; Calgary Courts Centre, Calgary
- Authorized by: Judicature Act; Court of Appeal Act
- Number of positions: 14 (in addition to chief justice of Alberta, supernumerary judges, and the judges of the Court of King's Bench of Alberta, who are ex officio members of the Court of Appeal)
- Website: albertacourts.ca/court-of-appeal

Chief justice
- Currently: Dawn Pentelechuk (acting)

The Court of Appeal of Alberta (frequently referred to as Alberta Court of Appeal or ABCA) is a Canadian appellate court that serves as the highest appellate court in the jurisdiction of Alberta, subordinate to the Supreme Court of Canada.

== Jurisdiction and hierarchy within Canadian courts ==
The court is the highest in Alberta, Canada. It hears appeals from the Alberta Court of King's Bench, the Provincial Court of Alberta, and administrative boards and tribunals, as well as references from the Lieutenant Governor in Council (essentially the Alberta Cabinet). Some administrative appeals may bypass the Court of King's Bench, commonly orders made by professional discipline boards under the Medical Profession Act, the Legal Profession Act, but also under the Energy Resources Conservation Act.

Appeals from the Court of Appeal lie with the Supreme Court of Canada, Canada's court of last resort. Other than certain criminal matters, appeals to the Supreme Court of Canada are heard only by leave of that court. Since the Supreme Court denies leave in most cases, the Court of Appeal is the final court for most matters originating in Alberta.

Unlike the Court of King's Bench, the Court of Appeal has no inherent jurisdiction and therefore requires a statute to grant it the power to hear a matter before a panel is convened. As a court of a province, it is administered by the provincial government. Hearings are held exclusively in Edmonton's Law Courts and the Calgary Courts Centre. Unlike other provinces (except Newfoundland and Labrador and Ontario), the Alberta Court of Appeal displays a different coat of arms than its lower courts: the coat of arms of Canada.

== History ==
The court originated from the old Supreme Court of the Northwest Territories which was replaced by the Supreme Court of Alberta in 1907 (shortly after Alberta became a province in 1905). The new Supreme Court of Alberta comprised a trial division and an appellate division (essentially, brother justices of the Supreme Court sitting en banc with a quorum of three).

The second chief justice of Alberta, Horace Harvey, supported an independent appellate court designed only to hear appeals. The Judicature Act enacted these changes in 1919, and it was proclaimed in 1921. It was not until 1979 that the court changed its name to the "Court of Appeal of Alberta" through the Court of Appeal Act, at the same time that the Supreme Court Trial Division and the District Court were amalgamated and renamed the "Court of Queen's Bench of Alberta".

== Composition ==
There are 14 official positions on the bench including the chief justice of Alberta, who is the highest judicial officer in the province. At any given time there may be several additional judges who also sit as supernumerary justices. As a Section 96 court, the justices are appointed by the federal government and may hold office until the age of 75. Some of the justices have elected supernumerary (part-time or semi-retired) status. Occasionally, justices of the Court of King's Bench of Alberta sit on appeals. This is done at the request of a justice of the Court of Appeal. When this happens, these justices are sitting ex officio, but they have the same powers and duties as other justices of the Court of Appeal.

Most cases are heard by a panel of three justices, although the chief justice may convene a larger panel in exceptional circumstances. A single justice presides over matters heard in chambers, usually interlocutory matters or applications for leave to appeal.

== Association with the Northwest Territories ==
Justices of the Court of Appeal for the Northwest Territories are selected from the justices of the Court of Appeal of Alberta, Court of Appeal for Saskatchewan, and the judges and ex officio judges of the Supreme Court of the Northwest Territories. Hearings are held in Yellowknife, but may be heard anywhere in the territories or in Alberta.

== Current judges ==
Judges of the Court of Appeal of Alberta
| Name | Sitting in | Appointed | Nominated by | Position prior to appointment |
|---|---|---|---|---|
| Justice Frans F. Slatter | Edmonton | 2006 | Harper | Court of Queen's Bench of Alberta McCuaig Desrochers LLP |
| Justice Dawn Pentelechuk | Edmonton | 2018 | J. Trudeau | Court of Queen's Bench of Alberta |
| Justice Jolaine Antonio | Calgary | 2018 | J. Trudeau | Court of Queen's Bench of Alberta |
| Justice Kevin Feehan | Edmonton | 2019 | J. Trudeau | Court of Queen's Bench of Alberta |
| Justice Bernette Ho | Calgary | 2021 | J. Trudeau | Court of Queen's Bench of Alberta |
| Justice Anne Kirker | Calgary | 2021 | J. Trudeau | Court of Queen's Bench of Alberta |
| Justice William deWit | Calgary | 2023 | J. Trudeau | Court of King's Bench of Alberta |
| Justice Jane Fagnan | Edmonton | 2023 | J. Trudeau | Court of King's Bench of Alberta |
| Justice April Grosse | Calgary | 2023 | J. Trudeau | Court of King's Bench of Alberta |
| Justice Alice Woolley | Calgary | 2023 | J. Trudeau | Court of King's Bench of Alberta |
| Justice Kevin Feth | Edmonton | 2023 | J. Trudeau | Court of King's Bench of Alberta |
| Justice Tamara Friesen | Edmonton | 2024 | J. Trudeau | Court of King's Bench of Alberta |
| Justice Joshua Hawkes | Calgary | 2024 | J. Trudeau | Alberta Court of Justice |
| Justice Karan Shaner | Edmonton | 2024 | J. Trudeau | Supreme Court of the Northwest Territories |

Supernumerary judges of the Court of Appeal of Alberta
| Name | Stationed in | Appointed | Nominated by | Position prior to appointment |
|---|---|---|---|---|
| Justice Michelle Crighton (Supernumerary) | Edmonton | 2016 | J. Trudeau | Court of Queen's Bench of Alberta |
| Justice Jo'Anne Strekaf (Supernumerary) | Calgary | 2016 | J. Trudeau | Court of Queen's Bench of Alberta |

== Former chief justices of Alberta ==
- Arthur Lewis Sifton (1907–1910)
- Horace Harvey (1910–1921, 1924–1949)
- David Lynch Scott (1921–1924)
- George Bligh O'Connor (1950–1957)
- Clinton J. Ford (1957–1961)
- Sidney Bruce Smith (1961–1974)
- William A. McGillivray (1974–1984)
- James Herbert Laycraft (1984–1991)
- Catherine Fraser (1992–2022)
- Ritu Khullar (2022–2026)

== Previous judges ==
- Ronald Leon Berger (1996-2018)
- Sheilah L. Martin (2016–2017), elevated to the Supreme Court of Canada
- William Alexander Stevenson (1980–1990) elevated to the Supreme Court of Canada
- John Wesley McClung (1980–2004)
- Russell Brown (2014–2015) elevated to the Supreme Court of Canada
- Clifton D O'Brien (2005–2014)
- David C McDonald (1995 - 1996)
- Jean E.L. Côté (1987–2015)
- John "Jack" Major (1991–1992), elevated to the Supreme Court of Canada
- Anne Russell (1994–2006)
- (Asa) Milton "Milt" Harradence (1979–1997)
- Charles Allan Stuart (1907–1921 en banc appeals)(1921–1926)
- Allen Borislaw Zenoviy Sulatycky (1997–2000)
- William Robinson Howson (1942–1944)
- Charles Richmond Mitchell (1926–1936)
- Alexander Andrew MacGillivray (1931–1940)
- William Legh Walsh (1931–1931)
- Albert Freeman Ewing (1941–1946)
- James Duncan Hyndman ((1914–1921 en banc appeals)((1921–1928)
- Nicholas Dubois Dominic Beck (1907–1921 en banc appeals) (1921–1928)
- Alfred Henry Clarke (1921–1942)
- William Joseph Haddad (1974–1980)
- Neil C. Wittmann (1999–2004)
- Frank C. Ford (1936–1954)
- Harold Hayward Parlee (1945–1954)
- James Mitchell Cairns (1965–1977)
- Carole M. Conrad (1992–2014)
- John David Bracco (1987–19??)
- Roger Philip Kerans (1980–1997)
- Mary Margaret McCormick Hetherington (1985–2001)
- Willis O'Leary (1994–2006)
- Samuel Sereth Lieberman (1976–1997)
- Neil Douglas McDermid (1963–1986)
- James Boyd McBride (1957–1959)
- Hugh John MacDonald (1957–1960)
- René Paul Foisy (1987–1999)
- William George Morrow (1976–1979)
- Adelle Fruman (1998–2007)
- Horace Gilchrist Johnson (1954–1973)
- William Alexander MacDonald (1944–1957)
- Gordon Hollis Allen (1966–1978)
- Joseph John Walter Stratton (1987–1995)
- Arnold Fraser Moir (1973–1979)
- Carlton Ward Clement (1970–1982)
- Marshall Menzies Porter (1954–1969)
- Howard Lawrence Irving (1985–1999)
- Henry William Lunney (1928–1944)
- William Robert Sinclair (1973–1979)
- David Clifton Prowse (1972–1979)
- Roger Hector Belzil (1981–1996)
- E.W.S Kane (1961–1974)

== See also ==
- Judiciary
- Court System of Canada
