= Alberta Court of Justice =

Provincial court for the Canadian province of Alberta

Coordinates: 53°32′44″N 113°29′16″W

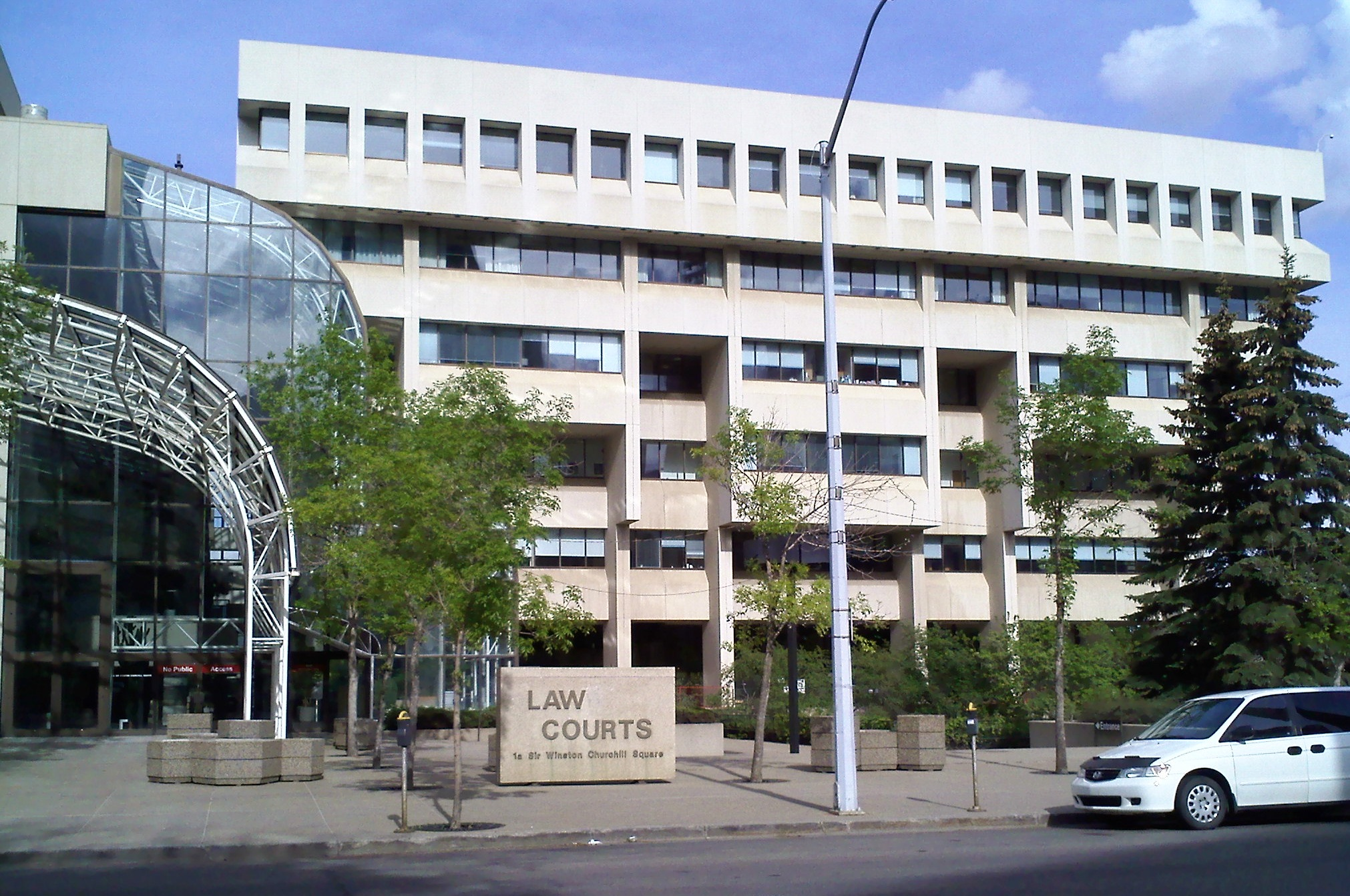
The Provincial Court of Alberta has courtrooms at more than 70 locations across the province including Edmonton's courthouse on Churchill Square.

The Alberta Court of Justice (formerly the Provincial Court of Alberta) is the provincial court for the Canadian province of Alberta. The Court oversees matters relating to criminal law, family law, youth law, civil law and traffic law. More than 170,000 matters come before the Court every year.

== Structure ==
Although Alberta’s provincial court system has been in operation for more than a century, originally known as the Provincial court of Alberta, it was established in 1978 by the Provincial Court Act. In August 2023, it was officially renamed the Alberta Court of Justice. This legislation combined the previous Magistrates Court, the Juvenile Court, the Small Claims Court, and the Family Court into one institution. The court is led by the Chief Justice of the Alberta Court of Justice, who is appointed by the provincial government to serve a seven-year term. There are more than 130 full-time Justices in the Alberta Court of Justice, working out of more than 70 locations across the province. The Alberta Court of Justice is an inferior court of first instance in Alberta, which means decisions from the Court of Justice may be appealed at the Court of King's Bench of Alberta and/or the Court of Appeal of Alberta. The Alberta Court of Justice hears the majority of criminal and civil cases in Alberta. All of Alberta’s criminal cases start in the Court of Justice, and 95 percent conclude there. Many traffic, regulatory and bylaw enforcement hearings take place at the Alberta Court of Justice. Most civil cases also take place in the Court of Justice, including cases involving landlord and tenant and claims involving less than $100,000. A majority of family law cases and child protection cases are also heard by the Court of Justice.

== Traffic Court ==
The Alberta Court of Justice's traffic division deals with offences pursuant to many provincial statutes and regulations, municipal bylaws and a few specified federal statutes. In spite of its name, Traffic Court is not limited to only hearing traffic-related offences. Trials in Traffic Court, whether involving an adult or a young person, are usually heard by a Justice of the Peace. However, in some situations or locations trials are heard by a Justice of the Court of Justice.

== Family Court ==
Justices in the Alberta Court of Justice's family division hear applications for child and spousal support, parenting arrangements, private guardianship and all child protection cases. The Alberta Court of Justice does not have jurisdiction to decide divorce applications or claims with respect to property rights arising from a breakdown of a relationship, and these matters consequently go to the Court of King’s Bench.

== Civil Court ==
The Civil Division of the Alberta Court of Justice provides a means to resolve private disputes, including landlord and tenant matters. The maximum amount that may be claimed in the Alberta Court of Justice's civil division is $100,000. If the claims exceed $100,000 or involve matters that cannot be heard in the Court of Justice, the claim must be filed in the Court of King’s Bench.

== Criminal Court ==
All criminal court appearances start in the Alberta Court of Justice. The Court of Justice Criminal Division handles first appearances, entry of pleas, bail hearings, preliminary inquiries, trials and sentencing of all prosecutions where the Crown proceeded by summary conviction and the majority of those where the proceedings were by indictment.

== See also ==
- Alberta Court of King's Bench
- Alberta Court of Appeal
