= Inherent jurisdiction =

Doctrine of the English common law

Inherent jurisdiction is a doctrine of the English common law that a superior court has the jurisdiction to hear any matter that comes before it, unless a statute or rule limits that authority or grants exclusive jurisdiction to some other court or tribunal. The term is also used when a governmental institution derives its jurisdiction from a fundamental governing instrument such as a constitution. In the English case of Bremer Vulkan Schiffbau und Maschinenfabrik v. South India Shipping Corporation Ltd, Lord Diplock described the court's inherent jurisdiction as a general power to control its own procedure so as to prevent its being used to achieve injustice.

Inherent jurisdiction appears to apply to an almost limitless set of circumstances. There are four general categories for use of the court's inherent jurisdiction:

1. to ensure convenience and fairness in legal proceedings;
2. to prevent steps being taken that would render judicial proceedings inefficacious;
3. to prevent abuses of process;
4. to act in aid of superior courts and in aid or control of inferior courts and tribunals.

As such, the exercise of inherent jurisdiction is a broad doctrine allowing a court to control its own processes and to control the procedures before it. The power stems not from any particular statute or legislation, but rather from inherent powers invested in a court to control the proceedings brought before it.

== Inherent jurisdiction in Canada ==
According to the case law in Canada, the key restriction on the application of inherent jurisdiction is that the doctrine cannot be used to override an existing statute or rule. The clearest articulation of such restriction is set out in the Supreme Court of Canada decision in College Housing Co-operative Ltd. v Baxter Student Housing Ltd. (1976) which was a case dealing with whether a judge had exceeded jurisdiction in determining the mortgagee should have priority over other charges and encumbrances. The Supreme Court of Canada stated that a court cannot negate the unambiguous expression of legislative will and further held that:

Inherent jurisdiction cannot, of course, be exercised so as to conflict with statute or rule. Moreover, because it is a special and extraordinary power, it should be exercised only sparingly and in a clear case.

Another restriction on the application of the doctrine of inherent jurisdiction appears to be that inherent jurisdiction cannot be used to create new rules of substantive law.

The rules of civil procedure in various provinces in Canada have varying relationships with the inherent jurisdiction of their courts. In Ontario the Rules of Civil Procedure are considered to be regulations of the Courts of Justice Act, and thus an expression of legislative will. They are created and amended by a "Civil Rules Committee" which consists of fourteen judges and thirteen other persons involved in the legal community including the Attorney General or his representative. The rules are subject to the approval of the Lieutenant Governor in Council. The judges of the Court obviously have a part in the making of the rules, but the rules are regulations under the Act. Inherent jurisdiction cannot be used to conflict with the unambiguous expression of the Rules.

In Nova Scotia, on the other hand, the Rules of Civil Procedure are made by the judges of the Superior Court and the Court of Appeal pursuant to s.46 of the Judicature Act. The Attorney General does not have a hand in their creation, and they are not subject to approval by the Lieutenant Governor in Council. The Court of Appeal for Nova Scotia has taken the position that a single judge of the court may use the inherent jurisdiction of the court to manage its own procedures.

== See also ==
- Court system of Canada
- Courts of England and Wales
