= Court of King's Bench of Alberta =

Superior court of Alberta, Canada

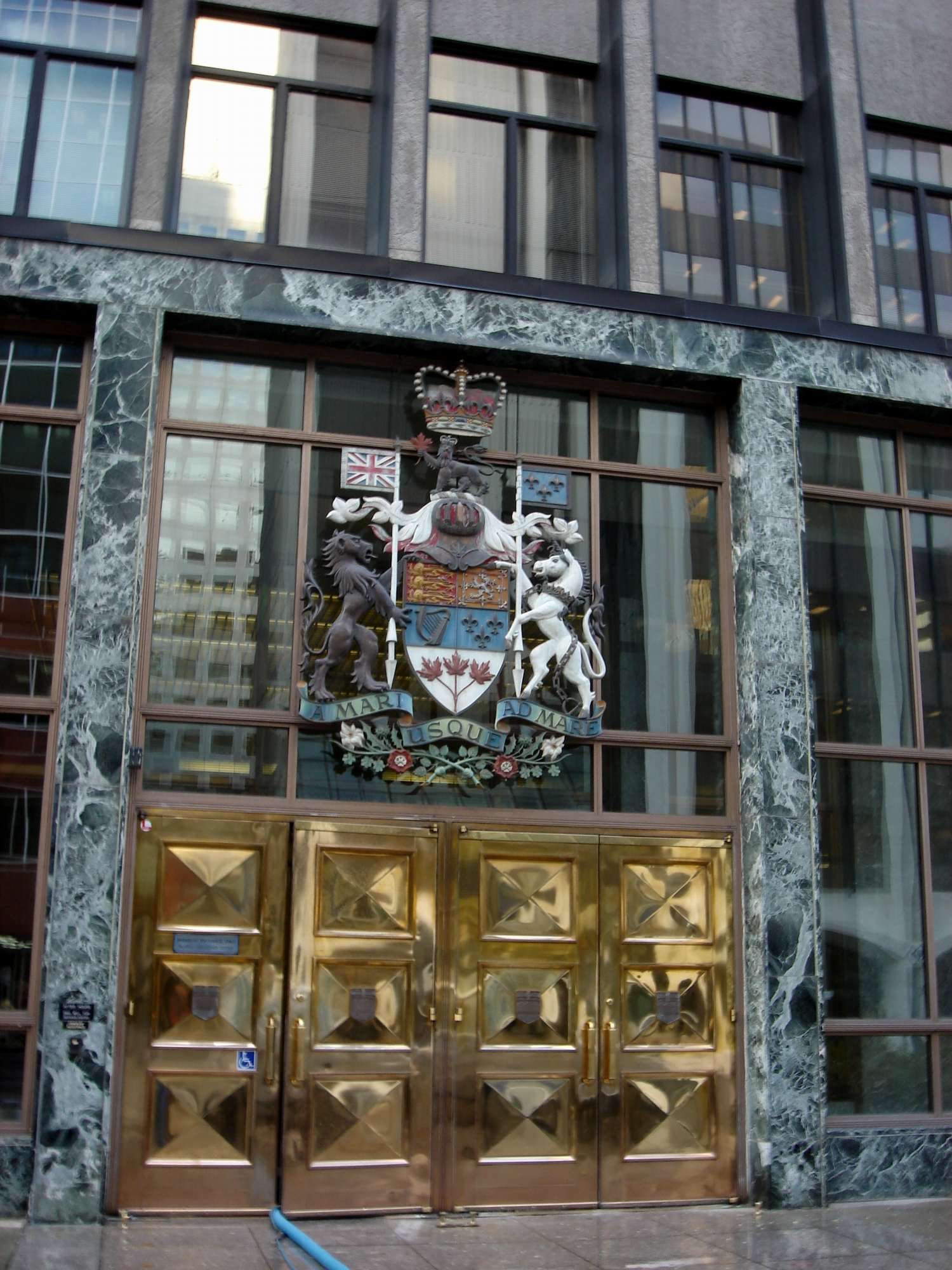
- Entrance of the Queen's Bench of Alberta building in Calgary (demolished 2007)
- Location: Calgary
- Website: albertacourts.ca/kb

Chief Justice
- Currently: Kent H. Davidson
- Since: June 23, 2024

Associate Chief Justice
- Currently: D. Blair Nixon
- Since: October 6, 2023

Associate Chief Justice
- Currently: Kenneth G. Nielsen
- Since: May 22, 2019

The Court of King's Bench of Alberta (abbreviated in citations as ABKB or Alta. K.B., named Queen's Bench if the monarch is female) is the superior trial court of the Canadian province of Alberta.

The Court was relocated to the Calgary Courts Centre in 2007, and has been located at the Law Courts building in Edmonton since the 1970s.

== History ==
The court originates from the old Supreme Court of the Northwest Territories, which continued to exist in Alberta and Saskatchewan after those two provinces were created in 1905. In 1907, Alberta abolished the territorial Supreme as it existed in Alberta, and created the Supreme Court of Alberta. The new provincial Supreme Court inherited much of the jurisdiction of the territorial Supreme Court. Some jurisdiction of the territorial court was assigned to several lower district courts created at the same time as the new provincial Supreme Court.

In 1921, the Supreme Court was reorganized to have an independent trial division (Supreme Court of Alberta Trial Division), and an independent appellate division (Supreme Court of Alberta Appellate Division), the precursor to the Court of Appeal of Alberta. On June 30, 1979, the Supreme Court Trial Division was renamed the "Court of Queen's Bench of Alberta".

The district courts created in 1907 were amalgamated into the District Court of Northern Alberta and the District Court of Southern Alberta in 1935, merging altogether into the District Court of Alberta in 1975. In 1979, it merged for the last time, this time back with the Supreme Court, into the Court of Queen's Bench.

== Structure ==
The court consists of a chief justice of the court, two associate chief justices (one in Edmonton and one in Calgary), and several judges including those judges who have elected supernumerary status after many years of service and after having attained eligibility for retirement (typically at age 65).

A justice of the Court of Appeal of Alberta is an ex officio justice of the Court of King's Bench and may sit on that court. Likewise, a justice of the Court of King's Bench may sit on a panel of the Court of Appeal, by invitation of the chief justice of Alberta. The chief justice of Alberta and the chief justice of the Court of the King's Bench are distinct offices. The former is the chief justice of the province and sits on the Court of Appeal, while the latter is the chief justice of a court and sits on the Court of King's Bench.

The province is divided into 11 districts with court sitting in 13 different locations (some districts have a primary and a secondary location). As of 2010 the locations were:

- Calgary
- Drumheller
- Edmonton
- Fort McMurray
- Grande Prairie
- High Level
- Hinton
- Lethbridge
- Medicine Hat
- Peace River
- Red Deer
- St. Paul
- Wetaskiwin

== Jurisdiction ==
As a superior court, it has inherent jurisdiction and therefore, may hear matters despite absence of specific statutory delegation. Thus, it operates as a civil and criminal trial court, hears surrogate matters, as well as certain appeals from the Alberta Court of Justice.

Appeals from the court lie with the Court of Appeal. Civil procedure before the court are set out in the Alberta Rules of Court.

== Appointments ==
Although provincial superior courts are administered by the provinces, they are considered to be Section 96 courts (from Section 96 of the Constitution Act, 1867). Therefore, appointments to the court are within federal jurisdiction and made by Cabinet.

== Styling ==
The Court of Queen's Bench Act sets out the styling convention of the court in Section 2.1. During the reign of a queen, it is known as the Court of Queen's Bench of Alberta. On September 8, 2022, upon the accession of King Charles III to the throne, the name changed to the Court of King's Bench of Alberta.

== Former justices of the court ==
- Joe Kryczka (1980 to 1991)
- Joanne B Veit (1981 to 2017)
- Sheila J. Greckol (2001 to 2016)
- Sheilah Martin (2005 to 2016)
- Ritu Khullar (2017 to 2018)
- J Richard Philippe Marceau (1995 - ?)
- N.C. Wittmann
- René Paul Foisy (? - 1987)
- Vernor Winfield MacBriare Smith

=== Former chief justices of the court ===
- Mary T. Moreau (October 12, 2017 - November 6, 2023)
- Allan H.J. Wachowich (2001-2009)
- Neil Wittmann
- W. Kenneth Moore
- William R. Howson
- Thomas Tweedie (1944-1944)

== See also ==
- Applications judges: Judicial officers part of the Court of King's Bench, appointed by the province
