= List of lieutenant governors of Alberta =

The following is a list of the lieutenant governors of Alberta. Though the present-day office of lieutenant governor in Alberta came into being only upon the province's entry into Canadian Confederation in 1905, the post is a continuation from the first governorship of the Northwest Territories in 1869.

== List ==
No.	Portrait	Name (Birth–Death)	Term of office		Monarch Reign	Premier Tenure
No.	Portrait	Name (Birth–Death)	Took office	Left office	Monarch Reign	Premier Tenure
1		George H. V. Bulyea (1859–1928)	1 September 1905	20 October 1915	Edward VII (1901–1910)	Alexander Cameron Rutherford (1905–1910)
1		George H. V. Bulyea (1859–1928)	1 September 1905	20 October 1915	George V (1910–1936)	Alexander Cameron Rutherford (1905–1910)
1		George H. V. Bulyea (1859–1928)	1 September 1905	20 October 1915	George V (1910–1936)	Arthur Sifton (1910–1917)
2		Robert Brett (1851–1929)	20 October 1915	29 October 1925	George V (1910–1936)	Arthur Sifton (1910–1917)
2		Robert Brett (1851–1929)	20 October 1915	29 October 1925	George V (1910–1936)	Charles Stewart (1917–1921)
2		Robert Brett (1851–1929)	20 October 1915	29 October 1925	George V (1910–1936)	Herbert Greenfield (1921–1925)
3		William Egbert (1857–1936)	29 October 1925	5 May 1931	George V (1910–1936)	Herbert Greenfield (1921–1925)
3		William Egbert (1857–1936)	29 October 1925	5 May 1931	George V (1910–1936)	John Edward Brownlee (1925–1934)
4		William L. Walsh (1857–1938)	5 May 1931	1 October 1936	George V (1910–1936)	John Edward Brownlee (1925–1934)
4		William L. Walsh (1857–1938)	5 May 1931	1 October 1936	George V (1910–1936)	Richard Gavin Reid (1934–1935)
4		William L. Walsh (1857–1938)	5 May 1931	1 October 1936	George V (1910–1936)	William Aberhart (1935–1943)
4		William L. Walsh (1857–1938)	5 May 1931	1 October 1936	Edward VIII (1936)	William Aberhart (1935–1943)
5		Philip Primrose (1864–1937)	1 October 1936	17 March 1937	Edward VIII (1936)	William Aberhart (1935–1943)
5		Philip Primrose (1864–1937)	1 October 1936	17 March 1937	George VI (1936–1952)	William Aberhart (1935–1943)
6		John C. Bowen (1872–1957)	23 March 1937	1 February 1950	George VI (1936–1952)	William Aberhart (1935–1943)
6		John C. Bowen (1872–1957)	23 March 1937	1 February 1950	George VI (1936–1952)	Ernest Manning (1943–1968)
7		John J. Bowlen (1876–1959)	1 February 1950	16 December 1959	George VI (1936–1952)	Ernest Manning (1943–1968)
7		John J. Bowlen (1876–1959)	1 February 1950	16 December 1959	Elizabeth II (1952–2022)	Ernest Manning (1943–1968)
8		John Percy Page (1887–1973)	19 December 1959	26 January 1966	Elizabeth II (1952–2022)	Ernest Manning (1943–1968)
9		Grant MacEwan (1902–2000)	26 January 1966	2 July 1974	Elizabeth II (1952–2022)	Ernest Manning (1943–1968)
9		Grant MacEwan (1902–2000)	26 January 1966	2 July 1974	Elizabeth II (1952–2022)	Harry Strom (1968–1971)
9		Grant MacEwan (1902–2000)	26 January 1966	2 July 1974	Elizabeth II (1952–2022)	Peter Lougheed (1971–1985)
10		Ralph Steinhauer (1905–1987)	2 July 1974	18 October 1979	Elizabeth II (1952–2022)	Peter Lougheed (1971–1985)
11		Frank C. Lynch-Staunton (1905–1990)	18 October 1979	22 January 1985	Elizabeth II (1952–2022)	Peter Lougheed (1971–1985)
12		Helen Hunley (1920–2010)	22 January 1985	11 March 1991	Elizabeth II (1952–2022)	Peter Lougheed (1971–1985)
12		Helen Hunley (1920–2010)	22 January 1985	11 March 1991	Elizabeth II (1952–2022)	Don Getty (1985–1992)
13		Gordon Towers (1919–1999)	11 March 1991	17 April 1996	Elizabeth II (1952–2022)	Don Getty (1985–1992)
13		Gordon Towers (1919–1999)	11 March 1991	17 April 1996	Elizabeth II (1952–2022)	Ralph Klein (1992–2006)
14		Bud Olson (1925–2002)	17 April 1996	10 February 2000	Elizabeth II (1952–2022)	Ralph Klein (1992–2006)
15		Lois Hole (1929–2005)	10 February 2000	6 January 2005	Elizabeth II (1952–2022)	Ralph Klein (1992–2006)
16		Norman Kwong (1929–2016)	20 January 2005	11 May 2010	Elizabeth II (1952–2022)	Ralph Klein (1992–2006)
16		Norman Kwong (1929–2016)	20 January 2005	11 May 2010	Elizabeth II (1952–2022)	Ed Stelmach (2006–2011)
17		Donald Ethell (born 1937)	11 May 2010	12 June 2015	Elizabeth II (1952–2022)	Ed Stelmach (2006–2011)
17		Donald Ethell (born 1937)	11 May 2010	12 June 2015	Elizabeth II (1952–2022)	Alison Redford (2011–2014)
17		Donald Ethell (born 1937)	11 May 2010	12 June 2015	Elizabeth II (1952–2022)	Dave Hancock (2014)
17		Donald Ethell (born 1937)	11 May 2010	12 June 2015	Elizabeth II (1952–2022)	Jim Prentice (2014–2015)
17		Donald Ethell (born 1937)	11 May 2010	12 June 2015	Elizabeth II (1952–2022)	Rachel Notley (2015–2019)
18		Lois Mitchell (born 1939)	12 June 2015	26 August 2020	Elizabeth II (1952–2022)	Rachel Notley (2015–2019)
18		Lois Mitchell (born 1939)	12 June 2015	26 August 2020	Elizabeth II (1952–2022)	Jason Kenney (2019–2022)
19		Salma Lakhani (born 1951 or 1952)	26 August 2020	Incumbent	Elizabeth II (1952–2022)	Jason Kenney (2019–2022)
19		Salma Lakhani (born 1951 or 1952)	26 August 2020	Incumbent	Charles III (since 2022)	Jason Kenney (2019–2022)
19		Salma Lakhani (born 1951 or 1952)	26 August 2020	Incumbent	Charles III (since 2022)	Danielle Smith (since 2022)

== See also ==
- Office-holders of Canada
- Canadian incumbents by year

Order of precedence
Preceded by Catherine Fraser, The Chief Justice of The Court of Appeal of Alberta	Order of precedence in Alberta as of 2013	Succeeded by Former Premiers of Alberta
