= Philip Primrose =

Canadian police officer and magistrate (1864–1937)

The Honourable Philip Primrose
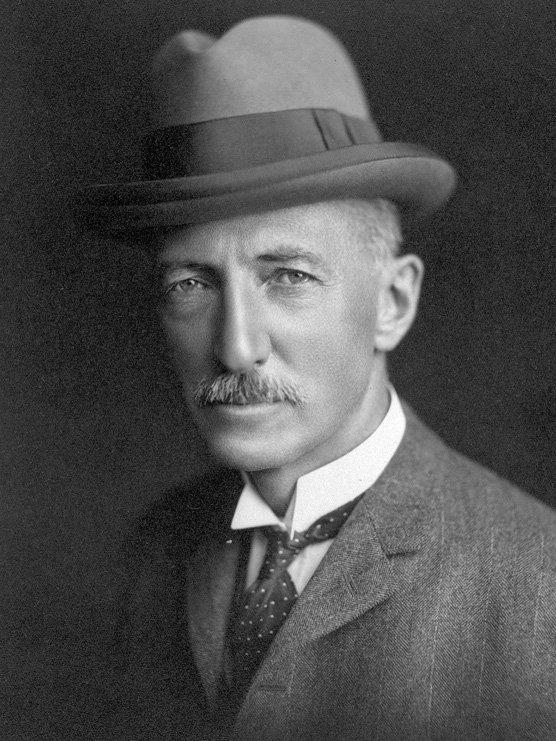

5th Lieutenant Governor of Alberta
- In office October 1, 1936 – March 17, 1937
- Monarchs: Edward VIII; George VI
- Governor General: The Lord Tweedsmuir
- Premier: William Aberhart
- Preceded by: William L. Walsh
- Succeeded by: John C. Bowen

Personal details
- Born: Philip Carteret Hill Primrose; October 23, 1864 Halifax, Nova Scotia
- Died: March 17, 1937 (aged 72) Edmonton, Alberta, Canada
- Party: Liberal
- Spouse: Lily Deane (m. 1902)
- Relations: 5th Earl of Rosebery; cousin Clarence Primrose; cousin
- Children: Phyllis (1902–1975); Neil (1904–1904); Neil Philip (1905–1991); Sybil (c. 1909–1946)
- Education: Royal Military College of Canada
- Occupation: Police officer

Philip Carteret Hill Primrose (October 23, 1864 – March 17, 1937) was a Canadian police officer and the fifth Lieutenant Governor of Alberta.

Primrose was born in 1864 in Nova Scotia. He attended the Pictou Academy before graduating from the Royal Military College in 1885. Upon his graduation, he took up employment with the North-West Mounted Police (NWMP) (later merged into the Royal Canadian Mounted Police). Over the 30 years he spent with the NWMP, he was stationed at many locations throughout the North-West Territories, serving as Superintendent on four separate occasions before his retirement from the force in 1915.

Primrose then moved to Edmonton and accepted the position of city police magistrate, a position he would hold for 20 years. Amongst other positions, during World War I he commanded the Edmonton Reserve Battalion of the Canadian Army. Although he had never actively participated in politics, in 1936 Primrose was appointed Lieutenant Governor of Alberta, a position he held for only 167 days before he died after a long illness.

== Early life, education and career ==
Primrose was born in 1864 in Halifax, Nova Scotia, the second of three children of Alexander and Elizabeth Catherine Rebecca Primrose (née Daly). He was named after a good friend of his father, Philip Carteret Hill. His father Alexander came to Nova Scotia from Rothiemay, Scotland and settled in the Pictou area around 1815. He was a barrister and served a term on the Halifax City Council from 1853–1855. He was a distant cousin to the Earls of Rosebery, including the 5th Earl, who was Prime Minister of the United Kingdom from 1894–1895, A cousin, Clarence Primrose served in the Senate of Canada from 1892 until his death in 1902. He was a descendant of the United Empire Loyalists.

After graduating from the Pictou Academy in 1881, Primrose was accepted into the Royal Military College, from which he graduated in 1885. He remained in Canada after graduation, rejecting the option of accepting a commission in the British Army. Primrose was appointed an Inspector of the North-West Mounted Police on August 1, 1885, and was sworn in on August 31 of the same year.

== Police career ==
=== North-West Mounted Police ===
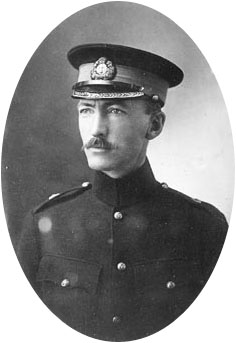
Primrose as police magistrate in 1914.

During his 13 years as Inspector, Primrose was posted to many locations in the North-West Territories, including Wood Mountain in the District of Assiniboia (today in Saskatchewan), Fort Macleod, and Calgary (today, both in Alberta). In addition to serving as a "Mountie", he served as Justice of the Peace while stationed at Macleod. In 1898, at the outbreak of the Klondike Gold Rush, Primrose was assigned to the Yukon, where he was stationed at the H Division in Tagish. He became superintendent of that division in October 1899, then was transferred to become superintendent of the B Division one month later. In 1901, he was posted to Dawson, where he assumed responsibility for 43 Mounted Policemen and 4 other men at the Whitehorse station. During his time in the Yukon, the main role of the police was guarding people awaiting trials and prisoners serving sentences.

Primrose supervised the 1900 Yukon census, reporting to the Commissioner that the territory's population was 16,463. On May 13, 1900, he fined 31 "members of the sporting fraternity" $55 each, boosting the territorial treasury. Other activities included more community-oriented tasks, such as firefighting when permitted. During his time in Dawson, he befriended a lawyer currently practicing in the area, William L. Walsh. Walsh would be his predecessor to the office of Lieutenant Governor of Alberta. Primrose's assignment to the Yukon ended in 1902.

After returning from the Yukon, he assumed command of the A Division of the NWMP in Maple Creek (today in Saskatchewan). After two months at Maple Creek, he took over the NWMP Macleod Department (today in Alberta) as Superintendent, serving there until 1913. He became a prominent landowner during his time in Macleod, owning several lots in town, as well as a section outside. He was appointed a commissioner of police in the new province of Alberta in November 1911. In 1913, he was posted to the NWMP Headquarters in Regina to assist in the organization of the Criminal Investigation Branch. In August he was granted a leave of absence when he went to the Mayo Clinic at Rochester to undergo surgery to repair an undisclosed rupture and remove his appendix. After returning to Regina in 1914, he retired at the rank of Superintendent on April 5, 1915.

=== Magistrate ===
Following his retirement from the NWMP, Primrose was offered the position of a police magistrate in Edmonton. Primrose accepted, as he had always wanted to retire in the city. In 1917, he was chairman of the three-person Alberta Provincial Police board of commissioners, where he was tasked with supervising the new force. Before his retirement as magistrate in July 1935, it had been estimated that he had dealt with over 40,000 cases.

During World War I, Primrose was the commanding officer of the Edmonton Reserve Battalion of the Canadian Army, with the rank of Lieutenant-Colonel. He was president of the Royal Northwest Mounted Police Veterans' Association in 1922; he lobbied hard for adequate pensions for veterans.

== Lieutenant Governor of Alberta ==
Although a Liberal by family heritage and disposition, Primrose never sought public office, or ever actively participated in politics. On September 10, 1936, on the advice of Prime Minister William Lyon Mackenzie King, Primrose was appointed to the office of Lieutenant Governor of Alberta by Governor General John Buchan, succeeding William L. Walsh, his old friend. He was sworn in on October 1, 1936. During his time as Lieutenant-Governor, Primrose and his wife resided in Government House, however, during this time, he was plagued by illness, therefore making him essentially unable to fulfill his duties of office, remaining in medical care from October 19, 1937 until his death. Most of his duties were carried out by his wife, Lily, who hosted the 1937 New Year's Day reception at Government House, and served as an honorary officer of the Royal Alexandra Hospital Women's Auxiliary. Public functions were also attended by others family members, assisting in the absence of Primrose. On February 25, 1937, the Speech from the Throne was read by Horace Harvey, Chief Justice of the Supreme Court of Alberta, due to Primrose's illness.

== Personal life ==
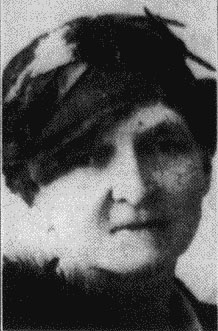
Mrs. Lily Primrose in a 1936 article.

On January 8, 1902, Philip Primrose married Lily Deane (June 3, 1877 – March 15, 1966). She was the daughter of Superintendent Richard Burton Deane of the North-West Mounted Police. Deane had served with the NWMP during the Riel Rebellion of 1885, tasked with guarding Riel and 50 other participants of the uprising in their prison cells. The Primroses had four children: Phyllis Jessie (1902–1975), Neil (1904–1904), Neil Philip (1905–1991), and Sybil E. (c. 1909–1946). His oldest son, Neil Philip was a lawyer, practicing in Vegreville and Edmonton. After being created a King's Counsel in 1951, Neil served as a Judge with the Supreme Court of Alberta in its Trial Division. One of his grandchildren, John Nairn Primrose won trap shooting championships at the Commonwealth Games in 1974 and 1978 respectively, as well as going on to win two world championships, and, in 1981, was appointed as a Member of the Order of Canada.

Primrose Lake was named after him in 1900, while he was Inspector in charge of the Tagish branch of the NWMP. In 1927, Primrose was made a life member of the Army, Navy, and Veterans' Association in Edmonton. He received the RCMP Long Service Medal in 1935. In 1970, a subdivision in Edmonton was named in his honour. Philip Primrose was a member of the Presbyterian Church in Canada.

== Death and state funeral ==
Philip C. H. Primrose died on March 17, 1937, in Edmonton, while still occupying the office of Lieutenant Governor, a post he had held for only 167 days. He was the first Lieutenant Governor of Alberta to die in office. He had suffered a heart attack, with pre-existing complications from a long, undisclosed illness. On March 19, 1937, he lay in state for two hours in the main chamber of the Legislative Assembly of Alberta in what was described as one of the "most impressive ceremonies ever beheld in Edmonton." His coffin, draped with the Union Flag lay on a table in the chamber in front of the speaker's rostrum, guarded by four Royal Canadian Mounted Police constables; members' desks were draped in purple velvet. At his request, Primrose was dressed in the uniform of a NWMP Inspector.

After lying in state for two hours, his body was taken back to the funeral home, and was taken to Government House the next morning, from where it was brought to the church that afternoon. His state funeral, the first ever in Alberta, was held in Edmonton's First Presbyterian Church. It was attended by many prominent provincial-level politicians, including Premier William Aberhart, Chief Justices Horace Harvey and Charles Richmond Mitchell, University of Alberta president William A. R. Kerr, Attorney General of Alberta John Hugill, Mayor of Edmonton Joseph Clarke, and Assistant RCMP Commissioner Colonel Henry M. Newson. He was interred at the RNWMP plot at the Edmonton Cemetery. The state funeral was said to have "set the precedent for others in the future." John C. Bowen was sworn in as Primrose's successor to Lieutenant Governor on March 23, 1937.

== Legacy ==
Primrose was described as "one of the most colourful, interesting and forceful characters in Edmonton's civic life for may years." His NWMP command was described as a "model to the Force", while his police career had been described to have "won the confidence and respect of the public to an exceptional degree." Donald E. Cameron, who delivered the eulogy at the funeral remarked of Primrose, "Colonel Primrose never sought for himself or for his men more than that their record of service should be allowed to speak for itself. Somewhat austerely he clung to the tradition of the service that duty faithfully discharged its own reward." An obituary published shortly after his death described him as "courageous, outspoken and firm in dealing with his criminals." John W. McDonald, Mayor of Macleod also stated, "Col. Primrose was one of the outstanding officers of the force. … He was a good citizen and a good police officer and a man of many admirable qualities." On January 12, 1970, the Primrose subdivision in Edmonton, Alberta, North of Whitemud Drive to 100 Avenue, west of 178 Street to RDA was named in his honour, although most of this area is now better known as West Edmonton Mall.

== Bibliography ==
- Perry, Sandra E.; Powell, Karen L. (2006). On Behalf of the Crown : Lieutenant Governors of the North-West Territories and Alberta, 1869-2005. Edmonton, Alberta: Legislative Assembly of Alberta. ISBN 0-9689217-4-4.
- Marble, Allan Everett (1977). Nova Scotians at home and abroad: biographical sketches of over six hundred native born Nova Scotians. Windsor, Nova Scotia: Lancelot Press. ISBN 0-88999-074-3.
- Munro, Kenneth (2004). First Presbyterian Church, Edmonton: A History. Victoria, British Columbia: Trafford Publishing. ISBN 0-88999-074-3.
