= Frank C. Lynch-Staunton =

Canadian politician

The Honourable Frank Lynch-Staunton AOE

11th Lieutenant Governor of Alberta
- In office October 18, 1979 – January 22, 1985
- Monarch: Elizabeth II
- Governors General: Edward Schreyer; Jeanne Sauvé
- Premier: Peter Lougheed
- Preceded by: Ralph Steinhauer
- Succeeded by: Helen Hunley

Personal details
- Born: Francis Charles Lynch-Staunton; March 8, 1905 Pincher Creek, District of Alberta, North-West Territories
- Died: September 25, 1990 (aged 85) Edmonton, Alberta, Canada
- Spouse(s): Monica Adam (m. 1929) Muriel B. Shaw (m. 1983)
- Children: Betty Lowe, Marina Field, and Hugh
- Education: University of Alberta
- Occupation: Rancher
- Profession: Politician

Francis Charles "Frank" Lynch-Staunton AOE (March 8, 1905 – September 25, 1990) was the 11th lieutenant governor of Alberta from 1979 to 1985.

== Early life ==
Born in Pincher Creek, then part of the North-West Territories' District of Alberta, Frank Lynch-Staunton was the son of Richard Lynch-Staunton and Isabelle Mary Wilson. He attended Western Canadian College in Calgary from 1919 to 1922. He worked a summer as a cowboy at the Antelope Butte Ranch, owned by his family. From 1923 to 1927, he studied engineering at the University of Alberta.

In spring 1927, Lynch-Staunton secured employment surveying in the Lethbridge area. One survey and inspection project that he worked on was the Canadian Pacific Railway's Lethbridge Viaduct. After two months of surveying, he was employed as a geological surveyor for Imperial Oil for two years before entering into a ranching partnership with his father in 1929. Lynch-Staunton was a founding member and director of Community Auction Sales, the first sales organization in Canada to sell cattle by auction.

In 1929, Frank married Monica Adam. They had three children together: Betty Lowe, Marina Field, and Hugh.

In 1933, he joined "A" Squadron, South Alberta Horse, at Pincher Creek, serving as a second lieutenant. He continued to serve with the Canadian Militia until he retired in 1943 with the rank of major.

Lynch-Staunton was a councillor for Municipal District No. 9, Pincher Creek, and he served on the Senate of the University of Lethbridge, the Canada Council, and the boards of the Claresholm Auxiliary Hospital, the Glenbow Foundation, and Alberta Government House.

In 1963 he was Progressive Conservative candidate in Pincher Creek-Crowsnest provincial constituency. he came in second behind the Social Credit candidate. He once revealed he occasionally voted Liberal when he liked the candidate.

== Lieutenant governor of Alberta ==
On the advice of Prime Minister Joe Clark, Frank C. Lynch-Staunton was appointed lieutenant governor of Alberta on October 18, 1979. As lieutenant governor, Lynch-Staunton gave royal assent to an act in November 1979 which established the Alberta Order of Excellence, an award given to current or former long-time residents of Alberta who have "rendered service of the greatest distinction and of singular excellence for or on behalf of the residents of Alberta" in any field. Only 10 people can be inducted every year.

His term as lieutenant governor was completed on October 18, 1984, but he was asked to continue in office until his successor was sworn in effective January 22, 1985.

== Later life ==
After the death of his first wife, Monica Adam, in 1976, Lynch-Staunton married Muriel B. Shaw in 1983.

He published his autobiography, Greener Pastures: The Memoirs of F. Lynch-Staunton, in 1987.

Lynch-Staunton received honorary doctor of laws degrees from the University of Alberta in 1980, and the University of Lethbridge in 1983. He was a Knight of Grace of the Most Venerable Order of the Hospital of St. John of Jerusalem (1979), an honorary chief ("Mountain") of the Blood Indians, an honorary member of the Corps of Engineers, and an honorary member of the Edmonton Consular Corps.

Lynch-Staunton died in Edmonton after suffering a stroke in 1990, aged 85. He is buried in the St. George's Cemetery at Livingstone, located 10 kms north of Lundbreck, Alberta.

== Bibliography ==
- Perry, Sandra E.; Powell, Karen L. (2006). On Behalf of the Crown : Lieutenant Governors of the North-West Territories and Alberta, 1869-2005. Edmonton, Alberta: Legislative Assembly of Alberta. ISBN 0-9689217-4-4.
