= William Egbert =

Canadian politician (1857–1936)

The Honourable William Egbert KC
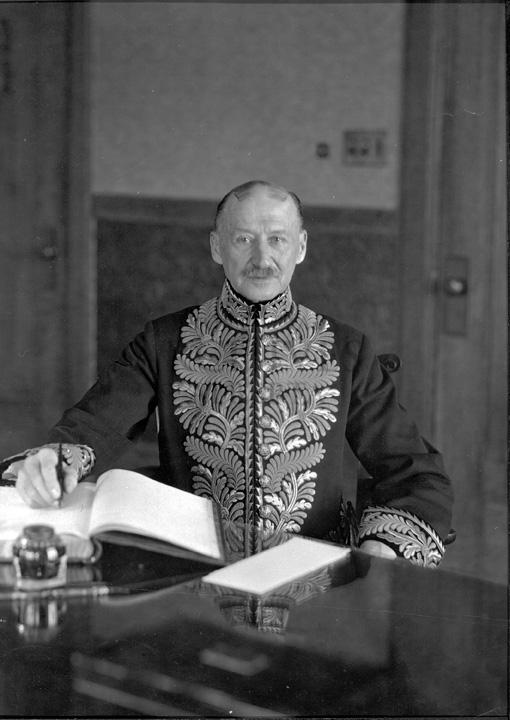
- Egbert as Lieutenant Governor

3rd Lieutenant Governor of Alberta
- In office October 29, 1925 – May 5, 1931
- Monarch: George V
- Governors General: The Lord Byng of Vimy; The Viscount Willingdon; The Earl of Bessborough
- Premier: Herbert Greenfield; John Edward Brownlee
- Preceded by: Robert Brett
- Succeeded by: William L. Walsh

Personal details
- Born: February 25, 1857 Welland County, Province of Canada
- Died: October 15, 1936 (aged 79) Calgary, Alberta, Canada
- Party: Liberal
- Spouse: Eva Catherine Miller (m. 1884)
- Children: 2
- Education: University of Toronto; Victoria University
- Occupation: Physician, politician

William Egbert KC (February 25, 1857 – October 15, 1936) was a Canadian physician and politician. He was the third lieutenant governor of Alberta, from 1925 to 1931.

Egbert was born in 1857 to a farming family in what is today the province of Ontario. He attended Ottawa Normal School, then taught and was a principal at Ontario schools. After receiving his medical degrees, he began to practice in Milverton, Ontario. In 1904, he moved to Calgary, and involved himself in politics and community affairs as Alberta entered Confederation.

Egbert was an unsuccessful legislative candidate for the Liberal Party of Alberta in the 1905 general election. In 1925, the Liberal prime minister, William Lyon Mackenzie King, arranged for Egbert's appointment as lieutenant governor. Egbert served six years in that post, and participated in a variety of activities, from welcoming the Prince of Wales to hosting students at the University of Alberta. In 1931, he left his position as lieutenant governor and returned to the practice of medicine. He died in 1936 after a long illness.

== Early life and education ==
William Egbert was born on February 25, 1857, in Welland County, Province of Canada (now Ontario) to Maria Catherine (née Silverthorn) and Joseph Morgan Egbert. His father owned a farm near Dunnville.

Egbert attended the Dunnville Public High School, and graduated from Ottawa Normal School in 1881, with a teaching certificate. He taught at Moote School in Canborough, and was a principal at the Dunnville Public School. In 1885, he studied medicine at Victoria University. He received his Bachelor of Medicine, Doctor of Medicine and Master of Surgery degrees in 1889. He then attended post-graduate education the next year in Edinburgh and London.

== Early career ==
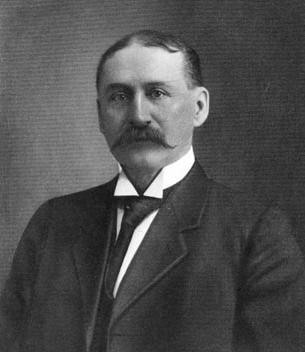
Egbert in his younger years.

When returning to Ontario in 1891, Egbert established a medical practice in Milverton. He was described as "one of the best known physicians and surgeons in the Eastern provinces, his surgical training winning fame for him." In the early 1890s, Egbert played a key role in establishing a rural telephone service in his area. He also held many community positions, such as the choir leader at a local Methodist church, and as a member of the local school board. After more than a decade of practice, Egbert spent one year in New York City, doing more post-graduate courses.

After being impressed with the Canadian West on a trip there, Egbert and his family moved to Calgary, where he established a medical practice in 1904. He registered as a medical practitioner in the North-West Territories in the same year and again in 1906 after the province of Alberta entered Confederation. In addition to his medical practices, he was an active community member, serving as a member of the Calgary Board of Health, Tubercular Hospital Site Committee, Calgary Board of Trade and the Alberta Medical Association, where he was president in 1921. He also established the Columbia Hospital, and was its director.

== Politics ==
Egbert was the unsuccessful Liberal candidate for the legislative district of Calgary for the Legislative Assembly of Alberta in the 1909 general election. In the same year, he was elected to the Calgary City Council, on which he served two terms (1909–1911). He was the acting Mayor of Calgary for a month in 1911 in the absence of Mayor John William Mitchell, and was a candidate for the position in December, but was unsuccessful. He also was president from 1917 to 1925 of the Alberta Federal Liberal Association.

=== Lieutenant Governor of Alberta ===
Egbert was appointed the Lieutenant Governor of Alberta on October 20, 1925, by Governor General Julian Byng, 1st Viscount Byng of Vimy, on advice of William Lyon Mackenzie King. He was sworn in on October 29 in a simple ceremony in Calgary, the only swearing-in of a lieutenant governor that has not taken place in the capital city, Edmonton. During his tenure as lieutenant governor, Egbert and his family resided at Government House, and visited many areas of the province, remarking that Alberta "was one of the greatest places to live."

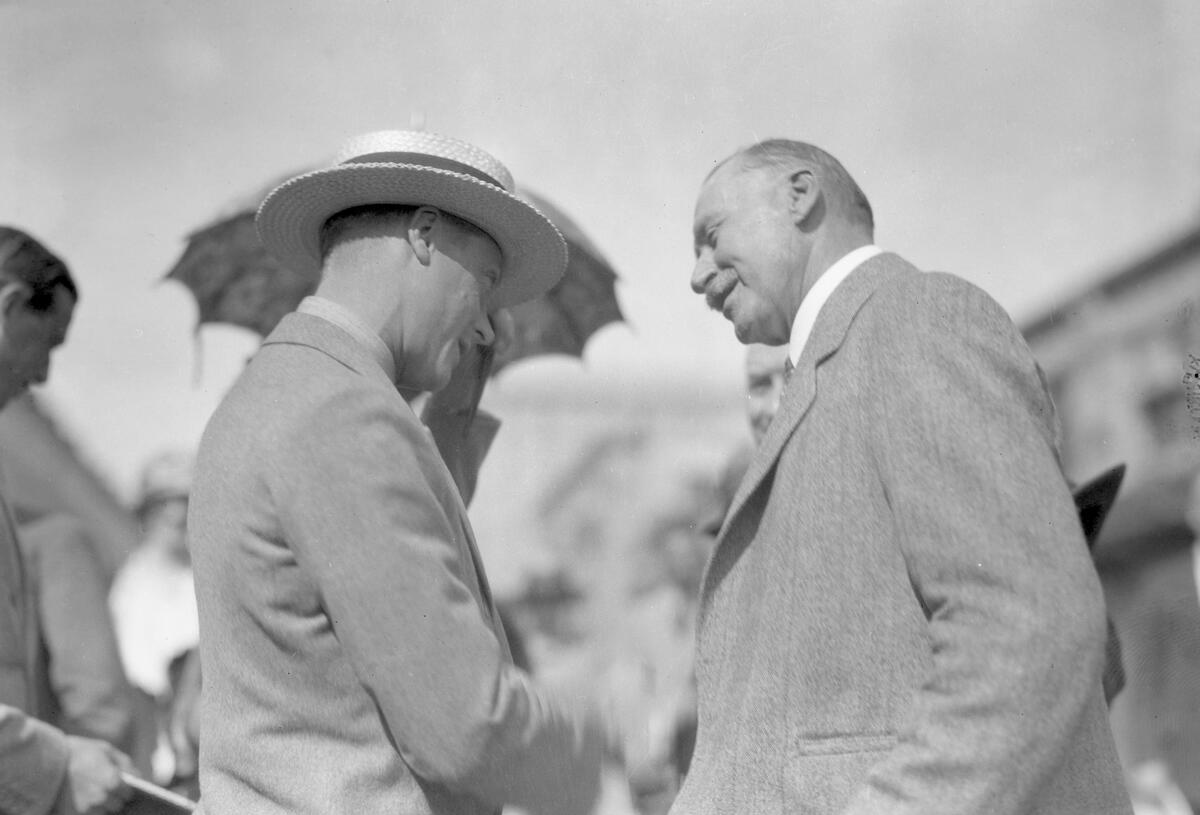
Egbert (right) meeting with Edward, Prince of Wales, in 1927.

As Lieutenant Governor, Egbert attended many functions, such as the Annual Convention of the Union of Alberta Municipalities and the welcoming ceremony of the new bishop of the Anglican Diocese of Calgary. He also gave speeches at events, such as the 100th anniversary of Father Albert Lacombe's birth and a speech at the Alberta Legislature Building as a member of National Committee for the Celebration of the Diamond Jubilee of Confederation that commemorated the importance and the achievements of the Fathers of Confederation.

Egbert and his family participated in events held to celebrate the 1927 visit of Edward, Prince of Wales, and Prince George, Duke of Kent, to Alberta. The following year, Egbert helped open the Canadian National Railway station in Edmonton. The same year saw the completion of the all-Canadian telephone service, which had connections between Edmonton, Calgary, Vancouver and Victoria. Among events held to celebrate this completion, Egbert participated in a telephone conversation with Lieutenant Governor of British Columbia Robert Randolph Bruce from Edmonton to Victoria. Despite a hectic schedule, Egbert took an interest in the University of Alberta, often entertaining groups of students (among whom he was popular), attending university events and hosting debate sessions. His term as lieutenant governor was extended in October 1930, and he served until his successor, William L. Walsh was sworn in on May 5, 1931.

== Personal life ==
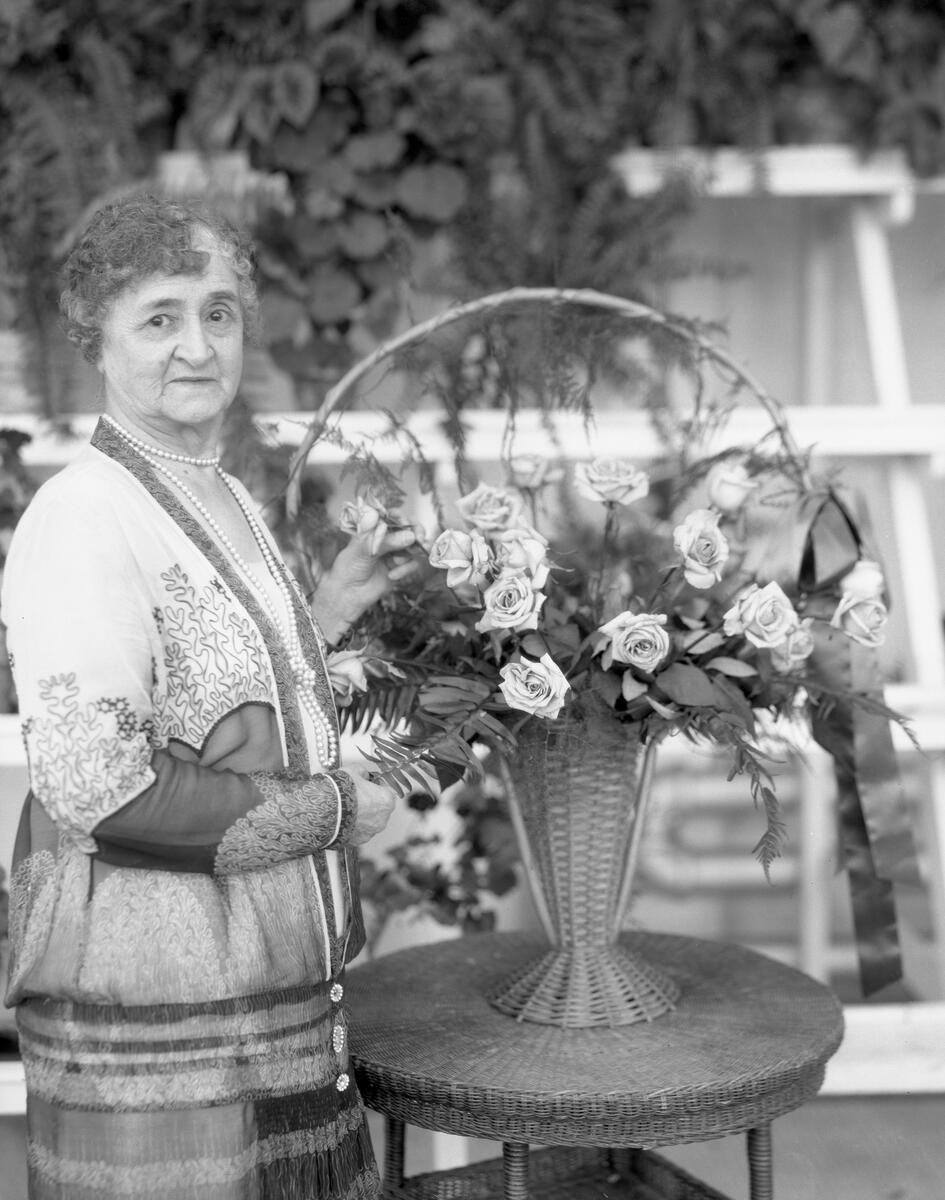
Mrs. William Egbert in Edmonton in 1928.

Egbert married Eva Catherine Miller on December 27, 1882. The couple had 3 children: Ethel Camilla (born 1884), William Gordon (born 1891), and Alice Leah (born 1895). Ethel graduated from the University of Toronto in 1908, and went on to become a librarian at the Calgary Law Society, and the Judges' Library at the Calgary Court House. William was a lawyer and became a judge of the Supreme Court of Alberta. He was also appointed King's Counsel, and was married to influential piano teacher Gladys Egbert. Their youngest daughter, Alice Leah, died at the age of one.

Egbert enjoyed many sporting activities, namely lacrosse and football in his younger years, and golf in his later years. His wife, Eva was described as "a lover of her home, her books, and a congenial circle of friends."

== Later activities, death and legacy ==
Following the end of his term as lieutenant governor, Egbert returned to Calgary to resume his medical practice. He received an honorary Doctor of Laws degree from the University of Alberta in 1927. In 1935, he became the chairman of the Economic Safety League, an establishment of representatives from various members of boards of trade and chambers of commerce throughout the province.

Egbert died on October 15, 1936, in Calgary, following a long illness. His funeral service on October 17, held at the Park Memorial Chapel in Calgary, was attended by more than 400 people. He is buried in Union Cemetery in Calgary, alongside his wife, who predeceased him by eight months.

As a physician, he was described as "humane, never withholding his services from the poorest and humblest, and his unremitting and unrewarded efforts in behalf of the suffering [would] give him rank in a profession eminently benevolent." Former Premier of Alberta Alexander Cameron Rutherford said that "[Egbert] fulfilled his duties as governor splendidly and as a private citizen he took an equally creditable and useful past in Alberta life." Future Lieutenant Governor John J. Bowlen stated "Dr. Egbert was one of the most popular lieutenant governors this province has ever had. He was kind and considerate to men of all points of view."

== Bibliography ==
- Perry, Sandra E.; Powell, Karen L. (2006). On Behalf of the Crown : Lieutenant Governors of the North-West Territories and Alberta, 1869-2005. Edmonton, Alberta: Legislative Assembly of Alberta. ISBN 0-9689217-4-4.
- MacRae, Archibald Oswald (1912). History of the province of Alberta, Volume 2. Calgary, Alberta: Western Canada History Co.
