= Gladys Egbert =

Canadian pianist and music instructor (1896 – 1968)

Gladys Alma Egbert
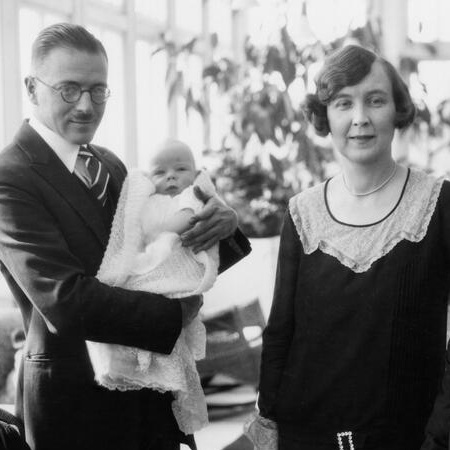
- Gladys Egbert (right) with husband and son (left).
- Born: Gladys Alma McKelvie; December 31, 1896; Rapid City, Manitoba
- Died: March 7, 1968 (aged 71); Calgary
- Education: Royal Academy of Music
- Occupations: Music instructor, pianist
- Years active: 1919–1968
- Spouse: William Gordon Egbert (married 1924)
- Children: 2
- Relatives: William Egbert (father-in-law)

Gladys Alma Egbert (née McKelvie; 31 December 1896 – 7 March 1968) was a Canadian music instructor. She was one of the founding members of the Western Board of Music, an examining body of music instruction that later became Conservatory Canada.

== Early life ==
Egbert was born Gladys McKelvie in Rapid City, Manitoba in 1896 to a schoolteacher mother and land agent father. Her family relocated to Calgary, Alberta in 1903, where she began studying piano under Ada Dowling Costigan shortly after arriving. She travelled to music lessons by riding a horse along dirt roads.

In 1909, Egbert became both the first Canadian and then-youngest student to receive a two-year scholarship to train at the Royal Academy of Music in London. Instead of accepting a third year that was offered to her by the academy, she relocated to New York in 1911 to study with Ignace Paderewski, Zygmunt Stojowski, and Ernest Hutcheson.

For most of her time in London, she lived alone, as her mother was only able to stay with her for a short period; her father's health was beginning to fail, so Egbert's mother returned to Canada to care for him.

== Career ==
In 1919, following the death of her father, Neil McKelvie, Egbert returned to Calgary. Doing so meant declining to pursue a concert career, but Egbert opted to return in order to support her mother. Egbert's studies with Hutcheson, who went on to serve as both dean and president of the Juilliard School of Music, continued intermittently until his death in 1951.

Soon after returning to Calgary, Egbert founded her own piano studio, which would prove to be a fifty-year endeavour. Notable students taught over her career included Jane Coop, Marek Jablonski, Marilyn Engle, and Diana McIntosh. For most of her career, she operated her school from one of the first stately homes introduced along Elbow Drive, originally built in 1910 for Harold L. Downey of the Calgary Garage Company.

Known affectionately to her students as "Mrs. E.," she developed a reputation for being protective over those she taught, and taking as much of an interest in nurturing their personal development as their musical aptitude. She particularly favoured baroque compositions, and the works of Joseph Haydn. To help her students interpret instrumental pieces, she encouraged them to compose personal lyrics, which they would silently recite as they played. As some students would journey to Egbert's studio from locations including Drumheller and Lethbridge, she attended recitals in their home towns in reciprocity for their travels.

In 1936, Egbert accepted an invitation to become one of the founding members of the Western Board of Music. The body conducted music education examinations in Saskatchewan, Alberta, and Manitoba, with an "outstanding" musician from each represented on the board. Egbert was selected to represent Alberta. Following a merger between the Western Board and the Western Ontario Conservatory of Music in 1997, after Egbert's death, the organization exists today as Conservatory Canada.

Also in 1936, Egbert became the first North American to be elected fellow of London's Royal Academy of Music. She became a founding member of the national incarnation of the Federation of Canadian Music Festivals in 1949.

In the 1960s, students of Egbert were well-represented among the winners of the CBC Radio Competitions for music. After 13 of Egbert's students won prizes at the 1964 Calgary Musical Festival, adjudicated James Gibb assessed Egbert to be "one of the world's best music teachers." When asked that year if she regretted dedicating her life to teaching, Egbert stated: "I can't think of anything I'd rather have done." Egbert was awarded an honorary degree by the University of Calgary in 1965 (then a satellite campus of the University of Alberta).

== Personal life ==
Egbert was married to lawyer and later judge, William Gordon Egbert from 1924 until his death in 1960. They had two children together: a son also named William, and a daughter, Wendy. Through her marriage, Egbert's father-in-law was William Egbert, third lieutenant governor of Alberta.

=== Death ===
Egbert died in 1968 at the age of seventy-one. Her funeral was conducted by Cecil Swanson, Archdeacon of Calgary. A year after her death, the Calgary Philharmonic Orchestra hosted a tribute concert at the Southern Alberta Jubilee Auditorium, featuring Egbert's students.

== Legacy ==
Since 1968, the annual Calgary Performing Arts Festival has offered the Rose Bowl scholarship in Egbert's honour.

Dr. Gladys McKelvie Egbert School, a junior high school managed by the Calgary Board of Education, is named for Egbert.
