= Order of precedence in Alberta =

Relative preeminence of officials for ceremonial purposes

The Alberta order of precedence is a nominal and symbolic hierarchy of important positions within the province of Alberta. It has no legal standing but is used to dictate ceremonial protocol at events of a provincial nature.

1. The King in Right of Alberta: His Majesty King Charles III
2. Lieutenant Governor of Alberta: Her Honour the Honourable Salma Lakhani AOE
3. Premier of Alberta: The Honourable Danielle Smith ECA MLA
4. The Chief Justice of The Court of Appeal of Alberta: The Honourable Justice Ritu Khullar
5. Former lieutenant governors of Alberta
  1. The Honourable Donald Ethell OC OMM MSC AOE CD
  2. The Honourable Lois Mitchell CM AOE
6. Former premiers of Alberta
  1. The Honourable Ed Stelmach ECA AOE
  2. The Honourable Alison Redford ECA KC
  3. The Honourable Dave Hancock ECA KC
  4. The Honourable Rachel Notley ECA
  5. The Honourable Jason Kenney PC ECA
7. Speaker of the Legislative Assembly of Alberta: Ric McIver ECA
8. Ambassadors and high commissioners accredited to Canada
9. Members of the Executive Council of Alberta, in relative order of precedence as determined by the premier
10. Leader of the Official Opposition: Christina Gray ECA MLA
11. Current members of the King's Privy Council for Canada resident in Alberta, with precedence given to current members of the federal cabinet
12. Members of the Legislative Assembly of Alberta with precedence governed by the date of their first election to the Legislature
13. Members of the Senate of Canada who represent Alberta, by date of appointment
  1. The Honourable Scott Tannas
  2. The Honourable Patti LaBoucane-Benson
  3. The Honourable Paula Simons
  4. The Honourable Karen Sorensen
  5. The Honourable Daryl Fridhandler KC
  6. The Honourable Kristopher Wells
14. Members of the House of Commons of Canada who represent Alberta constituencies, by date of election
  See Canadian federal election results in Calgary, Canadian federal election results in Edmonton and environs, and Canadian federal election results in rural Alberta
15. Superior court justices
  1. Chief Justice of the Court of King's Bench of Alberta: The Honourable Justice Kenneth G. Nielsen
  2. Justices of the Court of Appeal of Alberta
  3. Justices of the Court of King's Bench of Alberta
16. Heads of religious denominations
17. Heads of consular posts: consuls-general; consuls; vice-consuls; consular agents (Precedence is determined by the date that definitive recognition is given by the Governor General)
18. Judges of the Provincial Court of Alberta
  1. Chief Judge of the Provincial Court of Alberta
  2. Other judges by seniority of appointment
19. Mayors of Alberta municipalities
20. Aboriginal Leaders
  1. Chiefs of the Treaty First Nations in Alberta, in order of seniority of election to office;
  2. President of Métis Settlements General Council
  3. President of Métis Nation of Alberta: Audrey Poitras
21. Deputy Minister to the Premier and Cabinet Secretary
22. Clerk of the Legislative Assembly
23. Ombudsman
24. Provincial Auditor
25. Chief Electoral Officer
26. Ethics Commissioner: Marguerite Trussler
27. Information and Privacy Commissioner: Jill Clayton
28. Deputy Ministers
29. Senior Alberta government officials with rank of Deputy Minister as determined by the Executive Council
30. Chief executive officers of Crown corporations (relative precedence determined by date of appointment)
31. Leadership of Alberta universities
  1. Chancellor of the University of Alberta: Ralph B. Young
  2. Chancellor of the University of Calgary: Jim Dinning
  3. Chancellor of the University of Lethbridge: Shirley McClellan
  4. Chairman of the Board, University of Alberta
  5. Chairman of the Board, University of Calgary
  6. Chairman of the Board, University of Lethbridge
  7. Chairman of the Board, Athabasca University
  8. Chairman of the Board, Mount Royal University
  9. Chairman of the Board, MacEwan University
  10. President of the University of Alberta: David H. Turpin
  11. President of the University of Calgary: Ed McCauley
  12. President of the University of Lethbridge: Michael J. Mahon
  13. President of Athabasca University: Frits Pannekoek
  14. President of Mount Royal University: David Docherty
  15. President of Grant MacEwan University: David W. Atkinson
32. Police and military
  1. Commanding Officer, "K" Division, Royal Canadian Mounted Police: Curtis Zablocki
  2. Commander, 3rd Canadian Division: Brigadier-General W.H. Fletcher
  3. Commanding Officer, HMCS Nonsuch
  4. Commanding Officer, 1 Canadian Mechanized Brigade Group
  5. Commanding Officer, 1 Area Support Group
  6. Commanding Officer, 41 Canadian Brigade Group
  7. Commanding Officer, 4 Wing

== Sources ==
- Government of Alberta: Order of Precedence
