= Allan Merrick Jeffers =

American architect (1875–1926)

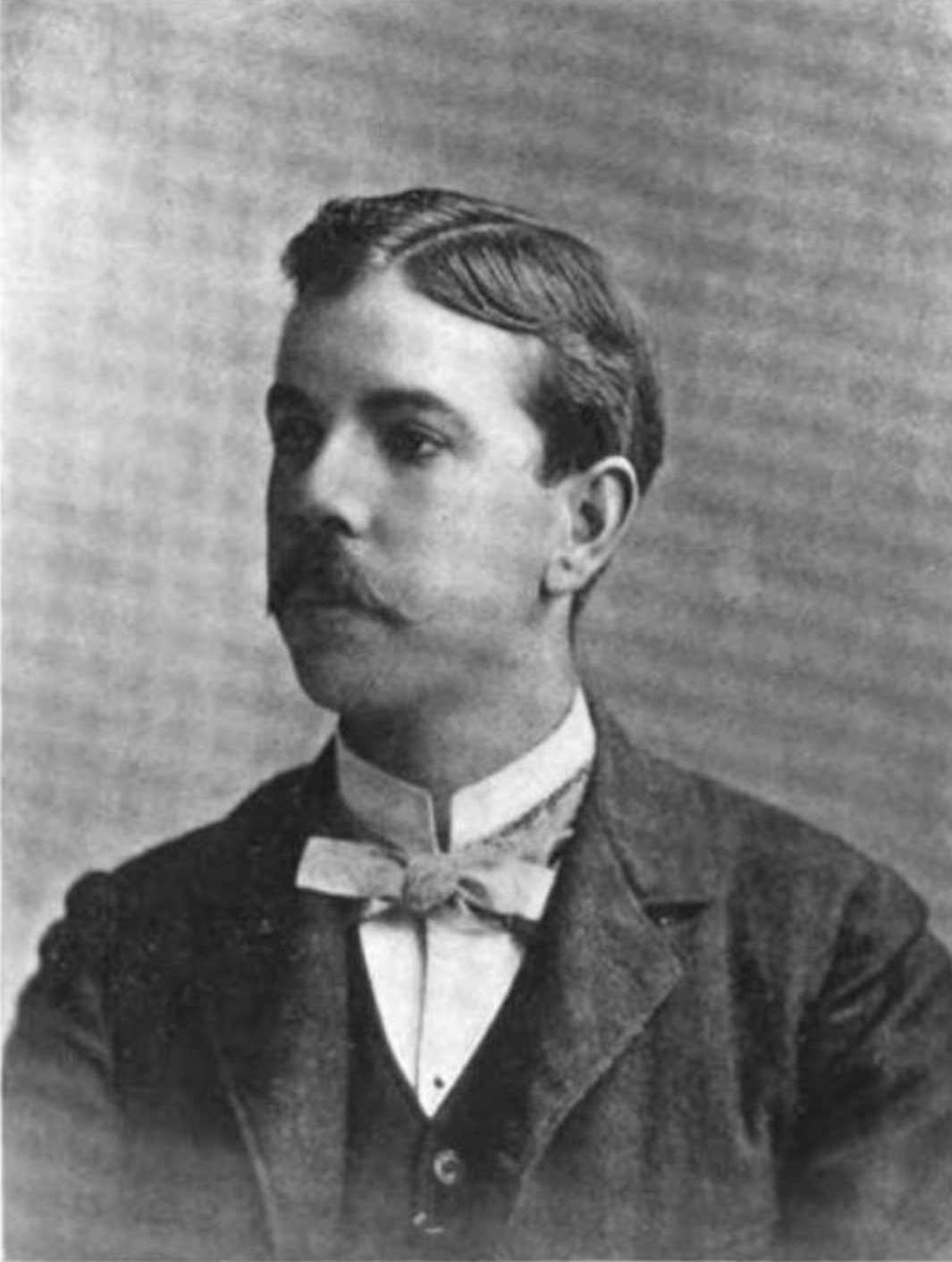
- Born: February 8, 1875; Pawtucket, Rhode Island
- Died: October 27, 1926 (aged 51); Los Angeles, California, US
- Education: Rhode Island School of Design
- Spouse: Lotta Annice Moore
- Children: 4

Allan Merrick Jeffers (1875–1926) was an American architect who practiced largely in Alberta, Canada.

== Biography ==
Allan Merrick Jeffers was born in Pawtucket, Rhode Island on February 8, 1875. Jeffers trained at the firm of architect George W. Cady in Providence and studied at the Rhode Island School of Design.

Following graduation, he relocated to Kansas City, Missouri. In October 1903, he married Lotta Annice Moore. Together, the couple had four children.

During his time in Kansas City, Jeffers won several design competitions. This drew the attention of Alberta Premier Alexander Cameron Rutherford who was seeking an architect to design the provincial legislature building for Alberta.

Upon invitation from Rutherford, Jeffers moved to Edmonton in April 1907, where he was hired as the Provincial Architect of Alberta on a five-year contract following the resignation of Edward Colis Hopkins. The same year, he was given responsibility for designing the Alberta Legislature Building, perhaps his best known work. He was also tasked with designing the Lieutenant Governor's residence, Government House, which was completed in 1913.

In 1912, following the completion of his contract, Jeffers was hired by the City of Edmonton as the city's chief architect. This position was removed in 1913, although less than a year later Jeffers was reinstated as the city's chief architect.

In 1923, Jeffers moved briefly to Prince Rupert, British Columbia, being returning to the United States. Settling in Los Angeles, California, he opened a private practice. He died un expectedly on October 27, 1926, in Los Angeles.

== Notable Buildings ==
- Calgary Normal School, Calgary (1906)
- Wetaskiwin Court House, Wetaskiwin (1907)
- Alberta Legislature Building (1907)
- Lands & Titles Building, Edmonton (1907)
- Athabasca Hall, University of Alberta (1911)
- Law Courts, Edmonton (1912) – demolished 1972
- North Edmonton Telephone Exchange, Edmonton (1912)
- Civic Block, Edmonton (1912)
- Government House (1913)
- Assiniboia Hall, University of Alberta (1913)
- Fort Saskatchewan Court House, Fort Saskatchewan (1909)
