= Government of Alberta =

Canadian provincial government

Government of Alberta Gouvernement de l'Alberta
- Provincial government

Overview
- Established: September 1, 1905
- Country: Canada
- Polity: Province
- Leader: Premier; Danielle Smith
- Appointed by: Lieutenant Governor; Salma Lakhani
- Main organ: Executive Council
- Responsible to: Alberta Legislature
- Headquarters: Edmonton
- Website: www.alberta.ca

The Government of Alberta (French: gouvernement de l'Alberta) is the body responsible for the administration of the Canadian province of Alberta. In modern Canadian use, the term Government of Alberta refers specifically to the executive—political ministers of the Crown (the Cabinet/Executive Council) who are appointed on the advice of the premier. Ministers direct the non-partisan civil service, who staff ministries and agencies to deliver government policies, programs, and services. The executive corporately brands itself as the Government of Alberta, or more formally, His Majesty's Government of Alberta (French: Gouvernement de l’Alberta de Sa Majesté).

Alberta operates in the Westminster system of government. The political party or coalition that wins the largest number of seats in the legislature forms government, and the party's leader becomes premier of Alberta and ministers are selected by the premier.

== Role of the Crown ==
Charles III is King in Right of Alberta

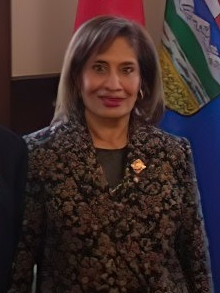
Salma Lakhani is Lieutenant Governor

King Charles III, as sovereign is also the King in Right of Alberta. As a Commonwealth realm, the Canadian monarch is shared with 14 other independent countries within the Commonwealth of Nations. Within Canada, the monarch exercises power individually on behalf of the federal government, and the 10 provinces.

The powers of the Crown are vested in the monarch and are exercised by the lieutenant governor. The advice of the premier and Executive Council is typically binding; the Constitution Act, 1867 requires executive power to be exercised only "by and with the Advice of the Executive Council".

=== Lieutenant governor ===
The lieutenant governor is appointed by the governor general, on the advice of the prime minister of Canada. Thus, it is typically the lieutenant governor whom the premier and ministers advise, exercising much of the royal prerogative and granting royal assent.

The executive power is vested in the Crown and exercised "in-Council", meaning on the advice of the Executive Council; conventionally, this is the Cabinet, which is chaired by the premier and comprises ministers of the Crown.

== Premier and Executive Council ==
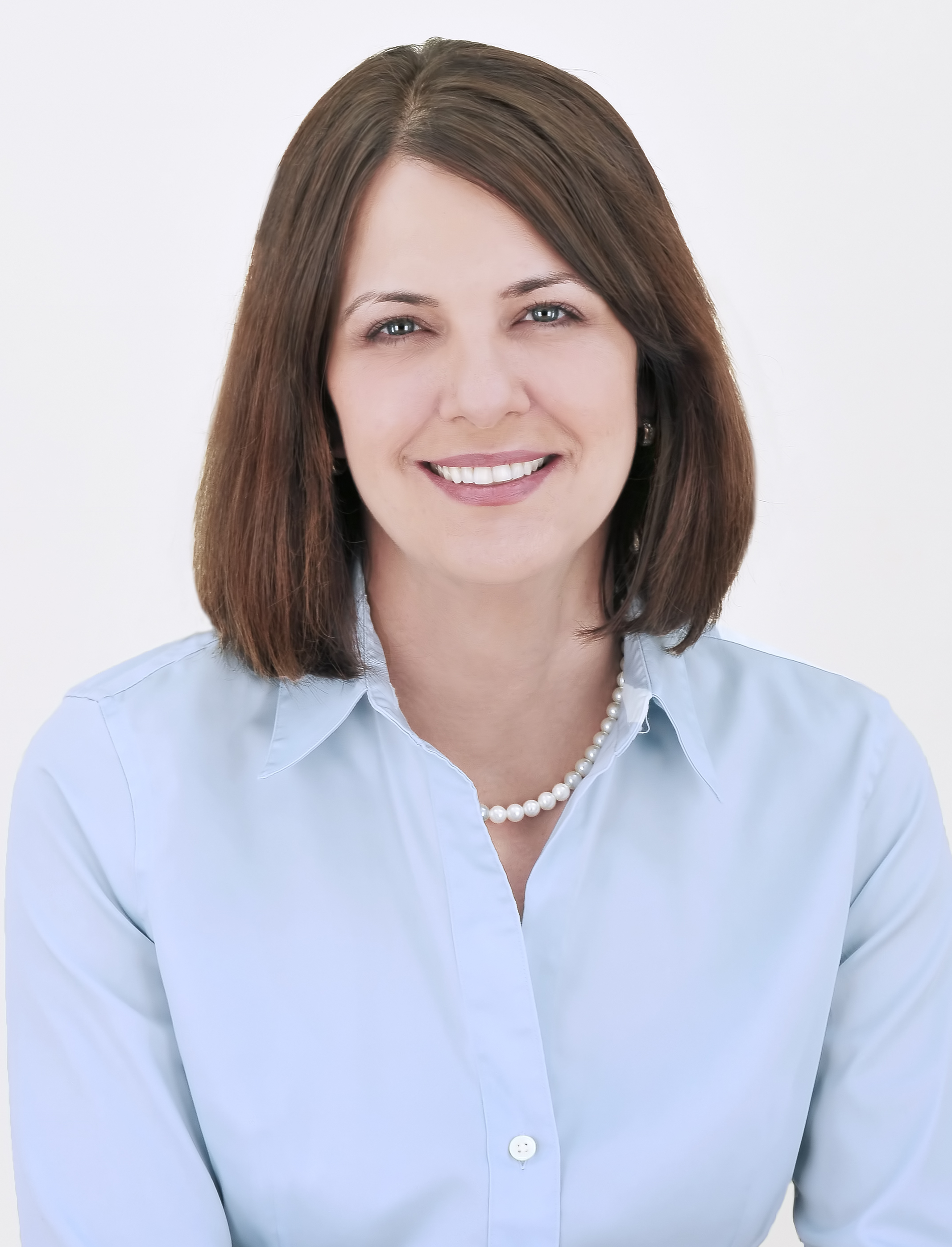
Danielle Smith is the current premier, Alberta's head of government

The term Government of Alberta, or more formally, His Majesty's Government refers to the activities of the Lieutenant Governor-in-Council. The day-to-day operation and activities of the Government of Alberta are performed by the provincial departments and agencies, staffed by the non-partisan public service, and directed by the elected government.

=== Premier ===
The premier of Alberta is the primary minister of the Crown. The premier acts as the head of government for the province, chairs and selects the membership of the Cabinet, and advises the Crown on the exercise of executive power and much of the royal prerogative. As premiers hold office by virtue of their ability to command the confidence of the elected Legislative Assembly, they typically sit as a member of the Legislative Assembly (MLA) and lead the largest party or a coalition in the Assembly. Once sworn in, the premier holds office until either they resign or are removed by the lieutenant governor after either a motion of no confidence or defeat in a general election.

Danielle Smith has served as Premier since October 11, 2022, when she won the leadership of her United Conservative Party.

== See also ==
- Politics of Alberta
