= William L. Walsh =

Canadian politician

The Honourable William L. Walsh KC
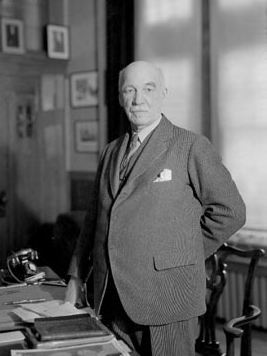

4th Lieutenant Governor of Alberta
- In office May 5, 1931 – October 1, 1936
- Monarchs: George V Edward VIII
- Governors General: The Earl of Bessborough; The Lord Tweedsmuir
- Premier: John Edward Brownlee; Richard Gavin Reid; William Aberhart
- Preceded by: William Egbert
- Succeeded by: Philip Primrose

Personal details
- Born: January 28, 1857 Simcoe, Canada West
- Died: January 13, 1938 (aged 80) Victoria, British Columbia
- Party: Conservative
- Spouses: Bessie McVittie (m. 1883; died 1925) Bertha Barber (m. 1931)
- Relations: Aquila Walsh, father
- Children: Marguerite "Greta" (1886–1913); Legh (1895–1938)
- Education: University of Toronto
- Occupation: Lawyer and judge
- Profession: Politician

William Legh Walsh KC (January 28, 1857 – January 13, 1938) was a Canadian lawyer and judge. He was the fourth lieutenant governor of Alberta from 1931 to 1936.

Walsh was born in that portion of the Province of Canada which would later become the province of Ontario. Upon attending public schools in his hometown of Simcoe, Walsh studied at the University of Toronto graduating in 1878 and then at Osgoode Hall Law School. After being called to the bar, he joined a practice in Orangeville, where he also held municipal offices as mayor and councillor. Drawn in by the Gold Rush, he then relocated to the Yukon where he established a practice with two others. Shortly after being created a king's counsel in 1903, Walsh moved south to Calgary, where he quickly established another practice. He remained in that firm for eight years, before being appointed to the Supreme Court of Alberta in 1912.

He was appointed lieutenant governor in 1931 and served in the office until 1936, when he was succeeded by his friend, Philip Primrose. He then retired to Victoria, British Columbia, where he died in 1938.

== Early life, education and career ==
Walsh was born in 1857 at Simcoe, Canada West, to Aquila and Jane Adams Walsh (née Wilson). His father, Aquila, born in Charlotteville Township, initially worked as a civil engineer, later serving as Deputy Registrar for Norfolk County and as a member of the House of Commons of Canada.

Walsh attended public schools in Simcoe, before he moved to Toronto and graduated from the University of Toronto and Osgoode Hall Law School, where he earned his Bachelor of Laws degree.

William Walsh was called to the bar in 1880 and practised law in Orangeville in the firm Maitland and McCarthy but soon left the firm for independent practice, under his own name, from 1885 to 1900. In 1889, he was elected a town councillor, serving on assessment, finance, public works and printing committees. He had also participated as a school trustee. He went on to twice serve as mayor of Orangeville, from 1890 to 1891 and in 1899.

== Legal career ==
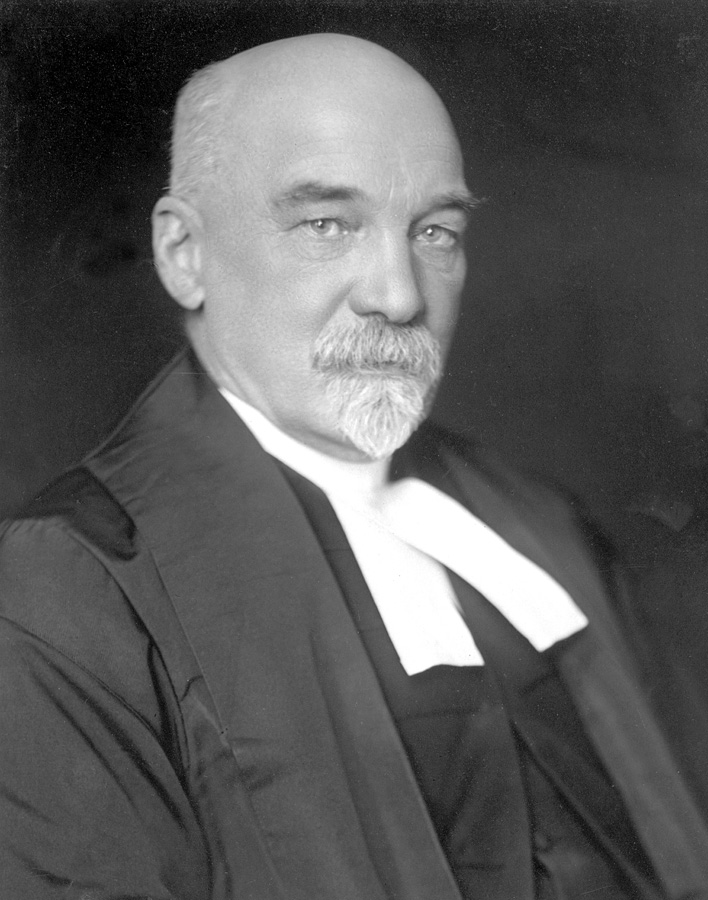
Justice William L. Walsh

In 1900, enticed by the Klondike Gold Rush, Walsh moved to the Yukon. After being called to the Yukon bar in 1900, he became a partner in the firm, Tabor, Walsh, & Hulme in Dawson. He was created a king's counsel in 1903. He also invested in gold-mining, but failed to gain profits from the investments. In 1904, Walsh was an unsuccessful candidate for Mayor of Dawson.

Walsh moved to Calgary in 1904, and was admitted to the bar on June 10 of that year. He joined a law firm as a senior partner of the firm Walsh, McCarthy and Carson. One of his first cases, in 1904, was defending a man accused of horse theft, being heard by the Chief Justice Arthur Sifton and the Supreme Court of the North-West Territories. He was a member of the benchers of the Law Society of Alberta from 1907 to 1912, and in 1910 was appointed as one of two counsels to the royal commission on the Alberta and Great Waterways Railway scandal.

Walsh was a prominent trial lawyer, claiming several victories in several "major precedent-setting cases". Fellow lawyer and future Prime Minister of Canada R. B. Bennett reportedly referred to Walsh as "the best potential railway lawyer in the province". He was appointed to the Supreme Court of Alberta in 1912, and upon its restructuring of courts into appellate and trial divisions in 1921, became a judge of the Appellate Division in Calgary.

He travelled all over the province, going as far north to Peace River, and south to Lethbridge to hear cases. The most notable trial that Walsh presided over was that of Emilio Picariello, for the murder of Alberta Provincial Police Constable Stephen Lawson. After the murder charge was laid by Attorney General of Alberta John Edward Brownlee, Picariello and his accomplice, Florence Lassandra were found guilty of their crimes and were sentenced to hang. The execution was carried out on May 2, 1923. Walsh was a strong believer that capital punishment was a strong deterrent to crime, sentencing 18 convicted criminals to hang, earning him the nickname "the Hanging Judge".

== Political career ==
In the 1896 federal election, Walsh was an unsuccessful Conservative candidate for the Cardwell constituency in Ontario.

In 1905, he became the first President of the Conservative Association of Alberta, in which he also was the party's chief organizer. He ran in a 1906 by-election for the provincial constituency of Gleichen, but was unsuccessful, losing by just over 100 votes to Liberal Ezra Riley.

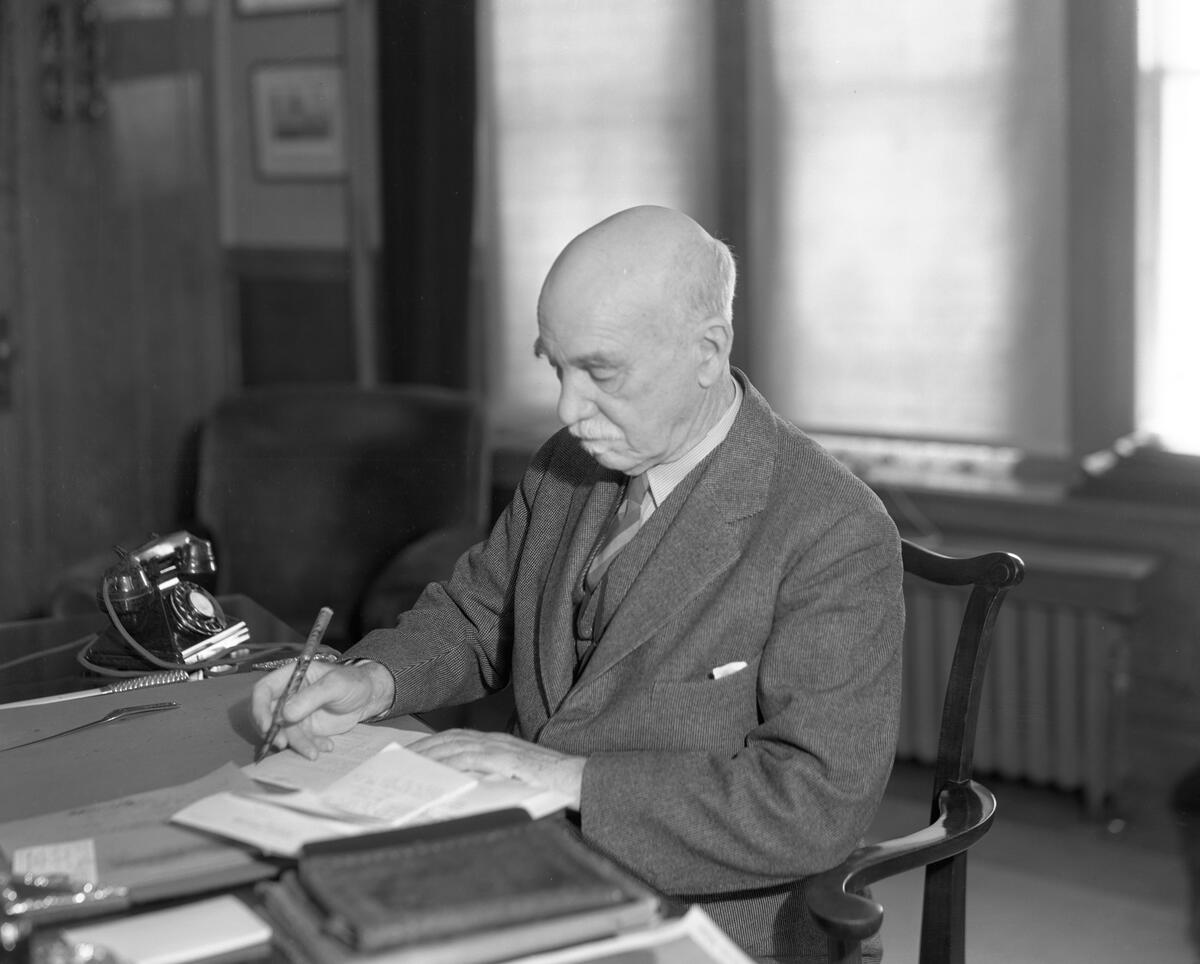
Lieutenant Governor Walsh in his office

=== Lieutenant Governor of Alberta ===
Upon the advice of Prime Minister Bennett, William L. Walsh was appointed Lieutenant Governor of Alberta by Governor General of Canada Vere Ponsonby, 9th Earl of Bessborough on April 24, 1931. He was sworn in on May 5 of the same year. His term in office of lieutenant governor was associated with the John Brownlee sex scandal, when Premier John Brownlee was accused of seducing Vivian MacMillan, a family friend and secretary of Brownlee. Although awarded a legal victory on July 2, 1934, Brownlee resigned from the post a week later. The United Farmers of Alberta caucus selected Richard Gavin Reid as their new leader, and, at Reid's request, Walsh delayed his acceptance of Brownlee's resignation to allow Reid to form a cabinet.

Most of Walsh's everyday duties as lieutenant governor consisted of attending official functions and supporting charitable causes. He also gave many speeches and addresses, including one at the June 7, 1931, unveiling of the Lethbridge War Memorial, and a radio address as Chief Scout of Alberta to assist Boy Scouts with fundraising efforts. Walsh's term as lieutenant governor was extended twice, initially for four months, and subsequently for another month. He served until his successor, a good friend of his from his days in the Yukon, Philip Primrose was sworn in on October 1, 1936. Sworn in at the age of 74, Walsh is the third oldest person sworn into the office of Lieutenant Governor of Alberta.

== Personal life ==
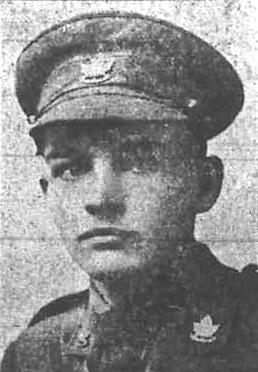
Walsh's son, Legh Aquila

Walsh married Bessie Amelia McVittie at Barrie, Ontario, on November 14, 1883. The couple had two children: Marguerite "Greta" Clare (1886–1913) and Legh Aquila (1895–1938). His daughter Marguerite married Dr. George Robinson Pirie (1879–1938), a prominent children's doctor and member of the Royal College of Physicians (1931). They were married in Calgary on April 14, 1909. Dr. Pirie was Superintendent of the Great Ormond Street children's hospital in England from 1914 to 1919. They had one child, Miss Margaret Walsh Pirie (Mrs. R. O. Funston). Legh Walsh enlisted in the Canadian Expeditionary Force during World War I and served the duration of the war. At the time of his enlistment he described his occupation as law student. He became a lieutenant in the 82nd Battalion in May 1916. He was wounded at Flers–Courcelette in 1916, returned briefly to Calgary, and then sailed back to the front. After the war he returned to Calgary in April 1919 and resumed his law studies. After being called to the Law Society of Alberta in 1920, he was created a king's counsel and made secretary of the Law Society of Alberta in 1932. Bessie Walsh died after a long illness in 1925. William Legh Walsh later married Bertha Main Barber, widow of a Royal Navy commander, on April 22, 1931.

Walsh enjoyed many activities in his free time. While living in the Yukon, he was a member of a curling team that won the Yukon championship. In Calgary, Walsh was a member of the Calgary Golf and Country Club, and, 1907 was the first president of the Canadian Club of Calgary. An avid golfer, Walsh founded a seniors' golf tournament named for him that still is held presently, alternatively in Edmonton and Calgary.

In 1931, he was made an honorary chief by Chief Sitting Eagle, who gave him his own name of "Sitting Eagle (Pee'topi)" of the Blood Nation. He received an honorary doctor of laws degree and an honorary rank of colonel of the University of Alberta Contingent of the Canadian Officers' Training Corps from the University of Alberta in 1932. In 1934, he was admitted as a knight of grace of the Most Venerable Order of the Hospital of St. John of Jerusalem. Additionally, in 1981, the City of Edmonton named Walsh Crescent, in the Westridge neighbourhood in the southwestern part of the city after the former lieutenant governor.

== Death and legacy ==
William L. Walsh died on January 13, 1938, of heart failure following a stroke in Victoria, British Columbia. A simple service was held in Calgary at the Pro-Cathedral Church of the Redeemer, which was attended by the then Lieutenant Governor of Alberta John C. Bowen, University of Alberta President William Alexander Robb Kerr and leaders of Alberta's legal system and Royal Canadian Mounted Police. He was buried in Calgary's Union Cemetery. His wife, Bertha, died on August 20, 1943, and was cremated. His first wife, Bessie, who died in 1925, was buried in Simcoe.

Affectionately referred to as "Daddy Walsh", Walsh was well-liked amongst his many friends. William A. R. Kerr, president of the University of Alberta said of him, "All who knew [Walsh] … not only respected him for his gifts of mind and character but loved him as a fine warm-hearted human being." L. Ralph Sherman, an Anglican bishop of Calgary described his legacy as "a record of integrity, devotion to duty and service which will be an inspiration."

== Bibliography ==
- Perry, Sandra E.; Powell, Karen L. (2006). On Behalf of the Crown : Lieutenant Governors of the North-West Territories and Alberta, 1869-2005. Edmonton, Alberta: Legislative Assembly of Alberta. ISBN 0-9689217-4-4.
- MacRae, Archibald Oswald (1912). History of the province of Alberta, Volume 2. Calgary, Alberta: Western Canada History Co.
- Mardon, Ernest G.; Mardon, Austin A. (2011). Alberta's Judicial Leadership: A Biographical Account. Edmonton, Alberta: Golden Meteorite Press. ISBN 978-1-897472-32-3.
