= Helen Hunley =

Canadian politician

The Honourable Helen Hunley OC AOE

12th Lieutenant Governor of Alberta
- In office January 22, 1985 – March 11, 1991
- Monarch: Elizabeth II
- Governors General: Jeanne Sauvé; Ray Hnatyshyn
- Premier: Peter Lougheed; Don Getty
- Preceded by: Frank Lynch-Staunton
- Succeeded by: Gordon Towers

Member of the Legislative Assembly of Alberta
- In office August 30, 1971 – March 14, 1979
- Preceded by: Alfred Hooke
- Succeeded by: John Murray Campbell
- Constituency: Rocky Mountain House

Personal details
- Born: Wilma Helen Hunley; September 6, 1920 Acme, Alberta, Canada
- Died: October 22, 2010 (aged 90) Rocky Mountain House, Alberta, Canada
- Party: Progressive Conservative
- Occupation: Telephone operator, insurance businesswoman

Wilma Helen Hunley OC AOE (September 6, 1920 – October 22, 2010) was a Canadian politician and the 12th Lieutenant Governor of Alberta, the first woman to serve in that post.

== Early life ==
She was born in Acme, Alberta, to James Edgar Hunley and Esta May Hunley. She first worked as an operator, served overseas in the Canadian Women's Army Corps during World War II and eventually owned and operated an International Harvester franchise and an insurance business.

== Political career ==
Hunley served as a town councilor from 1960 to 1966 and then mayor of Rocky Mountain House, Alberta, from 1966 to 1971. Hunley was elected to the province's legislative assembly as a Progressive Conservative. She was the province's cabinet minister serving as Minister Without Portfolio from 1971 to 1973, Solicitor-General from 1973 to 1975 and then Minister of Social Services and Community Health from 1975 until 1979 when she retired from politics.

In June, 1980, Hunley was appointed chair of the Alberta Mental Health Advisory Council. She also served on the Alberta 75th Anniversary Commission.

Hunley became president of the Progressive Conservative Party of Alberta in 1984 and, in 1985, was appointed by Governor General Jeanne Sauvé, on the advice of Prime Minister Brian Mulroney, to the position of lieutenant-governor. She served in the position until 1991. In 1992, she was made an Officer of the Order of Canada.

== Arms ==
Coat of arms of Helen Hunley

Crest
A demi lion Or armed Gules wearing a coronet érablé Azure and gorged with a collar of wild roses leaved proper holding between the forepaws a torch Azure enflamed Or and Gules;
Escutcheon
Azure a pile reversed of ears of wheat Or issuant from base and in chief two mullets also Or;
Supporters
On a compartment of grassland proper dexter a horse Or langued Gules crined, queued and unguled Azure gorged with a collar Azure pendant therefrom a lozenge Azure charged with a key in pale its ward firred Or sinister a deer Or attired and unguled Azure gorged with a like collar and pendant;
Motto
WITH COURAGE WE SERVE

== Bibliography ==
- Perry, Sandra E.; Powell, Karen L. (2006). On Behalf of the Crown : Lieutenant Governors of the North-West Territories and Alberta, 1869-2005. Edmonton, Alberta: Legislative Assembly of Alberta. ISBN 0-9689217-4-4.
