= Wetaskiwin Court House =

Coordinates: 52°58′06″N 113°22′01″W

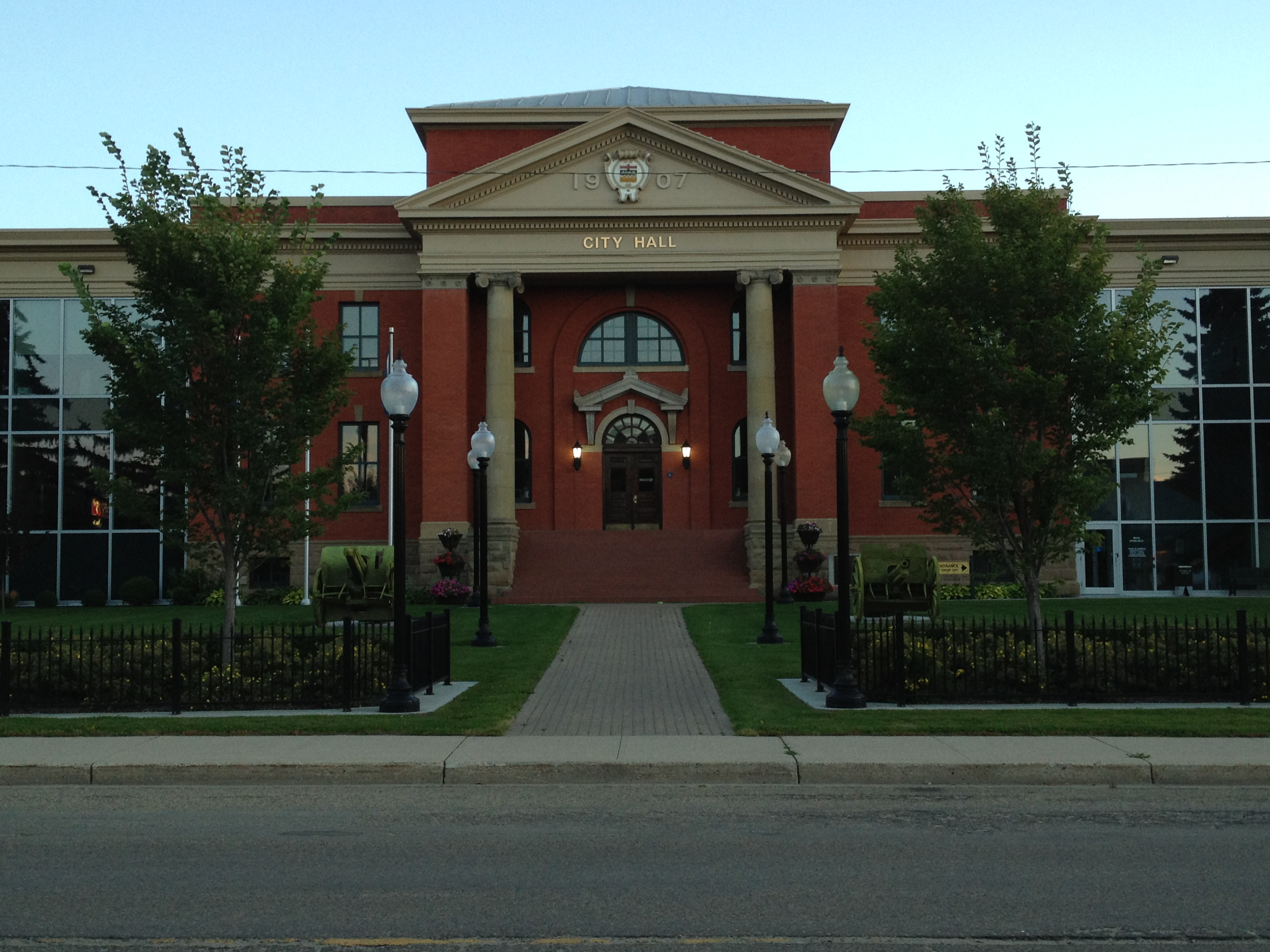
- North facade of the court house
- Interactive map of the Wetaskiwin Court House area

General information
- Location: 4705 50th Avenue, Wetaskiwin, Alberta, Canada
- Construction started: 1907
- Completed: 1909

Design and construction
- Architect: Allan Merrick Jeffers

National Historic Site of Canada
- Official name: Wetaskiwin Court House National Historic Site of Canada
- Designated: 1981

Wetaskiwin Court House is a courthouse and National Historic Site of Canada located in the city of Wetaskiwin, Alberta.

== Description ==
The Wetaskiwin Court House is a large two-storey flat-roofed building made of brick and sandstone. The front face has a projecting pediment featuring the provincial crest and the date of its construction, 1907 supported by brick piers and two ionic pillars. The entrance below has semi-circle windows both in the tympanum and overtop the doorway. The exterior shows ornamental elements such as lintels, sills, and pilasters as well as both round-arched and single-hung windows with sandstone keystones. The building has been renovated to include two new ells with large glass-panel windows on either side of the original structure for more auxiliary space.

== History ==
After the establishment of the modern judicial system in Alberta, which both central and district courts, Wetaskiwin was made one of five judicial districts alongside Calgary, Edmonton, Lethbridge, and Macleod. The interior layout hosted a holding cell and police services in the basement, court administration on the first floor, and a courtroom on the second floor. It was designed by the architect A. M. Jeffers, an American who was the provincial architect, best known for designing the Alberta Legislature Building in Edmonton.
