= Jane Coop =

Canadian pianist and music pedagogue (born 1950)

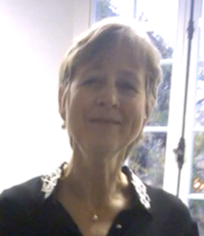
Jane Coop

Jane Austin Coop (born 18 April 1950) is a Canadian pianist and music pedagogue. An internationally recognized concert pianist, she has appeared as a recitalist and as a soloist with major symphony orchestras throughout the world. She has performed at such venues as the Bolshoi Hall in Saint Petersburg, the Kennedy Center, Alice Tully Hall, Roy Thomson Hall, the Hong Kong Cultural Centre, the Beijing Concert Hall, and the Salle Gaveau in Paris. From 1980 to 2012 she taught on the faculty of the University of British Columbia’s School of Music in Vancouver. In December 2012, she was appointed a member of the Order of Canada. In May, 2019 she was appointed to the Order of British Columbia (O.B.C.)

== Life and career ==
Born in Saint John, New Brunswick, and raised in Calgary, Coop studied with Alexandra Munn and Gladys Egbert as a child. At the age of 18 she entered the University of Toronto where she studied piano with Anton Kuerti from 1968 to 1972 and earned an Artist Diploma in 1971 and a Bachelor of Music in 1972. In 1970 she won the CBC Talent Festival and in 1971 she won the W. O. Forsyth Memorial Scholarship which enabled her to pursue studies in London with Peter Feuchtwanger in 1972–1973.

Coop entered the graduate music program at the Peabody Conservatory in the Fall of 1973 where she studied piano with Leon Fleisher. She graduated from Peabody with a Master of Music in Piano Performance in 1974. Two Canada Council grants enabled her to continue studies with Fleisher through 1976. While at Peabody, she won the Baldwin Prize in the Maryland International Piano Competition in 1972 and made her professional debut as a concert pianist at the St. Lawrence Centre for the Arts in Toronto in 1973.

In 1975 Coop won the Washington International Piano Competition, and was awarded the only prize for piano performance in New York's Concert Artists Guild International Competition. She was a finalist at the Munich International Piano Competition in 1977.

She is a regular artist at the Kneisel Hall Chamber Music Festival in Blue Hill, Maine, and has participated in summer and winter festivals across Canada, Europe, the US and Japan.

She has been a juror at the Dublin International Competition (Ireland) and the Kapell (Maryland), Hilton Head (South Carolina), NYIPC (New York), Honens (Calgary), and Washington International (DC) competitions, as well as the Coleman (Los Angeles, and Fischoff (South Bend, IN) chamber music competitions. She has also been a jury member for the Governor General's Performing Arts Awards, the Glenn Gould Prize, the Hnatyshyn Foundation Developing Artists Grants and various Canada Council grant awards.

== Discography ==
Solo

- Mozart – Piano Pieces (Skylark Music SKY8801)
- Haydn – Piano Sonatas (Skylark Music SKY8501)
- The Romantic Piano, Vol. I (Skylark Music SKY0702)
- The Romantic Piano, Vol. II (CBC Records MVCD1083)
- Beethoven – Eroica Variations, Sonatas Op. 109 and Op. 111 (Skylark Music SKY8802)
- Themes and Variations – Schubert, Schumann, Brahms, Mendelssohn, Faure (Skylark Music SKY 9201)
- Chopin – The Late Works, Op. 45, 57, 58, 60 and 61 (Skylark Music SKY9902)
- Chopin – Nocturnes and Mazurkas (Skylark Music SKY9601)
- A Century of Piano Classics – Beethoven-Sonata, Op 7; Brahms- Klavierstucke, Op 119; Chopin – Scherzo 4, Op. 54 (Skylark Music SKY0901)
- Beethoven – The Young Innovator Sonatas Op. 10, No. 3; Op. 27, No. 2; and Op. 28 (Skylark Music SKY1601)
- Three Keyboard Masters – Bach/Beethoven/Rachmaninoff (Skylark Music SKY 1901)

Concertos

- Prokofiev – No. 1; Bartok- No. 3; Malcolm Forsyth (Calgary Philharmonic/Mario Bernardi) (Skylark Music SKY1703)
- English Piano Concerti – Britten; Rawsthorne; Ireland; Finzi (Skylark Music SKY1702)

Collaborations

- Mozart Piano Quartets – Members of the Orford Quartet (Skylark Music SKY9002)
- Quatuor Satie – with Satie String Quartet – Quartets of Fauré, Ravel, Màche (Skylark Music SKY0601)
- Brahms – A Journey of Longing (with soprano Donna Brown, violist Yariv Aloni) – Songs of Brahms, plus 3 Intermezzi, Op 117 (Skylark Music SKY1501)
- Beethoven – Complete Violin and Piano Sonatas – with Andrew Dawes, violin (Skylark Music SKY0101)
- Chamber Music of Brahms and Jenner – with James Campbell, clarinet/Martin Hackleman, horn/Martin Beaver, violin (Skylark Music SKY1701)
- Music of Arnold Bax and York Bowen – with Doris Lederer, viola (Centaur CRC2660)
