= Diana McIntosh =

Canadian musician (1932–2022)

Diana Maud McIntosh (March 4, 1932 – December 16, 2022) was a Canadian composer and pianist who was based in Winnipeg, Manitoba.

== Early life and education ==
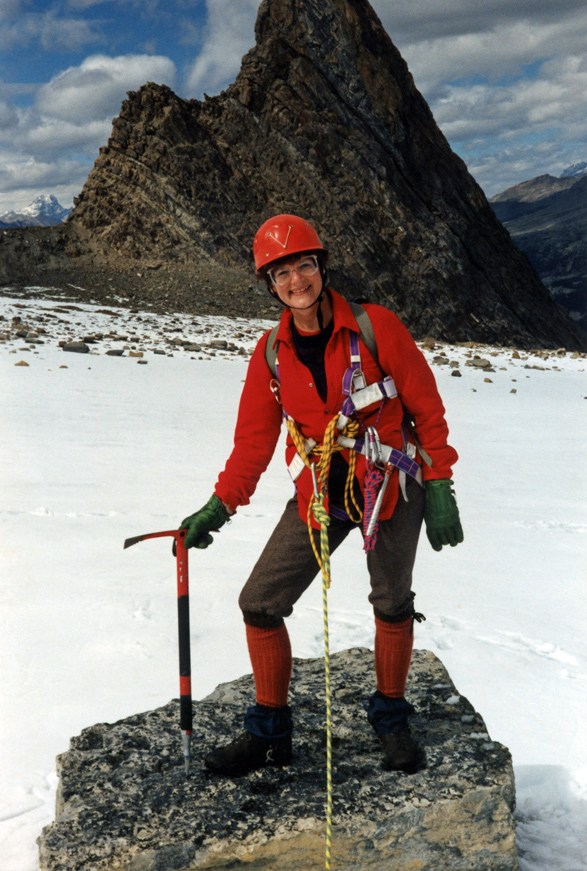

McIntosh was born Diana Maud Lowes in Calgary, Alberta. She earned an associate degree from The Royal Conservatory of Music in 1957 and a Licentiate in Music in 1961. While there she was a pupil of Boris Roubakine. In 1972, she received a Bachelor of Music from the University of Manitoba where she was a pupil of Alma Brock-Smith and Robert Turner. She also studied with Adele Marcus at the Aspen Music Festival and School and privately in New York City. Her other teachers included Gladys Egbert (studies in Calgary), Leonard Isaacs (studies in Winnipeg), and Michael Colgrass (studies in Toronto).

== Career ==
Brazilian-Canadian pianist Luciane Cardassi says of McIntosh, “Her music has specific characteristics such as humour, contrast, surprise, and a lyrical aspect. It was always so fun to be at her concerts, which is not always true about contemporary music performances.” Cardassi adds, “She was so careful about the colours of each sound – certainly about rhythm, but the colours, I think, had a special place in her heart.”

Hailed by the Canadian Encyclopedia as "a champion of 20th-century Canadian music", McIntosh premiered piano works by such Canadian composers as Peter Allen (Logos, 1977), Norma Beecroft (Cantorum Vitae, 1981), Robert Daigneault (Corridors, Reminiscences, 1977), Alexina Louie (Pearls, 1980), Marjan Mozetich (Apparition 1985), Boyd McDonald (Fantasy, 1974), Jean Papineau-Couture (Les Arabesques d'Isabelle, 1990), Ann Southam (Four Bagatelles, 1964 & Integruities, 1973 & Inter-views, 1975), Robert Turner (Homage to Melville, 1974), and John Winiarz (Vortices, 1977).

In 1977, she and Southam co-founded Music Inter Alia (MIA), a concert series of "contemporary music for people who don't like contemporary music". She served as the MIA's director until 1991. She was one of the founding artistic directors of the Winnipeg-based new-music organization GroundSwell.

== Personal life ==
McIntosh was married to David Grant McIntosh (1924–2010). They shared a love of hiking, climbing, and skiing in the Rockies. She died December 16, 2022, in Winnipeg, Manitoba.
