= Clarence Primrose =

Canadian politician

The Hon. Clarence Primrose

Senator for Pictou, Nova Scotia
- In office November 28, 1892 – December 2, 1902
- Appointed by: John Abbott

Personal details
- Born: October 5, 1830 Pictou, Nova Scotia
- Died: December 2, 1902 (aged 72)
- Party: Liberal-Conservative

Clarence Primrose (October 5, 1830 – December 2, 1902) was a Canadian politician.

Born in Pictou, Nova Scotia, the son of the James Primrose of Scottish descent, Primsrose was educated at the Pictou Academy and University of Edinburgh, Scotland. He was a senior partner of the insurance, lumber and general commission merchants firm of Primrose Brothers in Pictou, Nova Scotia. He was President of YMCA of Pictou, of the Pictou Marine Railway Company, the Maritime Marine Insurance Company, the Pictou Publishing Company, and the Liberal-Conservative Central Executive Committee. He was appointed to the Senate on the advice of John Joseph Caldwell Abbott on November 28, 1892 representing the senatorial division of Pictou, Nova Scotia. A Liberal-Conservative, he served 10 years until his death in 1902.
