= Conservatory Canada =

Canadian music education organization

Conservatory Canada is a music education organization and examining body headquartered in London, Ontario, formally incorporated in 1997 as the result of the merger of The Western Board of Music and the Western Ontario Conservatory of Music.

Conservatory Canada offers both a classical and a contemporary curriculum for a variety of instruments including piano, voice, guitar, violin, and musical theory.

== Publications ==
Conservatory Canada produces several publications to support its examination curriculum, made available through Novus Via Music Group in cooperation with Hal Leonard.

== eExams ==
Conservatory Canada is one of the few music examining bodies in the world that offers "virtual" examinations, branded as eExams. By utilizing Internet midi and video conferencing, students can be examined for each level at a distance, making examinations available to remote regions in Canada and the world.
