= John C. Bowen =

Canadian politician, clergyman, and insurance broker

The Honourable John C. Bowen
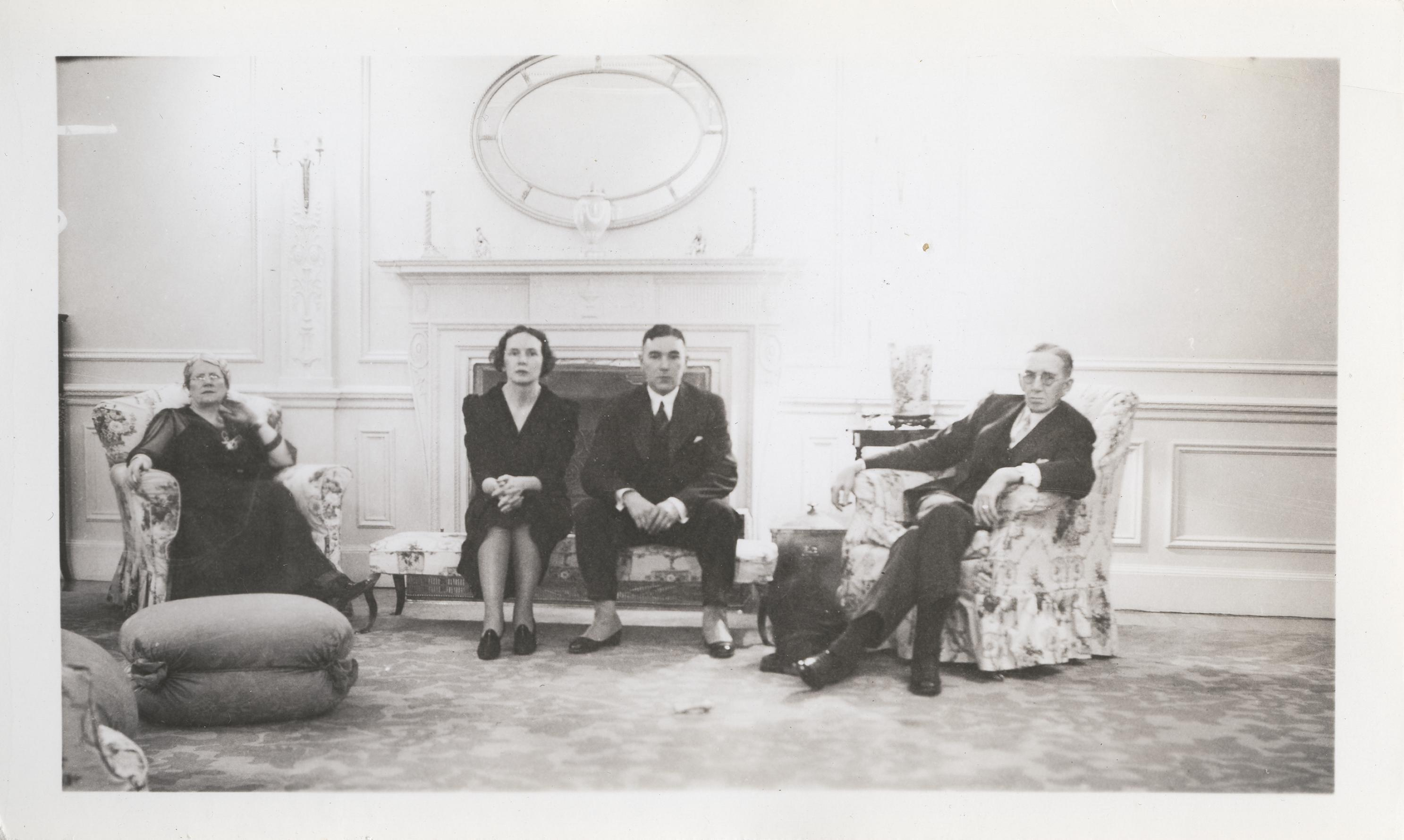
- Lt.-Gov. John Bowen (right) in the sitting room of Government House, Edmonton

6th Lieutenant Governor of Alberta
- In office March 23, 1937 – February 1, 1950
- Monarch: George VI
- Governors General: The Lord Tweedsmuir; The Earl of Athlone; The Viscount Alexander of Tunis
- Premier: William Aberhart; Ernest Manning
- Preceded by: Philip Primrose
- Succeeded by: John J. Bowlen

Alberta Official Opposition Leader
- In office March 15, 1926 – June 28, 1926
- Preceded by: Charles Mitchell
- Succeeded by: Vacant until James Walker (1941)

Leader of the Alberta Liberal Party
- In office March 15, 1926 – June 28, 1926
- Preceded by: Charles Mitchell
- Succeeded by: Joseph Shaw

Member of the Legislative Assembly of Alberta
- In office July 18, 1921 – June 28, 1926 Serving with John Boyle, Jeremiah Heffernan, William Henry, Nellie McClung and Andrew McLennan
- Preceded by: New district
- Succeeded by: David Duggan; Charles Gibbs; John Lymburn; Warren Prevey; Charles Weaver
- Constituency: Edmonton

City of Edmonton Alderman
- In office December 8, 1919 – December 12, 1921 Serving with Alderman elected in 1919
- In office December 12, 1927 – December 10, 1928 Serving with Alderman elected in 1927

Personal details
- Born: John Campbell Bowen; October 3, 1872 Metcalfe, Ontario
- Died: January 2, 1957 (aged 84) Edmonton, Alberta
- Party: Liberal
- Spouse: Edith Oliver (m. 1906)
- Children: 2
- Education: McMaster University
- Occupation: Clergyman, Insurance broker, politician

Military service
- Allegiance: Canada
- Branch/service: Canadian Expeditionary Force
- Years of service: 1915–1918
- Rank: Captain
- Unit: Chaplain
- Battles/wars: World War I

John Campbell Bowen (October 3, 1872 – January 2, 1957) was a clergyman, insurance broker and long serving politician and government official in Alberta, Canada. He served as an alderman in the City of Edmonton and went on to serve as a member of the Legislative Assembly of Alberta from 1921 to 1926, sitting with the Liberal caucus in opposition. He also briefly led the provincial Liberal party in 1926.

Bowen served as the sixth and longest-serving lieutenant governor of Alberta from 1937 to 1950.

== Early life ==
John Campbell Bowen was born in Metcalfe, Ontario, on October 3, 1872. He was the son of Peter Bowen and Margaret Poaps, and grew up in Ottawa.

He took his post-secondary education at Brandon Baptist College, where he earned a degree in theology, and also at McMaster University. After university he moved west to Dauphin, Manitoba, to become the pastor of the Baptist church in that town. He married Edith Oliver on October 25, 1906.

Bowen moved to Edmonton, Alberta, with his family in May 1907 to become pastor of Strathcona Baptist Church. Through his work he became good friends with Alexander Cameron Rutherford, the first Premier of Alberta and a deacon of the Strathcona Baptist Church.

In February 1910, Bowen moved to Brandon, Manitoba to serve as the registrar of Brandon College. After briefly returning to Edmonton in July to serve as the pastor of Strathcona Baptist Church, before moving to Winnipeg, Manitoba to serve as the paster at Broadway Church. He returned to Edmonton in 1914.

While living in Edmonton, he also got into the insurance business.

Bowen joined the Canadian Expeditionary Force in the First World War, serving as a military chaplain. After the war, he had an interest in politics and ran successfully for municipal office in 1919.

== Political career ==
=== Municipal ===
Bowen ran for a seat to Edmonton City Council for the first time in the 1919 Edmonton municipal election when five aldermanic seats were up for election. He came in fifth place in the polling to serve a two-year term on council as an alderman.

Bowen won election to the Alberta Legislature in the 1921 Alberta general election and decided not to run for re-election in the municipal election that year. He failed in his re-election bid in the 1926 Alberta general election when Edmonton seats were filled using the single transferable voting election system, and then returned to municipal politics by winning an aldermanic seat in the 1927 Edmonton municipal election held using the single transferable voting election system.

Bowen ran for mayor in the 1928 Edmonton municipal election after serving only one year of his two-year term as alderman. He was defeated by incumbent mayor Ambrose Bury in a close two-way race.

=== Provincial ===
Bowen was elected to the Alberta Legislature as a Liberal candidate in the electoral district of Edmonton in 1921. He won the second of five seats that were filled in a contest between 26 candidates, under the plurality block voting system. In his maiden speech to the legislature, Bowen brought attention to the need for increased government assistance for the unemployed and for adjustment to the taxation system to reduce the financial burdens facing urban centres.

In 1926 Bowen briefly held leadership of the Alberta Liberal Party and also became Leader of the Official Opposition in Alberta. Bowen ran for re-election in the 1926 Alberta general election but was not re-elected.

Bowen attempted a political comeback five years later. On December 19, 1930, he won the Liberal nomination for a by-election in the Edmonton electoral district on January 9, 1931. Bowen defeated Joseph Clarke for the right to stand as the Liberal candidate, at a convention attended by almost 200 delegates with a vote of 98 to 54. He was defeated in the election, coming in third place in the field of four candidates - Conservative candidate Frederick Jamieson won the seat.

=== Lieutenant governor ===
On March 23, 1937, following the sudden death in office of his predecessor, Philip Primrose, Governor General the Lord Tweedsmuir, on the advice of Prime Minister Mackenzie King appointed Bowen as the sixth lieutenant governor of Alberta.

One of Bowen's first acts as Lieutenant Governor on May 1, 1937, was an order in council regarding the "resignation or retirement" of William Chant, Minister of Agriculture, after Premier Aberhart requested Chant's resignation to implement a "more aggressive" Department of Agriculture. It was the second occasion in Alberta where a lieutenant governor removed a cabinet minister from office, after Charles W. Cross was removed as attorney general by Robert G. Brett in 1918.

A few weeks after taking office, Bowen became involved in a constitutional crisis when he refused to give royal assent to three government bills passed by the governing Social Credit Party government, which was accused of exceeding its constitutional powers. Two of the bills would have put the province's banks under the control of the provincial government, while a third, the Accurate News and Information Act, would have forced newspapers to hand over the names and addresses of their sources to the government, and to print government rebuttals to stories the provincial cabinet objected to.

Mindful of the federal government's disallowance of some of the Social Credit Board's and government's earlier legislation, Bowen reserved royal assent of the act and its companions until their legality could be tested at the Supreme Court of Canada as Reference Re Alberta Statutes. This was the first use of the power of reservation in Alberta, and was heavily criticized by the government and by some members of the public, who appeared at the door of Government House, threatening the governor and his family. The three bills were later declared unconstitutional by the Supreme Court of Canada and the Judicial Committee of the Privy Council. In 1938, Bowen threatened to dismiss Aberhart's government, which would have been an extraordinary use of his reserve powers. The Social Credit government remained immensely popular with the Albertans, however, so the threat was not carried out.

In the summer of 1938 Aberhart's government announced the elimination of Bowen's official residence, his government car, and his secretarial staff. Biographers attribute this action to retaliation by Aberhart. For a time, Bowen defiantly remained in Government House, despite the power, heat, and telephone service being cut off by the government. Eventually, however, after being forced to sign an order-in-council closing Government House, Bowen moved to a suite at the Hotel Macdonald. The building, the furniture, and fixtures were subsequently sold, and Bowen was the last lieutenant governor to officially reside at Government House. Bowen would eventually move into a home in Edmonton's Glenora neighbourhood.

In September 1938 Bowen insisted that an order in council regarding the establishment of credit houses and other Cabinet expenditure proposals be amended to remove the authority for unlimited expenditures, and instead have a limit of $200,000. Despite these strong disagreements with the government, Bowen was retained as lieutenant-governor until 1950.

During World War II, Bowen promoted the sale of war bonds and otherwise contributed to the war effort. Bowen visited military units posted in Alberta including elements of the United States Army posted in Edmonton and Whitehorse during the construction of the Alaska Highway. On July 2, 1943, Bowen hosted Alaska Territory Governor Ernest H. Gruening for a joint Dominion Day and Independence Day celebration in Edmonton.

Despite the earlier friction between him and the government, Bowen served almost 13 years as lieutenant-governor, resigning in 1950 due to ill health.

== Honours ==
John Bowen received an honorary doctorate of laws from the University of Alberta in 1939. Bowen also received the American Medal of Freedom Silver Palm in 1947 in recognition of his service to American forces stationed in Edmonton. Bowen was invested as a Knight of Grace in the Most Venerable Order of the Hospital of St. John of Jerusalem in 1949.

In 2002, the City of Edmonton named Bowen Wynd, a road, in his honour.

== Late life ==
Bowen died on January 2, 1957, in Edmonton, and was buried in the Edmonton Cemetery.
