= Alberta Order of Excellence =

Civilian honour for merit in Canada

- Insignia of the Alberta Order of Excellence

Awarded by the lieutenant governor of Alberta
- Type: Order of merit (provincial)
- Founded: 16 November 1979
- Eligibility: Canadian citizens living in Alberta
- Awarded for: Making a difference by serving Albertans with excellence and distinction
- Status: Currently constituted
- Founder: Frank Lynch-Staunton
- Chancellor: Salma Lakhani
- Grades: Member
- Post-nominals: AOE

Statistics
- Total inductees: 220

Precedence
- Next (higher): Order of British Columbia
- Next (lower): Order of Prince Edward Island
- Ribbon bar of the order

The Alberta Order of Excellence (Note: French: Ordre d'excellence de l'Alberta) is a civilian honour for merit in the Canadian province of Alberta. Instituted in 1979 when Lieutenant Governor Frank C. Lynch-Staunton granted royal assent to the Alberta Order of Excellence Act, the order is administered by the Governor-in-Council and is intended to honour current or former Alberta residents for conspicuous achievements in any field, being thus described as the highest honour amongst all others conferred by the Canadian Crown in right of Alberta.

== Structure and appointment ==
The Alberta Order of Excellence is intended to honour any current or former long-time resident of Alberta who has demonstrated a high level of individual excellence and achievement in any field, having "rendered service of the greatest distinction and of singular excellence for or on behalf of the residents of Alberta." Canadian citizenship is a requirement, and those who are elected or appointed members of a governmental body are ineligible as long as they hold office. Only 10 people may be inducted each year, though a nomination may remain up for consideration by the council for seven years.

The process of finding qualified individuals begins with submissions from the public to the Council of the Alberta Order of Excellence, which consists of six individuals without prequalification appointed by the lieutenant governor and meets once yearly to make its selected recommendations to the viceroy each June; posthumous nominations are not accepted. The lieutenant governor, who is ex officio a member and the Chancellor of the Alberta Order of Excellence and remains a member following his or her departure from viceregal office, then makes all appointments into the fellowship's single grade of membership by letters patent bearing the viceroyal sign-manual and the Great Seal of the province. Thereafter, the new members are entitled to use the post-nominal letters AOE and have their portrait added to two galleries, one each at the Northern Alberta Jubilee Auditorium and Southern Alberta Jubilee Auditorium.

== Insignia ==
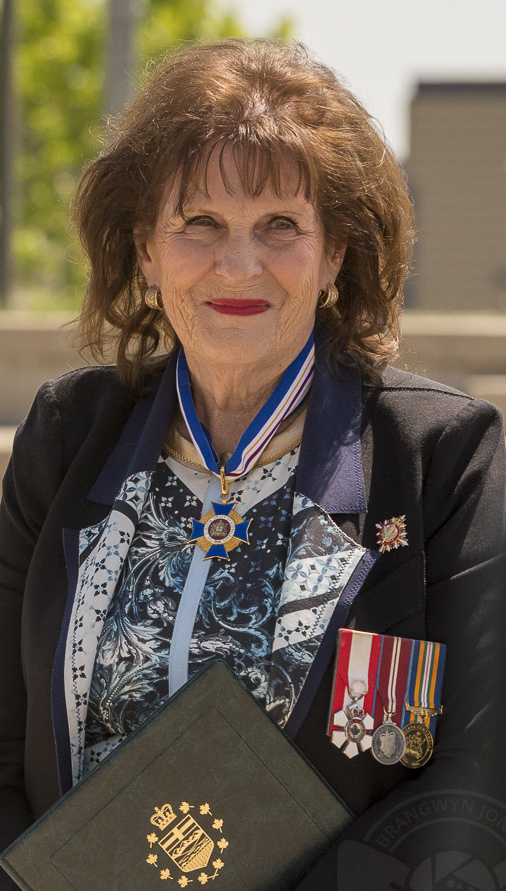
Lois Mitchell wearing the insignia of the order as a necklet in 2019

Upon admission into the Alberta Order of Excellence, in a ceremony held at Government House in Edmonton, members are presented with the order's insignia. According to Insignia Regulation, which stipulates the design of the order's badges and ribbon and how they are worn, the main emblem of the order is a 51-millimetre-wide (2.0 in) gold medallion in the form of a cross pattée, with the equidistant arms consisting of a transparent blue enamel over gold patterned to resemble prairie wheat. This cross is layered between a burnished gold disk bearing roses and rose leaves, and another roundel with the coat of arms of Alberta on a red enamel background, surrounded by a white circle bearing the words "The Alberta Order of Excellence". On the reverse is a maple leaf supported by a sheaf of wheat. The ribbon is patterned with vertical stripes in blue, burgundy, white, and gold, reflecting the colours within the provincial coat of arms; men wear the medallion suspended from this ribbon at the collar, while women carry theirs on a ribbon bow at the left chest. Members also receive a lapel pin for wear on casual clothing.

== See also ==
- Symbols of Alberta
- Orders, decorations, and medals of the Canadian provinces
- Canadian honours order of wearing
