= Government House (Alberta) =

Former official residence of the lieutenant governor of Alberta

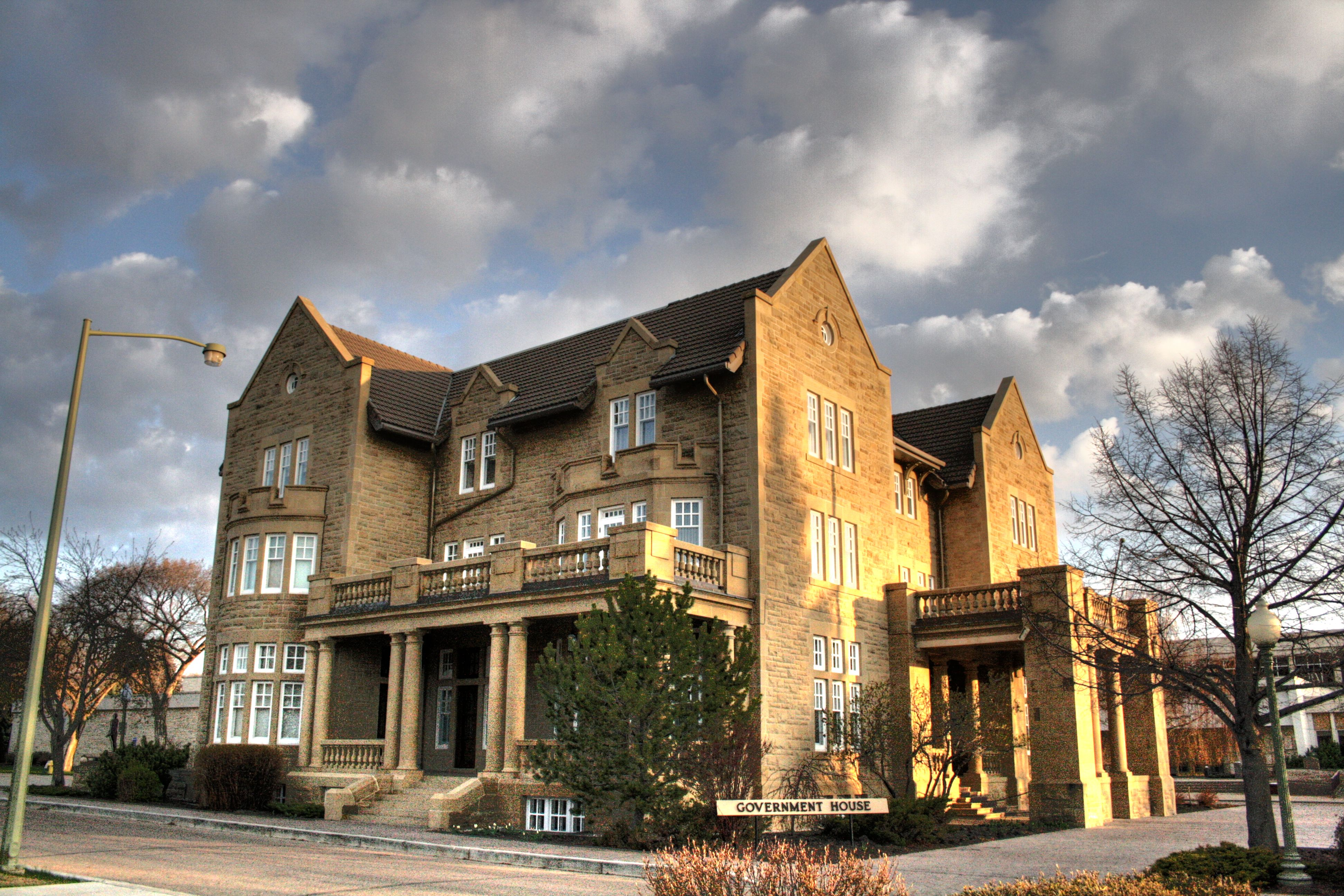
- Main façade of Government House
- Interactive map of the Government House area

General information
- Type: House / Conference Centre
- Architectural style: Edwardian Tudor revival / Jacobethan
- Location: 12845 102 Avenue, Edmonton, Alberta, Canada
- Coordinates: 53.541579°N 113.544039°W
- Current tenants: Government of Alberta
- Construction started: 1912
- Inaugurated: 1913
- Cost: $345,882
- Client: The King in Right of Alberta (Edward VII)
- Owner: The King in Right of Alberta (Charles III)

Height
- Top floor: 3rd

Technical details
- Structural system: Steel framing and load-bearing masonry
- Floor count: 4

Design and construction
- Architect: Allan Merrick Jeffers

National Historic Site of Canada
- Official name: Government House, Edmonton, Alberta
- Designated: June 26, 2012

Alberta Historic Resources Act
- Official name: Government House
- Designated: June 7, 1985

Government House is the former official residence of the lieutenant governors of Alberta. Located in Edmonton's Glenora neighbourhood, since 1964 the restored and repurposed building has been used by the Alberta provincial government for ceremonial events, conferences, and some official meetings of the caucus.

The City of Edmonton maintains the Government House Park, part of the North Saskatchewan River valley parks system, in the river valley directly below the Government House clifftop location. Government House is about a 4-kilometre (2.5 mi) walk from the Alberta Legislature Building, northwest along the banks of the North Saskatchewan River.

The Royal Alberta Museum was housed in a separate building on the same property from 1967 until 2018.

== Official viceregal residence (1913–1938) ==
The property for the house, with a large surrounding area, was purchased by the Province of Alberta in 1910. Construction on the building, intended from the outset to house the lieutenant governor, began in 1912.

The home, designed by America architect Allan Merrick Jeffers, is built in the Jacobean Revival style. The three-storey building featured a reception hall, drawing room, dining room, and music room on the first floor. The second floor house bedrooms for the Lieutenant Governor and guests, while the third floor was reserved for servants quarters. Jeffers original design included a ballroom wing on the first floor, although this was removed because then Lieutenant Governor George H. V. Bulyea did not approve of dancing. The home was completed in 1913, with the official opening being held on October 7, 1913.

It was used as the viceregal residence until 1938. When it was closed, the Alberta Government cited economic concerns, as well as the closing of the Ontario Government House the year previous, as reasons for the closure. However, the closure also came soon after Lieutenant Governor John C. Bowen refused to grant royal assent to three controversial bills passed through the Legislative Assembly, and was, along with the removal of his support staff and official car, seen as an act of retaliation by Premier William Aberhart. The building was sold, and the furniture and fixtures were sold.

== General use (1938–1964) ==
The building was used a boarding house for American pilots flying supplies up to the Alaska Highway and then was acquired by the federal government as military hospital during the Second World War. After the war the building was used as convalescent home for veterans. The house and grounds were returned to the provincial Crown in 1964.

== Government House (1964 onwards) ==
When the building was returned to the provincial Crown, the Government of Alberta extensively restored and reopened as conference centre for government use. The grounds were also chosen as the site of the new Alberta Provincial Museum, which was built as a Canadian Centennial project by the Canadian and Alberta governments and opened in 1967 to celebrate Canada's 100th anniversary of Confederation. The museum was renamed the Royal Alberta Museum in 2005, an honour from Queen Elizabeth II, who visited Alberta that year as part of the province's celebration of its own 100th anniversary as a province.

Government House has since hosted many important functions, including visits by Pope John-Paul II and by Queen Elizabeth II and other members of the Canadian Royal Family. Visiting foreign dignitaries are greeted at the ceremonial porte-cochere. These dignitaries, including the Royal Family, reside at a hotel, normally the Hotel Macdonald, when visiting the provincial capital.

Government House has reception rooms, conference rooms and support facilities. While it is no longer the viceregal residence, it is here that the lieutenant governor presides over swearing-in ceremonies for Cabinet ministers. Every Thursday while the legislature is in session, the caucus of the governing party meets in the Alberta Room, a 100-seat conference room on the top floor.

When not in use for official purposes, members of the public can take tours of the building at no cost. On display are artifacts and original pieces of furniture from the building's time as a residence and information is also provided about the building's restoration and current functions.

== Alberta Viceregal residences (1938–2005) ==
From 1938 until 2005, Alberta owned and operated an official residence, a separate office, and provided an entertaining venue for the viceroy. The lieutenant governor lived in a Crown-owned house in the Glenora district of Edmonton (a single storey bungalow at 58 St Georges Crescent), while holding an office at the Legislature Building, where royal assent is granted and where the lieutenant governor received the premier.

The house in Glenora was demolished in 2005 and lieutenant governors have since lived in a nearby house.

=== New official residence ===
A new Royal Alberta Museum was built in Downtown Edmonton and opened in 2018.

Then-Premier Stelmach and the Alberta government stated in 2011 that the site of the old museum, on the grounds of Government House, would be used to build a new official residence for the lieutenant governor. These plans have not come to fruition.

== See also ==
- Government Houses of Canada
- Government Houses of the British Empire
- Monarchy in Alberta
- Lieutenant Governor of Alberta
- List of lieutenant governors of Alberta
