= Salma Lakhani =

Lieutenant Governor of Alberta since 2020

Her Honour the Honourable Salma Lakhani AOE
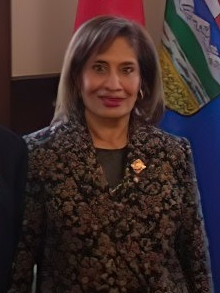
- Lakhani in 2020

19th Lieutenant Governor of Alberta
- Incumbent
- Assumed office August 26, 2020
- Monarchs: Elizabeth II; Charles III
- Governors General: Julie Payette; Mary Simon; Louise Arbour
- Premier: Jason Kenney; Danielle Smith
- Preceded by: Lois Mitchell

Personal details
- Born: Salmabegum Rajabali; 1951 or 1952 (age 73–74) Kampala, Protectorate of Uganda
- Spouse: Zaheer Lakhani
- Children: 2
- Education: University of Manchester

Salmabegum Lakhani AOE (née Rajabali, born 1951 or 1952) is the 19th lieutenant governor of Alberta. Her appointment as lieutenant governor became effective upon the swearing of the oath of allegiance and oath of office on August 26, 2020.

She is the viceregal representative of King Charles III of Canada in the province of Alberta. Lakhani is the first South Asian and the first Muslim to hold a viceregal office in Canada.

== Personal life and early career ==
Lakhani was born in Kampala, Uganda, the daughter of Abdul and Malek Rajabali, into an Ismaili Muslim family from Gujarat, India. She attended an Aga Khan School during her childhood. In fall 1971, Lakhani started university in the United Kingdom at Manchester University. In August 1972 while Lakhani was back home on summer holidays, the Ugandan President, Idi Amin, began a set of policies that included the expropriation of properties owned by Indians in Uganda. Lakhani returned to the United Kingdom quickly after the announcement of these policies. However, as her family's assets had been expropriated, she was unable to pay her tuition and living expenses. The British government waived these fees for many Ugandans, including Lakhani and her future husband, Zaheer Lakhani, who studied at the University of Leeds.

Lakhani continued her studies at Manchester University, completing a Bachelor of Science with Honours in Clinical Biochemistry.

In June 1977, Lakhani's husband received a medical residency position from the University of Alberta in Edmonton. The Lakhanis were stateless, so the couple travelled on British travel documents and originally intended to stay for two years.

The Lakhanis stayed in Alberta beyond their original two-year plan. Zaheer became a cardiologist while Salma helped manage his practice and opened a business focused on early childhood education. Salma became involved in the Edmonton community, becoming one of the first mentors in NorQuest College's Youth in Transition program, a founding member of the college's 1000Women: A Million Possibilities movement, serving on the board of the John Humphrey Centre for Peace and Human Rights, and volunteering with Lois Hole Hospital for Women, Kids Kottage, Sorrentino's Compassion House, the Alberta Cancer Board, the Zebra Foundation and Aga Khan Foundation Canada.

In the 1990s, Zaheer helped establish cardiac services at a hospital in Dar es Salaam, Tanzania, while Salma volunteered at two of the city's schools and with local women's charity groups.

For her service, Lakhani received the Alberta Centennial and Queen's Diamond Jubilee medals.

== Honours and awards ==
Ribbon	Description	Post-nominal letters	Notes
	Dames of Justice or Grace	DStJ	
	Alberta Order of Excellence	AOE	
	Queen Elizabeth II Diamond Jubilee Medal		Canadian version
	Alberta Centennial Medal		
	Queen Elizabeth II Platinum Jubilee Medal		Alberta version
	King Charles III Coronation Medal		Canadian version

== Viceregal post ==
Lakhani was appointed Lieutenant Governor by Governor General Julie Payette on the advice of Prime Minister Justin Trudeau.

Upon becoming lieutenant governor, she also was inducted to the Alberta Order of Excellence and was made its chancellor. Lakhani is vice-prior of the St. John Council for Alberta and a dame of the Order of Saint John.

In September 2022, during the leadership election of the governing United Conservative Party, Lakhani told the media she would have to seek legal advice before giving royal assent to a controversial Alberta Sovereignty Act proposed by UCP leadership candidate Danielle Smith. Though Lakhani acknowledged that her role is viewed as mostly ceremonial, she emphasized her belief in "do[ing] the right thing for our people and for our Constitution".

== Arms ==
Coat of arms of Salma Lakhani

Notes
Lakhani was granted armorial bearings by the Canadian Heraldic Authority in May 2023. The elements of the achievement were chosen to reflect Lakhani's upbringing and career in Uganda and Canada.
Adopted
May 15, 2023
Crest
"A pronghorn lodged guardant proper gorged of a ribbon sable pendent therefrom a heart gules"
Escutcheon
"Gyronny arrondi of four gules and or, a pellet charged with a wild rose proper"
Supporters
"Two grey crowned cranes standing on a rocky mount charged with Stargazer lilies and wild roses in front of snowy mountains proper"
Motto
Ubuntu (Bantu languages for 'I am because we are')
Orders
Order of Saint John, Alberta Order of Excellence

Order of precedence
Preceded by Bernadette McIntyre as Lieutenant Governor of Saskatchewan	Order of Precedence of Canada as Lieutenant Governor of Alberta	Succeeded by Joan Marie Aylward as Lieutenant Governor of Newfoundland and Labrador
