= Premier of Alberta =

Head of government of Alberta

- Incumbent; Danielle Smith since October 11, 2022
- Office of the Premier
- Style: The Honourable (formal); Premier (informal)
- Status: Head of Government
- Member of: Legislative Assembly; Executive Council
- Reports to: Legislative Assembly; Lieutenant Governor
- Seat: Edmonton
- Appointer: Lieutenant Governor of Alberta; with the confidence of the Alberta Legislature
- Term length: At His Majesty's pleasure; contingent on the premier's ability to command confidence in the legislative assembly
- Formation: September 2, 1905
- First holder: Alexander Cameron Rutherford
- Deputy: Deputy Premier of Alberta
- Website: www.alberta.ca/premier.aspx

The premier of Alberta is the head of government and first minister of the Canadian province of Alberta. The current premier is Danielle Smith, leader of the governing United Conservative Party, who was sworn in on October 11, 2022.

The premier of Alberta is the leader of the legislative majority in the Alberta Legislature. The premier selects ministers of the Crown to the Executive Council of Alberta (the "cabinet") and as such is the head of the government in Alberta. The premier is the first minister representing Alberta towards the federal government and the other provinces and territories in Canada.

By constitutional convention the premier is normally a Member of the Legislative Assembly (MLA).

== Duties and functions ==
To be effective, accountable and in line with custom, the premier is expected to hold a seat in the legislature, so the premier serves as the MLA for a riding and is elected as MLA by the constituents of that constituency. As with most government leaders in a parliamentary system, the premier usually wins their own election as MLA easily. However, on occasion, a premier has not been re-elected to their seat in a general election, forcing them to run in a by-election in a constituency that comes empty by the resignation of the sitting MLA or other incident. The most recent case of this was Don Getty, who lost his Edmonton-Whitemud seat in the 1989 election and then ran and was elected in a by-election in Stettler. In 2022 Danielle Smith was elected party leader without holding a seat in the legislative assembly, thus becoming premier, and within a few weeks won a seat in a by-election.

== List of premiers ==
Order of precedence
Preceded by Salma Lakhani, Lieutenant Governor of Alberta	Order of precedence in Alberta as of June 2024	Succeeded by Ritu Khullar, Chief Justice of the Court of Appeal of Alberta
Preceded by Scott Moe, Premier of Saskatchewan	Order of precedence in Canada as of June 2024	Succeeded by Andrew Furey, Premier of Newfoundland and Labrador
