= Lieutenant Governor of Alberta =

Representative of the Canadian monarch in Alberta

- Emblem of the lieutenant governor

- Flag of the lieutenant governor

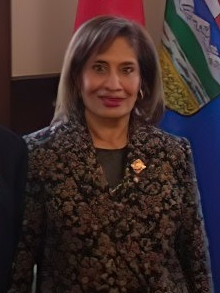
- Incumbent; Salma Lakhani since 26 August 2020
- Viceroy
- Seat: Edmonton, Alberta
- Appointer: The governor general on the advice of the prime minister
- Term length: At the governor general's pleasure
- Formation: 1 September 1905
- First holder: George H. V. Bulyea
- Website: lieutenantgovernor.ab.ca

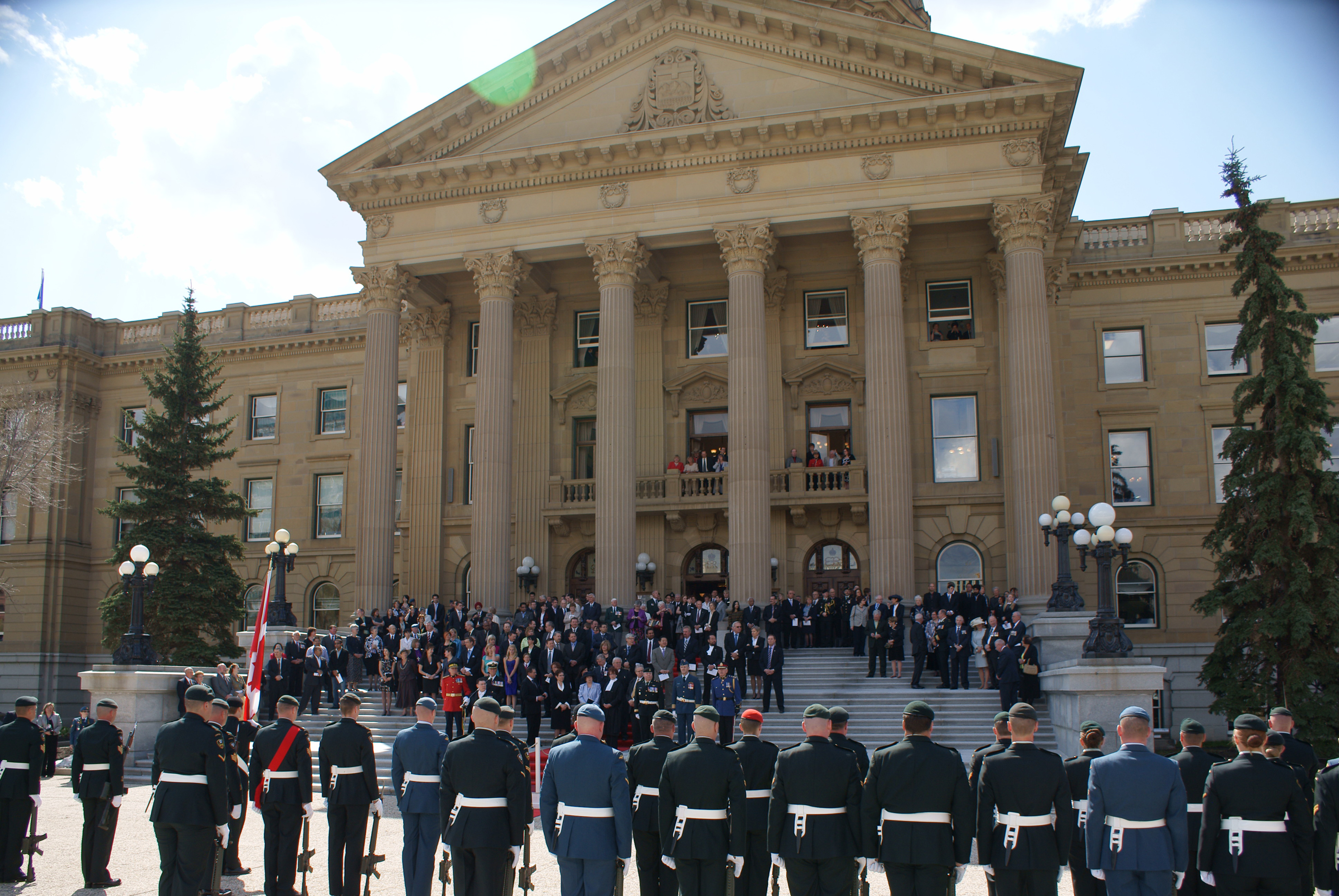
The swearing-in ceremony of Donald Ethell as Lieutenant Governor of Alberta, 11 May 2010

The lieutenant governor of Alberta (/lɛfˈtɛnənt/) is the representative in Alberta of the monarch. The lieutenant governor is appointed in the same manner as the other provincial viceroys in Canada and is similarly tasked with carrying out most of the monarch's constitutional and ceremonial duties.

Salma Lakhani is the current lieutenant governor. On 26 August 2020, she was installed as the 19th lieutenant governor, becoming the first South Asian and Muslim in Canadian history to hold the role.

== Role and presence ==
The lieutenant governor is vested with a number of governmental duties and is also expected to undertake various ceremonial roles. The lieutenant governor, who is the Chancellor and a member of the Alberta Order of Excellence, inducts deserving individuals into the order. Upon appointment, the lieutenant governor automatically becomes a Knight or Dame of Justice and the Vice-Prior in Alberta of the Most Venerable Order of the Hospital of Saint John of Jerusalem. The viceroy further presents other provincial honours and decorations, as well as various awards that are named for and presented by the lieutenant governor; these are generally created in partnership with another government or charitable organization and linked specifically to their cause. These honours are presented at official ceremonies, which count amongst hundreds of other engagements the lieutenant governor partakes in each year, either as host or guest of honour; in 2006, the lieutenant governor undertook 328 engagements and 280 in 2007.

At these events, the lieutenant governor's presence is marked by the lieutenant governor's standard, consisting of a blue field bearing the escutcheon of the Arms of His Majesty in Right of Alberta surmounted by a crown and surrounded by ten gold maple leaves, symbolizing the ten provinces of Canada. Within Alberta, the lieutenant governor also follows only the sovereign in the province's order of precedence, preceding even other members of the Canadian royal family and the Governor General of Canada.

== History ==
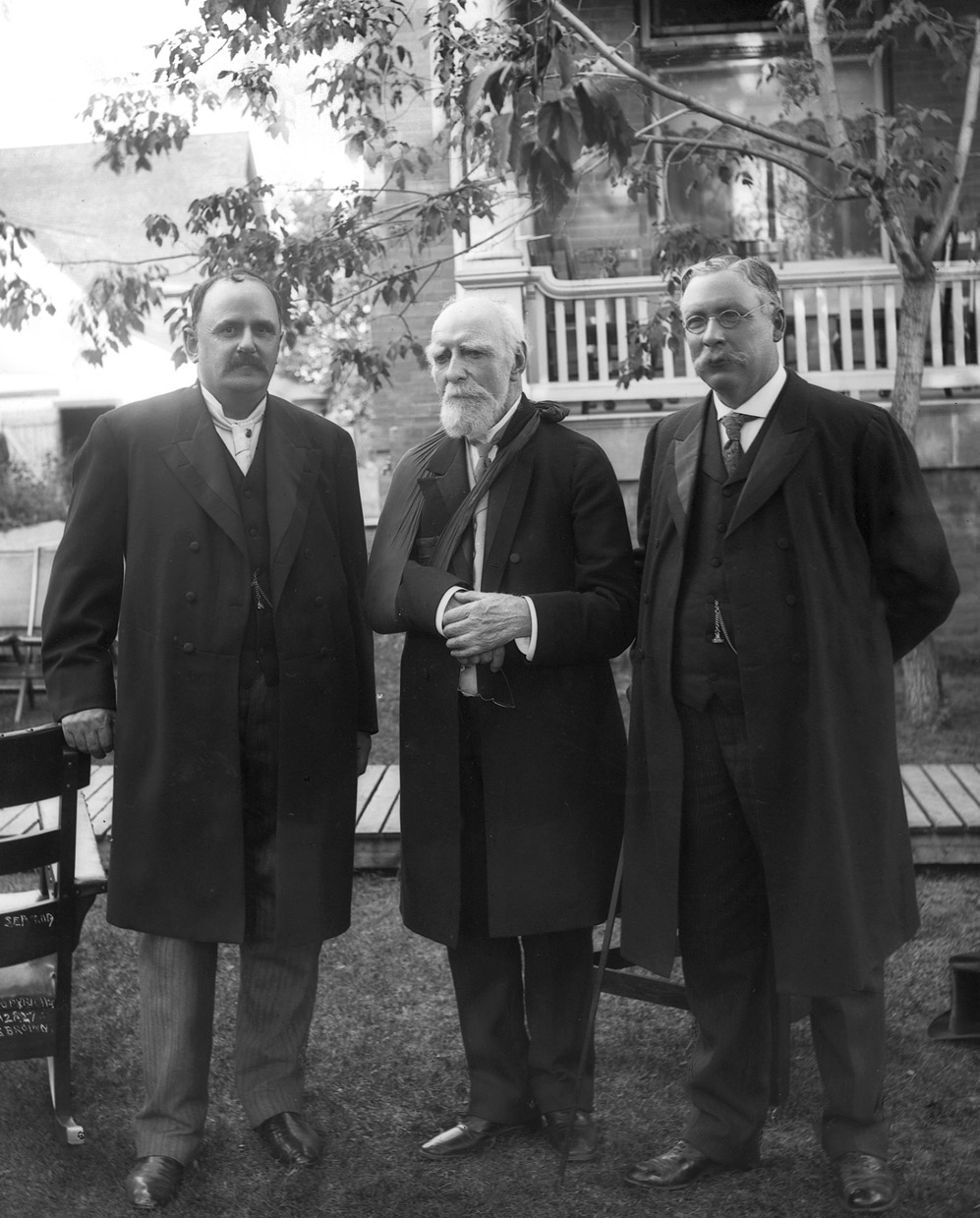
Alberta's first Lieutenant Governor, George H. V. Bulyea (left), at Government House with the Lord Strathcona and Mount Royal (centre) and Alexander Cameron Rutherford (right), 7 September 1909

Standard of the lieutenant governor from 1907 to 1981

The office of lieutenant governor of Alberta came into being in 1905, upon Alberta's entry into Canadian Confederation, and evolved from the earlier position of lieutenant governor of the North-West Territories. Since that date, 19 lieutenant governors have served the province, amongst whom were notable firsts, such as Norman Kwong—the first Asian-Canadian lieutenant governor of Alberta—and Helen Hunley—the first female lieutenant governor of the province. The shortest mandate by a lieutenant governor of Alberta was Philip Primrose, from 1 October 1936 to his death on 17 March 1937, while the longest was John C. Bowen, from 23 March 1937 to 1 February 1950. In 1956, following his appointment, Lieutenant Governor John J. Bowlen became the first provincial viceroy in Canada to be granted an audience with the Canadian monarch, starting a tradition that continues today for all of Canada's lieutenant governors.

One of the few examples in Canada of a viceroy exercising the royal prerogative against or without ministerial advice came in 1937, when John Bowen reserved royal assent to three bills passed through the legislative assembly; two of the bills would have put the province's banks under the control of the provincial government, while a third, the Accurate News and Information Act, would have forced newspapers to print Cabinet rebuttals to stories the ministers objected to. All three bills were later declared unconstitutional by the Supreme Court of Canada and the Judicial Committee of the Privy Council, though, in retaliation for this move by Bowen, his premier, William Aberhart, closed Government House (the viceregal residence), removed the lieutenant governor's secretary and support offices, and took away his official car. Nearly seven decades later, Lois Hole, lieutenant governor from 2000 until her death in 2005, publicly stated that she wished to discuss with her premier, Ralph Klein, the proposed Bill 11, which was meant to allow private health care to compete with the public health care system. From this it was suspected that Hole might reserve royal assent to the bill; however, Hole eventually did allow the bill to pass.

== Residence ==
The lieutenant governor no longer has a home provided as a residence during his or her term.

From 1913 to 1938, the title holder resided at Government House and from 1966 to 2004 at 58 St. George's Crescent in Glenora. The former home is now Alberta Government Conference Centre, and the latter was demolished in 2005.

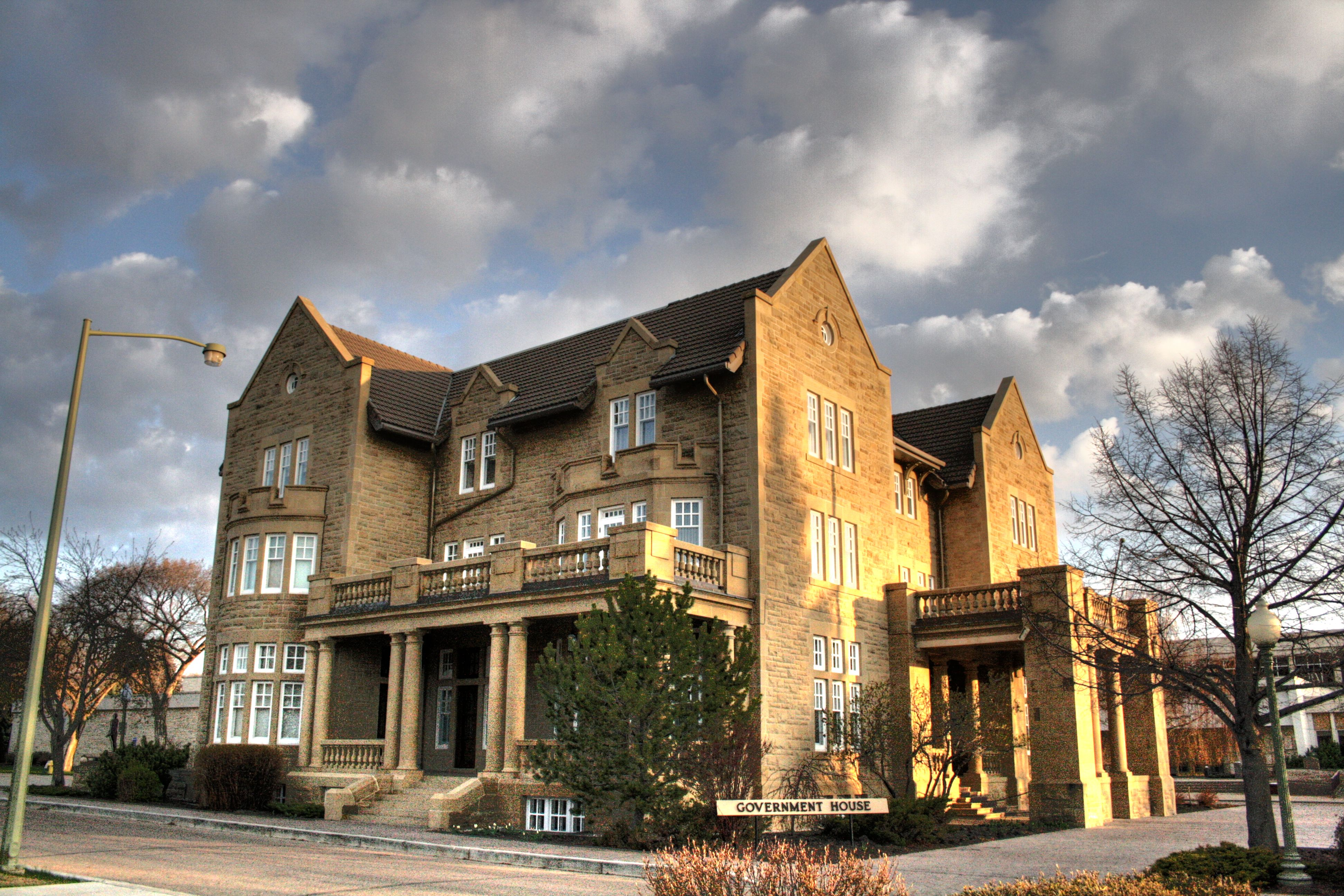
In the past Government House was the residence of lieutenant governor.

A residence was built for Lieutenant Governor John J. Bowlen, in which he lived from 1950 to 1959, at 13604 Ravine Drive.

== Federal expenses ==
The federal expenses of the lieutenant governor in the exercise of her official duties for fiscal year 2022–23 were:

- Travel and accommodation: $38,437
- Hospitality: $86,796
- Operational and administrative expenses: $2,087
- Total: $127,321

== See also ==
- Monarchy in the Canadian provinces
- Government of Alberta

== Bibliography ==
- Munro, Kenneth (2005). The Maple Crown in Alberta: The Office of Lieutenant Governor. Victoria: Trafford. ISBN 1-4120-5317-X.

Order of precedence
| Preceded by King Charles III, King of Canada | Order of precedence in Alberta as of 2015 | Succeeded by Danielle Smith, Premier of Alberta |
