= Section 96 of the Constitution Act, 1867 =

Provision of the Constitution of Canada

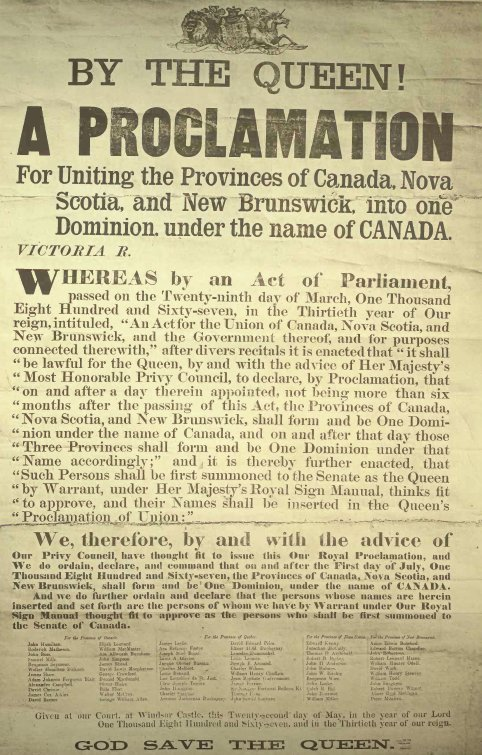
Proclamation bringing the Constitution Act into force, July 1, 1867

Section 96 of the Constitution Act, 1867 (French: article 96 de la Loi constitutionnelle de 1867) is a provision of the Constitution of Canada relating to the appointment of judges of the provincial superior, district and county courts. It provides that the judges of those courts are appointed by the Governor General of Canada. By constitutional convention, the Governor General exercises that power on the advice of the federal Cabinet

The Constitution Act, 1867 is the constitutional statute which established Canada. Originally named the British North America Act, 1867, the Act continues to be the foundational statute for the Constitution of Canada, although it has been amended many times since 1867. It is now recognised as part of the supreme law of Canada.

== Constitution Act, 1867 ==
The Constitution Act, 1867 is part of the Constitution of Canada and thus part of the supreme law of Canada. It was the product of extensive negotiations by the governments of the British North American provinces in the 1860s. The Act sets out the constitutional framework of Canada, including the structure of the federal government and the powers of the federal government and the provinces. Originally enacted in 1867 by the British Parliament under the name the British North America Act, 1867, in 1982 the Act was brought under full Canadian control through the Patriation of the Constitution, and renamed the Constitution Act, 1867. Since Patriation the Act can only be amended in Canada, under the amending formula set out in the Constitution Act, 1982.

== Text of section 96 ==
Section 96 reads:

Appointment of Judges
96. The Governor General shall appoint the Judges of the Superior, District, and County Courts in each Province, except those of the Courts of Probate in Nova Scotia and New Brunswick.

Section 96 is found in Part VII of the Constitution Act, 1867, dealing with the judicature. The section has not been amended since it was first enacted.

== Operation ==
Section 96 gives the Governor General the power to appoint the judges of the provincial superior, county and district courts. Under the principles of responsible government, the Governor General acts on the advice of the federal Cabinet in exercising that power. Although in form an appointing power, it has been given an expansive interpretation by the courts to protect a core of jurisdiction in the provincial superior courts, particularly over constitutional issues, and judicial review of administrative tribunals.

== Purpose and interpretation ==
=== Guarantee of provincial superior court jurisdiction ===
Although section 96 deals with appointment of judges, it has been interpreted as a restriction on the jurisdiction which can be conferred on courts which are not superior, county or district courts. The argument is that if the Constitution intends that the federal government has the power to appoint those judges, the appointing power would be circumvented if governments could assign the jurisdiction of those courts to other courts or agencies whose judges are not appointed by the federal government.

=== Adjudication of constitutional issues ===
The Supreme Court has held that section 96 confers a certain core of jurisdiction on the provincial superior courts, which cannot be taken away by either Parliament or the provincial legislatures. One of the most important of these is the jurisdiction to determine constitutional issues. The provincial superior courts have the authority to determine constitutional issues, and that power is constitutionally entrenched. The federal Parliament can create federal courts under section 101 of the Act, and give them jurisdiction to consider constitutional issues, but that jurisdiction cannot be exclusive. The grant of jurisdiction to the federal courts cannot eliminate the jurisdiction of the provincial superior courts to determine constitutional issues.

=== Provincial courts ===
In one of the first cases that dealt with the jurisdiction of provincial courts, Reference re Adoption Act, the Supreme Court confirmed that the provinces could not assign jurisdiction away from the superior courts to courts where the judges were appointed by the provinces. However, the Court held that the statutes in question dealt with matters which had not been in the exclusive jurisdiction of the superior, district and county courts at Confederation, and therefore those subjects could be assigned to provincially appointed judges.

The Supreme Court has held that the monetary jurisdiction of provincial small claims courts is not frozen in time as of Confederation in 1867. The provinces can increase the monetary jurisdiction to recognise the effects of inflation. However, the Court has held that increases in monetary jurisdiction and related procedural changes cannot be so great as to turn the provincial court into a parallel court to the provincial superior court. A parallel civil jurisdiction infringes section 96.

=== Administrative agencies ===
The issue also arose in the case of administrative tribunals: could provinces create administrative tribunals, such as labour relations boards, and give them powers similar to those of a court? In 1948, the Judicial Committee of the Privy Council (at that time the highest court of appeal in the British Empire) held that provincial legislatures could give administrative agencies some powers similar to that of courts, provided the overall function of the administrative agency was sufficiently different from that of a court. The Judicial Committee held that the Labour Relation Board of Saskatchewan met this test, and therefore the Legislature could give it powers similar to that of a court to enforce its decisions, without infringing section 96.

The Supreme Court provided much more detailed guidance in the Residential Tenancies Reference, creating a three-step test to analyse whether a grant of ancillary judicial powers was consistent with section 96:

(1) Is the power in issue identical or analogous to powers exercised by the "Superior, District, and County Courts" at the time Canada was created in 1867? If not, the power can be conferred on a provincial tribunal.
(2) If the power was analogous to court powers, was it being exercised as a “judicial power”? If not, the power could be conferred on a provincial tribunal.
(3) If the first two steps did not decide the issue, it is necessary to review the tribunal's function as a whole, in its institutional setting of the administrative tribunal. A provincial scheme is only invalid where the adjudicative function is a sole or central function of the tribunal.

== Related provisions ==
Section 92(14) of the Act gives the provincial legislatures the power to create provincial courts and to assign jurisdiction to them, as well as determine the rules of civil procedure in those courts.

Section 97 of the Act provides that the judges of the courts of Ontario, Nova Scotia and New Brunswick must be appointed from the bars of those provinces.

Section 98 of the Act provides that the judges of the courts of Quebec must be appointed from the bar of that province.

Section 99 of the Act provides security of tenure for the judges, who can only be removed by joint address of the Senate and the House of Commons.

Section 100 of the Act provides that the judges are to be paid by the federal government.

Section 101 of the Act provides that the federal Parliament can create federal courts.

== See also ==
Court system of Canada
