= List of Canadian courts of appeal =

List of final courts of appeal in Canada. For details on the court system, see Canadian court system.

== Canada ==
Supreme Court of Canada

=== Federal courts ===
Federal Court of Appeal

Court Martial Appeal Court of Canada

=== Alberta ===
Alberta Court of Appeal

=== British Columbia ===
Court of Appeal for British Columbia

=== Manitoba ===
Manitoba Court of Appeal

=== New Brunswick ===
Court of Appeal of New Brunswick

=== Newfoundland and Labrador ===
Court of Appeal of Newfoundland and Labrador

=== Northwest Territories ===
Court of Appeal for the Northwest Territories

=== Nova Scotia ===
Nova Scotia Court of Appeal

=== Nunavut ===
Court of Appeal of Nunavut

=== Ontario ===
Court of Appeal for Ontario

=== Prince Edward Island ===
Court of Appeal of Prince Edward Island

=== Quebec ===
Cour d'appel du Québec

=== Saskatchewan ===
Court of Appeal for Saskatchewan

=== Yukon ===
Court of Appeal of Yukon

== See also ==
- State supreme court, for equivalent appellate courts within various American states
- United States courts of appeals, for equivalent courts at the federal government level in that country
