= Ritu Khullar =

Canadian jurist (1964–2026)

The Honourable Ritu Khullar KC
- Khullar in 2018

Chief Justice of Alberta
- In office November 28, 2022 – September 3, 2026 (Note: On medical leave from January 7, 2026, until September 3, 2026.)
- Nominated by: Justin Trudeau
- Preceded by: Catherine Fraser
- Succeeded by: Dawn Pentelechuk (acting)

Chief Justice of the Court of Appeal for the Northwest Territories
- In office November 28, 2022 – September 3, 2026
- Preceded by: Catherine Fraser
- Succeeded by: Dawn Pentelechuk (acting)

Chief Justice of the Nunavut Court of Appeal
- In office November 28, 2022 – September 3, 2026
- Preceded by: Catherine Fraser
- Succeeded by: Dawn Pentelechuk (acting)

Personal details
- Born: May 7, 1964 Fort Vermilion, Alberta, Canada
- Died: September 3, 2026 (aged 62)
- Education: University of Alberta (BA); University of Toronto (LLB)
- Occupation: Judge

Ritu Khullar (May 7, 1964 – September 3, 2026) was a Canadian jurist who served as the Chief Justice of Alberta, the Court of Appeal for the Northwest Territories, and the Nunavut Court of Appeal. She was appointed on November 28, 2022, and sworn in on February 23, 2023. Prior to the Court of Appeal, Khullar was appointed to the Court of King's Bench of Alberta in 2017.

The first woman of South Asian descent to be appointed a provincial chief justice in Canada, Khullar was a prominent labour, human rights, administrative and constitutional lawyer before becoming a judge and was part of landmark Supreme Court of Canada cases such as Vriend v Alberta and R v Ewanchuk.

== Early life and education ==
Khullar was born in Fort Vermilion, Alberta on May 7, 1964, to teachers who emigrated from India, and was raised in the rural communities of La Crete and Morinville. She also lived in Jamaica from 1969 to 1972. She attended Old Scona Academic High School in Edmonton, graduating in 1981. Her mother's family is Sikh and her father's is Hindu, and are of Punjabi descent.

She received a Bachelor of Arts in Political Science, graduating magna cum laude from the University of Alberta in 1985, and a Bachelor of Laws from the University of Toronto Faculty of Law in 1991, and was admitted to the Bar of Alberta in 1992.

== Career ==
=== Legal career ===
After law school, Khullar served as law clerk to the Alberta Court of Appeal and Queen's Bench from 1991 to 1992, after which she worked as an associate at Milner Fennerty and another Edmonton based firm.

Khullar was an associate and then a partner with Chivers Carpenter Lawyers from 2002 to 2009 and then managing partner from 2009 to 2017. According to the firm, "her practice was focused on litigation relating to public law issues including labour and employment, privacy, administrative, human rights, and constitutional law." She also represented public and private sector unions.

She also appeared in front of numerous administrative trials and every level of court in Canada, including the Supreme Court of Canada where she acted as counsel for the intervener for United Nurses of Alberta in Saskatchewan Federation of Labour v Saskatchewan, successfully arguing the right to strike is protected by the Charter under freedom of association. She all acted pro bono at the Supreme Court for the Women's Legal Education and Action Fund in landmark cases Vriend v Alberta and R v Ewanchuk. Vriend led to the inclusion of sexual orientation as a protected right under the Alberta Individual Rights Protection Act and Ewanchuk led to the Supreme Court of Canada ruling that the defense of implied consent is not valid in sexual assault cases, emphasizing the necessity of clear and affirmative consent.

As a lawyer, she was appointed Queen's Counsel in 2014. Khullar was appointed to the Court of Queen's Bench of Alberta as a judge in 2017. In March 2018, Attorney General of Canada Jody Wilson-Raybould announced Khullar's elevation to the Court of Appeal.

Khullar also taught labour, constitutional, and administrative law for fourteen years at the University of Alberta, Faculty of Law, alongside various seminars on privacy and labour arbitration.

=== Chief Justice of Alberta ===
On November 28, 2022, Prime Minister Justin Trudeau announced Khullar's appointment as Chief Justice of the Court of Appeal, replacing then Chief Justice Catherine Fraser. This made Khullar the first woman of South Asian descent to be appointed a provincial chief justice in Canada and the second woman in Alberta after her predecessor. Regarding her elevation to the role, she commented, "the opportunity to serve the people of Alberta, the Northwest Territories and Nunavut in this way is an enormous privilege and responsibility to which I am wholly committed."

On her appointment, Trudeau wished her success and said:

She is a respected member of the legal community and brings a wealth of experience in multiple areas of law to the bench. I am confident Chief Justice Khullar will be a great asset to the people of Alberta, the Northwest Territories, and Nunavut.

As Chief Justice, Khullar worked on modernizing Alberta's court system to address delays and improve efficiency. This included allowing more remote appearances and using technology in jury selection. A major challenge she faced is the backlog of cases, which has been a widespread issue in Canada. A 2023 report from The Advocates Society highlighted that in Alberta, it often takes over nine months to hear short applications and up to two to three years to schedule longer trials. Additionally, 22 criminal cases in Alberta were delayed by more than 30 months, putting them at risk of being dismissed due to unreasonable delay, as established in the R v Jordan (2016) decision.

On January 7, 2026, the Court of Appeal announced that Khullar had taken a medical leave after surgery, with Dawn Pentelechuk taking over as the Acting Chief Justice of Alberta during her absence.

== Personal life and death ==
Khullar was married to Rob Reynolds, KC, a constitutional lawyer and former Clerk of the Legislative Assembly of Alberta, with whom she had two sons.

Khullar died from cancer on September 3, 2026, at the age of 62.

== Awards ==
- 2020 Lifetime Achievement Award (Women in Law Leadership Awards)
- 2023 Canadian Inspiration Awards (South Asian Inspiration Awards)

== Jurisprudence ==
External videos
- 1972 Human Rights Complaint: France's Weasel's Fat Story, June 10, 2024, Alberta Human Rights Commission

Khullar stated that she believed Canada's judicial system should reflect the diversity of the country, both in demographics and in lived experiences. A proponent of the living tree doctrine and judicial activism, Khullar advocated for the rights of various protected groups, ranging from those with a disability to those under the LGBT spectrum. She described the role of judge in a constitutional democracy as having "to be alive to the interpretive principle that the constitution is a 'living tree' that is adaptable as society evolves, but is not a document that should be changed easily – the tree should not be uprooted."

Describing the Constitution of Canada as an aspirational document and "not a neutral legal instrument", Khullar used three notable 2015 Supreme Court cases known as the "Labour Trilogy" (Mounted Police Association of Ontario v Canada, Meredith v. Canada (Attorney General), and Saskatchewan Federation of Labour v Saskatchewan) to assert that their implications contributed to a significant evolution in the interpretation of part (d) of Section 2 of the Canadian Charter of Rights and Freedoms.

Regarding R v Oakes, Khullar discussed the development of privacy law in the context of employment and emphasized how the principles of balance and probability in the Oakes test has given labour arbitrators the ability to scrutinize the decisions of employers that have an impact on the privacy of their employers, both by shifting the power imbalance and protecting human dignity.

Further, remarking on R v Duarte and R v Wong, she concurred with the judgment on how unregulated technology has the potential to threaten our fundamental right to privacy based on Section 7 of the Canadian Charter of Rights and Freedoms, and spoke on how private sector privacy legislation should be interpreted regardless of whether the threat to a protected right is threatened by a public or private actor. As such, she remarked that legislation of that nature should be given a "broad, liberal, and purposive" interpretation to comply with both national and international standards of constitutional law.

Speaking of McLachlin's Court, Khullar stated her two favourite human rights jurisprudence landmark cases as British Columbia (Public Service Employee Relations Commission) v British Columbia Government Service Employees' Union and British Columbia (Superintendent of Motor Vehicles) v British Columbia (Council of Human Rights). She explained the decisions as underscoring the importance of assessing the actual impact of policies on individuals and mandate that both employers and service providers accommodate individuals to the point of undue hardship, ensuring a more inclusive approach to equality rights.

Regarding her contribution to the law, Khullar stated "Protecting and enhancing human rights, privacy and the dignity of individuals so they can choose to live their lives in ways that make sense to them, is my contribution to the law."

== Publications ==
- Khullar, Ritu (July 6, 2022). "Dale Gibson: Scholar, Teacher, and a Man of Principle". Alberta Law Review. 59 (4): 785–805. doi:10.29173/alr2697.
- Khullar, Ritu; Cosco, Vanessa (October 11, 2016). "The SCC Reimagines Freedom of Association in 2015". Constitutional Forum. 25 (2): 18. doi:10.21991/C96H34.
- Khullar, Ritu (January 19, 2016). "Influence of Oakes Outside the Charter, Specifically Labor Arbitration Jurisprudence". Ottawa Law Review. 43 (3): 18. SSRN 2717810.
- Khullar, Ritu; Cosco, Vanessa (November 26, 2010). Conceptualizing the Right to Privacy in Canada (PDF) (Report). National Administrative Law, Labor and Employment Law, and Privacy and Access Law PD Conference: Canadian Bar Association.
