= Ontario Court =

Ontario Court could refer to:

- Superior Court of Justice (Ontario)
- Ontario Court of Justice
- Ontario Court of Appeals
