= Catherine Fraser =

Canadian lawyer and judge

The Honourable Catherine Fraser AOE KC
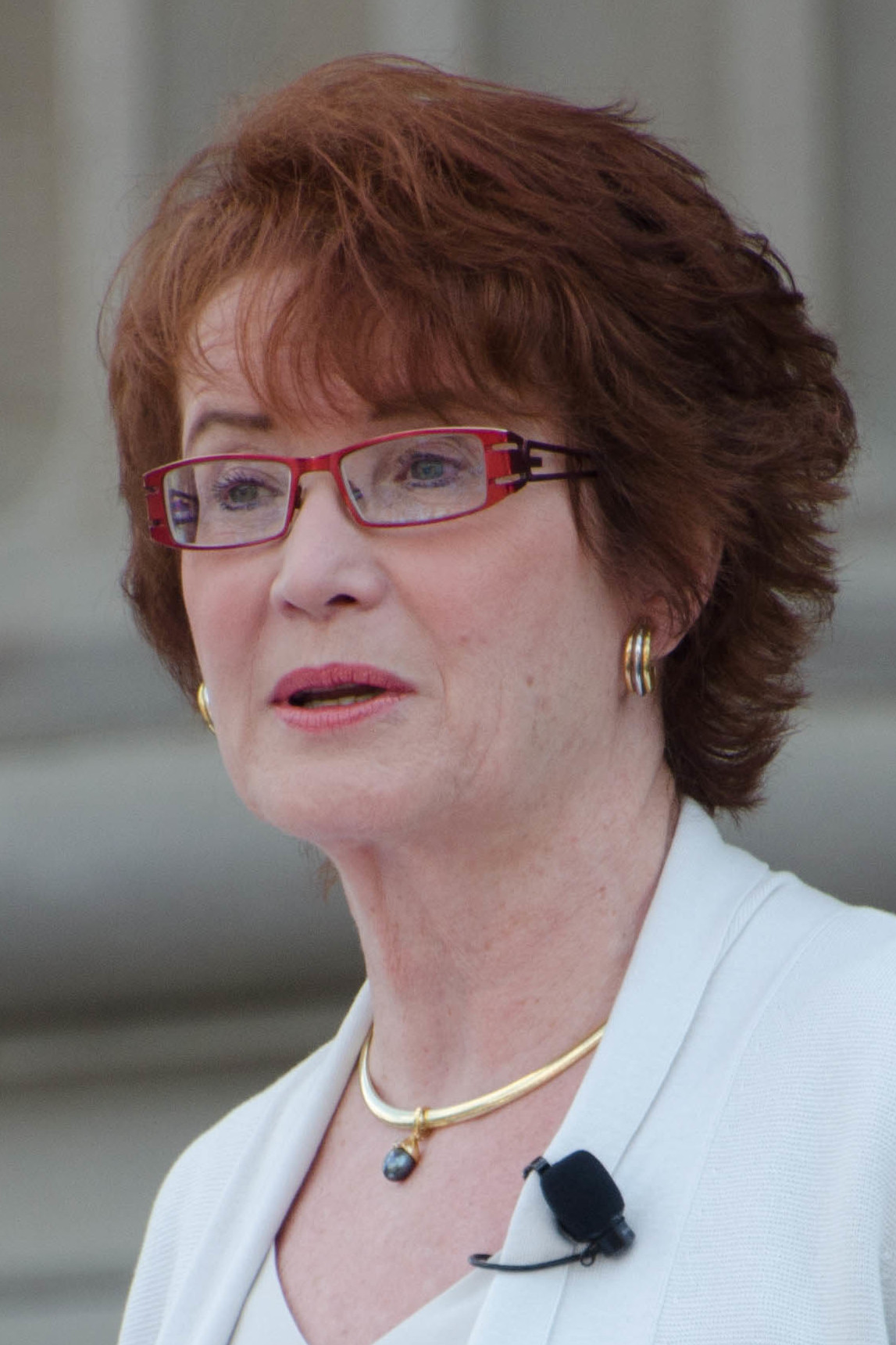
- Fraser in May 2015

Chief Justice of Alberta
- In office March 12, 1992 – July 30, 2022
- Preceded by: James Herbert Laycraft
- Succeeded by: Ritu Khullar

Chief Justice of the Court of Appeal for the Northwest Territories
- In office March 12, 1992 – July 30, 2022
- Succeeded by: Ritu Khullar

Chief Justice of the Nunavut Court of Appeal
- In office 1999 – July 30, 2022
- Preceded by: James Herbert Laycraft
- Succeeded by: Ritu Khullar

Personal details
- Born: August 4, 1947 (age 79) Campbellton, New Brunswick, Canada
- Education: University of Alberta; London School of Economics
- Occupation: lawyer/judge

Catherine Anne Fraser (born August 4, 1947) is a Canadian lawyer and judge who was the chief justice of Alberta from March 12, 1992, until July 30, 2022. As chief justice of Alberta, Fraser was also chief justice of the Court of Appeal for the Northwest Territories (since 1992) and the Nunavut Court of Appeal (since its creation in 1999).

== Early years ==
Fraser was born in Campbellton, New Brunswick and moved to Edmonton in 1958. Her mother worked as a teacher and her grandparents were immigrants from Lebanon and Ukraine. One of her first jobs was working in the women's section of a department store; she was paid $35 a week, five dollars less than her male colleague who worked in the men's section. Fraser stated in a 2014 interview with the Edmonton Journal that "it brought home to [her] the differences in how men and women were being treated during that era in our society." She also stated that she chose the law as a profession because she saw it as a "vehicle for change" and because she was "concerned about inequality in society."

A graduate of the University of Alberta, she received Bachelor of Arts and Bachelor of Laws degrees in 1969 and 1970 respectively. She received the George Bligh O'Connor Silver Medal in Law, awarded to the law student graduating with the second highest GPA over the three-year program. She also has a Master of Laws from the London School of Economics.

== Career ==
Prior to her appointment to the bench, Fraser practised law with the firm of Lucas, Bishop and Fraser, and became Queen's Counsel in 1983. She taught women and the law courses at the University of Alberta Faculty of Law.

First appointed to the Court of Queen's Bench of Alberta in 1989 and subsequently to the Court of Appeal of Alberta in 1991, she became the first woman appointed Chief Justice of Alberta on March 12, 1992. At age 44, she was also the youngest person appointed Chief Justice of Alberta.

Fraser was also on the Canadian Institute on the Administration of Justice, chair of the Education Committee of the Canadian Judicial Council and a member of the council's Special Committee on Equality in the Courts.

Due to Canadian mandatory retirement for justices at age 75, Chief Justice Fraser's term would have ended on August 4, 2022. However, Chief Justice Fraser retired effective July 30, 2022. Her replacement, Ritu Khullar, was sworn in on February 23, 2023.

=== Awards ===
She was recognized with a YWCA Tribute to Women Award. In 1996 she received the University of Alberta Alumni Association's Distinguished Alumni Award. On May 10, 2007, she received an Honorary Doctor of Laws degree from the University of Calgary.

Fraser was made a member of the Alberta Order of Excellence in 2024.
