= Section 101 of the Constitution Act, 1867 =

Provision of the Constitution of Canada

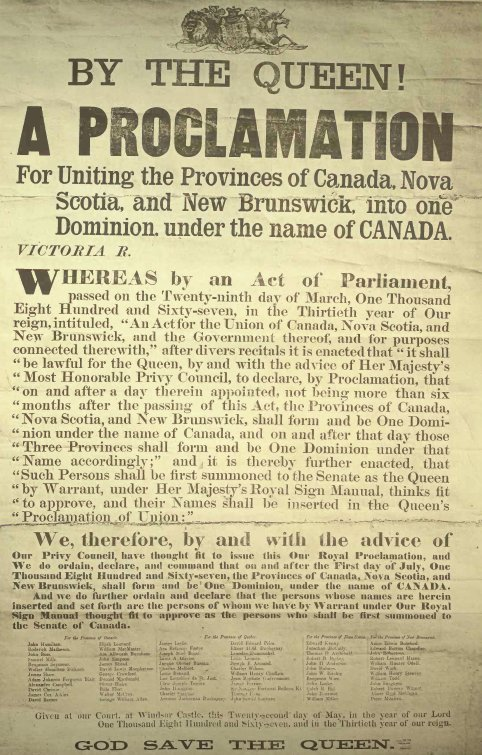
Proclamation bringing the Constitution Act into force, July 1, 1867

Section 101 of the Constitution Act, 1867 (French: article 101 de la Loi constitutionnelle de 1867) is a provision of the Constitution of Canada giving the federal Parliament the power to create the Supreme Court of Canada and the federal courts. Although Parliament created the Supreme Court by an ordinary federal statute in 1875, the Court is partially entrenched by the amending formula set out in the Constitution Act, 1982. The composition of the Court can only be changed by a unanimous constitutional amendment, passed by the two houses of Parliament, and all of the provincial legislative assemblies.

The Constitution Act, 1867 is the constitutional statute which established Canada. Originally named the British North America Act, 1867, the Act continues to be the foundational statute for the Constitution of Canada, although it has been amended many times since 1867. It is now recognised as part of the supreme law of Canada.

== Constitution Act, 1867 ==
The Constitution Act, 1867 is part of the Constitution of Canada and thus part of the supreme law of Canada. It was the product of extensive negotiations by the governments of the British North American provinces in the 1860s. The Act sets out the constitutional framework of Canada, including the structure of the federal government and the powers of the federal government and the provinces. Originally enacted in 1867 by the British Parliament under the name the British North America Act, 1867, in 1982 the Act was brought under full Canadian control through the Patriation of the Constitution, and was renamed the Constitution Act, 1867. Since Patriation the Act can only be amended in Canada, under the amending formula set out in the Constitution Act, 1982.

== Text of section 101 ==
Section 101 reads:

General Court of Appeal, &c.
101. The Parliament of Canada may, notwithstanding anything in this Act, from Time to Time provide for the Constitution, Maintenance, and Organization of a General Court of Appeal for Canada, and for the Establishment of any additional Courts for the better Administration of the Laws of Canada.

Section 101 is found in Part VII of the Constitution Act, 1867, dealing with the judicature. Section 101 has not been amended since the Act was enacted in 1867, but its scope was expanded by the passage of the Statute of Westminster 1931.

== Purpose and interpretation ==
=== Supreme Court of Canada ===
The Constitution Act, 1867 did not establish the Supreme Court of Canada. Instead, s. 101 gave the federal Parliament the power to establish a "general court of appeal" for Canada. After Confederation, there was extensive discussion of the proposed court of appeal, with three different bills being considered in the early 1870s. One of the major issues was how broad the scope of appeal would be. Should it be limited to matters of federal and constitutional law, or also allow appeals in matters of provincial law? This was a point of some concern to Members of Parliament from Quebec, who were worried that issues arising under Quebec's civil law would be determined by judges trained in the common law. Eventually, in 1875 Parliament enacted The Supreme and Exchequer Courts Act. The Act created the Supreme Court as an appellate court with general appellate jurisdiction, which included matters of provincial law.

The Supreme Court was not, however, the final court of appeal for Canada. Under British imperial law, a British subject had a right to appeal from colonial courts to the Crown in Britain. Those appeals were heard by the Judicial Committee of the Privy Council, which was effectively the highest court of appeal for the British Empire. Appeals therefore lay from the Supreme Court to the Judicial Committee. It was also possible for litigants to appeal directly from the provincial appellate courts to the Judicial Committee, bypassing the Supreme Court entirely. The decisions of the Judicial Committee bound the Supreme Court, as a matter of stare decisis and judicial precedent. A subsequent attempt by the federal Parliament to restrict appeals to the Judicial Committee, at least in criminal matters, was struck down by the Judicial Committee. It was not until the passage of the Statute of Westminster 1931 that Parliament gained the power to limit appeals to the Judicial Committee, which it exercised by passing a statute in 1949 which ended appeals to the Judicial Committee.

The Supreme Court now is the general court of appeal for Canada, and is a court for the better administration of the laws of Canada. It has general appellate jurisdiction over all questions of law, civil and criminal, and federal and provincial law. and its decisions are final and conclusive. The Supreme Court Act is the major act governing appeals to the Supreme Court, but there are also appellate rights under other federal statutes, notably the Criminal Code.

=== Federal courts ===
The federal Parliament has created a number of courts "for the better administration of the laws of Canada". The first such court was the Exchequer Court, created in 1875, which had exclusive jurisdiction over all cases involving federal revenue and taxes, and concurrent jurisdiction with the provincial superior courts for civil actions against the federal government. Appeals lay from the Exchequer Court either to the Supreme Court, or to the Judicial Committee of the Privy Council.

In 1971, the federal Parliament abolished the Exchequer Court and created a new Federal Court with two divisions, the Federal Court – Trial Division and the Federal Court of Appeal. The new Court had a much expanded jurisdiction, including judicial review of federal administrative agencies, exclusive jurisdiction over civil suits against the federal government, and civil actions under matters of exclusive federal jurisdiction, such as patents, trademarks and copyrights, and admiralty matters. An appeal lay from the Trial Division to the Federal Court of Appeal, with an appeal from the Federal Court of Appeal to the Supreme Court of Canada.

In 2003, Parliament enacted amendments to split the two divisions of the Federal Court into two separate courts: the Federal Court and the Federal Court of Appeal.

In addition to the Federal Court and the Federal Court of Appeal, Parliament has also created two specialised courts, the Tax Court of Canada and the Court Martial Appeal Court of Canada.

=== Adjudication of constitutional issues ===
Although section 101 gives Parliament the power to establish federal courts to administer federal law, Parliament cannot give the federal courts exclusive jurisdiction to determine constitutional issues that arise in cases under federal law. Section 96 of the Act assigns jurisdiction over constitutional matters to the provincial superior courts, and Parliament cannot reduce that core constitutional jurisdiction of those courts. Parliament can give federal courts the power to determine constitutional issues, but that grant of jurisdiction cannot eliminate the constitutional jurisdiction of the provincial superior courts.

== Related provisions ==
=== Section 41 of the Constitution Act, 1982 ===
The Constitution Act, 1982 contains the amending formula for all amendments to the Constitution of Canada. One provision of the amending formula relates to the Supreme Court. Section 41 of the 1982 Act sets out a number of constitutional provisions which can only be changed by unanimous consent of the Senate, the House of Commons, and all ten provincial legislative assemblies. One of items listed is "the composition of the Supreme Court of Canada". In Reference Re Supreme Court Act, ss 5 and 6, the Supreme Court has held that this provision of the amending formula limits the ability of Parliament to change the qualifications for judges of the Supreme Court, which can only be done by a constitutional amendment.

=== Preamble to the Constitution Act, 1867 ===
The Preamble to the Constitution Act, 1867 provides that Canada is to have a constitution "similar in principle to that of the United Kingdom". The Supreme Court of Canada has ruled that this phrase means that judicial independence, which is a basic principle of the British constitution, is also an unwritten constitutional principle in Canada. As a result, the federal government is constitutionally required to have an independent commission to review proposals for judicial compensation, including for the judges of the Supreme Court and the federal courts.

=== Section 96 of the Constitution Act, 1867 ===
Section 96 of the Act provides that the Governor General has the power to appoint judges of the provincial superior, district and county courts. Although in form an appointing power, section 96 has been interpreted as a guarantee of jurisdiction for the provincial superior courts, particularly in constitutional matters.
