= Nunavut Court of Justice =

Superior court for Nunavut, Canada

- Arms of the Court of Justice
- Established: 1999
- Jurisdiction: Nunavut
- Location: Iqaluit
- Composition method: Appointed by the federal government
- Authorised by: Government of Canada by Nunavut Act, 1993
- Appeals to: Nunavut Court of Appeal
- Number of positions: 6
- Website: http://www.nunavutcourts.ca/index.php/nunavut-court-of-justice

Chief Justice
- Currently: Mr Justice Neil Sharkey
- Since: 2016

The Nunavut Court of Justice (NUCJ; Inuktitut: ᓄᓇᕘᒥ ᐃᖅᑲᖅᑐᐃᔨᒃᑯᑦ, Nunavuumi Iqkaqtuijikkut; Inuinnaqtun: Nunavunmi Maligaliuqtiit, French: Cour de justice du Nunavut) is the superior court and territorial court of the Canadian territory of Nunavut. It is administered from the Nunavut Justice Centre (Building #510) in Iqaluit.

It was established on April 1, 1999 as Canada's only "unified" or single-level court with the consent of Canada, the Office of the Interim Commissioner of Nunavut and Nunavut Tunngavik Inc., the Inuit Land Claims representative organization. Prior to the establishment of Nunavut as a separate territory justice was administered through two courts, the Territorial Court of the Northwest Territories and the Supreme Court of the Northwest Territories.

Besides court proceedings in Iqaluit the judges travel as a circuit court to communities throughout the territory to conduct cases.

== Judges ==
=== Current judges ===
Position	Name	Appointed	Short History	Current Status
Justice	Andrew Mahar	March 2012	Clinic Director in Kitikmeot, Defence Counsel	Resigned, now a Justice of the Supreme Court of the Northwest Territories Solo Practitioner (2001 to 2012) Legal Aid (1994 to 1997)
Justice	Earl Johnson	2002	Senior Legal Counsel, Northwest Territories Department of Justice (Yellowknife) appointed in 2003 to support growing work of the Court, largely engaged in civil cases	Retired
Chief Justice	Neil Sharkey	December 2008	Legal Director at Maliiganik Tukisiniakvik (Iqaluit - 1986), first judge called to the bench from the Nunavut Bar, appellate practice, Justice of the Peace Administrator (1999)	Active
Justice	Susan Cooper	December 2009	Law Clerk to the Legislative Assembly of Nunavut, Partner with law firm Chandler & Cooper	Active
Justice	Bonnie M. Tulloch	March 2012	Special Advisor on northern issues, Public Prosecution Service of Canada, Legal Aid Executive Director (Gjoa Haven) and Kivalliq Legal Aid Director (Rankin Inlet), Director of Akitsiraq Law School Society	Active
Justice	Paul Bychok	December 2015	Crown Prosecutor	Active
Justice	Susan Charlesworth	June 2018	Criminal defence lawyer, defence counsel at Maliganik Tukisiniarvik Legal Services	Active
Justice	Christian Lyons	June 2018	Crown Prosecutor, defence counsel with legal aid in Iqaluit	Active

=== Past Judges ===
Position	Name	Appointed	Short History	Current Status
Senior Judge	Robert Kilpatrick	October 2009 1999	Appointed at the creation of Nunavut in 1999, Administrative Crown Counsel, (British Columbia), Legal Counsel in Inuvik and Whitehorse	Retired
Senior Judge	Beverley Browne	1993 - 2009	originally a Territorial Court Judge in pre-division Northwest Territories, made Senior judge in 1999 on the creation of Nunavut, strong supporter of the Akitsiraq Law School program, leader in music education (Iqaluit Music Society), church organist (St. Jude's Anglican Cathedral) and responsible for the integration of Inuit elders into functions in the Nunavut Courts.	Resigned, sitting on the Alberta Bench. Died on March 24, 2021.
