= Sobeys Stores Ltd v Yeomans =

Sobeys Stores Ltd. v. Yeomans and Labour Standards Tribunal (NS)
- Supreme Court of Canada

Hearing: February 5, 1988 Judgment: March 2, 1989
- Full case name: Sobeys Stores Ltd. v. Yeomans and Labour Standards Tribunal (NS)
- Citations: [1989] 1 S.C.R. 238, 90 N.S.R. (2d) 271, 57 D.L.R. (4th) 1, 25 C.C.E.L. 162
- Docket No.: 19682

Court membership
- Chief Justice: Brian Dickson; Puisne Justices: Jean Beetz, Willard Estey, William McIntyre, Antonio Lamer, Bertha Wilson, Gerald Le Dain, Gérard La Forest, Claire L'Heureux-Dubé

Reasons given
- Majority: Wilson J., joined by Dickson C.J. McIntyre and Lamer J.
- Concur/dissent: La Forest J., joined by Beetz and L'Heureux-Dubé JJ.

Sobeys Stores v. Yeomans and Labour Standards Tribunal (NS) [1989] 1 S.C.R. 238 is a leading Supreme Court of Canada case on determining if a tribunal has the authority to hear a dispute, and more generally, the interpretation of section 96 of the Constitution Act, 1867.

== Background ==
Sobeys, a Nova Scotia grocery chain, dismissed Yeomans, an employee of ten years. Yeomans made a complaint to the Director of Labour Standards of Nova Scotia for dismissal without just cause under the s. 67 of the Labour Standards Code. The Director held that Yeoman's claim was valid and ordered Sobeys to reinstate him. This was affirmed by the Labour Standards Tribunal.

Sobeys appealed the ruling to the Nova Scotia Court of Appeal on the basis that the tribunal did not have the constitutional authority to hear the case. Namely, that the tribunal was encroaching on the exclusive jurisdiction of the Superior courts, granted by section 96 of the Constitution Act, 1867.

The Nova Scotia Court of Appeal found in favour of Sobeys. The Supreme Court reconsidered this issue and in the process revamped the evaluation of section 96. The Court held that the tribunal did have the authority to hear the case, overturning the Court of Appeal.

== Reasons of the court ==
Justice Bertha Wilson, writing for the Court, held that the Act establishing the tribunal did not violate section 96 of the Constitution. Analysis of section 96, Wilson states, involves a three-step test established in Re Residential Tenancies Act, 1979.

The Court must 1) assess the historical conditions of the judicial system in 1867; 2) assess whether the provincial tribunal is exercising a judicial function; and 3) assess the context of the tribunal's exercise of power.
