= Andrew Mahar =

Canadian judge

Andrew Mahar is a Canadian lawyer. He was appointed as a justice on the Nunavat Court of Justice in March 2012 and served on it until May 2015, when he was appointed as a justice on the Supreme Court of the Northwest Territories, where he served as a full-time judge until April 2024. He practiced criminal law in Toronto, before working as an attorney in Cambridge Bay, Yellowknife, and Iqaluit in the 1990s and 2000s. After he ceased to be a full-time judge, he continued to work as a deputy judge on the NWT Supreme Court.
