= Aston J. Hall =

Associate Chief Justice to the Ontario Court of Justice

The Honourable Aston J. Hall
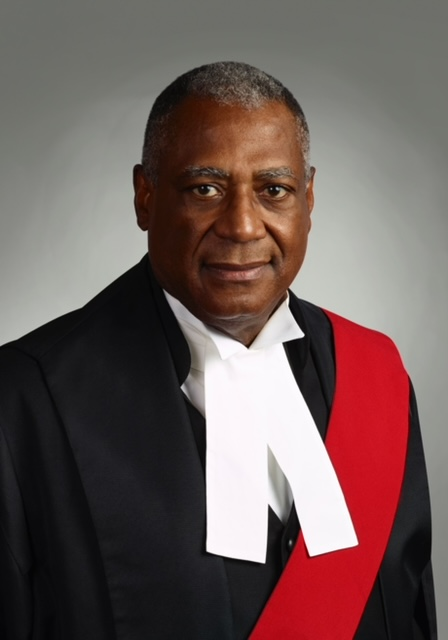

Associate Chief Justice to the Ontario Court of Justice
- Incumbent
- Assumed office June 3, 2021
- Preceded by: Peter J. DeFreitas

Personal details
- Born: Jamaica
- Education: Osgoode Hall Law School (Bachelor of Laws, Master of Laws, Doctor of Laws)

Aston Joseph Hall is a Canadian judge. On June 3, 2021, Hall was appointed Associate Chief Justice of the Ontario Court of Justice.

Hall studied law at Osgoode Hall Law School where he earned a Bachelor of Laws Degree and a Master of Laws Degree. He earned his Doctor of Laws, honoris causa (LLD) from the Law Society of Ontario in 2025. Hall also gave a speech at Call to the Bar ceremony in Toronto when he received his honorary PhD.

In 2011, Hall was appointed as a judge of the Ontario Court of Justice. He has been a member of the court's education secretariat since 2014. From 2015 to 2017, he was the local administrative judge in Scarborough, Ontario. He held the position of Regional Senior Justice for the Toronto Region from 2017 until his appointment as Associate Chief Justice in June 2021.

He is Ontario's first Black Associate Chief Justice.
