= Section 97 of the Constitution Act, 1867 =

Provision of the Constitution of Canada

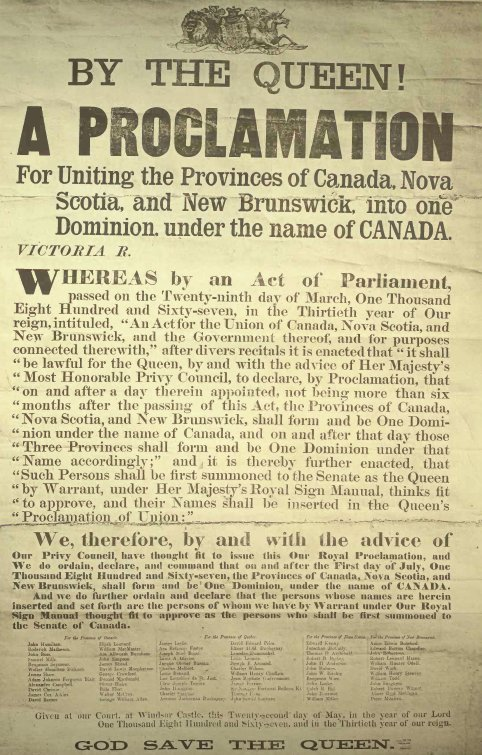
Proclamation bringing the Constitution Act into force, July 1, 1867

Section 97 of the Constitution Act, 1867 (French: article 97 de la Loi constitutionnelle de 1867) is a provision of the Constitution of Canada relating to the qualifications for judges of the provincial superior, district and county courts in the common law provinces.

The Constitution Act, 1867 is the constitutional statute which established Canada. Originally named the British North America Act, 1867, the Act continues to be the foundational statute for the Constitution of Canada, although it has been amended many times since 1867. It is now recognised as part of the supreme law of Canada.

== Constitution Act, 1867 ==
The Constitution Act, 1867 is part of the Constitution of Canada and thus part of the supreme law of Canada. It was the product of extensive negotiations by the governments of the British North American provinces in the 1860s. The Act sets out the constitutional framework of Canada, including the structure of the federal government and the powers of the federal government and the provinces. Originally enacted in 1867 by the British Parliament under the name the British North America Act, 1867, in 1982 the Act was brought under full Canadian control through the Patriation of the Constitution, and renamed the Constitution Act, 1867. Since Patriation the Act can only be amended in Canada, under the amending formula set out in the Constitution Act, 1982.

== Text of section 97 ==
Section 97 reads:

Selection of judges in Ontario &c.
97. Until the Laws relative to Property and Civil Rights in Ontario, Nova Scotia, and New Brunswick, and the Procedure of the Courts in those Provinces, are made uniform, the Judges of the Courts of those Provinces appointed by the Governor General shall be selected from the respective Bars of those Provinces.

Section 97 is found in Part VII of the Constitution Act, 1867, dealing with the judicature. Section 97 has not been amended since the Act was enacted in 1867.

== Purpose ==
Section 97 regulates the appointment of judges in the common law provinces (all provinces other than Quebec). Together with section 98 (which applies in Quebec), section 97 ensures that the courts of each province have judges who are knowledgeable about the law of the province, by requiring that judges be appointed from the Bar of the province where they will serve.

The distinction between this section and section 98, which provides for the appointment of judges for the Quebec courts, is that all the provinces except Quebec use the common law, while Quebec law is based on the civil law. A special provision is therefore needed for Quebec judges.

The reference to laws and procedure being made uniform relates to section 94, which anticipates that the common law provinces would agree on making their laws uniform and then transferring that jurisdiction to the federal Parliament. That provision has never been used, so judges are still appointed from the Bar of each province.
