= Section 98 of the Constitution Act, 1867 =

Provision of the Constitution of Canada

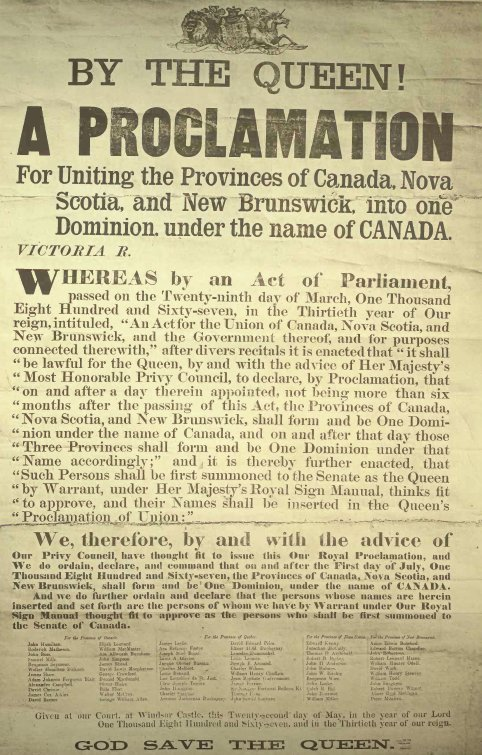
Proclamation bringing the Constitution Act into force, July 1, 1867

Section 98 of the Constitution Act, 1867 (French: article 98 de la Loi constitutionnelle de 1867) is a provision of the Constitution of Canada relating to the qualifications for judges of the provincial superior, district and county courts in the province of Quebec.

The Constitution Act, 1867 is the constitutional statute which established Canada. Originally named the British North America Act, 1867, the Act continues to be the foundational statute for the Constitution of Canada, although it has been amended many times since 1867. It is now recognised as part of the supreme law of Canada.

== Constitution Act, 1867 ==
The Constitution Act, 1867 is part of the Constitution of Canada and thus part of the supreme law of Canada. It was the product of extensive negotiations by the governments of the British North American provinces in the 1860s. The Act sets out the constitutional framework of Canada, including the structure of the federal government and the powers of the federal government and the provinces. Originally enacted in 1867 by the British Parliament under the name the British North America Act, 1867, in 1982 the Act was brought under full Canadian control through the Patriation of the Constitution, and renamed the Constitution Act, 1867. Since Patriation the Act can only be amended in Canada, under the amending formula set out in the Constitution Act, 1982.

== Text of section 98 ==
Section 98 reads:

Selection of judges in Quebec
98. The Judges of the Courts of Quebec shall be selected from the Bar of that Province.

Section 98 is found in Part VII of the Constitution Act, 1867, dealing with the judicature. It has not been amended since the Act was enacted in 1867.

== Purpose ==
This provision, along with section 97, ensures that the courts of each province have judges who are knowledgeable about the law of their province. The reason for this section applying only to Quebec is that Quebec law is based on the civil law, unlike the other provinces, which use the common law. This provision ensures that the judges of the Quebec courts will be trained and experienced in the civil law, as members of the Bar of Quebec. Appointment of judges in the common law provinces is governed by section 97.
