= Ontario Court of Justice =

Canadian provincial court

- Jurisdiction: Ontario
- Composition method: Appointed by the Lieutenant Governor of Ontario on advice of the Attorney General of Ontario
- Authorised by: Courts of Justice Act
- Appeals to: Superior Court of Justice; Court of Appeal for Ontario
- Judge term length: 8 years (Chief Justice); 6 years (Associate Chief Justices)
- Website: ontariocourts.ca/ocj

Chief Justice of the Ontario Court of Justice
- Currently: Sharon Nicklas
- Since: May 1, 2023
- Lead position ends: 2023

Associate Chief Justice of the Ontario Court of Justice
- Currently: Aston J. Hall
- Since: June 3, 2021
- Lead position ends: 2027

Associate Chief Justice of the Ontario Court of Justice and Coordinator of Justices of the Peace
- Currently: Jeanine E. LeRoy
- Since: September 23, 2023

The Ontario Court of Justice (French: Cour de justice de l'Ontario) is the provincial court of record for the Canadian province of Ontario. The court sits at more than 200 locations across the province and oversees matters relating to family law, criminal law, and provincial offences.

== Jurisdiction ==
This court is subordinate in relationship to the "superior courts". The term "provincial court" or "territorial court" is often used to mean a lower court whose decisions can be reviewed by a superior court. Decades ago, they were managed at the local municipal level.

The Ontario Court of Justice is a division of the Court of Ontario. The other division of the Court of Ontario is the Superior Court of Justice. Until 1999, the Ontario Court of Justice was known as the Ontario Court (Provincial Division).

=== Family law ===
Family law cases deal with matters of custody, access and support, child protection so long as these are not incidental of or were not previously a part of a divorce application. Cases are heard by a judge only. Appeals from these cases are heard by the Superior Court of Justice.

=== Criminal law ===
The Court deals with approximately 95% of criminal charges laid within the province and has responsibility for other matters pertaining to criminal law, including authorizing search warrants, bail hearings, and peace bonds, under sections 515 and 810 of the Criminal Code, respectively.

Criminal law cases heard before the Court are summary conviction offences, less serious indictable offences under section 553 of the Criminal Code, and indictable offences where the defendant has elected to have their trial heard in the Ontario Court of Justice (excluding offences found under section 469 of the Criminal Code – murder, treason, etc.). Criminal cases are heard by a judge only. Appeals from cases involving summary conviction offences are heard by the Superior Court of Justice. Appeals involving indictable matters are heard by the Ontario Court of Appeal.

Criminal law matters before the Court also include remand or bail hearings and peace bonds. These matters are not required to be heard by a judge and may be dealt with by a justice of the peace. An appeal of a bail decision (bail review) must be heard by the Superior Court of Justice.

== Structure of the Court ==
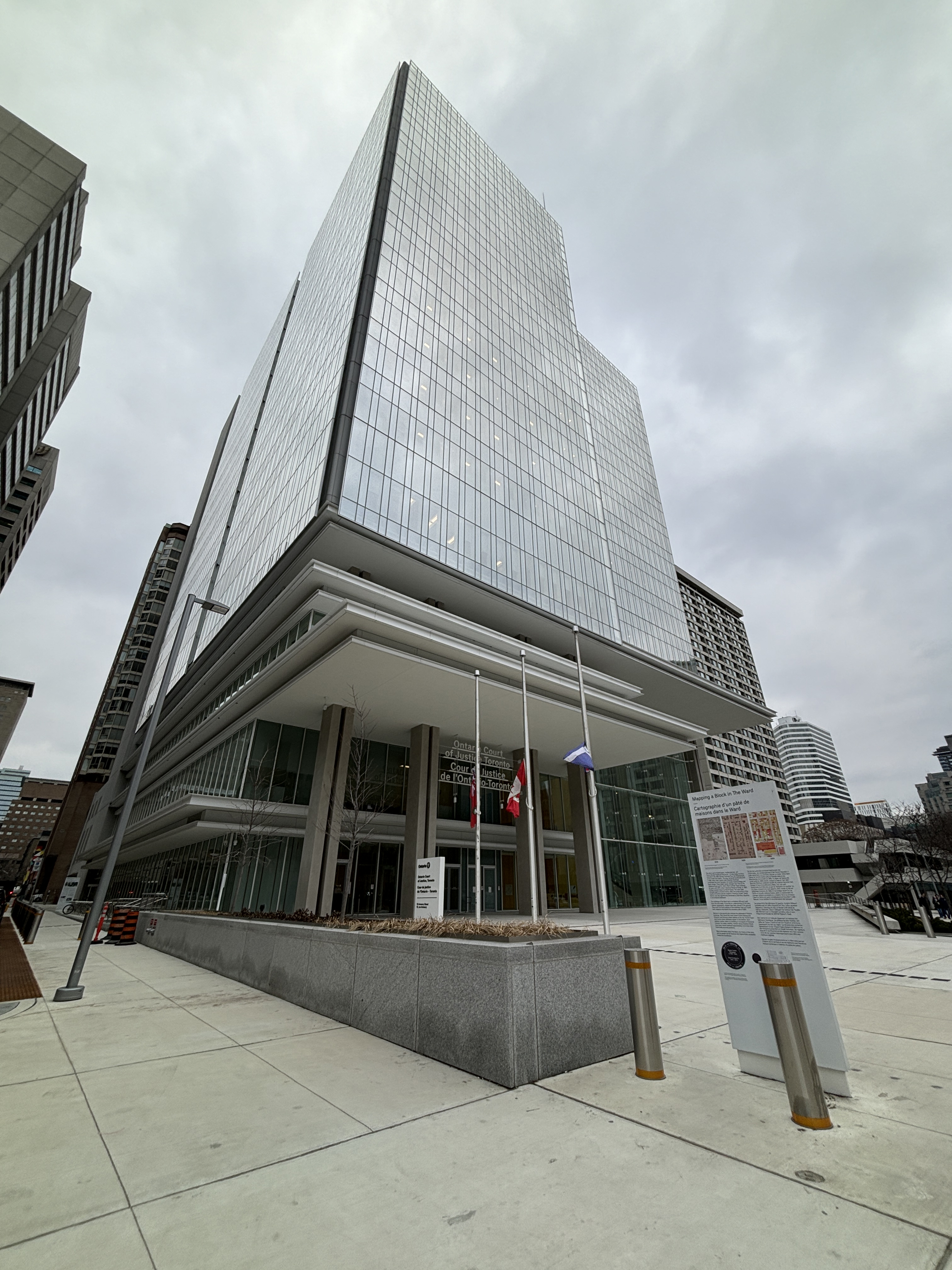
Ontario Court of Justice - Toronto

Section 35 of the Courts of Justice Act sets out the structure of the Ontario Court of Justice.

=== Provincial judges ===
Provincial judges are appointed, as considered necessary, by the Lieutenant Governor in Council on the recommendation of the attorney general. A provincial judge must:

(a) been a member of the bar of one of the provinces or territories of Canada for at least 10 years; or

(b) has for an aggregate of 10 years,

(i) been a member of a bar mentioned in clause (a), and

(ii) after becoming a member of such a bar, exercised powers and performed duties of a judicial nature on a full-time basis in respect to a position held under a law of Canada or of one of its provinces or territories.

The normal age of retirement for a provincial judge is age 65, however there are exceptions that allow a provincial judge to continue in office until age 75, at which point they are required to retire without exception.

=== Judicial Appointments Advisory Committee ===
The Judicial Appointments Advisory Committee is responsible for finding suitable candidates for appointment as a judge of the Ontario Court of Justice. Only persons recommended by the Committee may be appointed. Appointments are made by the Lieutenant Governor in Council, on the recommendation of the Attorney General of Ontario. The Committee is currently composed of thirteen members.

=== Chief Justice ===
The Lieutenant Governor in Council may, on the recommendation of the attorney general, appoint a provincial justice to the position of Chief Justice of the Ontario Court of Justice. The Chief Justice is the President of the Ontario Court of Justice. They are responsible for directing and supervising the sittings of the Court throughout Ontario and for assigning its judicial duties. If the Chief Justice is absent from Ontario or is for any reason unable to act, their powers and duties shall be exercised and performed by an associate chief justice of the Ontario Court of Justice designated by the Chief Justice. A Chief Justice has a single term of office of eight years, but will nonetheless continue in office until a successor is appointed, up to a total term of nine years.

=== Associate Chief Justice ===
The Lieutenant Governor in Council may, on the recommendation of the attorney general, appoint provincial justices to the positions of Associate Chief Justice and Associate Chief Justice-Coordinator of Justices of the Peace of the Ontario Court of Justice for single terms of six years. The Associate Chief Justice and the Associate Chief Justice-Coordinator of Justices of the Peace provide support to the Chief Justice and have specific delegated responsibilities as well as those set out in statute. The Associate Chief Justice-Coordinator of Justices of the Peace administers the Ontario Native Justice of the Peace Program. Within the Court, the principal responsibility for this program falls to the Senior Justice of the Peace/Administrator of the Ontario Native Justice of the Peace Program. The stated goal of the program is to encourage and enable Aboriginal Canadians to play a greater role in decision-making in the administration of justice, by serving as justices of the peace, particularly in areas of the province with significant Aboriginal population.

=== Regional Senior Justice ===
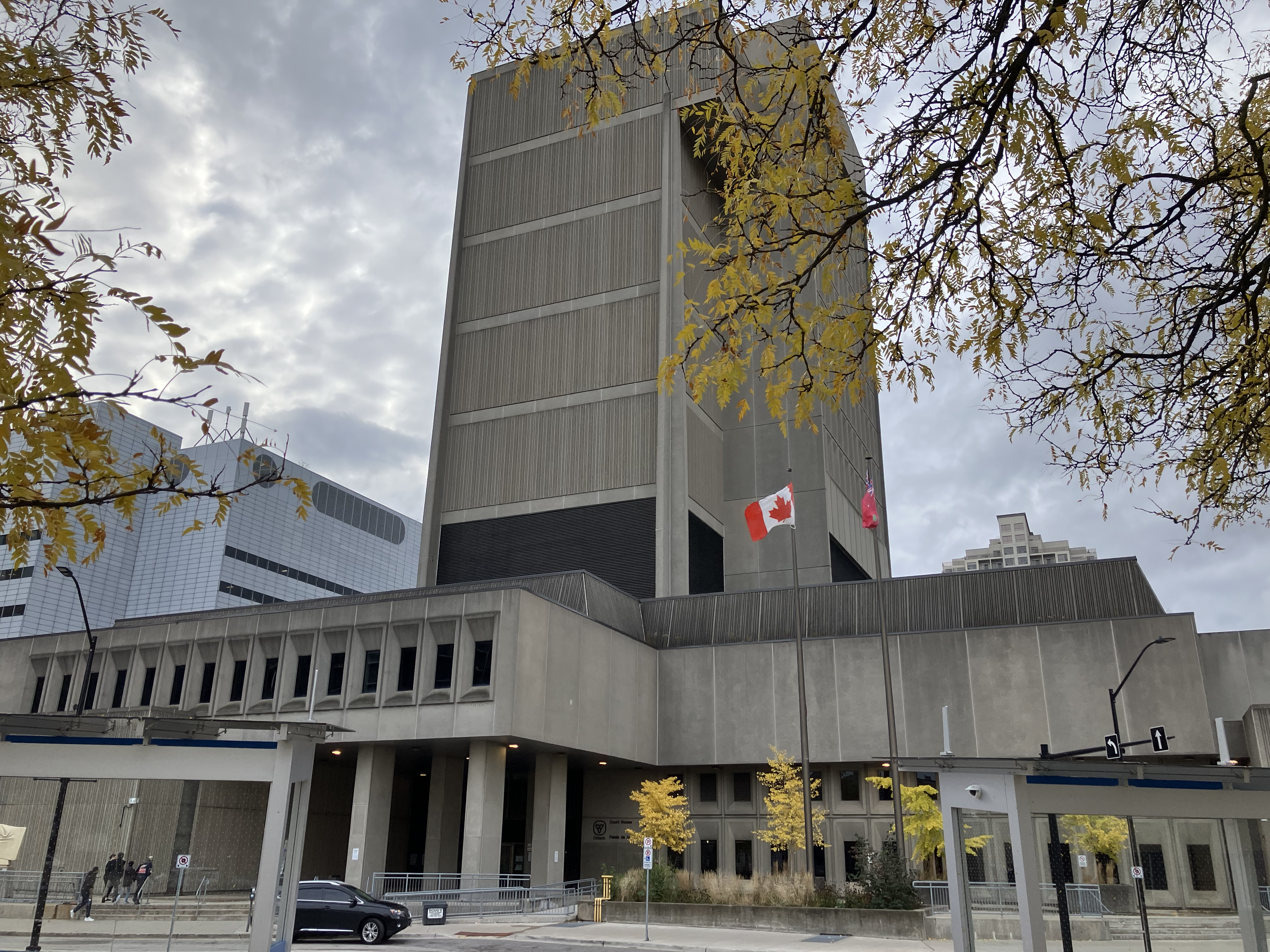
The Ontario Court of Justice regional building in London, Ontario

Ontario is divided into seven geographic regions for judicial administration: northwest, northeast, west, central west, central east, east, and Toronto. Each region has a regional senior judge and a regional senior justice of the peace. The Lieutenant Governor in Council may, on the recommendation of the attorney general, appoint a provincial justice to the position of regional senior justice for a term of three years. The responsibilities of a regional senior judge are to exercise the same powers and functions as the Chief Justice of the Ontario Court of Justice in their region, subject to their authority. A regional senior justice also assists in the supervision of the justices of the peace within that region. This is done in consultation with the Associate Chief Justice-Coordinator of Justices of the Peace and the regional senior justice of the peace.

== Regions ==
Regions
Central East Region (10 base courts, 7 satellite courts)	Central West Region (9 base courts, 2 satellite courts)	East Region (10 base courts, 10 satellite courts)	Northeast Region (10 base courts, 20 satellite courts)
Peterborough; Lindsay; Orillia; Bracebridge; Midland; Newmarket; Oshawa; Barrie	Orangeville; Brampton; Milton; Burlington; Hamilton; St. Catharines; Welland; Brantford; Simcoe	Pembroke; Perth; L'Original; Cornwall; Ottawa-Carleton; Brockville; Kingston; Napanee; Belleville	Cochrane; Timmins; Haileybury; Sault Ste Marie; Elliot Lake; Gore Bay; Sudbury; North Bay; Parry Sound
Northwest Region (4 base courts, 36 satellite courts)	Toronto Region (7 base courts, 2 satellite courtrooms)	West Region (15 base courts, 4 satellite courts)	
Kenora; Fort Frances; Dryden; Thunder Bay	Base courts: 10 Armoury St. Satellite courtrooms: 1530 Markham Rd. 2700 Eglinton Ave. W.	Windsor; Chatham; Sarnia; Goderich; Walkerton; Owen Sound; Stratford; London; St. Thomas; Woodstock; Kitchener; Cambridge; Guelph	

== Current justices ==
The current Chief Justice of the Ontario Court of Justice is Sharon M. Nicklas, whose term began on May 1, 2023.

One of the two Associate Chief Justices of the Ontario Court of Justice is Aston J. Hall, whose term began on June 3, 2021.

The second of the two Associate Chief Justices of the Ontario Court of Justice, who is also the Coordinator of Justices of the Peace, is Jeanine E. LeRoy, whose term began on September 2, 2019.

Each judicial region has its own Regional Senior Justice:

- Central East Region: Esther Rosenberg (starting June 1, 2018)
- Central West Region: Paul R. Currie (starting August 31, 2019)
- East Region: W. Vincent Clifford (starting September 25, 2020)
- Northeast Region: Karen L. Lische (starting June 4, 2021)
- Northwest Region: David M. Gibson (starting June 12, 2021)
- Toronto Region: Sandra Bacchus (starting June 3, 2021)
- West Region: Jeanine E. LeRoy (starting February 1, 2019)

The Ontario Court of Justice maintains a full list of all current judges and justices of the peace of the court on its website.

== Fired Justices of the Peace ==
- Anna Mae Gibbon (2023)
- Dianne Jean Ballam (2022)
- John Guthrie (2019)
- T.L. (Tom) Foulds (2018)
- Errol Massiah (2015)
- Donna Phillips (2013)

== See also ==
- Courts of Ontario
