= Reference Re Residential Tenancies Act (Ontario) =

- Supreme Court of Canada

Hearing: November 25-26, 1980 Judgment: May 28, 1981
- Full case name: Re Residential Tenancies Act, 1979, [1981] 1 S.C.R. 714
- Citations: [1981] 1 S.C.R. 714

Court membership
- Chief Justice: Bora Laskin; Puisne Justices: Ronald Martland, Roland Ritchie, Brian Dickson, Jean Beetz, Willard Estey, William McIntyre, Julien Chouinard, Antonio Lamer

Reasons given
- Majority: Dickson J. (as he then was)

Reference Re Residential Tenancies Act (Ontario), [1981] 1 S.C.R. 714 is a leading Supreme Court of Canada decision on the jurisdiction of superior courts provided by section 96 of the Constitution Act, 1867. The Court formulated a three-step test for determining whether an administrative body was encroaching upon the jurisdiction of the superior courts.

== Test formulated by Court ==
Justice Dickson, writing for the majority, suggested the test.

1. Firstly, it must be determined "whether the power or jurisdiction conforms to the power or jurisdiction exercised by superior, district or county courts at the time of Confederation."
2. Secondly, the test asks "whether the function itself is different when viewed in that setting. In particular, can the function still be considered to be a 'judicial' function."
3. Thirdly, the test asks the court to "review the tribunal's function as a whole in order to appraise the impugned function in its entire institutional context."

In this case, it was determined that Ontario's Residential Tenancies Act was not valid provincial legislation.

== Subsequent case law ==
The test was later applied in Massey Ferguson Industries v. Govt. of Sask., [1981] 2 S.C.R. 413, and eventually modified in Sobeys Stores v. Yeomans, [1989] 1 S.C.R. 238.

== See also ==
- List of Supreme Court of Canada cases (Laskin Court)
