= Court of Ontario =

Canadian court

The Court of Ontario is the formal legal title describing the combination of both Ontario trial courts — the Superior Court of Justice and the Ontario Court of Justice.

As a result of amendments to Ontario's Courts of Justice Act that came into effect in 1999, the Court of Ontario is the continuation of the court previously known as the "Ontario Court of Justice".

Although the Superior Court of Justice and Ontario Court of Justice are formally divisions of the Court of Ontario, the two courts have different rules, powers and jurisdictions, and their judges are appointed by different levels of government. In practice, the Superior Court of Justice and the Ontario Court of Justice operate as separate courts, but under the legislation, they are formally divisions of the Court of Ontario.
