= Section 100 of the Constitution Act, 1867 =

Provision of the Constitution of Canada

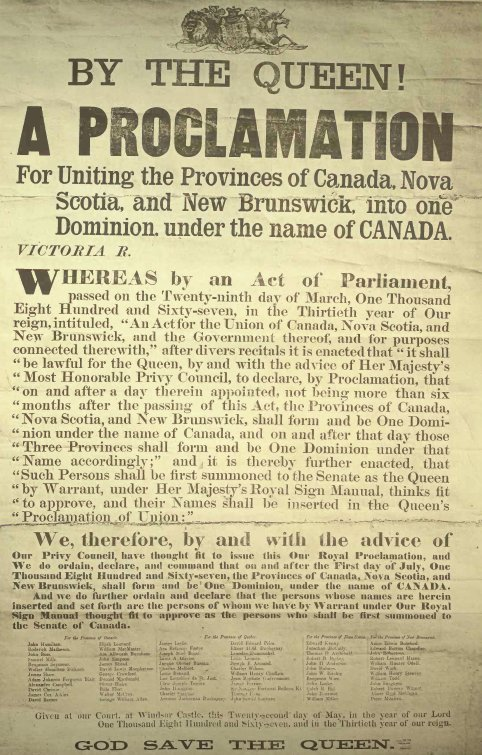
Proclamation bringing the Constitution Act into force, July 1, 1867

Section 100 of the Constitution Act, 1867 (French: article 100 de la Loi constitutionnelle de 1867) is a provision of the Constitution of Canada requiring the federal Parliament to fix and provide for the salaries for judges of the provincial superior, district and county courts.

The Constitution Act, 1867 is the constitutional statute which established Canada. Originally named the British North America Act, 1867, the Act continues to be the foundational statute for the Constitution of Canada, although it has been amended many times since 1867. It is now recognised as part of the supreme law of Canada.

== Constitution Act, 1867 ==
The Constitution Act, 1867 is part of the Constitution of Canada and thus part of the supreme law of Canada. It was the product of extensive negotiations by the governments of the British North American provinces in the 1860s. The Act sets out the constitutional framework of Canada, including the structure of the federal government and the powers of the federal government and the provinces. Originally enacted in 1867 by the British Parliament under the name the British North America Act, 1867, in 1982 the Act was brought under full Canadian control through the Patriation of the Constitution, and was renamed the Constitution Act, 1867. Since Patriation the Act can only be amended in Canada, under the amending formula set out in the Constitution Act, 1982.

== Text of section 100 ==
Section 100 reads:

Salaries, &c. of Judges
100. The Salaries, Allowances, and Pensions of the Judges of the Superior, District, and County Courts (except the Courts of Probate in Nova Scotia and New Brunswick), and of the Admiralty Courts in Cases where the Judges thereof are for the Time being paid by Salary, shall be fixed and provided by the Parliament of Canada.

Section 100 is found in Part VII of the Constitution Act, 1867, dealing with the judicature. It has not been amended since the Act was enacted in 1867.

== Purpose and interpretation ==
Section 100 ensures that the federal Parliament will provide for salaries of the judges of the provincial superior, district and county courts. This is a fundamental provision to ensure judicial independence. The provision is modelled on the financial security clause for English judges, set out in the Act of Settlement 1701. That Act provided that judicial salaries were to be "ascertained and established".

== Related provisions ==
=== Preamble ===
The Preamble to the Constitution Act, 1867 provides that Canada is to have a constitution "similar in principle to that of the United Kingdom". The Supreme Court of Canada has ruled that this phrase means that judicial independence, which is a basic principle of the British constitution, is also an unwritten constitutional principle in Canada. As a result, the federal government is constitutionally required to have an independent commission to review proposals for judicial compensation, before it implements changes to the salary under section 100.

=== Section 99 ===
Taken together, section 100 and section 99, which provides for security of tenure for the judges, are constitutional guarantees for judicial independence. The two sections ensure that judges cannot be arbitrarily removed from office and have their salaries provided by the federal government.
