= Section 99 of the Constitution Act, 1867 =

Provision of the Constitution of Canada

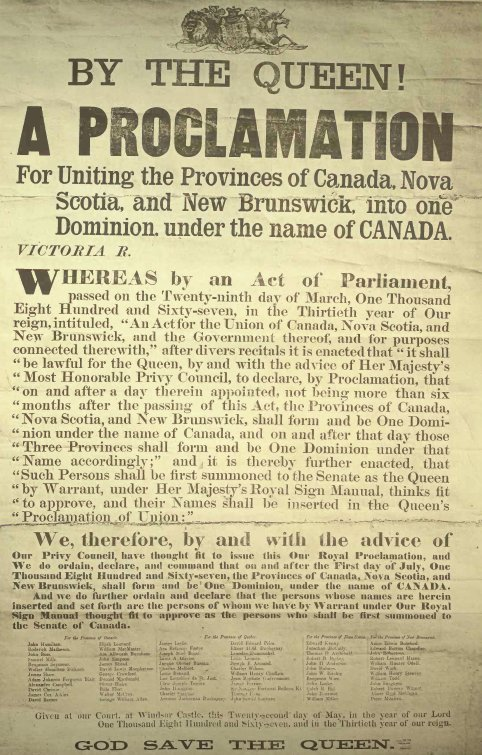
Proclamation bringing the Constitution Act into force, July 1, 1867

Section 99 of the Constitution Act, 1867 (French: article 99 de la Loi constitutionnelle de 1867) is a provision of the Constitution of Canada relating to the tenure and retirement age of the provincial superior court judges in Canada.

The Constitution Act, 1867 is the constitutional statute which established Canada. Originally named the British North America Act, 1867, the Act continues to be the foundational statute for the Constitution of Canada, although it has been amended many times since 1867. It is now recognised as part of the supreme law of Canada.

== Constitution Act, 1867 ==
The Constitution Act, 1867 is part of the Constitution of Canada and thus part of the supreme law of Canada. It was the product of extensive negotiations by the governments of the British North American provinces in the 1860s. The Act sets out the constitutional framework of Canada, including the structure of the federal government and the powers of the federal government and the provinces. Originally enacted in 1867 by the British Parliament under the name the British North America Act, 1867, in 1982 the Act was renamed the Constitution Act, 1867. Since Patriation of the Constitution in 1982, the Act can only be amended in Canada, under the amending formula set out in the Constitution Act, 1982.

== Text of section 99 ==
Section 99 reads:

Tenure of office of judges
99.(1) Subject to subsection (2) of this section, the judges of the superior courts shall hold office during good behaviour, but shall be removable by the Governor General on address of the Senate and House of Commons.
(2) A judge of a superior court, whether appointed before or after the coming into force of this section, shall cease to hold office upon attaining the age of seventy-five years, or upon the coming into force of this section if at that time he has already attained that age.

Section 99 is found in Part VII of the Constitution Act, 1867, dealing with the judicature.

== Amendment of section 99 ==
Section 99 has been amended once since the Act was enacted in 1867. When originally enacted in 1867, section 99 consisted of what is now subsection (1), setting out the guarantee of tenure during good behaviour. In 1960, the provision was amended by renumbering the original part as subsection (1), and adding subsection (2), imposing a retirement age of 75 on judges of the provincial superior courts.

== Purpose ==
=== Tenure ===
Section 99(1) guarantees security of tenure for the judges of the superior courts, "during good behaviour". This is a fundamental provision to ensure judicial independence. The phrase comes from the English Act of Settlement of 1701, which provided that judges of the royal courts would hold their office quamdiu se bene gesserint (Latin: "as long as he shall behave himself well").

=== Retirement age ===
When the Constitution Act, 1867 was enacted, section 99 provided for life tenure for superior court judges. The only way a judge could be removed from office was by the joint address of the two houses of Parliament. This was changed in 1960, when the House of Commons and the Senate passed resolutions calling on the British government to introduce an amendment to create mandatory retirement at age 75. The Constitution Act, 1960 renumbered the original part of section 99 as sub-section (1), and added sub-section (2), which set the retirement age at 75. The provision took effect on March 1, 1961, meaning that any judge who was aged 75 or older on that date automatically lost their position.

== Related provisions ==
=== Preamble ===
The Preamble to the Constitution Act, 1867 provides that Canada is to have a constitution "similar in principle to that of the United Kingdom". The Supreme Court of Canada has ruled that this phrase means that judicial independence, which is a basic principle of the British constitution, is also an unwritten constitutional principle in Canada. As a result, the federal government is constitutionally required to have an Independent commission to review proposals for judicial compensation.

=== Section 100 ===
Taken together, section 99(1) and section 100, which requires the federal government to pay the salaries of provincial superior, district and county courts, are constitutional guarantees for judicial independence. The two sections ensure that judges cannot be arbitrarily removed from office, and must have their salaries provided by the federal government.
