= Court system of Canada =

The court system of Canada is made up of many courts differing in levels of legal superiority and separated by jurisdiction. In the courts, the judiciary interpret and apply the law of Canada. Some of the courts are federal in nature, while most are provincial or territorial.

The Constitution of Canada gives the federal Parliament of Canada exclusive jurisdiction in criminal law, while the provinces have exclusive control over much of civil law. Each province has authority over the administration of justice within that province.

Most cases are heard in provincial and territorial courts. Provincial and territorial superior courts have inherent jurisdiction over civil and criminal cases. Provincial and territorial lower courts try most criminal offences, small civil claims, and some family matters.

The smaller federal court system consists of the Federal Court, Federal Court of Appeal, and Tax Court. There are also the courts martial, for military offences, with an appeal to the Court Martial Appeal Court. The jurisdiction of the Federal Court and the Federal Court of Appeal is limited to cases where the subject matter is within federal jurisdiction and regulated by federal law, and where the administration of that law has been conferred upon the federal courts by a statute passed by Parliament. These matters include immigration and refugee law, navigation and shipping, intellectual property, federal taxation, some portions of competition law and certain aspects of national security, as well as the review of most federal administrative decisions. The federal courts and provincial and territorial courts share jurisdiction over civil actions against the federal government.

The Supreme Court of Canada is the final court of appeal for all levels of court in Canada. Any legal issue, whether under the Constitution of Canada, federal law, or provincial law, potentially can be heard and determined by the Supreme Court.

The federal government appoints and pays for both the judges of the federal courts and the judges of the superior appellate and trial level courts of each province. The provincial governments are responsible for appointing judges of the lower provincial courts. Although not judicial courts themselves, administrative tribunals also feed into the provincial/territorial and federal court hierarchies. This intricate interweaving of federal and provincial powers is typical of the Canadian constitution.

== Levels and branches of the court system ==
Canadian court system (Source Canadian Department of Justice)

Generally speaking, Canada's court system is a four-level hierarchy, as shown below from highest to lowest in terms of legal authority. Each court is bound by the rulings of the courts above them, under the principle of stare decisis. They are not bound by the rulings of other courts at the same level in the hierarchy, or of higher courts in a different branch of the hierarchy (for example, an appeals court in a different province from the trial court).

=== Terminology ===
There are two terms used in describing the Canadian court structure which can be confusing for which clear definitions are useful.

==== Provincial courts ====
The first is the term provincial court, which has two quite different meanings, depending on context. The first, and most general meaning, is that a provincial court is a court established by the legislature of a province, under its constitutional authority over the administration of justice in the province, set out in s. 92(14) of the Constitution Act, 1867. This head of power gives the provinces the power to regulate "... the Constitution, Maintenance, and Organization of Provincial Courts, both of Civil and of Criminal Jurisdiction, and including Procedure in Civil Matters in those Courts". All courts created by a province, from the small claims court or municipal by-law court, up to the provincial court of appeal, are provincial courts in this general sense.

However, there is a more limited meaning to the term. In most provinces, the Provincial Court is the term used to refer to a specific court created by the province which is the main criminal court, having jurisdiction over most criminal offences except for the most serious ones. The Provincial Court of a particular province may also have a limited civil jurisdiction, over small claims and some family law matters. The exact scope of the jurisdiction of the Provincial Court will depend on the laws enacted by the particular province. Provincial Courts in this sense are courts of limited statutory jurisdiction, sometimes referred to as "inferior courts". As courts of limited jurisdiction, their decisions are potentially subject to judicial review by the superior courts via the prerogative writs, but in most cases there are now well-established statutory rights of appeal instead.

To distinguish between the two meanings of the term, capitalization is used. A reference to a provincial court normally is a reference to the broad meaning of the term, any court created by the province. A reference to Provincial Court normally is referring to the specific court of limited statutory jurisdiction, created by the province. The term "Provincial Court" is used in the name of each such court, except for those of Alberta (Alberta Court of Justice), Ontario (Ontario Court of Justice), and Quebec (Court of Quebec). The Northwest Territories and Yukon each possess an analogous Territorial Court, while the Nunavut Court of Justice, although a superior court, also has the jurisdiction which is assigned to provincial or territorial courts in other jurisdictions.

==== Superior courts ====
The second is the term superior courts. This term also has two different meanings, one general and one specific.

The general meaning is that a superior court is a court of inherent jurisdiction. Historically, these courts are the descendants of the royal superior courts in England. The decisions of a superior court are not subject to review unless a statute specifically provides for review or appeal. The term is not limited to trial courts. The provincial courts of appeal and the Federal Court of Appeal are also superior courts.

The more limited sense is that Superior Court can be used to refer to the superior trial court of original jurisdiction in the Province. This terminology is used in the court systems of Ontario and Quebec.

The difference between the two terms is also indicated by capitalization. The term superior court is used to mean the general sense of the term, while Superior Court is used to refer to specific courts in provinces which use that term to designate their superior trial courts.

In Ontario and Quebec, this court is known as the Superior Court (Cour supérieure); in Alberta, Saskatchewan, Manitoba, and New Brunswick, as the Court of King's Bench (Cour du Banc du Roi); and in Newfoundland and Labrador, British Columbia, Nova Scotia, Prince Edward Island, Yukon, and the Northwest Territories as the Supreme Court (Cour suprême). The term Supreme Court can be confusing, as it could suggest a final appellate court, like the Supreme Court of Canada; each province has an appellate court with an appellate jurisdiction from the superior trial court.

Certain superior courts include specialized commercial court programs. The Superior Court in Toronto has a Commercial List created in 1991, with a team of judges who have experience in managing complex commercial litigation matters. Similarly, the Superior Court in Montreal has a Commercial Division, while the Court of the King's Bench of Alberta has a Commercial List.

In Nunavut, there is a single unified trial court, the Nunavut Court of Justice, which is a superior court of general jurisdiction.

=== Supreme Court of Canada ===
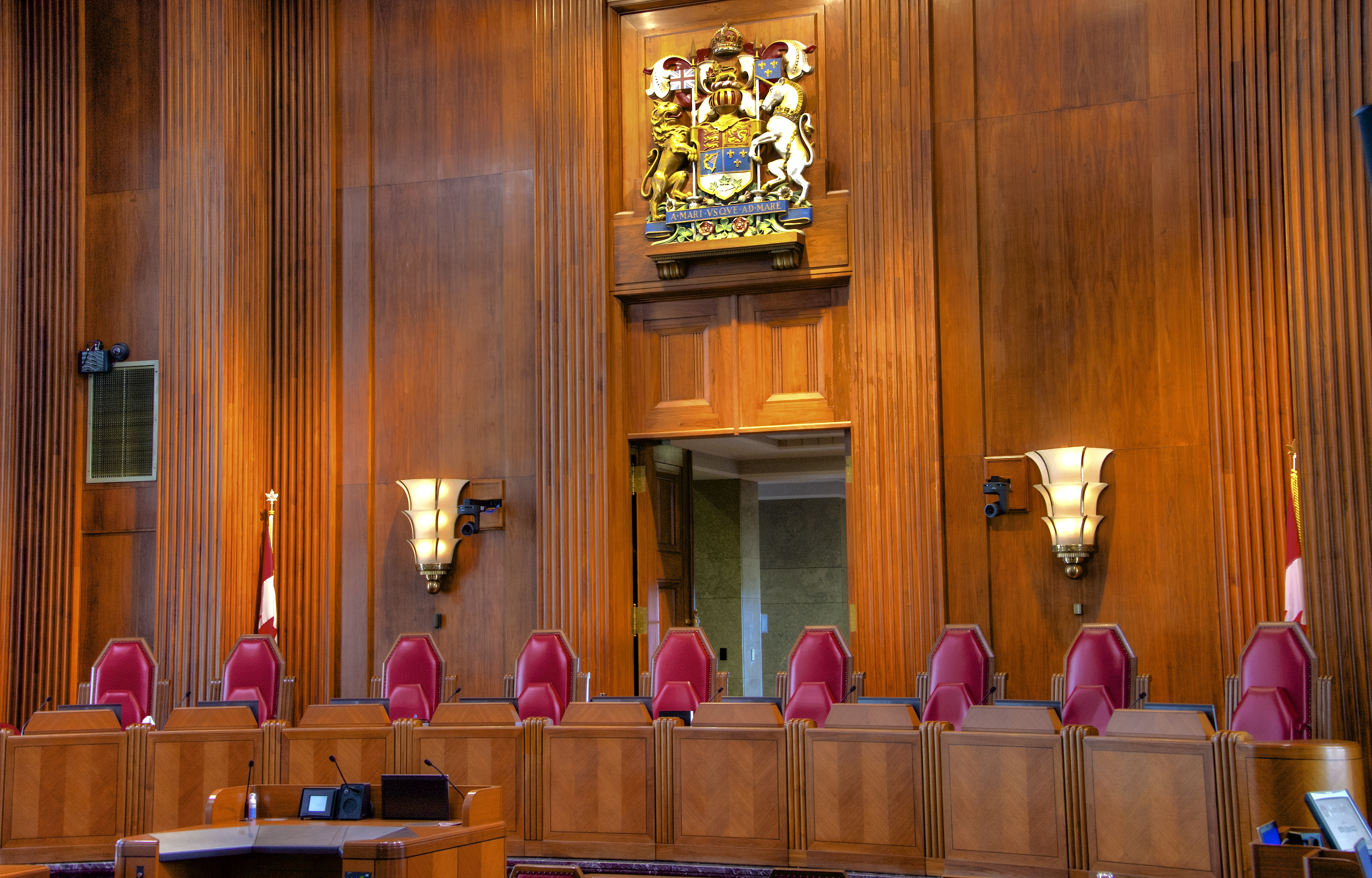
The bench for justices of the Supreme Court of Canada, the final court of appeals in the country

The Supreme Court is established by the Supreme Court Act as the "General Court of Appeal for Canada". The Court consists of nine justices, the Chief Justice of Canada and eight puisne justices. The court's duties include hearing appeals of decisions from the appellate courts and, on occasion, delivering references (i.e., the court's opinion) on constitutional questions raised by the federal government. By law, three of the nine justices are appointed from Quebec because of Quebec's use of civil law; by convention, the other justices are divided among the other regions of Canada.

The Constitution Act, 1867 gives the federal Parliament the power to create a "General Court of Appeal for Canada". Following Confederation, the Conservative government of Sir John A. Macdonald proposed the creation of a Supreme Court and introduced two bills in successive sessions of Parliament to trigger public debate on the proposed court and its powers. Eventually, in 1875, the Liberal government of Alexander Mackenzie passed an Act of Parliament that established the Supreme Court. The 1875 Act built upon the proposals introduced by the Macdonald government, and passed with all-party support.

Initially, decisions of the Supreme Court could be appealed to the Judicial Committee of the British Privy Council. As well, litigants could appeal directly from the provincial courts of appeal directly to the Judicial Committee, by-passing the Supreme Court entirely. There was a provision in the 1875 Act which attempted to limit appeals to the Judicial Committee. That clause resulted in the Governor General reserving the bill for consideration by the Queen-in-Council. After much debate between Canadian and British officials, royal assent was granted on the understanding the clause did not in fact affect the royal prerogative to hear appeals, exercised through the Judicial Committee.

The question of the power of Parliament to abolish appeals to the Judicial Committee eventually was tested in the courts. In 1926, the Judicial Committee ruled that the Canadian Parliament lacked the jurisdiction to extinguish appeals to the Judicial Committee, as the right of appeal was founded in the royal prerogative and could only be terminated by the Imperial Parliament.

Following the enactment of the Statute of Westminster, in 1933 the federal Parliament passed legislation again abolishing the right of appeal in criminal matters. In 1935, the Judicial Committee upheld the constitutional validity of that amendment.

In 1939, the federal government proposed a reference to the Supreme Court of Canada, asking whether the federal Parliament could terminate all appeals to the Judicial Committee. By a 4–2 decision, the Supreme Court held that the proposal was within the powers of the federal Parliament and would be constitutional. The question was then appealed to the Judicial Committee, but the hearing of the appeal was delayed by the outbreak of World War II. In 1946, the Judicial Committee finally heard the appeal and upheld the decision of the majority of the Supreme Court, clearing the way for Parliament to enact legislation to end all appeals to the Judicial Committee, whether from the Supreme Court or from the provincial courts of appeal.

In 1949, Parliament passed an amendment to the Supreme Court Act which abolished all appeals to the Judicial Committee, making the Supreme Court of Canada the final court of appeal. However, cases which had been instituted in the lower courts prior to the amendment could still be appealed to the Judicial Committee. The last Canadian appeal to the Judicial Committee was not decided until 1960.

=== Courts of the provinces and territories ===
==== Provincial and territorial appellate courts ====
These courts of appeal exist at the provincial and territorial levels. They are superior courts and were separately constituted in the early decades of the 20th century, replacing the former full courts of the old supreme courts of the provinces. Their function is to hear appeals from decisions rendered by the trial courts and to deliver references when requested by a provincial or territorial government as the Supreme Court of Canada does for the federal government. These appellate courts do not normally conduct trials or hear witnesses.

- Court of Appeal of Alberta (ABCA)
- Court of Appeal of British Columbia (BCCA)
- Manitoba Court of Appeal (MBCA)
- Court of Appeal of New Brunswick (NBCA)
- Court of Appeal of Newfoundland and Labrador (NLCA)
- Court of Appeal for the Northwest Territories (NTCA)
- Nova Scotia Court of Appeal (NSCA)
- Nunavut Court of Appeal (NUCA)
- Court of Appeal for Ontario (ONCA)
- Prince Edward Island Court of Appeal (PECA)
- Quebec Court of Appeal (QCCA)
- Court of Appeal for Saskatchewan (SKCA)
- Court of Appeal of Yukon (YKCA)

Each of these appellate courts is the highest court of its respective province or territory. The chief justice of each province or territory's court of appeal is styled the province or territory's chief justice.

==== Provincial and territorial superior trial courts ====
The superior trial courts of the provinces and territories have inherent jurisdiction over civil and criminal matters, except where that jurisdiction is limited by statute. Though statutes grant authority over small claims, some family claims, and almost all criminal matters to provincial courts, the superior trial courts remain the courts of first instance for divorce petitions, any civil claims, and criminal prosecutions for some indictable offences. They also hear appeals from the lower trial court and decide upon petitions for judicial review of decisions of administrative agencies such as labour relations boards, human rights tribunals and licensing authorities. Superior trial court judges establish and interpret legal precedents in civil and criminal law. The judges sitting on these courts, like those of the appellate courts, are appointed and paid by the federal government.

- Court of King's Bench of Alberta (ABKB or ABQB)
- Supreme Court of British Columbia (BCSC)
- Court of King's Bench of Manitoba (MBKB or MBQB)
- Court of King's Bench of New Brunswick (NBKB or NBQB)
- Supreme Court of Newfoundland and Labrador (NLSC)
- Supreme Court of the Northwest Territories (NTSC)
- Supreme Court of Nova Scotia (NSSC)
- Nunavut Court of Justice (NUCJ)
- Court of Ontario – Superior Court of Justice (ONSC)
- Supreme Court of Prince Edward Island (PESC)
- Quebec Superior Court (QCCS)
- Court of King's Bench for Saskatchewan (SKKB or SKQB)
- Supreme Court of Yukon (YKSC)

Many of these courts have specialized branches that deal only with certain matters such as family law or, in the case of Ontario, a Divisional Court which only appeals and judicial reviews of administrative tribunals and whose decisions have greater binding authority than those from the "regular" branch of the Ontario Superior Court of Justice. Although some of these courts are named the "Supreme Court", they are not the highest courts in their respective province or territory.

Most provinces and territories have special courts dealing with small claims. The value of such claims varies between $15,000 and $50,000. Some are divisions of superior courts, while in other provinces they are lower courts or divisions of lower courts. Parties often represent themselves, without lawyers, in these courts.

==== Provincial and territorial courts of limited jurisdiction ====
Each province and territory in Canada (other than Nunavut) also has an additional trial court, usually called a Provincial (or Territorial) Court, to hear certain types of cases. For historical reasons, these courts are sometimes referred to as "inferior courts", indicating their position in the judicial hierarchy as subject to the superior courts. The term is not a commentary on their professionalism or expertise. In Nunavut, the functions of superior and territorial court are combined in the Nunavut Court of Justice.

Appeals from these courts are heard either by the superior trial court of the province or territory or by the provincial or territorial court of appeal. In criminal cases, this depends on the seriousness of the offence. Preliminary hearings are normally held in provincial courts prior to the case being transferred to superior court for trial. These courts are created by provincial statute and only have the jurisdiction granted by statute. Accordingly, inferior courts do not have inherent jurisdiction. These courts are usually the successors of older local courts presided over by lay magistrates and justices of the peace who did not necessarily have formal legal training. However, today all judges are legally trained, although justices of the peace may not be. Many inferior courts have specialized functions, such as hearing only criminal law matters, youth matters, family law matters, small claims matters, "quasi-criminal" offences (i.e., violations of provincial statutes), or bylaw infractions. In some jurisdictions these courts serve as an appeal division from the decisions of administrative tribunals.

In the province of Ontario, most municipal and provincial offences are dealt with in the Provincial Offences Court, established under the Ontario Provincial Offences Act and the Courts of Justice Act.

Quebec also has a system of municipal courts that hear cases such as municipal and traffic infractions. Municipal courts in large cities such as Montreal and Quebec City may also hear minor criminal cases.

- Alberta Court of Justice (ABCJ)
- Provincial Court of British Columbia (BCPC)
- Provincial Court of Manitoba (MBPC)
- Provincial Court of New Brunswick (NBPC)
- Provincial Court of Newfoundland and Labrador (NLPC)
- Territorial Court of the Northwest Territories (NTTC)
- Provincial Court of Nova Scotia (NSPC)
- Nunavut Court of Justice (NUCJ)
- Court of Ontario – Ontario Court of Justice (ONCJ)
- Provincial Court of Prince Edward Island (PEPC)
- Court of Quebec (QCCQ)
- Provincial Court of Saskatchewan (SKPC)
- Territorial Court of Yukon (YKTC)

=== Federal courts ===
In addition to the Supreme Court of Canada, there are three civil courts created by the federal Parliament under its legislative authority under section 101 of the Constitution Act, 1867: the Federal Court of Appeal, the Federal Court, and the Tax Court of Canada. There is also the military court system of courts martial, with an appeal to the Court Martial Appeal Court of Canada.

Parliament's ability to grant jurisdiction to federal courts is limited to matters which are governed by existing federal laws. The Federal Court has concurrent jurisdiction with the provincial superior courts over claims against the federal government, and review of the constitutional validity of federal laws.

==== Federal Court of Appeal ====
The Federal Court of Appeal hears appeals from decisions rendered by the Federal Court, the Tax Court of Canada and a certain group of federal administrative tribunals like the National Energy Board and the Canada Industrial Relations Board. All judges of the Federal Court are ex officio judges of the Federal Court of Appeal, and vice versa, although it is rare that a judge of one court will sit as a member of the other. The Federal Court of Appeal is a travelling court. The judges of the Court sit in panels of three, and hear cases in English and in French in 18 cities, from Vancouver to St. John's, including locations in northern Canada.

==== Federal Court ====
The Federal Court exists primarily to review administrative decisions by federal government bodies such as the immigration board and to hear lawsuits under the federal government's jurisdiction such as intellectual property and maritime law. It also has concurrent jurisdiction with the superior trial courts of the provinces to hear civil lawsuits brought against the federal government. The Federal Court also has jurisdiction to determine inter-jurisdictional legal actions between the federal government and a province, or between different provinces, provided the province in question has passed corresponding legislation granting the Federal Court jurisdiction over the dispute. The Federal Court have the power to review decisions, orders, and other administrative actions of most federal boards, commissions, and tribunals. That means most federal government administrative decisions can be challenged in the Federal Court. Also with the Federal Court, the system may refer back to questions of law, jurisdiction, or price to one of the federal courts at any stage of proceeding.

In the aftermath of 9/11, Parliament enacted a number of laws to protect national security. The Federal Court has exclusive jurisdiction to determine many issues which arise under those laws relating to national security.

Appeals lie from the Federal Court to the Federal Court of Appeal.

==== Tax Court of Canada ====
The Tax Court of Canada has a very specialized jurisdiction. It hears disputes over federal taxes, primarily under the federal Income Tax Act, between taxpayers and the federal government. Also, for most people that live in Canada, it is the Tax Court's power to hear appeals under the Income Tax Act. The Tax Court has the jurisdiction to hear appeals under various statutes. However, as a federal court, it lacks the power to deal with disputes relating to provincial income taxes and provincial sales taxes, and has no jurisdiction to grant any relief where a taxpayer wishes to sue the Canada Revenue Agency for damages. Lastly, the Tax Court's powers are also limited by the statutes that impose the tax in dispute. The Tax Court is not empowered to make decisions on the basis that they will yield a fair result. Rather, the Tax Court can only make decisions based on its interpretation of the legislation.

==== History of the federal courts ====
The first federal court was the Exchequer Court of Canada, created in 1875 at the same time as the Supreme Court of Canada. The Exchequer Court was a trial court, with a limited jurisdiction over civil actions brought against the federal government, tax disputes under federal tax laws, admiralty matters, compensation for expropriation of private property by the federal Crown, negligence of federal public servants, and intellectual property, including patents and copyright. The name of the court came from the Exchequer Court of England, which had a similar jurisdiction over tax disputes. At first, there were no separate judges for the Exchequer Court. The judges of the Supreme Court of Canada were also appointed to the Exchequer Court. Individual judges of the Supreme Court would sit as a judge of the Exchequer Court, with an appeal lying to the Supreme Court. The Exchequer Court did not have any jurisdiction to review the actions of federal administrative agencies; this function was fulfilled by the provincial superior trial courts.

In 1971, Parliament passed the Federal Court Act which abolished the Exchequer Court and created a new court, the Federal Court of Canada. The jurisdiction of the Federal Court was significantly greater than the Exchequer Court, as it received the power to review decisions of federal administrative officials and tribunals. That Court had two divisions: the Federal Court – Trial Division, and the Federal Court – Appeal Division. Although the two divisions had different functions, they were all part of a single court.

The Exchequer Court and then the Federal Court initially had exclusive jurisdiction over claims against the federal government, but this jurisdiction was made concurrent with the provincial superior courts by amendments to the Federal Courts Act in 1990.

In 2003, Parliament passed legislation which divided the Federal Court into two courts. The Federal Court – Trial Division became the Federal Court of Canada, while the Federal Court – Appeal Division became the Federal Court of Appeal. The jurisdiction of the two new courts is essentially the same as the corresponding former divisions of the Federal Court.

=== Military courts ===
Military courts in Canada include the summary trial hearing, court martial (including general court martial and standing court martial), and the Court Martial Appeal Court of Canada.

Summary trials are ad hoc hearings used to dispense with minor service offences. The presiding officer will have little formal legal training and is generally the service member's commanding officer. In this respect, these hearings are similar to the former lay magistrates' courts.

The courts martial are conducted and presided over by military personnel and exist for the prosecution of military personnel, as well as civilian personnel who accompany military personnel, accused of violating the Code of Service Discipline, which is found in the National Defence Act and constitutes a complete code of military law applicable to persons under military jurisdiction.

The decisions of the courts martial can be appealed to the Court Martial Appeal Court of Canada which, in contrast, exists outside the military and is made up of civilian judges. This appellate court is the successor of the Court Martial Appeal Board which was created in 1950, presided over by civilian judges and lawyers, and was the first ever civilian-based adjudicating body with authority to review decisions by a military court. The Court Martial Appeal Court is made up of civilian judges from the Federal Court, Federal Court of Appeal, and the superior courts of the provinces.

=== Administrative tribunals ===
Known in Canada as simply "tribunals", these are quasi-judicial adjudicative bodies, which means that they hear evidence and render decisions like courts, but are not necessarily presided over by judges. Instead, the adjudicators may be experts in the subject matter handled by the tribunal (e.g., labour law, human rights law, immigration law, energy law, workers' compensation law, liquor licensing law, etc.). Adjudicators hear arguments and receive evidence from parties before making a decision.

Adjudicative functions which can be given to provincially appointed administrative tribunals are limited by section 96 of the Constitution Act, 1867, as this section will be violated where an adjudicative function is the sole or central aspect of a tribunal, and where that power broadly conforms to one that was exercised by superior courts at the time of Confederation. This has not significantly affected the ability of provincial governments to establish expert administrative tribunals, and there have been few challenges of this kind to administrative tribunal powers.

Depending on its enabling legislation, a tribunal's decisions may be reviewed by a court through an appeal or a process called judicial review. The reviewing court may be required to show some deference to the tribunal if the tribunal possesses some highly specialized expertise or knowledge that the court does not have. The degree of deference will also depend on such factors as the specific wording of the legislation creating the tribunal. Tribunals whose enabling legislation contains a privative clause are entitled to a high degree of deference, although a recent decision of the Supreme Court of Canada has arguably lowered that degree of deference.

Tribunals which have the power to decide questions of law may take into consideration the Canadian Charter of Rights and Freedoms, which is part of Canada's constitution. The extent to which tribunals may use the Charter in their decisions is a source of ongoing legal debate.

Appearing before some administrative tribunals may feel like appearing in court, but the tribunal's procedure is relatively less formal than that of a court, and more importantly, the rules of evidence are not as strictly observed, so that some evidence that would be inadmissible in a court hearing may be allowed in a tribunal hearing, if relevant to the proceeding. While relevant evidence is admissible, evidence which the adjudicator determines to have questionable reliability, or is otherwise questionable, is most likely to be afforded little or no weight.

As with courts, lawyers routinely appear in tribunals as representatives of their clients. A person does not require a lawyer to appear before an administrative tribunal. Indeed, many of these tribunals are specifically designed to be more representative to unrepresented litigants than courts. Some tribunals are part of a comprehensive dispute-resolution system, which may emphasize mediation rather than litigation. For example, provincial human rights commissions routinely use mediation to resolve many human rights complaints without the need for a hearing.

What tribunals all have in common is that they are created by statute, their adjudicators are usually appointed by government, and they focus on very particular and specialized areas of law. Because some subjects (e.g., immigration) fall within federal jurisdiction while others (e.g., liquor licensing and workers' compensation) are within provincial jurisdiction, some tribunals are created by federal law while others are created by provincial law. There are both federal and provincial tribunals for some subjects, such as unionized labour and human rights.

The principle of stare decisis does not apply to tribunals. In other words, a tribunal adjudicator could legally make a decision that differs from a past decision, on the same subject and issues, delivered by the highest court in the land. Because a tribunal is not bound by legal precedent, established by itself or by a reviewing court, a tribunal is not a court even though it performs an important adjudicative function and contributes to the development of law like a court would do.

Although stare decisis does not apply to tribunals, their adjudicators will likely nonetheless find a prior court decision on a similar subject to be highly persuasive and will likely follow the courts in order to ensure consistency in the law and to prevent the embarrassment of having their decisions overturned by the courts. The same is usually true for past decisions of the tribunal.

Among the federal tribunals, there is a small group of tribunals whose decisions must be appealed directly to the Federal Court of Appeal rather than to the Federal Court Trial Division. These so-called "super tribunals" are listed in subsection 28(1) of the Federal Courts Act and some examples include the National Energy Board, Canadian International Trade Tribunal, the Competition Tribunal, the Canada Industrial Relations Board (i.e., federal labour board), the Copyright Board and the Canadian Radio-television and Telecommunications Commission (CRTC).

== Judicial independence ==
The judiciary is a separate and independent branch of government with constitutional status. Judicial independence is a constitutional principle, and is necessary to protect the rule of law.

The constitutional principle of judicial independence is protected for provincial superior court judges by sections 99 and 100 of the Constitution Act, 1867 which guarantees judicial tenure and salaries. It is also constitutionally protected for judges hearing criminal matters by section 11(d) of the Canadian Charter of Rights and Freedoms. However, the Supreme Court of Canada has held that the principle of judicial independence is a foundational structural component of the Constitution of Canada and applies to all judges and courts, without an express written guarantee of judicial independence by providing guaranteed salaries and tenure. The Supreme Court relied in part on the preamble to the Constitution Act, 1867 in its decision on this point.

Judicial independence has two aspects: the autonomy and independence of judges from other branches of government, and immunity from legal consequences for actions which are taken in the performance of judicial functions.

=== Reference Re Remuneration of Judges ===
In Reference re Remuneration of Judges of the Provincial Court, a majority of the Supreme Court of Canada held that the Constitution of Canada includes an unwritten constitutional principle of judicial independence, recognized by the preamble to the Constitution Act, 1867.

The issue at stake was whether provincial legislatures' measures reducing salaries of provincial court judges were constitutionally valid. The majority held that provinces are constitutionally obliged to establish judicial compensation commissions. The effect of this decision was that the Constitution requires salaries of provincial court judges to be protected in some manner, but this protection need not be identical to that of superior courts.

A further Supreme Court decision in Provincial Court Judges' Assn of New Brunswick v New Brunswick (Minister of Justice) clarified that salary review commission recommendations are not binding, and departures from advisory recommendations may be justified so long as "rational" reasons are provided. After the previous decision in 1997, substantial increases in salaries were recommended by some judicial compensation commissions, and not all such recommendations were accepted by governments. A unanimous Court expressed a desire to avoid further disputes by clarifying the role of the commission process.

==== Reasons of the majority ====
It was held that the right to judicial independence was thus extended to provincial court judges in the following core characteristics:

- security of tenure (ie, judges can only be removed for cause, after an inquiry in which he must be given a full opportunity to be heard)
- financial security (ie, the right to salary of a provincial court judge is established by law, and there is no way in which the Executive can interfere with that right in a manner to affect the independence of the individual judge)
- administrative independence (which is the control by the courts over the administrative decisions that bear directly and immediately on the exercise of the judicial function)

In addition, there are two dimensions of judicial independence:

- the individual independence of a judge, and
- the institutional or collective independence of the court or tribunal of which that judge is a member

The relationship between these two aspects of judicial independence is that an individual judge may enjoy the essential conditions of judicial independence but if the court or tribunal over which the judge presides is not independent of the other branches of government, in what is essential to its function, the judge cannot be said to be an independent tribunal.

With respect to its applicability to protecting the financial security of judges' salaries, the following principles were stated:

- salaries of provincial courts may be varied, but only after undertaking an independent, effective, and objective process by an independent body;
- under no circumstances is it permissible for the judiciary — not only collectively through representative organizations, but also as individuals — to engage in negotiations over remuneration with the executive or representatives of the legislature;
- any reductions to judicial remuneration, including de facto reductions through the erosion of judicial salaries by inflation, cannot take those salaries below a basic minimum level of remuneration which is required for the office of a judge.

== Inherent versus statutory jurisdiction ==
=== Courts of inherent jurisdiction ===
The superior courts from the provinces and territories are courts of inherent jurisdiction, which means that the jurisdiction of the superior courts is more than just what is conferred by statute. Following the principles of English common law, because the superior courts derive their authority from the Constitution, they can hear any matter unless there is a federal or provincial statute that says otherwise or that gives exclusive jurisdiction to some other court or tribunal. The doctrine of inherent jurisdiction gives superior courts greater freedom than statutory courts to be flexible and creative in the delivering of legal remedies and relief.

=== Statutory courts ===
The Supreme Court of Canada, the federal courts, the various appellate courts from the provinces and territories, and the numerous low-level provincial courts are statutory courts whose decision-making power is granted by either the federal parliament or a provincial legislature.

The word "statutory" refers to the fact that these courts' powers are derived from a statute and is defined and limited by the terms of the statute. A statutory court cannot try cases in areas of law that are not mentioned or suggested in the statute. In this sense, statutory courts are similar to non-judicial adjudicative bodies such as administrative tribunals, boards, and commissions, which are created and given limited power by legislation. The practical implication of this is that a statutory court cannot provide a type of legal remedy or relief that is not expressly or implicitly referred to in its enabling or empowering statute.

== Appointment and removal of judges ==
Judges in Canada are appointed by either the federal government, the provincial governments, or the territorial governments, depending on the court. Judges of the Supreme Court of Canada, the federal courts, and the provincial and territorial superior appellate and trial courts are appointed by the Governor General of Canada, acting on the advice of the federal Cabinet. Judicial appointments to provincial courts of statutory jurisdiction are made by the provincial governments.

Salaries of provincial superior courts are set by Parliament under section 100 of the Constitution Act, 1867, and paid by the federal government. Since the Provincial Judges Reference, salaries for all federally appointed judges are based on recommendations of the Judicial Compensation and Benefits Commission. Similar commissions are established by each province to recommend the salaries for provincially appointed judges, who are paid by the provincial governments.

=== Tenure of judges and removal from the bench ===
Federally appointed judges are eligible to serve on the bench until age 75. In some but not all provincial and territorial courts, appointed judges have tenure until age 70 instead.

Under section 99 of the Constitution Act, 1867, judges of the superior courts of the provinces hold office "during good behaviour, but shall be removable by the Governor General on Address of the Senate and House of Commons". To protect the principle of judicial independence, Parliament has, by statute, delegated authority to investigate complaints against judges and recommend their removal to the Canadian Judicial Council. The Council includes the Chief Justice of Canada, and the chief justice and associate chief justices of each provincial and territorial superior court.

The federal Judges Act outlines the justifiable grounds for removing a federally-appointed judge from office, and allows for complaints against those judges to be made to the Council by any person, including members of the public. The federal Minister of Justice or the attorney general of a province may also request that the Council establish a hearing panel to consider whether a judge of a superior court should be removed.

Judges may only be removed from office for specified reasons, such as infirmity or misconduct, and only where their continuing in office would undermine public confidence in the judge's impartiality, integrity or independence enough that the judge is incapable of executing their role.

The Council provides reports concerning the outcome of complaints and recommendations concerning removal from office to the federal Minister of Justice. To remove a judge from office, the House of Commons and Senate must both pass a resolution.

No superior court judge has been removed from office under section 99 of the Constitution Act, 1867, though on several occasions judges have resigned where it appeared likely that the Senate and House of Commons would pass a resolution seeking their dismissal.

The rules for provincial and territorial judges are similar, but they can be removed under statutory authority of the relevant province or territory.

== Languages used in court ==
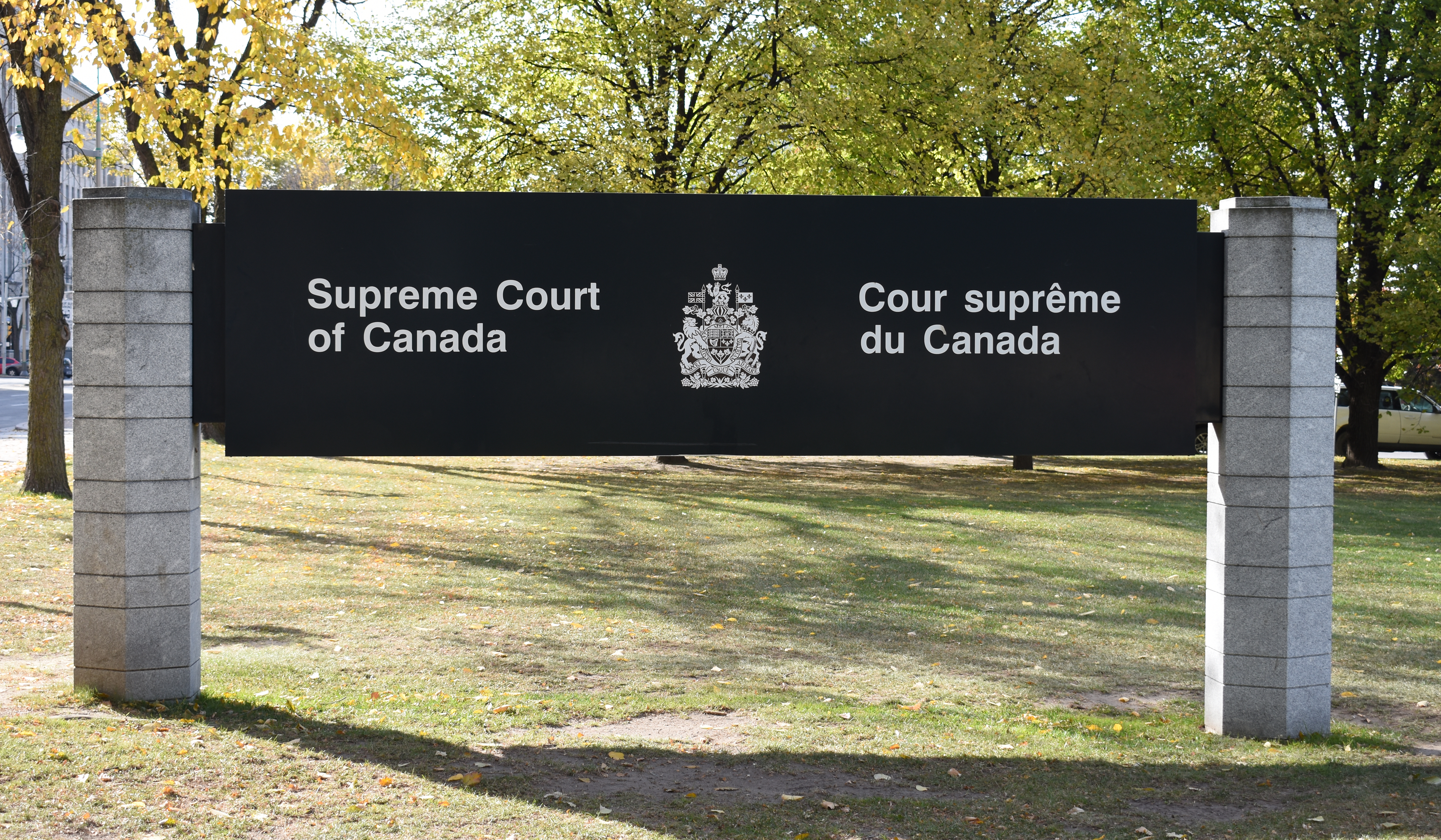
Signage for the supreme court in French and English. Either language may be used in federal courts.

English and French are both official languages of the federal government of Canada. Either official language may be used by any person or in any pleading or process in or issuing from any court established by Parliament under the Constitution Act, 1867. This constitutional guarantee applies to the Supreme Court of Canada, the Federal Court of Appeal, the Federal Court, the Tax Court of Canada and the Court Martial Appeal Court. Parliament has expanded on that constitutional guarantee to ensure the federal courts are institutionally bilingual.

The right to use either language in the provincial and territorial courts varies. The Constitution guarantees the right to use either French or English in the courts of Quebec, Manitoba, and New Brunswick. There is a statutory right to use either English or French in the courts of Ontario, the Northwest Territories, Nunavut, Saskatchewan, and Yukon. There is a limited right to use French in oral submissions in the courts of Alberta.

In the Northwest Territories and Nunavut there is also a statutory right to use official aboriginal languages in court.

As well, in all criminal trials under the federal Criminal Code, every accused has the right to be tried in the official language of their choice, either English or French. This is a broader right than the right to use their own language. It means that the judge, the Crown prosecutor and the court clerks also use that language in the court proceedings. As a result, every court of criminal jurisdiction in Canada, whether federal, provincial or territorial, must have the institutional capacity to provide trials in either language.

Under section 14 of the Canadian Charter of Rights and Freedoms, a party or witness in any proceedings who does not understand or speak the language in which the proceedings are conducted or who is deaf has the right to the assistance of an interpreter.

== Procedure ==
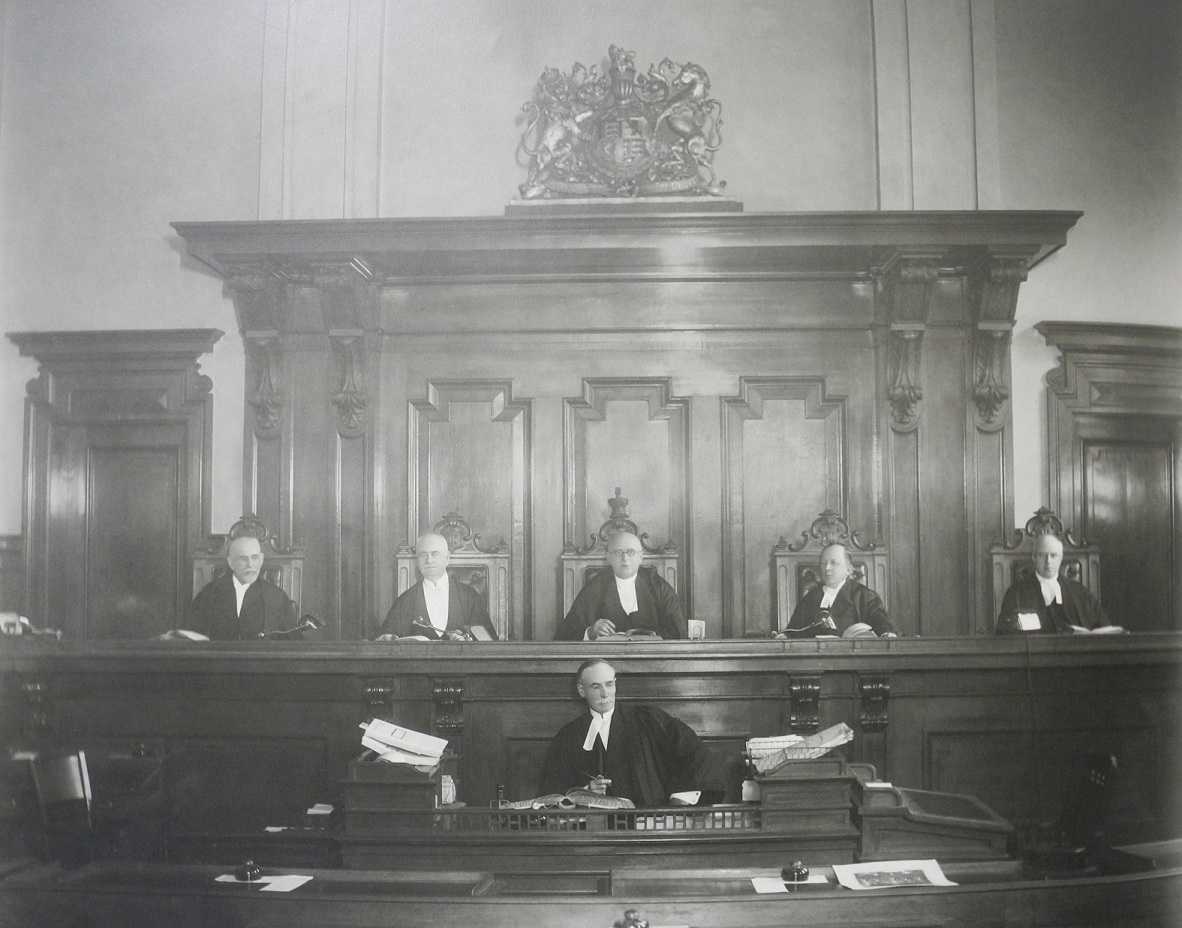
Justices of the Supreme Court of Ontario, with the court clerk seated below the bench. Documents and other forms are evidence is passed to the clerk before being handed to the judge.

- The judicial function of the Royal Prerogative is performed in trust and in the King's name by officers of His Majesty's court, who enjoy the privilege granted conditionally by the sovereign to be free from criminal and civil liability for unsworn statements made within the court. This dispensation extends from the notion in common law that the sovereign "can do no wrong".
- Trial judges typically take a passive role during trial; however, during their charge to the jury, judges may comment upon the value of certain testimony or suggest the appropriate amount of damages in a civil case, although they are required to tell the jury that it is to make its own decision and is not bound to agree with the judge.
- Jury trials are usually reserved for serious criminal cases. The Canadian Charter of Rights and Freedoms provides a constitutional right to a jury trial for any person charged with a crime punishable by imprisonment for five years or more. This right has been expanded by the Criminal Code, which provides that any person charged with an indictable offence has a right to a jury.
- There are no juries in civil cases in the Federal Court or the courts of Quebec, but there are civil juries in the other nine provinces. Only British Columbia and Ontario regularly use juries in civil trials.
- Evidence and documents are not passed directly to the judge, but instead passed to the judge through the court clerk. The clerk, referred to as "Mister/Madam Clerk" or "Mister/Madam Registrar", also wears a robe and sits in front of the judge and faces the lawyers.
- In some jurisdictions, the client sits with the general public, behind counsel's table, rather than beside his or her lawyer at counsel's table. The accused in a criminal trial sits in the prisoners box often located on the side wall opposite the jury, or in the middle of the courtroom. However it is becoming increasingly common for accused persons to sit at counsel table with their lawyers or in the body of the courtroom, particularly when the accused is not in custody.
- In four provinces (British Columbia, Alberta, Manitoba and Ontario), the superior-level courts employ judicial officers known as Masters or Associate Justices who deal with interlocutory motions (or interlocutory applications) in civil cases. In some jurisdictions, Masters may grant final orders in specific types of cases, such as the administration of estates, foreclosures and bankruptcy proceedings. In the Federal Court, an Associate Justice holds a similar positions to that of a Master.

== Court customs ==
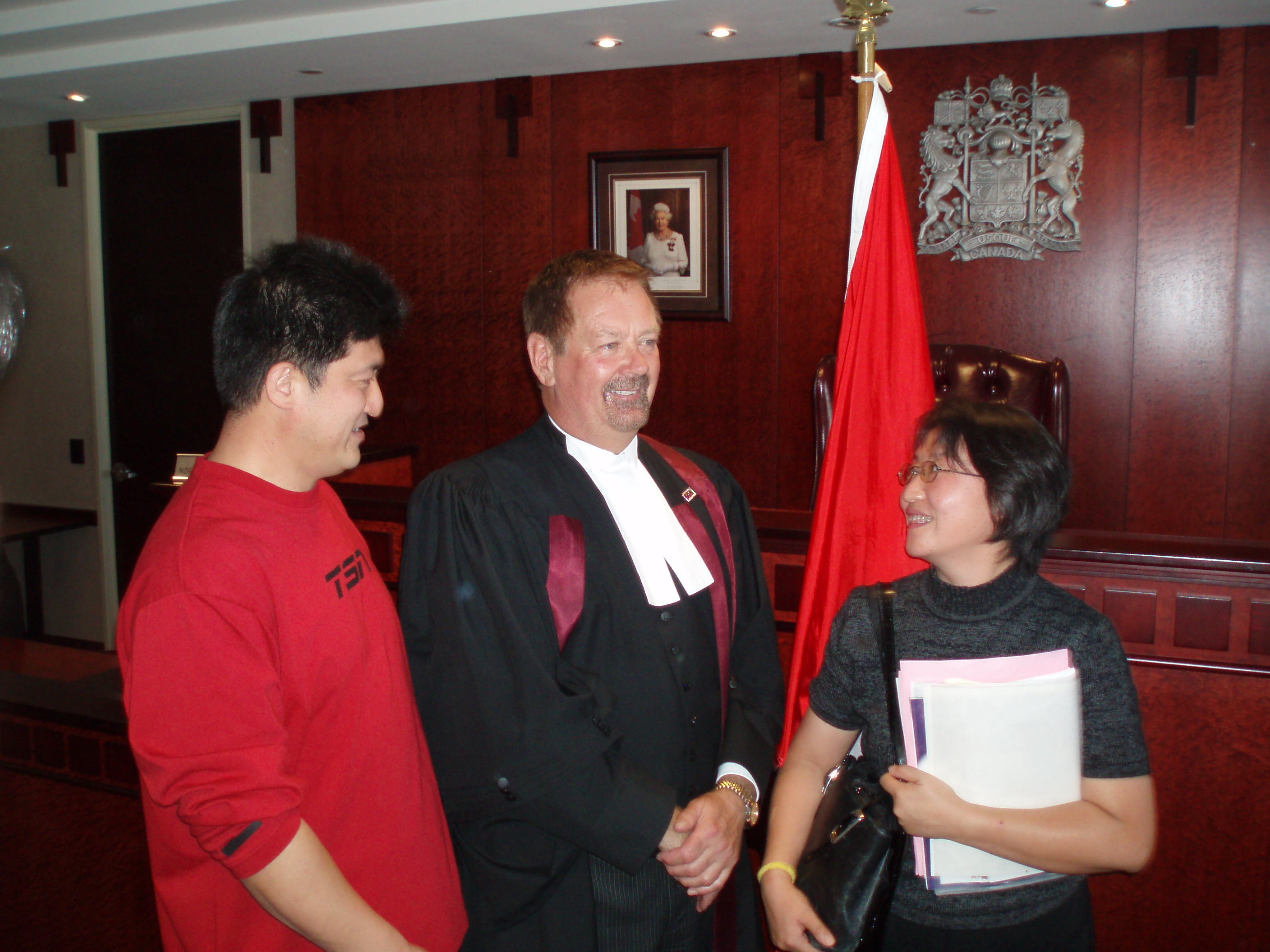
A Canadian courtroom with the arms of Canada, and a photo of the Canadian monarch

Courtroom custom is largely based upon the British tradition, with a few modifications.

=== Symbols ===
Historically, the Crown was said to be the source of justice, with the king personally dispensing justice, a concept that survives in the phrase "the King on the Bench". As a result, in some courtrooms there may be symbols of the Crown, such as a picture of the monarch or the royal Arms of Canada, while some courtrooms may display the provincial arms or a dedicated judicial arms. In the British Columbia courts as well as in the Supreme Court of Newfoundland and Labrador and some courts in Ontario, the Royal coat of arms of the United Kingdom is displayed for reasons of tradition. Many courts display Canadian and provincial flags.

=== Dress ===
In superior courts, lawyers wear black robes, black waistcoats, and white neck tabs, like barristers in the United Kingdom, but they do not wear wigs. Business attire is appropriate when appearing before judges of superior courts sitting in chambers and before judges of provincial or territorial courts or justices of the peace.

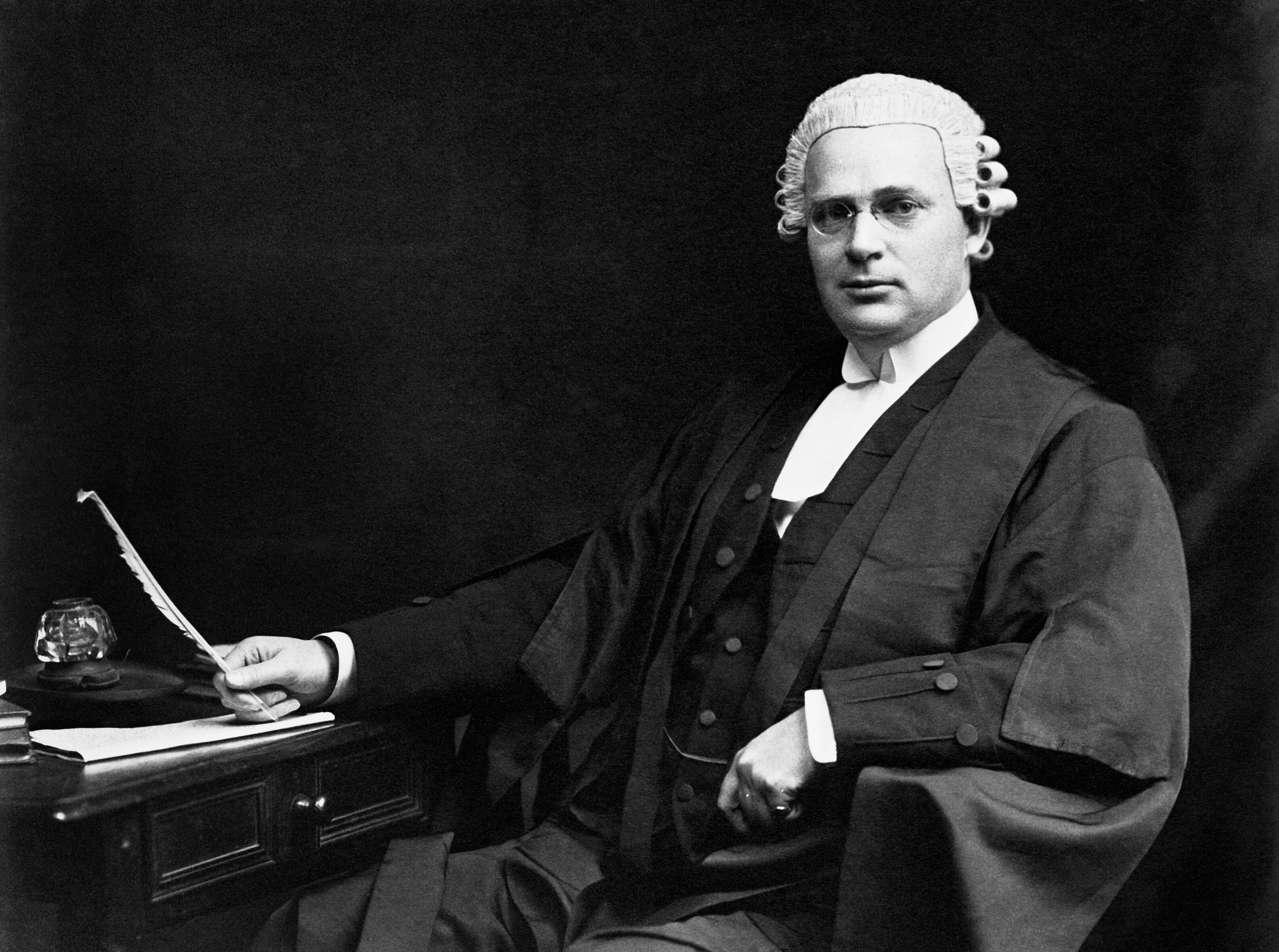
R. B. Bennett, future Prime Minister of Canada, in his barristers gown

Judges dress in robes similar to the robes of barristers. Judges of some courts adorn their robes with coloured sashes. For example, Federal Court Judges' robes are adorned with a gold sash, and Tax Court of Canada Judges' robes with a purple sash.

=== Etiquette/Decorum ===
- Judges do not use gavels. Instead, a judge raises their voice (or stands up if necessary) to restore order in the courtroom.
- In most jurisdictions, when entering or leaving a courtroom when there is a judge seated inside, one should bow, while standing inside the court but near the doorway, in the direction of the seated judge. Many lawyers also bow when crossing the bar.
- Forms of address vary among courts. Judges of superior courts in some provinces are traditionally addressed as "My Lord" or "My Lady," but in other provinces are referred to as "Your Honour". Judges of inferior courts are always traditionally referred to in person as "Your Honour". The practice varies across jurisdictions, with some superior court judges preferring the titles "Mister Justice" or "Madam Justice" to "Lordship". Judges of the Supreme Court of Canada and of the federal-level courts prefer the use of "Mister/Madam (Chief) Justice". Justices of the Peace are addressed as "Your Worship". The French-language style used in Quebec is Madame la Juge / Monsieur le Juge in all levels of court, although some lawyers unofficially say Votre Honneur or Votre Seigneurie (your lordship).
- Judges of inferior courts are referred to as "Judge [Surname]" while judges of superior and federal courts are referred to as "Mister/Madam Justice [Surname]," except in Ontario, where all trial judges in referred to as "Mister/Madam Justice".
- A lawyer advocating in court typically uses "I" when referring to him or herself. The word "we" is not used, even if the lawyer is referring to him/herself and his/her client as a group.
- The judge in court refers to a lawyer as "counsel" (not "counsellor"), or simply "Mr./Ms. [surname]". In Quebec, the title "Maître" is used. In British Columbia, lawyers should inform the Court of the title and pronouns that they, their clients, and other persons present use.
- In court, it is customary for opposing counsel to refer to one another as "my friend", or sometimes (usually in the case of King's Counsel) "my learned friend".
- In any criminal law case, the prosecuting party is "the Crown" while the criminally prosecuted person is called the "accused" (not "defendant," the term used in civil proceedings). The prosecuting lawyer is called "Crown Counsel" (or, in Ontario, "Crown attorney"). Crown counsel in criminal proceedings are customarily addressed and referred to as "Mr. Crown" or "Madam Crown."
- The "versus" or "v." in the style of cause of Canadian court cases is often pronounced "and" (rather than "vee" or "versus" as in the U.S. or "against" in criminal proceedings as in England, Scotland, and Australasia).

== See also ==
- Law of Canada
