= Nunavut Court of Appeal =

- ᓄᓇᕘᒥ ᐅᓐᓂᓗᖅᓴᖅᑐᓄᑦ ᐃᖅᑲᖅᑐᐃᕕᒃ; Nunavunmi Apiqhuidjutainut Uuktuffaarutit; Cour d'appel du Nunavut
- Established: 1999
- Jurisdiction: Nunavut
- Location: Iqaluit
- Composition method: ex officio justices from Nunavut Court of Justice, territorial courts of Yukon and the Northwest Territories, and Court of Appeal of Alberta
- Appeals to: Supreme Court of Canada
- Appeals from: Nunavut Court of Justice
- Website: nunavutcourts.ca/nunavut-court-of-appeal

Chief Justice
- Currently: Dawn Pentelechuk (acting)
- Since: 2026

The Nunavut Court of Appeal (NUCA; Inuktitut: ᓄᓇᕘᒥ ᐅᓐᓂᓗᖅᓴᖅᑐᓄᑦ ᐃᖅᑲᖅᑐᐃᕕᒃ, romanized: Nunavuumi Unniluqsaqtunut Iqkaqtuivik, Inuinnaqtun: Nunavunmi Apiqhuidjutainut Uuktuffaarutit, French: Cour d'appel du Nunavut) is the highest appellate court in the Canadian territory of Nunavut.

Its positions consist of ex officio justices from the Nunavut Court of Justice, the territorial courts of Yukon and the Northwest Territories, and the Court of Appeal of Alberta. The acting Chief Justice of Alberta, currently Dawn Pentelechuk, also serves as the active Chief Justice of the Nunavut Court of Appeal, after the death of the previous Chief Justice Ritu Khullar in September 2026.
