= Court of Appeal for the Northwest Territories =

Canadian court

The Court of Appeal for the Northwest Territories in Canada is the highest appellate court which hears appeals from criminal cases and civil cases of the Supreme Court of the Northwest Territories.

The Court consists of a Chief Justice and justices of appeal which are appointed by the Governor-in-Council from justices of the Court of Appeal of Alberta and Saskatchewan Court of Appeal and the judges and ex officio judges of the Supreme Court of the Northwest Territories.

The Court of Appeal sits in Yellowknife, or, other locations in the Canadian territories or Alberta.

== Judges ==
- The Honourable Justice C. A. Fraser- Chief Justice (Edmonton, Alberta)
- The Honourable Justice R. L. Berger (Edmonton, Alberta)
- The Honourable Justice R. G. Kilpatrick (Iqaluit, Nunavut)
- The Honourable Justice P. T. Costigan (Edmonton, Alberta)
- The Honourable Justice M. S. Paperny (Calgary, Alberta)
- The Honourable Justice R. S. Veale (Whitehorse, Yukon)
- The Honourable Justice E. Johnson (Iqaluit, Nunavut)
- The Honourable Justice P. W. L. Martin (Calgary, Alberta)
- The Honourable Justice L. A. Charbonneau (Yellowknife, Northwest Territories)
- The Honourable Justice J. Watson (Edmonton, Alberta)
- The Honourable Justice F. F. Slatter (Edmonton, Alberta)
- The Honourable Justice P. A. Rowbotham (Calgary, Alberta)
- The Honourable Justice N. A. Sharkey (Iqaluit, Nunavut)
- The Honourable Justice J. D. B. McDonald (Calgary, Alberta)
- The Honourable Justice S. Cooper (Iqaluit, Nunavut)
- The Honourable Justice M. B. Bielby (Edmonton, Alberta)
- The Honourable Justice B. K. O'Ferrall (Calgary, Alberta)
- The Honourable Justice K. M Shaner (Yellowknife, Northwest Territories)
- The Honourable Justice S. H. Smallwood (Yellowknife, Northwest Territories)
- The Honourable Justice A. Mahar (Yellowknife, Northwest Territories)
- The Honourable Justice B. Tulloch (Iqaluit, Nunavut)
- The Honourable Justice B. Veldhuis (Edmonton, Alberta)
- The Honourable Justice T. W. Wakeling (Edmonton, Alberta)
