= Order of precedence in Newfoundland and Labrador =

Relative preeminence of officials for ceremonial purposes

The Newfoundland and Labrador order of precedence is a nominal and symbolic hierarchy of important positions within the province of Newfoundland and Labrador. It has no legal standing but is used to dictate ceremonial protocol at events of a provincial nature.

1. The King in Right of Newfoundland and Labrador (King Charles III)
2. Lieutenant Governor of Newfoundland and Labrador (Her Honour The Honourable Joan Marie Aylward ONL)
3. Premier of Newfoundland and Labrador (Hon. Tony Wakeham)
4. Chief Justice of Newfoundland and Labrador (Deborah Fry)
5. Speaker of the House of Assembly (Paul Lane MHA)
6. Former Lieutenant Governors, in order of their departure from office
  1. Frank Fagan CM ONL
  2. Judy Foote PC ONL
7. Former Premiers, in order of their departure from office
  1. Brian Peckford PC
  2. Tom Rideout
  3. Clyde Wells KC ONL
  4. Brian Tobin PC OC
  5. Beaton Tulk
  6. Roger Grimes CM
  7. Danny Williams KC
  8. Kathy Dunderdale
  9. Tom Marshall KC
  10. Paul Davis
  11. Dwight Ball
  12. Andrew Furey FRCSC
  13. John Hogan KC
8. Members of the Executive Council
9. Leader of the Opposition
10. Members of the King's Privy Council for Canada resident in Newfoundland and Labrador
11. Members of the Cabinet of Canada who represent Newfoundland and Labrador
12. Chief Justice of the Supreme Court of Newfoundland and Labrador
13. Associate Chief Justice of the Supreme Court of Newfoundland and Labrador
14. Puisne justices of the Court of Appeal
15. Justices of the Supreme Court of Newfoundland and Labrador
16. Chief Judge of the Provincial Court
17. Associate Chief Judge of the Provincial Court
18. Puisne judges of the Provincial Court
19. Associate Chief Judge of the Family Court
20. Puisne judges of the Family Court
21. Members of the House of Assembly (precedence governed by date of first election to the Legislature)
22. Members of the Senate who represent Newfoundland and Labrador (precedence governed by date of appointment)
23. Members of the House of Commons who represent Newfoundland and Labrador (precedence governed by date of first election to the House of Commons)
24. Archbishop of St. John's
25. Bishop of Eastern Newfoundland & Labrador
26. Minister of the Presbyterian Church
27. Heads of Consular Post with jurisdiction in the Province of Newfoundland and Labrador (precedence governed by date of exequatur)
  1. Honorary Consulate-General of Ireland
  2. Consul General of France
  3. Consulate General of Portugal
  4. Honorary Consulate of Italy
  5. General Consulate of The Netherlands
  6. Consulate General of Germany
28. Mayor of St. John's
29. Mayor of Corner Brook
30. Mayor of Mount Pearl
31. Mayors or other elected officials of incorporated municipalities (precedence governed alphabetically by municipality name)
32. Recipients of the Victoria Cross resident in Newfoundland and Labrador
33. Commanding Officers (precedence governed by Canadian Armed Forces order of precedence)
  1. CFB Gander
  2. CFB Goose Bay
  3. CFS St. John's
  4. HMCS Cabot
34. Chief of Police, Royal Newfoundland Constabulary
35. Commanding Officer "B" Division, Royal Canadian Mounted Police
36. High Sheriff of Newfoundland and Labrador
37. Members of the Order of Newfoundland and Labrador
38. Chancellor of Memorial University of Newfoundland
39. President and vice-chancellor of Memorial University of Newfoundland
