= Canadian Judicial Council =

National council of the judiciary of Canada

- Conseil canadien de la magistrature
- Formation: 1971; 55 years ago
- Headquarters: Ottawa, Ontario, Canada, K1A 0W8
- Region served: Canada
- Chair: Justice Richard Wagner
- Website: cjc-ccm.ca

The Canadian Judicial Council (CJC; French: Conseil canadien de la magistrature) is the national council of the judiciary of Canada, overseeing the country's federal judges.

The Council has 44 members, composed of chief justices and associate chief justices. It is chaired by the Chief Justice of Canada, currently Justice Richard Wagner.

== History ==
The council was created in 1971 by the Parliament of Canada following years of discussion about the need to coordinate professional development and judicial conduct matters for judges, in a way that would respect the judiciary as an independent branch of government. The review of complaints had previously usually been coordinated by the Department of Justice, with the occasional involvement of local Chief Justices.

=== Landreville case ===
A key factor that facilitated the creation of the council was the case of justice Leo Landreville. He was charged with a criminal offence. Those charges were dismissed, but allegations of impropriety continued to be made by some. This gave rise to quite a bit of public debate; some in the legal profession criticized the fact that the judge was still sitting. A Committee of the Law Society, despite not having jurisdiction over a federally appointed judge, produced a negative report without even notifying Landreville of its proceedings.

There being no defined process to formally inquire into the conduct of a judge, the government then constituted a one-man Royal Commission headed by former Supreme Court Justice Ivan Rand. In his report, Rand found some improprieties and was critical of Justice Landreville. However, some said Mr Rand was biased and famous constitutional lawyer J.J. Robinette who represented Justice Landreville before the Commission was seriously critical of the process.

After the Rand report became public, a joint Committee of Parliament eventually recommended the judge's removal and he resigned.

There were many who came to a view that the process which had been followed was flawed: the absence of a process defined in legislation to review the conduct of a judge left too much room for review by the law societies, government or Parliament, of even other bodies without necessarily involving the judiciary.

Professor William Kaplan, in his book Bad Judgment, wrote that "[w]ithout a doubt, the Landreville case figured prominently in the decision to establish the council." He quotes the Parliamentary Secretary to the Minister of Justice who spoke during second reading of the Bill that created the Council: "Because the independence of the judiciary is an integral part of the Canadian democratic process, it is important that the judiciary become, to some extent, a self-disciplinary body."

According to Martin Friedland, "There is no doubt that the awkwardness and uncertainty of the Landreville proceeding was a factor motivating Parliament to adopt this new procedure."

== Organization and activities ==
The CJC's activities have been characterized as seeking to investigate complaints about judicial misbehaviour and on the other hand protecting the reputation of judges against unfounded accusations.

=== Members ===
The Council has 44 members, composed of chief justices and associate chief justices. It is chaired by the Chief Justice of the Supreme Court of Canada, currently Justice Richard Wagner.

CJC members, as of November 2021
Justice	Jurisdiction	Title
Richard Wagner (Chairperson)	Supreme Court of Canada	Chief Justice of Canada
Ritu Khullar	Court of Appeal of Alberta	Chief Justice of Alberta
Kent Davidson	Court of King's Bench of Alberta	Chief Justice of the Court
Kenneth G. Nielsen	Court of King's Bench of Alberta	Associate Chief Justice of the Court
D. Blair Nixon	Court of King's Bench of Alberta	Associate Chief Justice of the Court
Leonard Marchand	British Columbia Court of Appeal	Chief Justice of British Columbia
Ronald A. Skolrood	Supreme Court of British Columbia	Chief Justice of the Court
Heather J. Holmes	Supreme Court of British Columbia	Associate Chief Justice of the Court
Marianne Rivoalen	Manitoba Court of Appeal	Chief Justice of Manitoba
Glenn Joyal	Court of King's Bench of Manitoba	Chief Justice of the Court
Shane I. Perlmutter	Court of King's Bench of Manitoba	Associate Chief Justice of the Court
Gwen B. Hatch	Court of King's Bench of Manitoba	Associate Chief Justice of the Court, Family Division
J.C. Marc Richard	Court of Appeal of New Brunswick	Chief Justice of New Brunswick
Tracey DeWare	Court of King's Bench of New Brunswick	Chief Justice of the Court
Larry Landry	Court of King's Bench of New Brunswick	Associate Chief Justice of the Court
Deborah E. Fry	Court of Appeal of Newfoundland and Labrador	Chief Justice of Newfoundland and Labrador
Raymond P. Whalen	Supreme Court of Newfoundland and Labrador	Chief Justice of the Trial Division of the Court
Rosalie McGrath	Supreme Court of Newfoundland and Labrador	Associate Chief Justice of the Trial Division of the Court
Shannon Smallwood	Supreme Court of the Northwest Territories	Chief Justice of the Court
Michael J. Wood	Nova Scotia Court of Appeal	Chief Justice of Nova Scotia
Deborah K. Smith	Nova Scotia Supreme Court	Chief Justice of the Court
R. Lester Jesudason	Supreme Court of Nova Scotia	Associate Chief Justice of the Court, Family Division
Patrick J. Duncan	Supreme Court of Nova Scotia	Associate Chief Justice of the Court
Susan Cooper	Nunavut Court of Justice	Acting Chief Justice of the Court
Michael H. Tulloch	Court of Appeal for Ontario	Chief Justice of Ontario
Geoffrey Morawetz	Ontario Superior Court of Justice	Chief Justice of the Court
J. Michal Fairburn	Court of Appeal for Ontario	Associate Chief Justice of Ontario
Faye E. McWatt	Ontario Superior Court of Justice	Associate Chief Justice of the Court
James W. Gormley	Court of Appeal of Prince Edward Island	Chief Justice of Prince Edward Island
Tracey L. Clements	Supreme Court of Prince Edward Island	Chief Justice of the Court
Manon Savard	Quebec Court of Appeal	Chief Justice of Quebec
Marie-Anne Paquette	Superior Court of Quebec	Chief Justice of the Court
Catherine La Rosa	Superior Court of Quebec	Senior Associate Chief Justice of the Court
Jean-Francois Michaud	Superior Court of Quebec	Associate Chief Justice of the Court
Robert Leurer	Court of Appeal for Saskatchewan	Chief Justice of Saskatchewan
Martel D. Popescul	Court of King's Bench for Saskatchewan	Chief Justice of the Court
Michael D. Tochor	Court of King's Bench for Saskatchewan	Associate Chief Justice of the Court
Suzanne M. Duncan	Supreme Court of Yukon	Chief Justice of the Court
Yves de Montigny	Federal Court of Appeal	Chief Justice of the Court
Paul S. Crampton	Federal Court	Chief Justice of the Court
VACANT	Federal Court	Associate Chief Justice of the Court
Gabrielle St-Hilaire	Tax Court of Canada	Chief Justice of the Court
Anick Pelletier	Tax Court of Canada	Associate Chief Justice of the Court
Mary J.L. Gleason	Court Martial Appeal Court of Canada	Chief Justice of the Court

=== Review of Complaints ===
The Canadian Judicial Council was granted power under the Judges Act to investigate complaints made by members of the public or the Attorney General about the conduct of federally appointed judges. After its review and investigation of a complaint, the Council can make recommendations to Parliament through the Minister of Justice that a judge be removed from office.

Canada is one of the very few countries where a complaint can be made against the Chief Justice in the same way as any other judge. The Chief Justice is not involved in the review of complaints.

== List of public inquiries ==
While the majority of complaints are dealt with quickly and without a public hearing, there are some instances where a judge's conduct is considered to be of sufficient concern that further inquiry is warranted.

Since its inception in 1971, the CJC has referred a total of 14 complaints (one involving three judges) to an inquiry committee:

	Name	Inquiry year	Committee recommendation	Outcome
1.	Gordon Hart	1990	Remain	
2.	Malachi Jones	1990	Remain	
3.	Angus MacDonald	1990	Remain	
4.	Fernand L. Gratton	1994	None	Resigned before committee made recommendation
5.	Jean Bienvenue	1996	Removal	Resigned
6.	Robert Flahiff	1999	Removal	Resigned
7.	Bernard Flynn	2003	Remain	
8.	Jean-Guy Boilard	2003	Remain	
9.	Theodore Matlow	2007	Removal	Remained after full panel of CJC recommended he not be removed
10.	Paul Cosgrove	2009	Removal	Resigned
11.	Lori Douglas	2012	None (proceedings stayed)	Decision stayed after Douglas agreed to retire early
11.	Michel Déziel	2015	Remain	
12	Michel Girouard	2016	Removal	Full panel of CJC recommended he not be removed
13.	Robin Camp	2016	Removal	Resigned, after the Minister of Justice sought to remove Justice Camp from the bench
14.	Michel Girouard	2017	Removal	A re-hearing of the first inquiry conducted in 2016. The full council voted 23–3 in favour of recommending to the Minister of Justice to remove Justice Girouard from office on February 20, 2018. Resigned after appeals failed.
15.	Frank Newbould	2017	None (proceedings stayed)	Justice Newbould retired from office before the proceedings of the Inquiry Committee began.

== Criticisms ==
=== Limited removals ===
In its 40-year history, the CJC has only ordered 11 public inquiries and only twice recommended that a judge be removed from the bench. In the 145 years since Confederation, only five superior court judges have been recommended for removal from the bench. All but one resigned before being removed.

The CJC has declined to recommend removal even in cases where there was a finding of inappropriate conduct. In 2008, a CJC inquiry panel recommended removing Ontario Superior Court Justice Theodore Matlow from the bench, but a majority of the full CJC overruled the removal recommendation despite agreeing there was misconduct. Rocco Galati criticized the difficulty of removing judges, saying that "it's easier to get a constitutional amendment than to remove a judge."

After a full panel of the CJC ignored its committee recommendation and recommended that Quebec judge Michel Girouard should remain on the bench, federal Justice Minister Jody Wilson-Raybould and Quebec Justice Minister Stéphanie Vallée ordered the CJC to reconsider its decision.

The CJC has said that misconduct should not guarantee the judge's removal, and the gravity of the misconduct must be determined. Osgoode Hall Law School professor Trevor Farrow said that the rarity of removals reflects the high value that is placed on independence for judges in Canada.

=== Makeup of CJC ===
The CJC is composed only of judges. Galati criticized the makeup of the CJC, pointing out that judges are the only truly self-regulating profession in Canada, and has urged public participation in the process. Osgoode Hall Law School professor Allan Hutchison argued that the CJC should include members of the public, and criticized the hypocrisy of judges calling for natural justice in other professions. University of Calgary Faculty of Law professor and Canadian Association for Legal Ethics president Alice Wooley said including laypersons in the CJC would ensure that the process is less insular and more transparent.

=== Secrecy ===
In September 2003, the Canadian Justice Review Board, a non-governmental advocacy group and "coalition of citizens," expressed concern that the CJC is too secretive. Wooley criticized the CJC for not clearly articulating what constituted misconduct worthy of sanctions.

=== Range of sanctions ===
Some critics have pointed out that the only available sanction of removal may not be appropriate in some circumstances.
