= High Sheriff of Newfoundland and Labrador =

Law enforcement agency for NL courts

Office of the High Sheriff of Newfoundland and Labrador
- Common name: High Sheriff of Newfoundland

Agency overview
- Formed: 1729

Jurisdictional structure
- Operations jurisdiction: Newfoundland and Labrador, Canada
- The area served by the High Sheriff of Newfoundland and Labrador
- Population: 526,702
- Legal jurisdiction: Provincial
- Governing body: His Majesty in Right of Newfoundland
- Constituting instrument: Sheriff's Act, 1991 (SNL 1991 c. 39)

Operational structure
- Overseen by: Minister of Justice and Public Safety
- Headquarters: St. John's Court House
- Elected officer responsible: John Hogan
- Agency executive: Derek Peddle

The Office of the High Sheriff of Newfoundland and Labrador is a provincial law enforcement agency overseen by the Minister of Justice and Public Safety in the province of Newfoundland and Labrador, Canada. Founded in 1729, it is the oldest law enforcement agency in Canada. Sheriffs are provincial peace officers appointed under the Sheriff's Act, 1991 with authority to enforce all relevant federal and provincial acts including the criminal code throughout Newfoundland and Labrador while in the lawful execution of their duties.

== Duties ==
The Office of High Sheriff of Newfoundland and Labrador provides protection and enforcement duties in support of the provincial, supreme, and appeal courts in the province. The sheriffs also assists local law enforcement agencies with additional resources to ensure public safety under the provincial Emergency Services Division.

The High Sheriff is primarily responsible for providing administrative and enforcement services to the Supreme Court of Newfoundland and the Provincial Court. The Office of the High Sheriff administers the jury system, provides court security and executes orders and decisions of the court. Sheriff officers act in the name of the High Sheriff in accordance with directions given them and the law. They include bailiffs, deputy sheriffs, and all other civilian employees and staff of the Office of the High Sheriff. Sheriff's Officers have both the power and the duty to carry out orders of the Court. They are peace officers under the Criminal Code of Canada and have all the powers and protection of law enforcement officers.

== Organisational structure ==
The Office of High Sheriff is divided into two sections: Court Security and Judgement Enforcement.

=== Court Security ===
Court Security is responsible for transporting prisoners from all provincial court buildings, His Majesty's Penitentiary, other correctional centres, and police holding cells, and the Waterford Hospital. Court Security holds and monitor prisoners in secure cell blocks before their attendance in court, and provides security in the courthouse, courtrooms and at the secure entrances to the courthouses. Sheriffs are responsible for executing court orders.

Sheriffs perform these duties at all 14 Provincial Court of Newfoundland and Labrador courthouses, including the Supreme Court of Newfoundland, Newfoundland Court of Appeal, Trial Division, Family Division, Traffic Court, and Small Claims Court. In addition, Court Security sheriffs provide security at 15 circuit courts throughout the province.

=== Judgment Enforcement ===
The Judgment Enforcement section collects and disburses trust monies received from court orders and is responsible for collection of fees as outlined in legislation. Sheriffs are responsible for executing court orders. Out-of-province prisoner escorts are completed by Judgment Enforcement sheriffs.
