= Commissioner for Federal Judicial Affairs =

Canadian government judicial support agency

Federal Commissioner for Judicial Affairs
- Commissaire à la Magistrature Fédérale
- Incumbent; Marc Giroux since June 21, 2017
- Office of the Commissioner of Federal Judicial Affairs Canada
- Abbreviation: FJA
- Reports to: Minister of Justice and Attorney General of Canada
- Appointer: Governor in Council
- Constituting instrument: Judges Act
- Salary: $183,600 (GCQ-6)

Office of the Commissioner for Federal Judicial Affairs Canada
- Commissariat à la magistrature fédérale Canada

Agency overview
- Formed: 1978
- Headquarters: Ottawa, Ontario, Canada
- Employees: 60
- Annual budget: $595.5 million (2019)
- Website: https://www.fja.gc.ca/home-accueil/index-eng.html

The Commissioner for Federal Judicial Affairs (French: Commissaire à la magistrature fédérale) is a support agency within the Canadian Department of Justice. FJA acts an arms-length agency from the Department of Justice and provides support for the federal judiciary, including:

- Administration of Part I of the Judges Act including salaries, allowances, pensions and benefits for judges and their spouses
- Supporting and administering a judicial intranet (JUDICOM) to allow for secure communication and information sharing
- Language training for Judges
- Publication of all Federal Court decisions in both official languages

== Judicial Appointments Secretariat ==
Through its Judicial Appointments Secretariat FJA provides support for appointments of judges in provincial superior courts, federal courts, military courts and Supreme Court of Canada.

FJA Administers of the vetting and evaluation process through a series of 17 advisory committees. Committee members are appointed for a two-year term by the Governor-in-Council, which may be renewed at the federal government's discretion.

=== Appointment of Military Judges ===
Military Judges are appointed pursuant to the National Defence Act by the Governor in Council on the advice of the Minister of National Defence.

Similar to the appointment of civilian judges, candidates are vetted and evaluated by a committee consisting of members of the Canadian Armed forces and the legal community.

==== Qualitification ====
Military Judges must have been both officer of the Canadian Armed Forces and a practicing barrister within any province for a period of 10 years in order to be qualified as a candidate.

== JUDICOM ==
FJA administers and maintains the Judicial Communications Network (JUDICOM), a private secure intranet used by the federal judiciary to facilitate communication and collaboration.

== Federal Court Reports ==
FJA is responsible for publishing decisions of the Federal Court and the Federal Court of Appeal. Selected decisions are published in both official languages. Decisions are searchable in an online archive.

== See also ==
Judicial Appointments in Canada
