= Francis Forbes =

Australian judge

Sir Francis Forbes
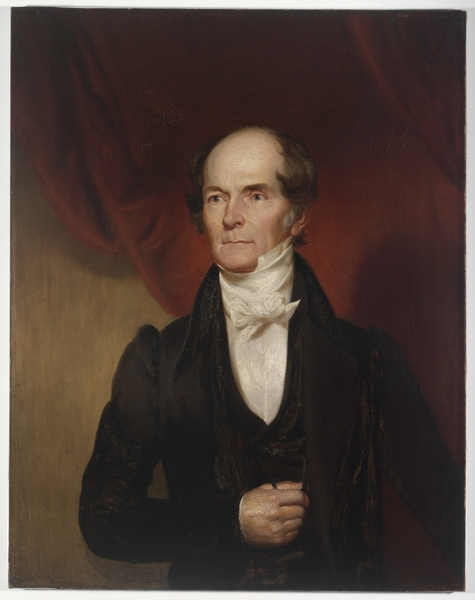
- Francis Forbes (artist unknown)

Chief Justice of New South Wales
- In office 1824–1837
- Preceded by: New position
- Succeeded by: James Dowling

Chief Justice of Newfoundland
- In office 1816–1822
- Preceded by: Caesar Colclough
- Succeeded by: Richard Alexander Tucker

Personal details
- Born: Francis William Forbes; 1784 Bermuda
- Died: 8 November 1841 (aged 56–57) Newtown, New South Wales, Australia

Sir Francis William Forbes (1784 – 8 November 1841) was a Chief Justice of Newfoundland, and the first Chief Justice of New South Wales.

== Early life ==
Forbes was born and educated in Bermuda, the son of Dr. Francis Forbes M.D. and his wife Mary, née Tucker. His elder half-brother was Very Rev Patrick Forbes who was Moderator of the General Assembly of the Church of Scotland in 1829.

At the age of 19 Francis travelled to London, England to study law at Lincoln's Inn. He was called to the Bar in 1812 and became a Crown Law Officer in Bermuda and married Amelia Sophia Grant in 1813, returning to England in 1815.

== Newfoundland ==
In 1816 he was invited to be Chief Justice of Newfoundland, and was sworn in at St. John's in July, 1816. While in Newfoundland, he severely curtailed the powers of the naval governors. In 1820, he wrote the lyrics of the song "The Banks of Newfoundland". Poor health and three severe winters forced Forbes to return to London to recuperate in 1822. Rather than return to Newfoundland’s maritime climate, Forbes accepted a position as Chief Justice of New South Wales and Van Diemen’s Land.

== New South Wales ==
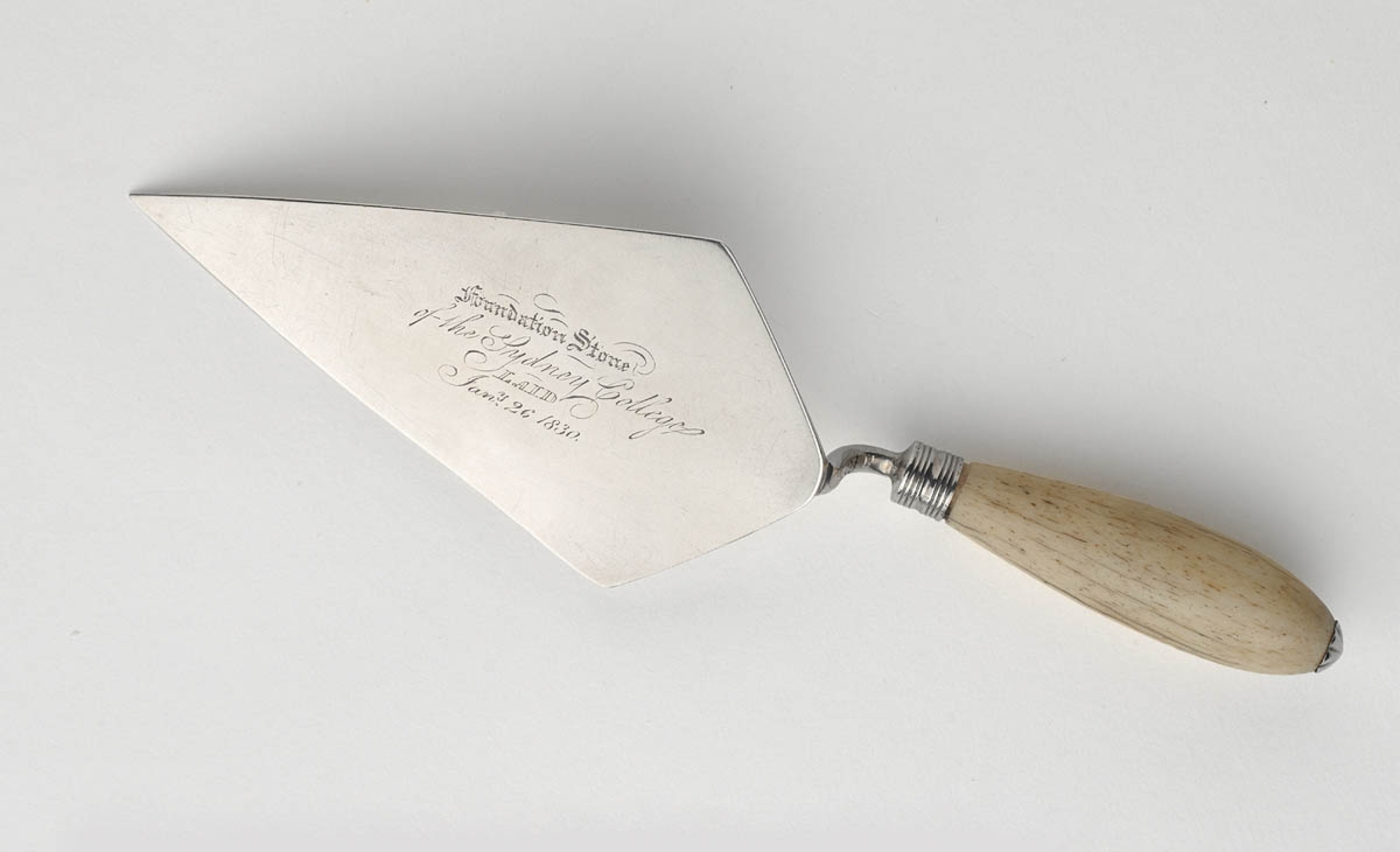
This trowel was used by the first Chief Justice of NSW, Sir Francis Forbes, to lay the foundation stone of the non-denominational Sydney College on 26 January 1830. The stone was then '...allowed to lie alone like a solitary egg in a deserted nest for 18 months thereafter...' [Dow, 1974]. Sydney College closed in 1847, but was reconstituted as Sydney Grammar School in 1857.

In 1822, he was appointed to be Chief Justice of the Supreme Court of New South Wales, to oversee the reform of the administration of the legal system in the colony, following the inquiry into the colony's affairs by commissioner John Bigge. Before departing for Australia, he helped draft the New South Wales Act 1823 (4 Geo. 4. c. 96) which, along with the Charter of Justice issued under it on 13 October 1823, replaced the legal tribunals of convict days with a Supreme Court possessing comprehensive jurisdiction. Under the new system, Forbes was not only the sole judge, subject only to the appellate power of the Governor, but also an ex officio member of the Executive Council and the Legislative Council, and all colonial legislation had to be certified by him as not being repugnant to the laws of England.

Forbes also championed the introduction of trial by jury in NSW. On 14 October 1824, in the court of Quarter Sessions (so named because they met four times per year), 12 men who had not been convicts were sworn in as the first jurors. There was intense opposition from the magistrates to this initiative as they had formerly ruled on all the criminal trials in these courts.

Forbes was also a strong advocate for free education. In 1830 he laid the foundation stone for the non-denominational Sydney College (now Sydney Grammar School), having spent the previous five years chairing the committee for its establishment. He remained as chairman of the board of trustees when the school finally opened in 1835 in College Street near Hyde Park.

== Later life ==
Forbes' heavy workload and conflict with Governor Darling led him to take 12 months sick leave in 1836-37. While supposedly convalescing in England, Forbes agreed to give evidence at the Molesworth Committee on Transportation. This committee was reviewing the transportation of convicts to the Australian colonies. He spoke forcefully against the practice of internal transportation, whereby convicts who misbehaved were sent to secondary prisons such as Norfolk Island. While not directly opposing the convict system, he tried to argue for a more humane and less harsh method of punishment.

Early in 1837, Forbes' received the news that he would be given a knighthood. After recovering from two bouts of influenza, he made it to St James Palace on 5 April 1837 to be dubbed by King William IV. Francis Forbes, the boy from Bermuda with a rich Scottish heritage and a passion for justice returned to Australia as Sir Francis Forbes.

Given all this activity, it is not surprising that the time Forbes spent on sick leave in England did not help him regain his strength. He even tried ‘taking the waters’ at a variety of spa resorts in France and Italy, but to no avail. He felt like he was "sinking under the weight" of his office and his hand shook as he tried to write his resignation letter. (see ML MSS 403/6, 135 at 137).

After spending time in England and Europe, he admitted that his "nerves [were] so shattered as to affect my powers of mind as well as body". He retired as Chief Justice of New South Wales on 1 July 1837. His dream of a comfortable retirement at ‘Edinglassie’, a rural retreat he built on his property in the Nepean, was never realised as he needed to be close to his doctors.

Forbes died in a rented house, "Leitrim Lodge", in Newtown, New South Wales, on 8 November 1841. He was only 57 years old. He was survived by his mother, his wife – Lady Amelia, and their two sons who were studying at Cambridge in England.

== Legacy ==
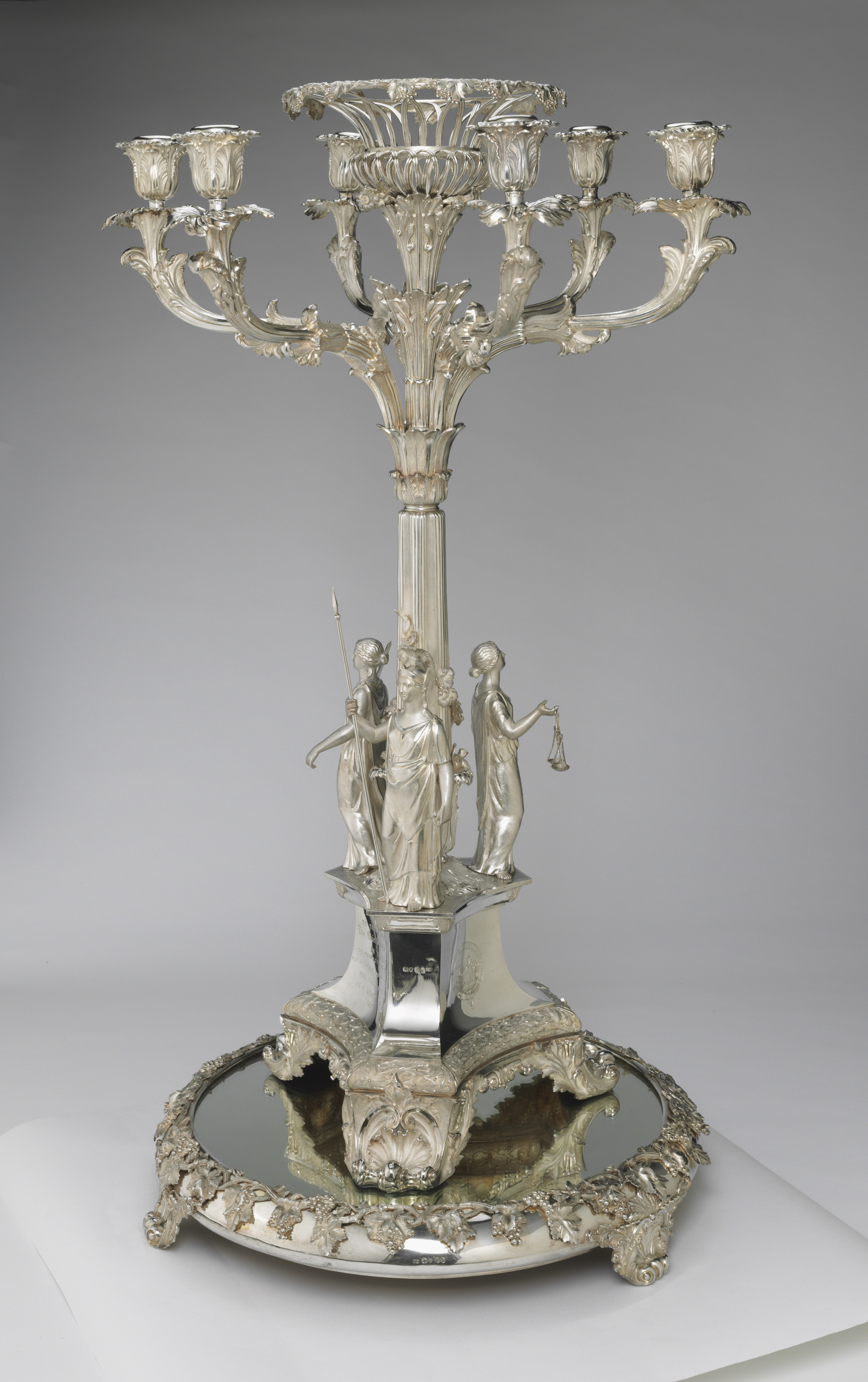
The candelabrum was presented to the Chief Justice of New South Wales by the colonists. One side of the base is engraved as follows: 'To the Honorable the Chief Justice Forbes in token of respect and esteem for his public and private virtues. The colonists of New South Wales 1836.' Below this is engraved the silversmith's name 'B. Smith Duke St. Linn. [i.e. Lincoln's] Inn Fields'.

The town of Forbes in central New South Wales is named after him.

The Francis Forbes Society for Australian Legal History, based in Sydney, is named after him.

Mount Forbes in Queensland is named after him, but the name originally referred to the mountain now known as Mount Walker, Queensland while the Mount Forbes name is now assigned to an adjacent locality.

Forbes Street in Darlinghurst is named after him.

The State Library of New South Wales holds a candelabrum that was given to Forbes by "the colonists of New South Wales" in 1839 after he retired. It was given with words of high praise:

"Nothing but the highest moral firmness and integrity, combined with that genius and learning for which you are so eminently distinguished, could have overcome the opposition and difficulties which you have had to encounter."

These grateful "colonists" had raised the mighty sum of 260 pounds, 5 shillings and 6 pence (at least AUS$33,000 in 2016 money) through public donations. There being a dearth of silversmiths in the new colony, they commissioned Benjamin Smith the second, a London-based silversmith to create this elaborate piece. It weighs over 11 kg and is made of brushed and polished silver.

== See also ==
- List of judges of the Supreme Court of New South Wales

Legal offices
Preceded by New position	Chief Justice of New South Wales; 1824–1837	Succeeded by James Dowling
Preceded by Caesar Colclough	Chief Justice of Newfoundland; 1816–1822	Succeeded by Richard Alexander Tucker
