= National Post =

Canadian national daily newspaper

- Right to the Point

- The front of the redesigned National Post, September 28, 2007
- Type: Daily newspaper
- Format: Broadsheet
- Owner: Postmedia Network
- Founder: Conrad Black
- Editor-in-chief: Rob Roberts
- Founded: October 27, 1998; 28 years ago
- Language: English
- Headquarters: Toronto, Ontario, Canada
- Circulation: 142,509 Tue–Fri; 132,116 Saturday (March 2013)
- ISSN: 1486-8008
- Website: nationalpost.com

The National Post is a Canadian English-language broadsheet newspaper and the flagship publication of the American-owned Postmedia Network. It is published Mondays through Saturdays, with Monday released as a digital edition only. The newspaper is distributed in the provinces of Ontario, Quebec, Alberta and British Columbia. Weekend editions of the newspaper are also distributed in Manitoba and Saskatchewan. The National Post, alongside The Globe and Mail, is one of Canada's two national newspapers.

The newspaper was founded in 1998 by Conrad Black in an attempt to compete with The Globe and Mail. In 2001, CanWest completed its acquisition of the National Post. In 2006, the newspaper ceased distribution in Atlantic Canada and the Canadian territories. Postmedia assumed ownership of the newspaper in 2010, after the CEO of the National Post's, Paul Godfrey, assembled an ownership group to acquire CanWest's chain of newspapers.

== History ==
Conrad Black built the National Post around the Financial Post, a financial newspaper in Toronto which Hollinger Inc. purchased from Sun Media in 1997. Originally slated for an October 5, 1998 launch date, the debut of the paper was delayed until October 27 because of financial complications that stemmed from Black's acquisition of the Financial Post, which was retained as the name of the new newspaper's business section.

Outside Toronto, the Post was built on the printing and distribution infrastructure of Hollinger's national newspaper chain, formerly called Southam Newspapers, that included the newspapers Ottawa Citizen, Montreal Gazette, Edmonton Journal, Calgary Herald, and Vancouver Sun. The Post became Black's national flagship title, and Ken Whyte was appointed editor.

Beyond his political vision, Black attempted to compete directly with Kenneth Thomson's media empire led in Canada by The Globe and Mail, which Black and many others perceived as the platform of the Liberal establishment.

When the Post launched, its editorial stance was conservative. It advocated a "unite-the-right" movement to create a viable alternative to the Liberal government of Jean Chrétien, and supported the Canadian Alliance. The Post's op-ed page has included dissenting columns by ideological liberals such as Linda McQuaig, as well as conservatives including Mark Steyn and Diane Francis, and David Frum. Original members of the Post editorial board included Ezra Levant, Neil Seeman, Jonathan Kay, Conservative Member of Parliament John Williamson and the author/historian Alexander Rose.

The Post's magazine-style graphic and layout design has won awards. The original design of the Post was created by Lucie Lacava, a design consultant based in Montreal. The Post now bears the motto "World's Best-Designed Newspaper" on its front page.

=== 21st century ===
The Post was unable to maintain momentum in the market without continuing to operate with annual budgetary deficits. At the same time, Conrad Black was becoming preoccupied by his debt-heavy media empire, Hollinger International. Black divested his Canadian media holdings, and sold the Post to CanWest Global Communications Corp, controlled by Israel "Izzy" Asper, in two stages – 50 percent in 2000, along with the entire Southam newspaper chain, and the remaining 50 percent in 2001. CanWest Global also owned the Global Television Network.

Izzy Asper died in October 2003, and his sons Leonard and David Asper assumed control of CanWest, the latter serving as chairman of the Post. Editor-in-chief Matthew Fraser departed in 2005. Fraser's deputy editor, Doug Kelly succeeded him as editor. Pyette departed seven months after his arrival, replaced by Gordon Fisher.

The Post limited print distribution in Atlantic Canada in 2006, part of a trend to which The Globe and Mail and the Toronto Star, Canada's other two papers with inter-regional distribution, have all resorted. Print editions were removed from all Atlantic Canadian newsstands except in Halifax as of 2007. Focussing further on its online publishing, in 2008, the paper suspended weekday editions and home delivery in Manitoba and Saskatchewan. The reorientation towards digital continued into its next decade.

Politically, the Post has retained a conservative editorial stance, although the Asper family has long been a strong supporter of the Liberal Party of Canada. Izzy Asper was once leader of the Liberal Party in his home province of Manitoba. The Aspers had controversially dismissed the publisher of the Ottawa Citizen, Russell Mills, for calling for the resignation of Liberal prime minister Jean Chrétien.

However, the Post endorsed the Conservative Party of Canada in the 2004 election when Fraser was editor. The Conservatives narrowly lost that election to the Liberals. After the election, the Post surprised many of its conservative readers by shifting its support to the victorious Liberal government of prime minister Paul Martin, and was highly critical of the Conservatives and their leader, Stephen Harper. The paper switched camps again in the runup to the 2006 election (in which the Conservatives won a minority government).

Like its competitor The Globe and Mail, the Post publishes a separate edition in Toronto, Ontario, Canada's largest city and the fourth largest English-language media centre in North America after New York City, Los Angeles and Chicago. The Toronto edition includes additional local content not published in the edition distributed to the rest of Canada, and is printed at the Toronto Star Press Centre in Vaughan.

On September 27, 2007, the Post unveiled a major redesign of its appearance. Guided by Gayle Grin, the Post's managing editor of design and graphics, the redesign features a standardization in the size of typeface and the number of typefaces used, cleaner font for charts and graphs, and the move of the nameplate banner from the top to the left side of Page 1 as well as each section's front page.

In 2009, the paper announced that as a temporary cost-cutting measure, it would not print a Monday edition from July to September 2009. On October 29, 2009, Canwest Global announced that due to a lack of funding, the National Post might close down as of October 30, 2009, subject to moving the paper to a new holding company. Late on October 29, 2009, Ontario Superior Court Justice Sarah Pepall ruled in Canwest's favour and allowed the paper to move into a holding company. Investment bankers hired by Canwest received no offers when they tried to sell the National Post earlier that year. Without a buyer closing the paper was studied, but the costs were greater than gains from liquidating assets. The lawyer for Canwest, in arguing to Justice Pepall, said the National Post added value to other papers in the Canwest chain.

In 2010, an ownership group was assembled by National Post CEO Paul Godfrey in 2010 to bid for the chain of newspapers being sold by the financially troubled Canwest (the company's broadcasting assets were sold separately to Shaw Communications). Godfrey secured financial backing from U.S. private-equity firm Golden Tree Asset Management as well as other investors. The group completed a $1.1 billion transaction to acquire the chain from Canwest on July 13, 2010, forming the Postmedia Network. The company's shares were listed on the Toronto Stock Exchange in 2011. On October 28, 2011, the Post announced its first ever yearly profit. In 2016, Chatham Asset Management acquired a 66 per cent stake in the Postmedia Network, resulting in the reduction in their staff, including a third of the National Post's editorial staff.

In 2024, the National Post published two articles in which it advocated for the Russian documentary film Russians at War. The first article by columnist Chris Selley introduced the claim that this film showed the human face of the Russians and was therefore banned. This statement was later used by the magazine Die Weltwoche and other media to which cinematographer Anastasia Trofimova gave interviews to defend her film after it had been banned from the Zurich film festival. In the second article by Chris Knight, "Russian-Canadian filmmaker battles attempts to suppress controversial film as Ukraine launches probe", the idea was taken further, claiming a Ukrainian campaign against the film, whereas in reality the film was widely criticized by the international press and others.

== Facilities ==
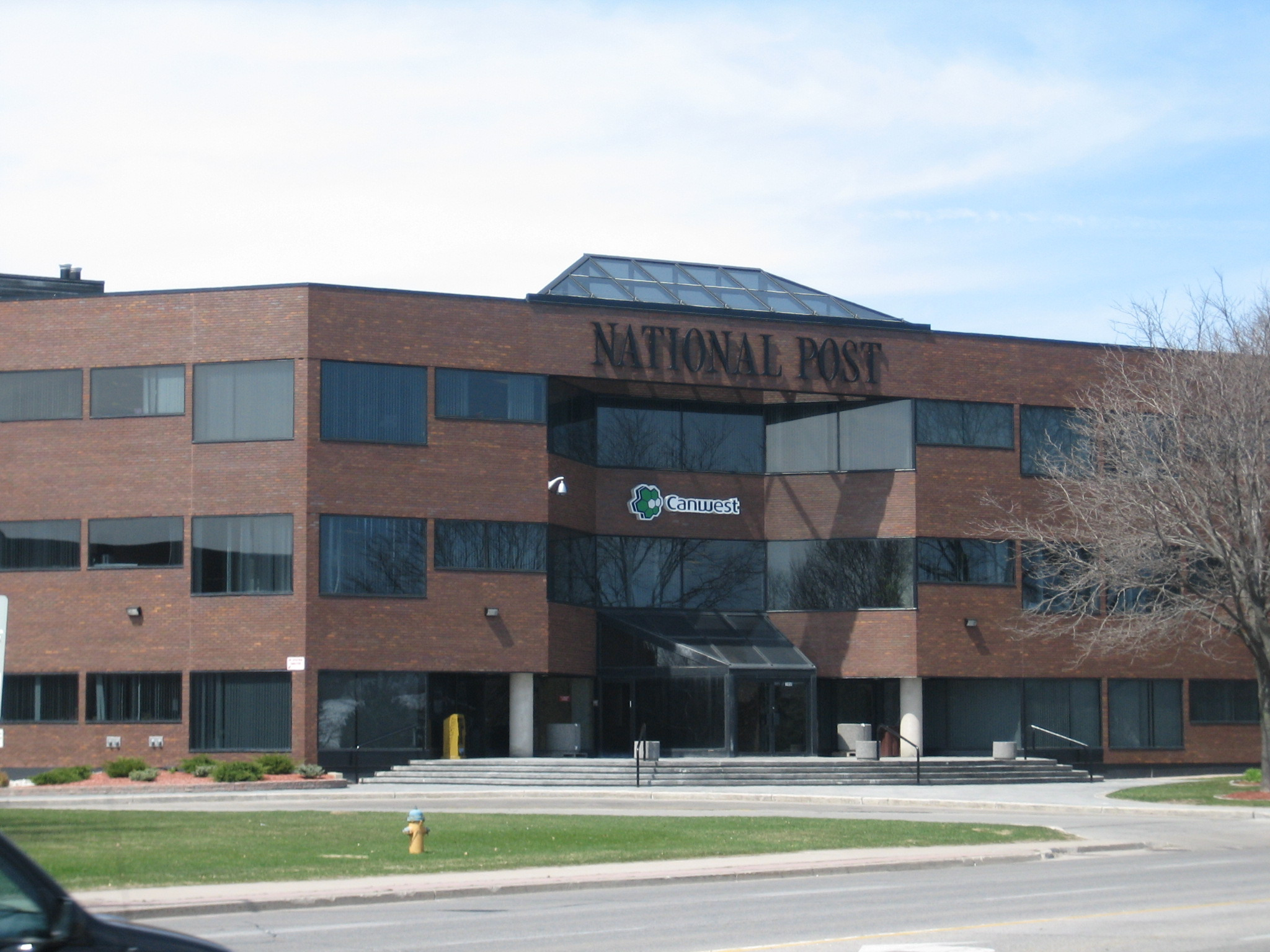
The former National Post building in Don Mills, 2009

The National Post's main office is at 365 Bloor Street East in Toronto, Ontario. It was formerly located at 1450 Don Mills Road in the Don Mills neighbourhood of Toronto, which was vacated in 2012.

The newspaper is published at Postmedia's Islington Printing Plant in Toronto's Rexdale neighbourhood, along with the Toronto Sun, London Free Press and various Postmedia and Metroland-owned weekly newspapers. The newspaper was previously printed at the Toronto Star Press Centre in Vaughan, Ontario, until the Toronto Star closed the site.

== Notable staff ==
=== Editors-in-chief ===
- Kenneth Whyte, 1998–2003
- Matthew Fraser, 2003–2005
- Doug Kelly, 2005–2010
- Stephen Meurice, 2010–2014
- Anne Marie Owens, 2014–2019
- Rob Roberts, 2019–

=== Staff ===
- Nicole MacAdam, executive producer, Financial Post
- Terence Corcoran, FP comment editor
- Andrew Coyne, executive producer, comment & editorial (2014–2015)
- Diane Francis, FP editor-at-large

=== Columnists ===
The following is a list of past and present columnists for the National Post.

==== Current ====
- Conrad Black (founder)
- Terence Corcoran – with Financial Post
- Raymond J. de Souza
- Diane Francis – with Financial Post
- Lorne Gunter
- Larysa Harapyn – with Financial Post
- John Ivison
- Barbara Kay
- Lawrence Solomon
- Jordan Peterson
- Chris Selley

==== Former ====
- Dave Bidini
- Scott Burnside
- Christie Blatchford
- Andrew Coyne
- David Frum
- Robert Fulford
- George Jonas
- Jonathan Kay
- Tasha Kheiriddin
- Charles Krauthammer
- Faisal Kutty
- Rex Murphy
- Steve Murray
- John O'Sullivan
- Rosemary Sexton
- Mireille Silcoff
- Mark Steyn
- Robyn Urback
- George Will
- Brett Wilson

== Criticism ==
=== 2006 Iran hoax ===
On May 19, 2006, the newspaper ran two pieces alleging that the Iranian parliament had passed a law requiring religious minorities to wear special identifying badges. One piece was a front-page news item titled "Iran Eyes Badges For Jews" accompanied by a 1935 picture of two Jews bearing Nazi-ordered yellow badges. Later on the same day, experts began coming forward to deny the accuracy of the Post story. The story proved to be false, but not before it had been picked up by a variety of other news media and generated comment from world leaders. Comments on the story by the Canadian Prime Minister Stephen Harper caused Iran to summon Canada's ambassador to Tehran, Gordon E. Venner, for an explanation.

On May 24, 2006, the editor-in-chief of the newspaper, Doug Kelly, published an apology for the story on page 2, admitting that it was false and the National Post had not exercised enough caution or checked enough sources.

=== Accusation of anti-Islam sentiment ===
From 1998 to 2014, the now defunct Canadian Islamic Congress (CIC) had been actively monitoring media coverage for anti-Muslim or anti-Islam sentiment and had issued reports highlighting its findings. It had opposed the use of phrases such as "Islamic guerrillas," "Islamic insurgency" and "Muslim militants" saying that terms like "militant" or "terrorist" should be used without a religious association "since no religion teaches or endorses terrorism, militancy or extremism." The Congress had singled out the National Post, saying the paper "consistently is No. 1" as an anti-Islam media outlet.

=== Allegations of bias ===
The advocacy group Canadians for Justice and Peace in the Middle East has accused the Post of pro-Israel bias for publishing articles from the Jewish News Syndicate which it describes as "a mouthpiece for the Israeli military".

=== Climate change coverage ===
In a 2021 academic study on the presentation of the subject of climate change in 17 mainstream media outlets in the UK, US, Canada, Australia and New Zealand, the National Post came out as the worst in terms of its misrepresentation of the scientific consensus on the impact of anthropogenic climate change. The National Post was found to represent scientific consensus only 70.83% of the time—noting the significant contribution of anthropogenic climate change—while 9.17% of the time it presented anthropogenic climate change and natural climatic variance as equally relevant, and 20% of the time presented anthropogenic climate change as a negligible phenomena.

=== Institute for Canadian Values ad controversy ===
On September 24, 2011, the newspaper ran an advertisement paid for by the Institute for Canadian Values (ICV) which was hosted by Canada Christian College. The advertisement argued against the teaching of LGBTQ-related sex education topics in the Ontario school curriculum, and was criticized for alleged discrimination against transsexual, transgender, intersex, and two-spirited people. Following the controversy, the National Post apologized for the advertisement on September 30 and withdrew the ad from circulation.

== See also ==
- Media in Canada
- List of media outlets in Toronto
- List of newspapers in Canada
- List of the largest Canadian newspapers by circulation
