= NLPC =

NLPC may refer to:

- National Legal and Policy Center
- Natural Law Party of Canada
- Provincial Court of Newfoundland and Labrador
