= Doug Kelly (journalist) =

Canadian journalist and businessman

Douglas Kelly is a Canadian businessman. Kelly is the current president of St. Joseph Communications. Prior to this role, he was the Editor-in-Chief and Publisher of the Canadian National Post newspaper.
