= Faye McWatt =

The Honourable Faye E. McWatt
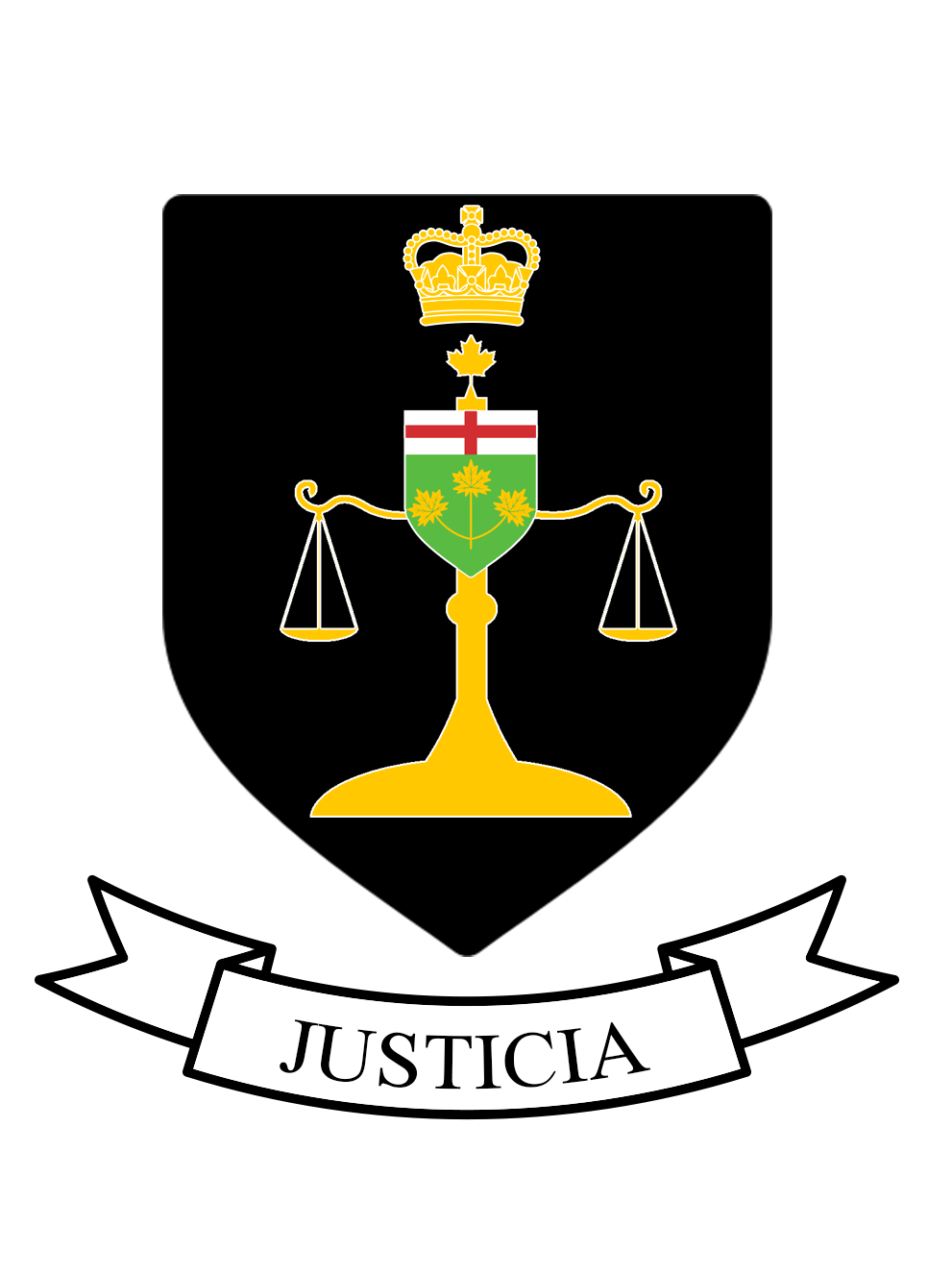
- Coat of arms of the Superior Court of Justice

Associate Chief Justice of the Superior Court of Justice of Ontario
- Incumbent
- Assumed office 21 December 2020
- Preceded by: Frank Marrocco

Personal details
- Born: Guyana
- Education: University of Ottawa (LL.B., 1984)
- Profession: Judge

The Honourable Faye E. McWatt is the Associate Chief Justice of the Superior Court of Justice of Ontario, Canada. Appointed to this position on 21 December 2020, she provides leadership and administrative oversight for the court, including the Divisional Court and the Small Claims Court. She brings a wealth of experience to the position, with 14 years practising law and over 20 years as a judge in Ontario. She is recognised for her extensive background in criminal law and her service as counsel before various commissions of inquiry.

== Early life and education ==
McWatt immigrated to Canada from Guyana in 1962. She graduated with a Bachelor of Laws (LL.B.) from the University of Ottawa in 1984 and was called to the Ontario Bar in 1986.

== Legal career ==
=== Private practice ===
Following her admission to the bar, McWatt embarked on a diverse legal career that spanned multiple areas of practice. She served as a Crown attorney practising criminal law, where she developed extensive expertise in criminal prosecution. She also worked as a criminal defence lawyer, gaining experience on both sides of the criminal justice system.

McWatt served as a federal justice department agent, where she prosecuted federal narcotics offences. This role gave her significant experience in complex federal prosecutions and drug enforcement matters.

Throughout her career in private practice, McWatt acted as counsel before numerous commissions of inquiry, including the Commission of Inquiry Into the Deployment of Canadian Forces to Somalia.

=== Initial appointment ===
McWatt was appointed to the Superior Court of Justice of Ontario in 2000. Based in Toronto, she heard matters across the full spectrum of the court's jurisdiction, including criminal, family, and civil law proceedings.

=== Associate Chief Justice ===
On 21 December 2020, Prime Minister Justin Trudeau announced McWatt's appointment as Associate Chief Justice of the Superior Court of Justice of Ontario, effective immediately. She replaced the Honourable Frank Marrocco, who retired on 10 November 2020 after 15 years of distinguished service as a judge.

As Associate Chief Justice, McWatt is responsible for the leadership and administration of the Superior Court of Justice. She works closely with Chief Justice Patrick Boucher and the Executive of the Court to ensure effective judicial administration across Ontario. Her responsibilities include oversight of the Divisional Court and the Small Claims Court, two important branches of the Superior Court system.

McWatt also serves as a member of the Canadian Judicial Council, which works to improve the quality of judicial service in the superior courts of Canada. In this capacity, she contributes to national initiatives on judicial education, ethics, and court administration.

Her appointment as Associate Chief Justice represents an important milestone in the diversity of Ontario's judicial leadership. As one of the few Black women to hold such a senior position in the Canadian judiciary, McWatt's appointment reflects the increasing recognition of the importance of diversity in judicial leadership.

== Professional contributions and recognition ==
McWatt is among a small group of Black female judges in Ontario, following pioneers such as Justice Micheline Rawlins, who was the first Black woman appointed to the Ontario Court of Justice in 1992.

Legal offices
Preceded by Frank Marrocco	Associate Chief Justice of the Superior Court of Justice of Ontario; 2020–present	Incumbent
