= Robin Camp =

Judge of the Federal Court of Canada
- In office June 26, 2015 – March 9, 2017

Judge of the Provincial Court of Alberta
- In office 2012 – June 25, 2015

Personal details
- Born: August 18, 1952 (age 74) Union of South Africa

Robin Camp (born August 18, 1952) is a former Federal Court of Canada judge. Camp was the subject of a high-profile removal hearing before the Canadian Judicial Council for his role in a 2014 sexual assault trial that he presided over. The judicial committee recommended that he be removed from the bench. In 2018 Camp was reinstated into the Law Society of Alberta.

== Early life and education ==
Camp was born and grew up in the Union of South Africa. He graduated with a bachelor's degree in commerce in 1973, and a bachelor of laws in 1975, from Stellenbosch University.

== Career ==
From 1978 to 1997, Camp was a member of the Johannesburg Bar, where he was an advocate of the Supreme Court of the Transvaal. From 1992 to 1998, he worked in Gaborone, Botswana.

In 1998, he moved to Calgary and continued to work as a lawyer. Camp worked as a civil litigator, primarily in the areas of contracts, trust, and oil and gas law.

In 2012, he was appointed as a judge to the Criminal Division of the Provincial Court of Alberta. On June 26, 2015, despite the controversy over a 2014 sexual assault trial, Conservative Justice Minister Peter MacKay appointed Camp to the Federal Court of Canada.

=== 2014 sexual assault trial ===
In 2014, Camp was presiding over a sexual assault trial. When the alleged rape victim was testifying, Camp asked her why she "couldn't just keep [her] knees together" or "sink your bottom" into the bathroom sink to avoid being raped. Camp also described her as "the accused" throughout the trial, criticized her for not screaming while the alleged assault took place, and suggested she wanted to have sex. He asked her why she didn't "skew her pelvis" to avoid penetration. He also said that "sex and pain sometimes go together, that — that's not necessarily a bad thing." Camp later acquitted the defendant Alexander Wagar.

After acquitting him, he told the defendant, "I want you to tell your friends, your male friends, that they have to be far more gentle with women. They have to be far more patient. And they have to be very careful. To protect themselves, they have to be very careful."

In October 2015, the Court of Appeal of Alberta struck down Camp's decision and ordered a retrial. The court said that Camp seemed to not understand the laws on consent and an alleged rape victim's sexual activity, and that judge may have used "sexual stereotypes and stereotypical myths, which have long since been discredited." In January 2017, Wagar was acquitted in a retrial. The presiding judge, Jerry LeGrandeur, found the complainant was inconsistent and lacked credibility.

=== Canadian Judicial Council complaint and hearings ===
In November 2015, four Alberta law professors made a complaint about Camp's conduct to the Canadian Judicial Council. Thirty different groups and people also later made complaints to the council. Critics called the comments "misogynistic" and Camp a "rape myth propagator."

On December 22, 2015, Alberta Attorney General Kathleen Ganley ordered the CJC to hold an inquiry. The hearing was only the eleventh time in the 45-year history of the CJC that an inquiry was held, and in only two of those cases did the CJC recommend removal. The Federal Court announced that Camp would not hear any cases involving sexual assault while the council investigated.

==== Committee hearing ====
The CJC assigned a committee made up of three judges and two lawyers for the initial hearing. The hearing was held in September 2016. The alleged sexual assault victim testified, saying his comments had left her feeling confused, guilty and suicidal. Camp apologized at the hearing, and said that he had undergone counseling with experts to improve his understandings of sexual assault. He admitted during the Canadian Judicial Council hearing that when he presided over the 2014 sexual assault case, his knowledge of Canadian criminal law was “very minimal” and effectively “non-existent,” acknowledging his lack of preparedness and training in criminal and sexual assault law at the time. As he addressed the Panel, Camp again referred to the alleged rape victim as "the accused" and characterised her as a "fragile personality."

During the inquiry, University of Toronto law professor Brenda Cossman, a "leading Feminist law professor" hired by Camp to educate him on rape myths characterized his remarks insensitive, but that they were part of his attempts to get clarity on the details. According to Cossman, Camp's questions stemmed from prosecution and defense positions around the nature of consent and the details of the alleged assault, "To me, he was trying to address, albeit not in a very sensitive manner, issues already put into play by the defense and the Crown." His comments regarding her knees took place during testimony establishing that the woman's pants were down by her feet, which pushed her legs nearly together. Likewise his comments on sex and pain were during a technical legal discussion on the nature of consent, and whether pain means a lack of consent.

==== Committee decision ====
On November 29, 2016, the committee recommended, by a 5–0 vote, that Camp be removed from the bench. The committee concluded that "Camp’s conduct is so manifestly and profoundly destructive of the concept of the impartiality, integrity and independence of the judicial role that public confidence is sufficiently undermined to render the judge incapable of executing the judicial office." The committee's recommendation was then considered by the CJC.

==== CJC decision and resignation ====
On March 9, 2017, the CJC recommended, by a 19–4 vote, that Parliament remove Camp from office. Camp submitted his resignation the same day.

=== Reinstatement ===
A public hearing was held November 17, 2017 and on May 22, 2018 the Law Society of Alberta reinstated Robin Camp as a lawyer in Alberta.
