= Vern Krishna =

English law professor

57th Treasurer of the Law Society of Upper Canada
- In office 2001–2003
- Preceded by: Robert Patrick Armstrong
- Succeeded by: Frank Neal Stephen Marrocco

Personal details
- Born: Burma
- Education: LLM Harvard Law School
- Occupation: Lawyer
- Website: http://www.vernkrishna.com/

Vern Krishna, CM QC FRSC, is a professor of law at the University of Ottawa and of counsel at TaxChambers LLP. He is the author of fourteen texts in tax, international tax, and business law, as well as numerous articles and case comments. His writings are frequently cited by the Supreme Court of Canada and the Tax Court of Canada.

Krishna has been active in both of his professions – law and accounting. He has been a bencher of the Law Society of Upper Canada since 1990 and served as its elected head (treasurer) from 2001 to 2003.

A Certified General Accountant, he was elected president of the Certified General Accountants of Ontario in 1995. He was a visiting scholar in international tax at Harvard Law School from 1998 to 1999 and is a commissioner of the Ontario Securities Commission.

== Education ==
Krishna received a BComm from the University of Manchester in 1963, an MBA and LLB from the University of Alberta in 1969 and 1974 respectively, an LLM from Harvard Law School in 1975, and a DCL from the University of Cambridge in 1986.

== Honours ==
- 2012 - Law Society Medal, Law Society of Upper Canada
- 2005 - Doctor of Laws, Law Society of Upper Canada
- 2004 - Order of Canada
- 2003 - Queen Elizabeth II Diamond Jubilee Medal
- 1993 - 125th Anniversary of the Confederation of Canada Medal by the Governor General of Canada
- 1992 - Fellow of the Royal Society of Canada
- 1989 - Queen's Counsel
- 1989 - Fellow of the Certified General Accountants Association of Canada
