= Frank Marrocco =

The Honourable Frank Marrocco K.C.

Associate Chief Justice of the Superior Court of Justice Ontario
- In office June 6, 2013 – November 10, 2020
- Appointed by: Stephen Harper
- Preceded by: J. Douglas Cunningham
- Succeeded by: Faye McWatt

58th Treasurer of the Law Society of Upper Canada
- In office 2003–2005
- Preceded by: Vern Krishna
- Succeeded by: George Douglas Hunter

The Honourable Frank Neal Stephen Marrocco, K.C., served as Associate Chief Justice of the Superior Court of Justice of Ontario from 2013 to 2020. He was initially appointed to the Superior Court of Justice in 2005 and served for 15 years until his retirement in November 2020.

== Early life and education ==
Marrocco received his Bachelor of Arts degree from the University of Toronto in 1967 and his Bachelor of Laws degree from the University of Toronto in 1970. He was called to the Bar of Ontario in 1972 and was appointed Queen's Counsel in 1985.

== Legal career ==
=== Private practice ===
Following his admission to the bar in 1972, Marrocco began his legal career at McFadden Marrocco & Parker, where he practised from 1972 to 1989. He then joined Smith Lyons Torrance Stevenson & Mayer, where he practised from 1989 to 2001 until that firm's merger with Gowling Lafleur Henderson LLP (now Gowling WLG), where he remained as a partner until his appointment to the bench in 2005.

Throughout his 33-year career in private practice, Marrocco developed expertise in administrative law, civil litigation, criminal law, and immigration law.

Marrocco's most notable cases included defending Lawrencia Bembenek, whose struggles to resist deportation or extradition to the United States attracted considerable media interest. He served as lead counsel for the Province of Ontario in the Walkerton Inquiry, investigating the contaminated water crisis that affected the town of Walkerton in 2000. He was also the lead prosecutor in the Bre-X securities prosecution, one of Canada's most significant securities fraud cases.

=== Law Society leadership ===
Marrocco was first elected as a Bencher of the Law Society of Upper Canada (now the Law Society of Ontario) in 1995, serving until 2005.

In 2003, Marrocco was elected Treasurer of the Law Society of Upper Canada, the highest elected position in the Law Society and the leader of Ontario's legal profession.

Marrocco also served as Chair of the Lawyers' Professional Indemnity Company (LAWPRO) from 2002 to 2003, overseeing the professional liability insurance program for Ontario lawyers.

=== Other professional activities ===
Marrocco was appointed a Judicial Fellow of the American College of Trial Lawyers.

He served as Vice Chair of the University of Toronto Academic Disciplinary Tribunal, contributing to the governance and discipline processes of his alma mater.

Marrocco authored a number of legal texts, including the Annotated Immigration Act of Canada and the Annotated Citizenship Act of Canada, both authoritative texts in Canadian immigration law.

=== Initial appointment ===
Marrocco was appointed to the Superior Court of Justice of Ontario in 2005 on the recommendation of Prime Minister Paul Martin. Based in Toronto, he heard matters across the full spectrum of the court's jurisdiction, including civil, criminal, and family law proceedings. He also sat as a member of the Divisional Court, hearing appeals and judicial review applications.

=== Associate Chief Justice ===
In June 2013, Prime Minister Stephen Harper announced Marrocco's elevation to Associate Chief Justice of the Superior Court of Justice of Ontario, replacing the Honourable Douglas Cunningham, who had resigned effective 1 October 2012.

Marrocco retired from the Superior Court of Justice on 10 November 2020, after 15 years. He was succeeded as Associate Chief Justice by Faye E. McWatt.

== Post-judicial career ==
=== Commissions and inquiries ===
In 2018, Marrocco was appointed Commissioner of the Town of Collingwood Judicial Inquiry, investigating the use of public funds arising from the sale of a municipal public utility. His report, released in 2020, contained a series of recommendations for legislative and administrative reforms.

In July 2020, the Ontario Government appointed Marrocco as Chair of the Independent Long-Term Care COVID-19 Commission. The commission was tasked with investigating how COVID-19 spread across long-term care homes in the province, examining the experiences of residents, staff, and their families, and making recommendations to prevent and better prepare for any future outbreaks. The commission also included Dr. Jack Kitts, former president and CEO of The Ottawa Hospital, and Angela Coke, a former Deputy Minister of Ontario's Ministry of Government and Consumer Services. The Long-Term Care Commission was given an accelerated timeline to complete its work, recognizing the urgent need for recommendations as the health-care system prepared for subsequent waves of the COVID-19 pandemic.

=== Return to private practice ===
Following his retirement from the bench in 2021, Marrocco returned to the private bar and joined Stockwoods LLP as Senior Counsel.

Legal offices
Preceded by Douglas Cunningham	Associate Chief Justice of the Superior Court of Justice of Ontario; 2013–2020	Succeeded by Faye E. McWatt
