= Deborah Fry =

Canadian jurist

Deborah E. Fry is a Canadian former jurist who was the Chief Justice of the Court of Appeal of Newfoundland and Labrador, starting in September 2018 until her retirement in February 2026.

== Early life and education ==
Fry was born in Shellbrook, Saskatchewan and grew up in Prince Albert. Her father was a physician. She graduated with a Bachelor of Science in Nursing from the University of Saskatchewan in 1973. Fry later returned to the University and received a Bachelor of Laws.

== Career ==
Fry worked as a paediatric and public health nurse in Saskatchewan. In 1974, she moved to Australia and taught at the Western Australian School of Nursing in Perth.

After returning to Saskatchewan and graduating from law school, Fry married and moved to Newfoundland, where she was called to the bar in 1981. While undertaking her articles, she joined the Department of Justice. She worked as Deputy Minister for both the Department of Health and the Department of Social Services. At the Department of Education, she was responsible for eliminating and reforming the denominational education system of the province. From 2001 to 2004, she was clerk of the Executive Council.

As a lawyer, Fry appeared before all levels of courts, including the Supreme Court of Canada. She practiced privately for a time and was co-founder of the Centre for Innovative Dispute Resolution.

Fry was appointed to the Supreme Court of Newfoundland and Labrador in 2007, where she a judge of the Family Division and then senior administrative judge of that division. She is on the board of directors of the National Judges Counselling Program, and previously served as president of the Program. She has also served on the board of directors of the Canadian chapter of the International Association of Women Judges.

On 22 June 2018, Prime Minister Justin Trudeau announced Fry's appointment as Chief Justice of the Court of Appeal of Newfoundland and Labrador, replacing Derek Green. She is the first woman in the role. At her swearing-in ceremony in September 2018, she spoke about the history of women in law in Newfoundland and Labrador, noting about her position, "This is a first for our province and I recognize there are special responsibilities that come with this appointment."

== Awards and honours ==
Fry received the YWCA St John's Women of Distinction Award in 2002 and the Queen's Golden Jubilee Medal. In both 2003 and 2004 she was named as one of Canada's "Top 100 Most Powerful Women" by the Women's Executive Network.

== Personal life ==
Fry is married to John Clarke, who is also a lawyer, and has two children.
