= Provincial Court of Newfoundland and Labrador =

- Established: 1729
- Jurisdiction: Newfoundland and Labrador
- Location: St. John's
- Authorised by: Provincial Court Act
- Number of positions: 23
- Website: Provincial Court

Chief Judge
- Currently: Pamela J. Goulding
- Since: September 28, 2015

The Provincial Court of Newfoundland and Labrador is the lower trial court of the Canadian province of Newfoundland and Labrador. It hears cases relating to criminal law and family law.

Judges of the Provincial Court are appointed by the provincial cabinet, on recommendation of the Attorney General.

== Judges of the Provincial Court of Newfoundland and Labrador ==
=== Current Judges ===
| Name | Location | Date Appointed | Appointed By | Prior Position(s) |
|---|---|---|---|---|
| Chief Judge Pamela Goulding | St. John's | January 30, 2012 (J); September 28, 2015(CJ) | PC | Director of Public Prosecutions |
| Associate Chief Judge Michael Madden | St. John's | February 3, 2010(J); 2015 (ACJ) | PC | Crown prosecutor |
| Judge Catherine Allen-Westby | Corner Brook | October 28, 2002 | Liberal | Monaghan, Marshall, Allen-Westby, Murphy and Watton |
| Judge Jacqueline Brazil | St. John's | February 4, 2010 | PC | Crown Lawyer |
| Judge Lynn E. Cole | Stephenville | March 13, 2014 | PC | Lawyer with Legal Aid |
| Judge Colin J. Flynn | St. John's | April 30, 2001 | Liberal | Director of Public Prosecutions; Department of Justice (Criminal) |
| Judge Robin Fowler | Grand Falls-Windsor | August 7, 2017 | Liberal | Crown Attorney (2000 to 2013); Public Prosecution Service of Canada (2013 to 2017) |
| Judge Wayne Gorman | Corner Brook | November 9, 2000 | PC | Director of Public Prosecutions; Crown counsel |
| Judge Phyllis Harris | Happy Valley-Goose Bay | June 10, 2014 | PC | Public Prosecutions Office (1999 to 2014) |
| Judge Kymil Howe | Corner Brook | March 11, 1993 | | |
| Judge Jacqueline Jenkins | Gander | September 24, 2008 | PC | Private practice |
| Judge Mark T. Linehan | Gander | March 4, 2014 | PC | Crown prosecutor |
| Judge Lori A. Marshall | St. John's | August 13, 2012 | PC | |
| Judge Paul Noble | Clarenville | September 17, 2015 | PC | Dept of Justice; RCMP |
| Judge David Orr | St. John's | August 25, 1994 | Liberal | |
| Judge D. Mark Pike | St. John's | November 17, 2008 | PC | Department of Justice; Benson Myles PLC |
| Judge Kari Ann Pike | Happy Valley-Goose Bay | August 7, 2017 | Liberal | Crown attorney |
| Judge Harold Porter | Grand Bank | October 12, 2001 | Liberal | Crown attorney (1988 to 2001) |
| Judge Bruce Short | Harbour Grace | November 1, 2003 | Liberal | Legal aid |
| Judge Lois Skanes | St.John's | February 15, 2010 | PC | Private practice |
| Judge Wynne Anne Trahey | Wabush | June 8, 2007 | PC | |
| Judge James G. Walsh | St.John's | September 3, 2012 | PC | Private practice (criminal) |

Supernumerary or Per Diem

| Name | Location | Date Appointed | Appointed By | Prior Position(s) |
|---|---|---|---|---|
| Judge Gregory O. Brown (Per Diem) | 1992; 2013 (per diem) | | Liberal | |
| Judge William English (Per Diem) | November 9, 2000; 2014 (per diem) | | Liberal | Director of NL Legal Aid |
| Judge John Joy | August 1, 2006; 2017 (per diem) | | PC | White, Ottenheimer and Baker |
| Judge Patrick J.B. Kennedy | 2001; 2014 (per diem) | | Liberal | Private Practice |

== See also ==
- Judicial appointments in Canada
- Supreme Court of Newfoundland and Labrador
- Court of Appeal of Newfoundland and Labrador
