= Caesar Colclough (judge) =

Chief Justice in Court of Appeal of Newfoundland and Labrador

Caesar Colclough (c. 1764–1822) was Chief Justice in Court of Appeal of Newfoundland and Labrador.
