= Superior Court of Justice (Ontario) =

Superior court of the province of Ontario, Canada

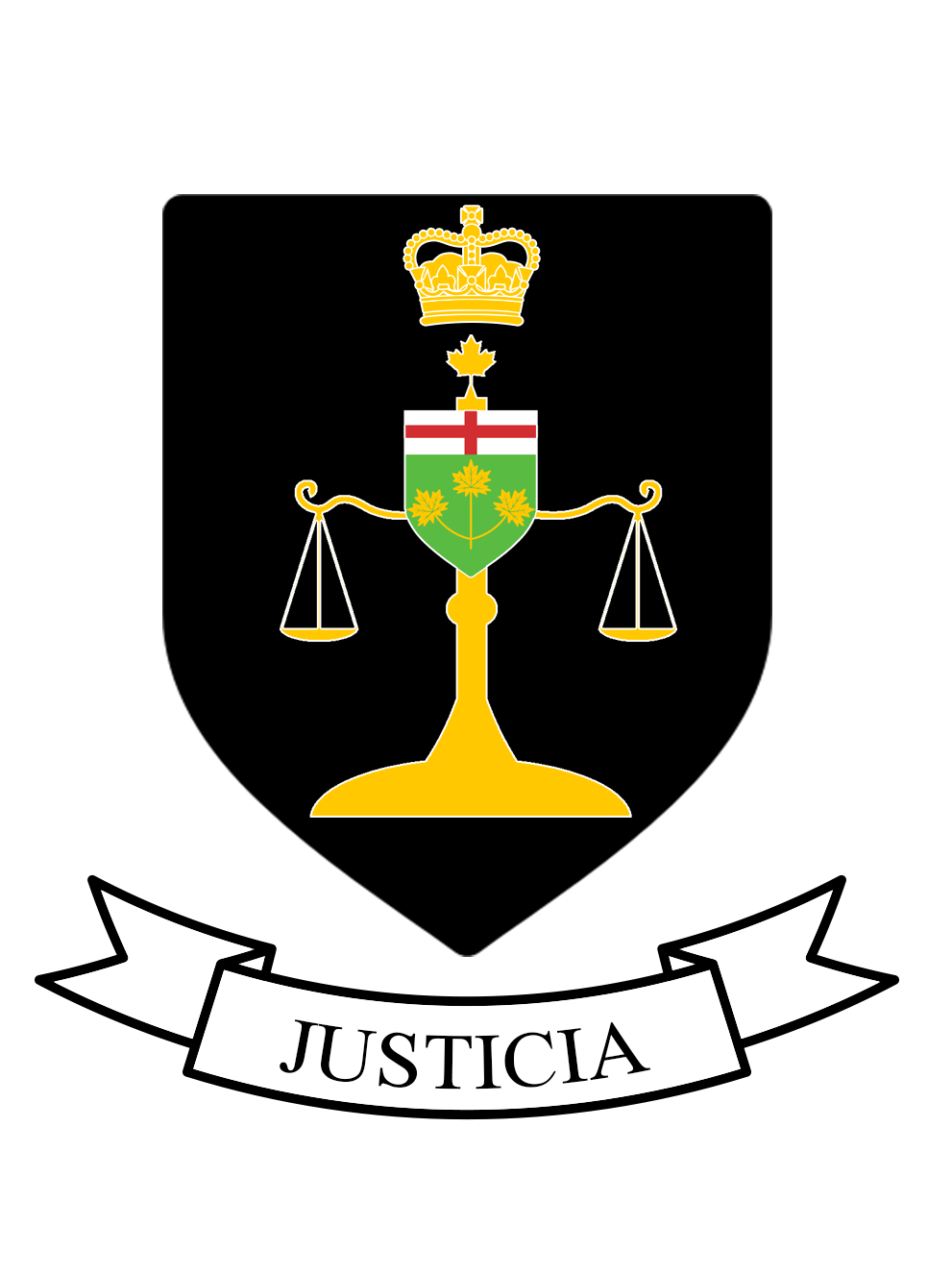
- Jurisdiction: Ontario
- Composition method: appointed by the federal government
- Authorised by: inherent jurisdiction at common law
- Appeals to: Court of Appeal for Ontario
- Number of positions: over 300
- Website: ontariocourts.ca/scj

Chief Justice
- Currently: Patrick J. Boucher
- Since: July 6, 2026

Associate Chief Justice
- Currently: Faye McWatt
- Since: 2020

The Superior Court of Justice (French: Cour supérieure de justice) is a superior court in Ontario. The Court sits in 52 locations across the province, including 17 Family Court locations, and consists of over 300 federally appointed judges.

In 1999, the Superior Court of Justice was renamed from the Ontario Court (General Division). The Superior Court is one of two divisions of the Court of Ontario. The other division is the lower court, the Ontario Court of Justice. The Superior Court has three specialized branches: Divisional Court, Small Claims Court, and Family Court.

The Superior Court has inherent jurisdiction over civil, criminal, and family law matters at common law. Although the Court has inherent jurisdiction, the authority of the Court has been entrenched in the Canadian Constitution.

== Branches ==
The Superior Court of Justice has a Commercial List, which was established 1991 to look after "complex commercial litigation" in its Civil Division, a Criminal Division, as well as three other branches:

=== Divisional Court ===
The Divisional Court hears appeals from some judgments and orders of judges of the Superior Court of Justice and reviews or hears appeals from decisions of administrative tribunals. It hears all appeals from a final order of the Superior Court where the award does not exceed $50,000.00. The Divisional Court also hears appeals from Small Claims Court judgments exceeding $2,500.00 (there is no statutory right of appeal from a Small Claims Court judgment of less than $2,500.00). The Divisional Court consists of the Chief Justice of the Superior Court of Justice, who is president of the court, and such other judges of the Superior Court as the Chief Justice designates from time to time. Hearings take place before a panel of three judges except in the case of appeals from the Small Claims Court which take place before a single judge. The Divisional Court is a descendant of the court of the same name in England, which is part of the King’s Bench division of the English High Court of Justice, and hears certain appeals.

=== Small Claims Court ===
The Small Claims Court has jurisdiction in civil matters where the amount in issue does not exceed $50,000, exclusive of interest and costs. The monetary jurisdiction of this court is fixed by regulation, rising to the current limit from $10,000 on January 1, 2010. The majority of Small Claims Court matters are heard by deputy judges, lawyers who have been appointed for a period of three years by the Regional Senior Justice to hear such cases. As result of court reform, no new full-time judges have been appointed by the provincial government to preside in Small Claims Court. Proceedings in the Small Claims Court are governed by a codified set of rules contained in O. Reg. 258/98 (as amended), the Rules of the Small Claims Court, instead of the complex Ontario Rules of Civil Procedure.

=== Family Court ===
In those areas of Ontario where the Family Court branch of the Superior Court of Justice does not exist, jurisdiction over family law disputes is divided between the Superior Court of Justice and the Ontario Court of Justice. Cases which have divorce or property claims are brought exclusively in the Superior Court, and child protection and adoption cases must be commenced solely in the Ontario Court of Justice. Each of these two courts has jurisdiction over child and spousal support, as well as custody and access claims.

In those places where the Family Court branch of the Superior Court of Justice has been established, there is no divided jurisdiction in family law matters. The Family Court succeeds what was known as the Unified Family Court, which began as a pilot project in Hamilton, in 1977. It has complete jurisdiction over all family law matters in its area, including those matters currently within the jurisdiction of judges of the Provincial Division and the General Division. The Family Court is presided over by a Senior Judge of the Superior Court for the Family Court. The Family Court consists of the Chief Justice of the Superior Court, the Associate Chief Justice (Family Court) the Senior Judge of the Family Court, and any other Superior Court Judge as assigned by the Chief Justice or designate.

== Administrative structure ==
The Superior Court consists of the Chief Justice of the Superior Court, the Associate Chief Justice of the Superior Court, eight Regional Senior Judges, the Senior Judge of the Family Court, and a total of 218 federally appointed judges. In addition, there are a number of supernumerary judges appointed as required from time to time.

The Chief Justice is responsible for the sittings of the Court and assigning judicial duties, as well as other matters relating to the governance and administration of the Court. The Associate Chief Justice, eight Regional Senior Judges, and the Senior Judge of the Family Court form the Executive of the Court, which provides advice to the Chief Justice on policy and governance. Together, the Chief Justice and the members of the Executive work to ensure the proper administration of the Court.

Ontario is divided into eight regions for judicial administration. Each region is headed by a Regional Senior judge who exercises the powers and performs the duties of the Chief justice in that region.

There are also provincially appointed judicial officers who exercise certain functions in the superior court. These include associate judges, assessment officers and registrars.

Effective September 2021, Case Management Masters are referred to as "associate judges". They are provincially appointed judicial officers with the authority to hear and determine certain matters in civil cases, including motions, pre-trials, and case conferences. Associate judges also adjudicate construction lien trials, mortgage and general references, provide dispute resolution services, and serve as registrars in bankruptcy under the Bankruptcy and Insolvency Act.

Orders made by associate judges have the same force and effect as judges' orders although they may be appealed to a judge. Associate judges are appointed and paid by the provincial government. Associate judges have existed in the courts of Ontario since 1837.

=== Regions ===
Regions
Central East Region	Central South Region	Central West Region	East Region
Barrie Bracebridge; Cobourg; Durham; Lindsay; Newmarket; Peterborough	Brantford Cayuga; Hamilton; Hamilton Family Court; Kitchener; Simcoe; St. Catharines; Welland	Brampton Guelph; Milton; Orangeville; Owen Sound; Walkerton	Belleville Brockville; Cornwall; Kingston; Kingston Family Court; L’Orignal; Ottawa; Napanee; Pembroke; Perth; Picton
Northeast Region	Northwest Region	Southwest Region	Toronto Region
Cochrane Gore Bay; Haileybury; North Bay; Parry Sound; Sault Ste. Marie; Sudbury; Timmins	Fort Frances Kenora; Thunder Bay	Chatham Goderich; London; Sarnia; St. Thomas; Stratford; Windsor; Woodstock	

== Notable past judges ==
- Todd L. Archibald 1999–2021
- Archie Campbell 1996–2007
- Patrick LeSage 1999–2002 as Chief Justice
- Sarah E. Pepall (1999–2012), appointed to Ontario Court of Appeal
- David H. Doherty (1988–1990)
- Michael Moldaver (1990–1995), appointed to the Court of Appeal; appointed to the Supreme Court of Canada (2011)
- Andromache Karakatsanis (2002–2010), appointed to the Court of Appeal; appointed to the Supreme Court of Canada (2011)
- Edward W. Ducharme (2002–2012), appointed to Ontario Court of Appeal
- Alexandra Hoy (2002–2011), appointed to Ontario Court of Appeal
- Mary Lou Benotto (2001–2013), appointed to Ontario Court of Appeal
- Frank Marrocco (2005–2020; Associate Chief Justice 2013–2020)
- Geoffrey B. Morawetz (2005–2026; Regional Senior Justice for the Toronto Region 2013–2019; Chief Justice 2019–2026)
- Michelle O'Bonsawin (2017–2022), appointed to Supreme Court of Canada

== See also ==
- Courts of Ontario
