= Derek Green (judge) =

Derek Green (born April 28, 1947 in St. John's) is a Canadian jurist and the former Chief Justice of the Newfoundland and Labrador. He became a supernumerary justice on December 1, 2017.

Green was a rumoured candidate to replace Supreme Court of Canada Justice Michel Bastarache.
