= Sarah Pepall =

Canadian jurist

Sarah Pepall is a justice of the Court of Appeal for Ontario. She is a graduate of McGill University Faculty of Law. She has also previously served on the Ontario Superior Court of Justice.
