= Court of Appeal of Newfoundland and Labrador =

- The Royal Arms as used by the Court of Appeal
- Established: 1791
- Location: St. John's
- Authorised by: Judicature Amendment Act, 1974
- Number of positions: 6
- Website: court.nl.ca/appeal

Chief Justice
- Currently: Daniel Boone
- Since: June 15, 2026

The Court of Appeal of Newfoundland and Labrador is at the top of the hierarchy of courts for the Canadian province of Newfoundland and Labrador. The Court of Appeal derives its powers and jurisdiction from the Court of Appeal Act.

The independent Court of Appeal was established in 2018 and comprises the Chief Justice and five other justices. At any given time there may be one or more additional justices who sit as supernumerary justices. From 1975 until 2018 the Court of Appeal was constituted as the appeal division of the Supreme Court of Newfoundland and Labrador with judges appointed specifically to hear appeals from the General Division of the Supreme Court. Prior to 1975 both trial and appeals were carried out in the Supreme Court, where the individual judges routinely acted as a trial judges but, in the event of an appeal, would sit together (en banc) to hear it.

The Court now hears appeals of all type from the Supreme Court of Newfoundland and Labrador's General Division and Family Division, the Provincial Court, and a number of boards and tribunals. Decisions are subject to final appeal to the Supreme Court of Canada. Prior to 1949, when Newfoundland became a province of Canada, final appeals passed to the Judicial Committee of the Privy Council, which was the highest court for the British Empire and Commonwealth. (For a list of Newfoundland decisions from the Judicial Committee, see: List of Newfoundland Cases of the Judicial Committee of the Privy Council (pre-1949)).

== Current members ==
| Position / Name | Appointed | Nominated by | Position prior to appointment |
|---|---|---|---|
| Chief Justice Daniel Boone | 2022 | Trudeau | Supreme Court of Newfoundland and Labrador (Trial Division) |
| Justice Francis P. O’Brien | 2017 | Trudeau | Director of Legal Education, Law Society of Newfoundland and Labrador |
| Justice Frances Knickle | 2021 | Trudeau | Supreme Court of Newfoundland and Labrador (Trial Division) |
| Justice Katherine O'Brien | 2022 | Trudeau | Supreme Court of Newfoundland and Labrador (Trial Division) |
| Justice Glen Noel | 2024 | Trudeau | Supreme Court of Newfoundland and Labrador (Trial Division) |

Supernumerary

| Position / Name | Appointed | Nominated by | Position prior to appointment |
|---|---|---|---|
| Justice William H. Goodridge | 2018 | Trudeau | Supreme Court of Newfoundland and Labrador (Trial Division) |

== List of chief justices ==
Source (1791–1880):

Court of Civil Jurisdiction founded 1791
Supreme Court of Judicature of the Island of Newfoundland founded 1792
Supreme Court of Newfoundland founded 1824
Supreme Court of Newfoundland and Labrador Court of Appeal founded 1975.

| No | Name | Appointed | Position prior to appointment | Notes |
|---|---|---|---|---|
| 26 | Daniel Boone | 15 June 2026 | Court of Appeal | |
| 25 | Deborah Fry | 22 June 2018 | Supreme Court of Newfoundland and Labrador (Trial Division) | |
| 24 | J. Derek Green | 27 Mar 2009 | | Became a Supernumerary Justice on 1 December 2017 |
| 23 | Clyde Wells | 1999 | Court of Appeal | to 2009 |
| 22 | James R. Gushue | 1996 | | to 1998 |
| 21 | Noel Goodridge | 17 Nov 1986 | | |
| 20 | Arthur Samuel Mifflin | 1979 | Chief Justice Trials Division | |
| 19 | Robert Stafford Furlong | 1958 | | |
| 18 | Sir Albert Joseph Walsh | Sep 1949 | 1st Lieutenant-Governor | |
| 17 | Sir Lewis Edward Emerson | 1944 | Commissioner for Defence | |
| 16 | Sir William Henry Horwood | 25 July 1902 | Minister of Justice and Attorney-General | |
| 15 | Sir Joseph Ignatius Little | 1898 | Judge | |
| 14 | Sir Frederick Bowker Terrington Carter | 20 May 1880 | Prime Minister of Newfoundland | |
| 13 | Sir Hugh William Hoyles | 4 March 1865 | Prime Minister and Attorney General | |
| 12 | Sir Francis Brady | 29 Nov 1847 | | |
| 11 | Thomas Norton | 5 Nov 1844 | | |
| 10 | John Gervase Hutchinson Bourne | 1838 | | Removed from office, 1844 |
| 9 | Henry John Boulton | 1833 | Attorney General of Upper Canada | Removed from office, 1844 |
| 8 | Richard Alexander Tucker | 1 Oct 1822 | | |
| 7 | Sir Francis Forbes | 4 Aug 1816 | Crown Law Officer in Bermuda | left to be the first Chief Justice of the Supreme Court of New South Wales. |
| 6 | Caesar Colclough | 1813 | Chief Justice of Prince Edward Island | |
| 5 | Thomas Tremlett | 1804 | Naval Officer | Exchanged for Colclough, 1813 |
| 4 | Jonathan Ogden | 1803 | Naval Officer | |
| 3 | Richard Routh | 1797 | Collector of Customs | Drowned at sea |
| 2 | D'Ewes Coke | 1793 | Naval surgeon | |
| 1 | John Reeves | 1791 | Law Clerk to the Board of Trade (held concurrently) | Sole judge; author of the Judicature Acts of 1791 and 1792 |

== See also ==
- Judicial appointments in Canada
- Provincial Court of Newfoundland and Labrador
- Supreme Court of Newfoundland and Labrador
