= Judicial appointments in Canada =

Judicial appointments in Canada are made by the federal government or provincial government. Superior and federal court judges are appointed by federal government, while inferior courts are appointed by the provincial government.

== Court system ==
There are three levels of courts in each province or territory (except Nunavut): Provincial Court of Appeal, Provincial Superior Court (upper level) courts appointed by the federal government, and a provincial or territorial court appointed by the province or territory.

== Provincial courts ==
=== Advisory committee ===
Candidates for these courts are screened by a judicial advisory committee established for each province or territory. Several provinces have created arm's length committees that make a short list of recommendations. Committees are often composed of representatives of the federal and provincial governments, the legal profession, the judiciary, and the general public.

==== Ontario Judicial Appointments Advisory Committee ====
In Ontario, the Judicial Appointments Advisory Committee (JAAC) is made up of 13 members: 7 lay members, 2 judges, 1 member appointed by the Ontario Judicial Council, and 3 from the legal community. JAAC recommends a list of 3 or 4 candidates, far less than its federal counterpart. Proponents of the system argue that this procedure has limited the scope of patronage in appointments to Ontario courts, and has diversified the makeup of judges in the province. Unlike other committees, the JAAC advertises openings and interviews candidates in person.

=== Application ===
Lawyers who meet the legal and constitutional requirements can apply, as well as existing provincial or territorial court judges. These candidates must complete a comprehensive Personal History Form, which is submitted to the appropriate advisory committee. In its assessment of each candidate, the committee reviews the PHF and consults references and other persons both in and outside the legal realm. Some committees interview the candidate.

== Provincial Superior and federal courts ==
=== Judicial Appointment Committees ===
A committee of eight persons vets candidates in each region across Canada. Each candidate is assessed as being "recommended" or "not recommended." A third designation, "highly recommended" was eliminated in 2007, which critics say enhanced the government's ability to make patronage appointments. The federal government said the system emphasizes merit, and the large pool allows the government "to address the particular needs of the court in question." As of 2007, each committee has four members. In 2016, the federal government introduced a revised appointments process that restored the “highly recommended” category.

Members
British Columbia	Alberta	Saskatchewan	Manitoba	Ontario (East & North)	Ontario (West & South)
Justice Brenda J. Brown (Supreme Court of British Columbia ) Jan Lindsay, QC (Lindsay LLP); Rajwant (Raji) Mangat (West Coast LEAF); Charlotte A. Salomon, QC (McConnan Bion O'Connor & Peterson); Dean A. Crawford, QC (Pulver Crawford Munroe)	Justice Peter W.L. Martin, Wendy E. Best, QC (Dunphy Best Blocksom); Hanan Kamal Campbell (EPCOR Utilities Inc); Michelle Christopher, QC, Jennifer N. Davis (Private practitioner); Danika Billie Littlechild (UNESCO); Jelle Jeen Van Ens (social worker)	Justice Brian A. Barrington-Foote, Heather Laing, Q.C. (McDougall Gauley); Diana K. Lee, Q.C., Lisa Watson (Peszko & Watson); Kimberly Beaudin; Curtis Kleisinger (Mother Thresa Middle School); Brenda Merasty	Justice Diana M. Cameron, Irene A. Hamilton (Manitoba Justice); Priscilla Sternat-Mcivor, Timothy Kurbis, Lorraine Brandson, Aimée Craft, Hymie Weinstein	Justice Bonnie R. Warkentin, Marisa Victor, Celina Reitberger, Mary Kloosterman, Antje McNeely, Pierre Riopel	Justice Lynne C. Leitch, Beverley K. Jacobs, Allen J. Wynperle, Kuljit K. Bhamra, Lynn Macaulay, Jessica Sartori, Betty-Lou Souter (CEO Community Care)
Ontario (Toronto Area)	Quebec (West)	Quebec (East)	New Brunswick	Prince Edward Island	Nova Scotia
Justice Sarah E. Pepall (Court of Appeal for Ontario); Emily C. Cole, Arleen Huggins (Koski Minsky); Rosella Cornaviera, Keith Forde, Helen (Au) Hayward, Bruce Rivers	Justice Nicholas P. Kasirer (Supreme Court of Canada); Louise Mailhot, Ad. E. (Faskens); Karine Joizil; Lucie Lalonde, Louis Charette, Jean Perras	Catherine La Rosa, Pierre Giroux (Tremblay Bois Mignault Lemay); Miville Tremblay, France Bilodeau, Stuart (Kip) Cobbett (UNLTD VR); Lise Verreault	Justice Margaret E.L. Larlee, Pierre Castonguay (NB Legal aid); Catherine Lahey, Q.C.(Stewart McKelvey); Blair C. Fraser, Clarence LeBreton, Bridget Ryan, Normand G. Thériault	Justice Wayne D. Cheverie (Supreme Court of PEI); Nancy E. Birt, QC (Birt McNeil); Krista J. MacKay, QC, Erin T. Mitchell (Dept. Minister of Justice); Nadine A. DeWolfe, Mary MacInnis; Ann Sherman (Independent writer)	Justice Patrick J. Duncan, Kathryn M. Dumke, QC (Dumke Law); Jack Townsend (Cox & Palmer); Alonzo Charles Wright (NS Public Prosecution); Dr. Garland (Gary) Brooks (St FX Psychology); Naiomi W. Metallic (Dalhousie Law); Philip J. Star (Pink Star Barro)
Newfoundland and Labrador	Nunavut	Northwest Territories	Yukon	Tax Court of Canada	
Justice Charles W. White; Gladys Dunne, Twila E. Reid (Stewart McKelvey); Derek P. Ford (Jewer & Ford); Remzi Cej, Cathy Follett, Madelyn Kelly	Justice Bonnie M. Tulloch, Joseph Paul Murdoch-Flowers (legal aid); John M. Hickes, Eliyah Padluq	Vacant	Justice Ronald S. Veale, David Christie, Geneviève Chabot, Norah Mooney, George Filipovic, Jessica Lott Thompson, Anne Maje Raider	Justice Randall S. Bocock (Tax Court of Canada); Michel Bourque (KPMG); Kimberley Brooks (Dalhousie Law); Nathalie Goyette, Virender Krishna	

=== Minister of Justice ===
A list of all candidates reviewed by the committee, together with the above categorization and reasons, or "comments" in the case of judge candidates, is forwarded by the committee to the federal Minister of Justice.

The Minister draws an appointment from the list of names received from the committees, and recommends that individual to the federal cabinet. Where the appointment is that of a Chief Justice or a Puisne Justice, the recommendation to cabinet is made by the Prime Minister of Canada.

"Elevation," or the appointment of a superior court judge already in office to another superior court (usually an appellate court), is not subject to the above application and assessment procedures. These appointments are effected through a recommendation to cabinet by the Minister of Justice (or Prime Minister) following consultations undertaken by the Minister.

In November 2005, a subcommittee of the Canadian parliament expressed the need for change and for more transparency in this appointment process. The subcommittee proposed that the Minister consult the Chief Justice of the court involved on the needs of the court prior to an appointment, that specific court vacancies and their requirements be advertised and that, subject to further study, advisory committees develop a short list of interviewed candidates for each vacancy.

=== Federal courts ===
Appointments to the Federal Court and to the Federal Court of Appeal are subject to the application and assessment procedure.

Appointments to the Tax Court are subject to candidate assessments by a single five member advisory committee for all Canada which includes a representative of the Tax Court—as a one-year pilot project announced in November 2006.

== Supreme Court of Canada ==
Eligibility for the Supreme Court of Canada is set out in the Supreme Court Act. Judges of the court are made up of eight puisne judges and the Chief Justice. Candidates must have either been a judge of a superior court or a lawyer for at least ten years in their province's bar. Appointments are made by the Governor General of Canada on advice of the Prime Minister.

Appointments to the Supreme Court of Canada are subject to the legal requirement that three judges must be appointed from Quebec. By convention, the other 6 are appointed from Ontario (3), Western Canada (2), and Atlantic Canada (1). These appointments are not subject to the procedures described above for the appointment of superior court judges, and are made on the basis of a recommendation to cabinet by the Prime Minister. Recently, this has been augmented through the establishment of an ad hoc advisory committee for each vacancy on the Court; this committee reviews a list of 7 nominees submitted by the federal Minister of Justice, and shortlists three candidates from which the Prime Minister chooses a name for appointment. In addition, in February 2006 a parliamentary committee was allowed to interview the Prime Minister's selected candidate prior to his appointment.

=== Criticism of process ===
The appointment process has been the source of some controversy in recent years, as appointments occur with no input from parliament or opposition political parties. Critics have alleged that this process has allowed the Prime Minister to effectively "stack" the courts with ideologically like-minded individuals who will support the current government's stance. Conservative critics have argued this leads to the rise of partisan, activist judges instead of neutral ones. Conversely, supporters have justified the process of appointment on the grounds that quiet appointments made as a result of the Prime Minister's consultation with experts result in better choices than ones that would be made in a public process where opposition politicians were allowed to interrogate the nominees and politicize the process.

=== Recent developments ===
==== Under Martin ====
In response to the critics, Prime Minister Paul Martin made a few changes the appointment process in 2004. He indicated his intention to appoint a special parliamentary committee to screen the new nominees and report to parliament on their findings, though neither this committee nor the parliament has the power to block recommendations. Similarly, the committee would not have the ability to directly interview the nominee. The Minister of Justice appeared before the House of Commons Standing Committee on Justice and Human Rights to explain, for the first time in public, the process for selecting the justices.

However, when the names of Justices Abella and Charron were put forward, parliament was dissolved, and thus unable to form committees. The government announced that the nominees would be reviewed by a special parliamentary committee, which would issue a report to Parliament. An ad hoc parliamentary committee was created to review Abella and Charron's appointments.

In addition to the parliamentarians, the committee also had two members of the Canadian Judicial Council, sitting judges who participated in the closed door discussions on the process, and recused themselves for the consideration of the specific appointees. Committee members from the Conservative Party of Canada refused to sign their committee's final report, calling the entire process "insufficient."

In April 2005, the Liberal government announced another change to the selection process: the advisory committee (which includes many federal nominees) would see a list of seven names given to them by the Minister of Justice and would be required to cut the list to three. The Prime Minister would choose one name from the list of the three remaining candidates to put forward to the Governor General. The advisory committee includes a Member of Parliament from each recognized party, a retired judge and, from the region where the vacancy arises, a nominee of the provincial Attorneys General, a nominee of the law societies and two prominent Canadians who are neither lawyers nor judges. A new advisory committee will be formed each time a Supreme Court vacancy occurs.

==== Under Harper ====
In February 2006, Prime Minister Stephen Harper's used an "Ad Hoc Committee to Review a Nominee for the Supreme Court of Canada" to interview Marshall Rothstein prior to his appointment. The committee had no power to veto the nomination, which was simply to allow for questions from parliamentarians. The Prime Minister maintained the final say on whom to recommend for appointment.

In 2011, Harper again appointed two Supreme Court justices, Andromache Karakatsanis and Michael Moldaver, from a shortlist of 6 candidates unanimously approved by a multi-party committee of Conservative, Liberal, and New Democratic Party Members of Parliament. They each later appeared before ad hoc parliamentary committees, although the committee had no authority to approve or deny the appointments.

In 2013, Harper appointed Marc Nadon as a member from Quebec. Due to controversy about the appointment, the federal government referred the constitutionality of the appointment to the Supreme Court of Canada. In their decision in Reference Re Supreme Court Act, ss 5 and 6, the Supreme Court quashed his appointment, concluding he did not meet the eligibility criteria provided in the Supreme Court Act. At the time, Chief Justice Beverley McLachlin called Harper to consult with him on the advisability of Nadon's appointment. Harper refused to take the call and criticized McLachlin for making the call. Harper's comments were criticized by the legal community and a complaint was forwarded to the International Commission of Jurists in Switzerland. The ICJ concluded that McLachlin deserved an apology from Harper, but none had been given as of July 2014.

== Tenure of judges and removal from the bench ==
Judges in positions that are under federal control (federally appointed positions) are eligible to serve on the bench until age 75. In some but not all Provincial and Territorial positions, appointed judges have tenure until age 70 instead.

As for removal from the bench, judges have only rarely been removed from the bench in Canada. For federally appointed judges, it is the task of the Canadian Judicial Council to investigate complaints and allegations of misconduct on the part of federally appointed judges. The Council may recommend to the (federal) Minister of Justice that the judge be removed. To do so, the Minister must in turn get the approval of both the House of Commons and the Senate before a judge can be removed from office. (The rules for provincial/territorial judges are similar, but they can be removed by a provincial or territorial cabinet.)

== See also ==
- At His Majesty's pleasure
- Judicial Appointments Board for Scotland
- Judicial Appointments Commission
