= Supreme Court of Newfoundland and Labrador =

Highest court of Newfoundland and Labrador

- The Royal Arms as used by the Supreme Court
- Interactive map of Supreme Court of Newfoundland and Labrador
- Established: 1730
- Jurisdiction: Newfoundland and Labrador
- Composition method: appointed by the federal government
- Authorised by: All criminal and civil proceedings
- Appeals to: Court of Appeal of Newfoundland and Labrador
- Judge term length: mandatory retirement by age of 75
- Number of positions: 27
- Website: court.nl.ca/supreme

Chief Justice of the Supreme Court
- Currently: Hon. Daniel Boone
- Since: 15 June 2026

The Supreme Court of Newfoundland and Labrador is the superior court for the Canadian province of Newfoundland and Labrador. The Supreme Court has jurisdiction to hear appeals in both criminal and civil matters from the Provincial Court and designated boards and administrative tribunals. The court also hear serious criminal cases in the first instances, matters of probate, and family law matters.

The Supreme Court consists of 29 judicial seats including the position of Chief Justice. Of the current justices, 4 sit with supernumerary status.

== About the Court ==
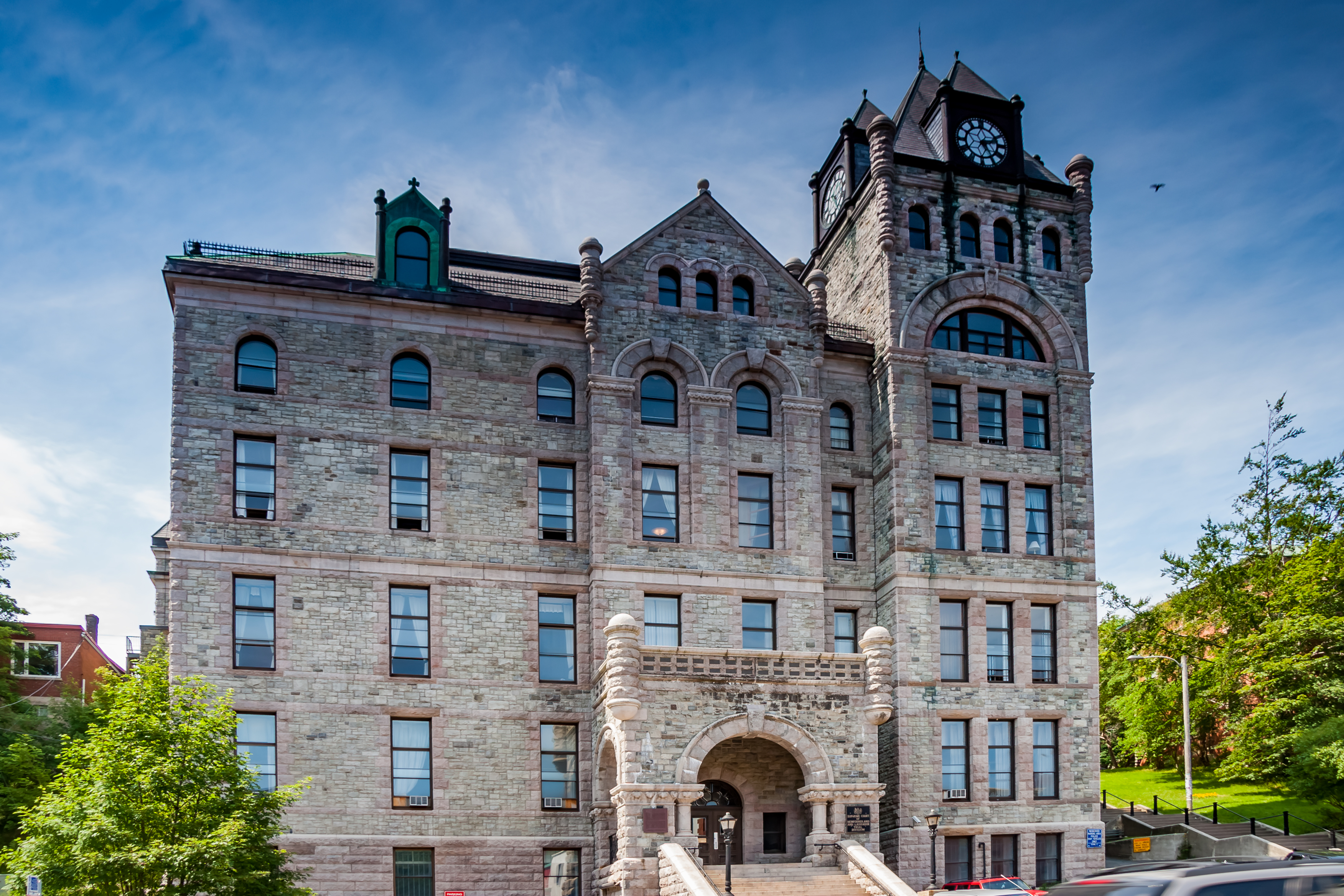
South facade of the St. John's Court House.

The Court is composed of the General Division and Family Division, and has the authority to hear a wide range of cases including civil and criminal matters, matters of estates and guardianship, and family matters. The Court has the authority to hear appeals of specific matters not under jurisdiction of the province's appellate court. The creation of a Supreme Court took place in 1730, before the Colony was granted a legislative assembly.

The Court is located in six regions of the province: Corner Brook (3 justices), Gander (1 justice), Grand Bank (1 justice), Grand Falls-Windsor (1 justice), Happy Valley-Goose Bay (1 justice), and St. John's (18 justices).

== Current justices ==
Name	Appointed	Division	Location	Nominated by	Prior position(s)
Chief Justice Raymond P. Whalen	June 19, 2008 (Trial); December 11, 2014 (CJ)	Trial	St. John's	Harper	
Justice Valerie L. Marshall	April 29, 2009	Trial	St. John's	Harper	Solo Practitioner
Justice Rosalie McGrath	May 31, 2012	Family	St. John's	Harper	
Justice Laura A. Mennie	March 9, 2014	Family	Corner Brook	Harper	Provincial court (2012 to 2014); Newfoundland Department of (2007 to 2012); Legal Aid (1994 to 2007); Poole, Althouse (1993 to 1994)
Justice George L. Murphy	April 10, 2014	Family	Corner Brook	Harper	Poole Althouse (1992 to 2014)
Justice Jane M. Fitzpatrick	March 27, 2015	Family	St. John's	Harper	
Justice Cillian D. Sheahan	June 20, 2015	Family	St. John's	Harper	
Justice Sandra R. Chaytor	May 12, 2017	Trial	St. John's	Trudeau	Cox & Palmer
Justice Vikas Khaladkar	October 20, 2017	Trial	St. John's	Trudeau	
Justice Alexander S. MacDonald	November 9, 2017	Trial	St. John's	Trudeau	
Justice Michelle Coady	March 26, 2019	Family	St. John's	Trudeau	
Justice Peter Browne	March 24, 2021	Trial	St. John's	Trudeau	
Justice Irene Muzychka	March 24, 2021	Trial	St. John's	Trudeau	
Justice Trudy Button	March 24, 2021	Trial	St. John's	Trudeau	
Justice Stacy Ryan	March 24, 2021	Trial	Happy Valley-Goose Bay	Trudeau	
Justice Peter O'Flaherty	May 21, 2021	Trial	St. John's	Trudeau	
Justice Philip Osborne	May 21, 2021	Trial	St. John's	Trudeau	
Justice Melanie Del Rizzo	October 11, 2022	Trial	Grand Falls-Windsor	Trudeau	
Justice Thomas Johnson	October 11, 2022	Trial	Corner Brook	Trudeau	
Justice Leanne O'Leary	August 28, 2023	Trial	Gander	Trudeau	
Justice David Conway	October 10, 2023	Trial	Grand Bank	Trudeau	
Justice Stephanie Hickman	October 10, 2023	Family	St. John's	Trudeau	
Justice Trina Simms	July 19, 2024	Trial	St. John's	Trudeau	
Justice Dean Porter	November 27, 2024	Trial	St. John's	Trudeau	
Justice Justin Mellor	December 17, 2024	Trial	St. John's	Trudeau	

=== Supernumerary ===
Name	Date appointed	Division	Nominated by	Prior Position(s)
Justice Kendra J. Goulding	June 5, 2002	Trial	Chretien	
Justice Alphonsus E. Faour	November 5, 2003	Trial		
Justice Garrett A. Handrigan	March 27, 2001	Trial		
Justice Robert P. Stack	November 30, 2009	Trial	Harper	Cox & Palmer (1984 to 2009)

== See also ==
- Judicial appointments in Canada
- Provincial Court of Newfoundland and Labrador
- Court of Appeal of Newfoundland and Labrador
