= 1978 Birthday Honours =

British government recognitions

The Queen's Birthday Honours 1978 were appointments by many of the Commonwealth realms of Queen Elizabeth II to various orders and honours to reward and highlight good works by citizens of those countries. The appointments were made to celebrate the official birthday of The Queen. The announcement date varies, both from year to year and from country to country.

The 1978 Queen's Birthday Honours were announced on 3 June for the United Kingdom and Life Peers, Australia, New Zealand, Mauritius, Fiji, The Bahamas, Grenada, and Papua New Guinea.

The recipients of honours are displayed here as they were styled before their new honour, and arranged by honour, with classes (Knight, Knight Grand Cross, etc.) and then divisions (Military, Civil, etc.) as appropriate.

== United Kingdom ==
=== Life Peer ===
Baroness

- Dame Evelyn Joyce Denington, DBE, Chairman, Stevenage Development Corporation. Lately Chairman, Greater London Council.
- Margaret Susan Ryder, CMG, OBE, (Mrs. Cheshire), Founder and Social Worker, Sue Ryder Foundation for the Sick and Disabled of all Age Groups.

Baron

- William John Blease, lately Northern Ireland Officer of the Irish Congress of Trade Unions.
- Sir Robert Brockie Hunter, MBE, Vice-Chancellor and Principal, University of Birmingham.
- Sir Paul Reilly, lately Director, Design Council.
- Sir Edwin Rodney Smith, KBE, lately President of the Royal College of Surgeons of England.

=== Privy Councillor ===
- Gerald Bernard Kaufman, MP, Minister of State, Department of Industry.
- The Honourable Sir Robert Edgar Megarry, Vice-Chancellor of the Chancery Division of the High Court of Justice.
- Roland Dunstan Moyle, MP, Minister of State, Department of Health and Social Security.
- John Smith, MP, Minister of State, Privy Council Office.

=== Knight Bachelor ===
- Professor Kenneth John Wilson Alexander, Chairman, Highlands and Islands Development Board.
- The Honourable John Jacob Astor, MBE, Chairman, Agricultural Research Council.
- Professor George Grenfell-Baines, OBE. For services to Architecture.
- Terence Norman Beckett, CBE, Chairman and Managing Director, Ford Motor Co. Ltd.
- William James Bryden, CBE, QC, lately Sheriff Principal of the Lothian and Borders.
- Eric Wallers Cheadle, CBE. For services to the newspaper industry.
- Amos Henry Chilver, Vice-Chancellor, Cranfield Institute of Technology.
- John Stafford Cripps, CBE, lately Chairman, Countryside Commission.
- John Graham Cuckney, Chairman of the Crown Agents.
- Richard Kenneth Denby, President of The Law Society.
- Alastair Frederick Down, OBE, MC, TD, Chairman, Burmah Oil Co. Ltd.
- Denis Follows, CBE. For services to Sport.
- Francis Geoffrey Hawkings, Chairman, Stone Platt Industries Ltd. For services to Export.
- Barrie Heath, DFC, AE, Group Chairman, Guest Keen & Nettlefolds Ltd. For services to Export.
- Harry Thurston Hookway, Chief Executive and Deputy Chairman, British Library Board.
- Hans Leo Kornberg, Sir William Dunn Professor of Biochemistry, University of Cambridge.
- Frederick Alfred Laker, Chairman and Managing Director, Laker Airways Ltd.
- William d'Auvergne Maycock, CBE, MVO, Director, Blood Products Laboratory, Lister Institute.
- Henry Roderick Moore, CBE, Chairman, North East Thames Regional Health Authority.
- Peter Parker, MVO, Chairman, British Railways Board.
- Ernest Jones-Parry, Executive Director, International Sugar Organization.
- Thomas Parry. For services to Welsh scholarship.
- Raymond William Pennock, Deputy Chairman, Imperial Chemical Industries Ltd. For services to Export.
- John Devereux Pile, TD, Chairman, Imperial Group Ltd.
- Professor Harry Raymond Pitt, Vice-Chancellor, University of Reading.
- Douglas Ranger, Dean, The Middlesex Hospital Medical School.
- Robert Telford, CBE, Managing Director, GEC-Marconi Electronics Ltd. For services to Export.

Diplomatic Service and Overseas List

- Anthony William Byrd Hayward. For services to British commercial interests and the British community in India.
- Yue-Kong Pao, CBE. For public and community services in Hong Kong.

Australian States

State of Victoria

- Roderick Howard Carnegie, of Toorak. For services to industry.
- Louis Frederick Pyke, ED, of Malvern. For services to the Multiple Sclerosis Society.

State of Queensland

- Roderick Consett Proctor, MBE, of Hamilton. For services to the business community and people of Queensland.
- Frank Victor Sharpe, CMG, OBE, ED, of Clayfield. For services to the community.

State of Western Australia

- George Montario Bedbrook, OBE, of Floreat Park. For services in the fields of orthopaedic surgery and paraplegic and quadraplegic rehabilitation.

=== Order of the Bath ===
==== Knight Grand Cross of the Order of the Bath (GCB) ====
Military Division

- Admiral Sir Henry Leach, KCB.

==== Knight Commander of the Order of the Bath (KCB) ====
Military Division

Royal Navy

- Vice Admiral Arthur Desmond Cassidi.
- Vice Admiral John Morrison Forbes.

Army

- Major General Peter John Hall Leng, CB, MBE, MC, (307865) late The Royal Anglian Regiment, Colonel Commandant Corps of Royal Military Police. Colonel Commandant Royal Army Veterinary Corps.
- Lieutenant General John Wilfred Stanier, MBE, (365443) late The Royal Scots Greys (2nd Dragoons).

Royal Air Force

- Air Marshal John Moreton Nicholls, CBE, DFC, AFC.
- Acting Air Marshal John Gingell, CBE.

Civil Division

- Lawrence Airey, CB, Second Permanent Secretary, HM Treasury.
- Robert Temple Armstrong, CB, CVO, Permanent Under-Secretary of State, Home Office.
- John Alexander Atkinson, CB, DFC, Second Permanent Secretary, Department of Health and Social Security.
- Henry Peter Rowe, CB, QC, First Parliamentary Counsel.

==== Companion of the Order of the Bath (CB) ====
Military Division

Royal Navy

- Rear Admiral Christopher Martin Bevan.
- Rear Admiral William James McClune.
- Rear Admiral Cecil Ernest Price, AFC.
- Rear Admiral Charles Arthur Winfield Weston.

Army

- Major General Albert Patrick Dignan, MBE, (410605), late Royal Army Medical Corps (now RARO).
- Major General John Hulbert Foster (343958), late Corps of Royal Engineers.
- Major General Donald Edward Isles, OBE, (304096), Colonel Commandant The King's Division. Colonel The Duke of Wellington's Regiment (West Riding). Honorary Colonel 3rd Battalion Yorkshire Volunteers Territorial and Army Volunteer Reserve.
- The Venerable Archdeacon Peter Mallett, QHC, (432359), Royal Army Chaplains' Department.

Royal Air Force

- Air Vice-Marshal William Edward Colahan, CBE, DFC, (Retd.)
- Air Vice-Marshal David Brownrigg Craig, OBE.
- Air Vice-Marshal Thomas Lawrie Kennedy, AFC.
- Air Vice-Marshal Charles Ernest Ness, CBE.

Civil Division

- William Ewart Bell, Permanent Secretary, Department of Finance for Northern Ireland.
- William Rupert Graham Bell, Under-Secretary, Department of Industry.
- James Armstrong Gordon Carmichael, Chief Medical Adviser, Department of Health and Social Security.
- John Seton Cassels, Director, Manpower Services Commission.
- John Rankin Christie, lately Deputy Master and Comptroller, Royal Mint.
- Peter Tiarks Ede England, Deputy Secretary, Ministry of Defence.
- James Allan Ford, MC, Under-Secretary, Scottish Office.
- Graham John Graham-Green, TD, Chief Master of the Supreme Court Taxing Office.
- Peter John Hudson, Deputy Secretary, Ministry of Defence.
- Fred Jones, CBE, Deputy Secretary, HM Treasury.
- William Ian McIndoe, Deputy Secretary, Cabinet Office.
- Ronald Sydney Matthews, Deputy Secretary, Department of Health and Social Security.
- Joseph Michael Moran, QC, Legal Secretary to the Lord Advocate and First Parliamentary Draftsman for Scotland.
- George Walker Moseley, Deputy Secretary, Department of the Environment.
- Derek Leslie Pearson, Deputy Secretary, Ministry of Overseas Development.
- Robert Burnell Roper, Chief Land Registrar.
- Alan Thompson, Deputy Secretary, Department of Education and Science.
- Francis Walley, Under-Secretary, Department of the Environment.
- James Webb, Under-Secretary, Board of Inland Revenue.

Additional Member

- William Frederick Payne Heseltine, CVO, Deputy Private Secretary to The Queen.

=== Order of Saint Michael and Saint George ===
==== Knight Grand Cross of the Order of St Michael and St George (GCMG) ====
- Sir Maurice Oldfield, KCMG, CBE, lately Foreign and Commonwealth Office.

==== Knight Commander of the Order of St Michael and St George (KCMG) ====
- Derick Rosslyn Ashe, CMG, Leader of the United Kingdom Delegation to the Conference of the Committee on Disarmament, Geneva.
- Donald Frederick Hawley, CMG, MBE, British High Commissioner, Kuala Lumpur.
- Herbert Ben Curtis Keeble, CMG, HM Ambassador, Moscow.
- Jeffrey Charles Petersen, CMG, HM Ambassador, Stockholm.

==== Companion of the Order of St Michael and St George (CMG) ====
- Richard Cerdin Griffiths, Under-Secretary, Ministry of Overseas Development.
- Alan Waller Woodruff, Wellcome Professor of Clinical Tropical Medicine, London School of Hygiene & Tropical Medicine.
- Professor Ben Atkinson Wortley, OBE, QC. For services to international law.

Diplomatic Service and Overseas List

- Adrian Clarence Buxton, HM Ambassador, La Paz.
- George Buchanan Chalmers, Minister (Economic), HM Embassy, Tehran.
- Patrick Taylor Davies, OBE, Chief Inspector, Area Courts, Kano State, Nigeria.
- John Christopher Edmonds, CVO, Foreign and Commonwealth Office.
- Timothy John Everard, Counsellor (Economic) HM Embassy, Athens.
- Paul Ronald Ninnes Fifoot, Counsellor (Legal Adviser) United Kingdom Mission to the United Nations, New York.
- Colin Frederick Figures, OBE, Foreign and Commonwealth Office.
- Lord Nicholas Charles Gordon-Lennox, MVO, Counsellor and Head of Chancery, HM Embassy, Paris.
- Michael Hugh Morgan, British High Commissioner, Freetown.
- Robert James O'Neill, lately Foreign and Commonwealth Office.
- John Rowland Rich, Counsellor (Commercial) HM Embassy, Bonn.
- Clifford William Squire, MVO, Counsellor, HM Embassy, Washington.
- Benjamin Leckie Strachan, HM Ambassador, Sana'a.

Australian States

State of New South Wales

- Charles Beynon Lloyd Jones. For services to commerce and the arts.

State of Victoria

- Alfred Dunbavin Butcher, of North Balwyn. For services to the Zoological Board of Victoria.

State of Queensland

- Norman Gregory Joseph Behan, of Bardon. For services to the community particularly in the fields of medicine and the arts.

State of Western Australia

- Ronald Darling Wilson, QC, of Nedlands. For services to the community.

=== Royal Victorian Order ===
==== Knight Commander of the Royal Victorian Order (KCVO) ====
- Sir Hugh Maxwell Casson.
- William Alan Wood, CB.

==== Commander of the Royal Victorian Order (CVO) ====
- Lieutenant Colonel William Dalison Keown-Boyd, OBE.
- Group Captain Desmond Lionel Edmonds, AFC, Royal Air Force.
- Reginald Joffre Elliott, MVO.
- Air Marshal Sir Maurice Lionel Heath, KBE, CB.
- Colonel Frank McEachren, ED, CD.
- Lord Rupert Charles Montacute Nevill.

==== Member of the Royal Victorian Order, 4th class (MVO) ====
- Peter Bacon.
- The Reverend Felix Vivian Allan Boyse.
- Robert George Emberson.
- Frank Reginald Francis, MBE.
- Captain Roland Henry Grimshaw, Irish Guards.
- John Brook Marriott.
- Lieutenant Colonel Trevor le Mare Sharpe, OBE, Coldstream Guards.
- Conrad Marshall John Fisher Swan.

==== Member of the Royal Victorian Order, 5th class (MVO) ====
- Maurice Harold Allen.
- Mabel Anderson.
- Jeffrey Bertram Cackett.
- Norma Rose Dunlop (Norma Wilkins).
- Anne Elizabeth Fisher, MBE.
- Sonia Hill.
- William Hewit Murray Millar.
- Eric Giles Paton, MBE.
- Marguerite Reid.
- Edward Victor Schopman.

=== Royal Victorian Medal (RVM) ===
In Gold

- Joseph Annison.
- James Robert Emmerson.

In Silver

- Betty Bush.
- George Royal Bushell.
- Frank Samuel Cranston.
- Chief Radio Supervisor Albert Deane, J889812Q.
- Donald Edred Easterbrook.
- Charles Elliott.
- Police Constable Roger Charles Fletcher, Metropolitan Police.
- David Stewart Forsyth.
- V0685502 Chief Technician Roger Henry Harris, Royal Air Force.
- William Hudson.
- Police Constable Donald William Jarvis, Metropolitan Police.
- F194S038 Sergeant Michael Edward Legg, Royal Air Force.
- Edward George Murphy.
- S4235891 Master Air Load Master Peter Ronald Stokes, Royal Air Force.
- Alexander Webster.
- Frederick George Wills, BEM.

Bar to the Royal Victorian Medal in Silver

- Sergeant Major Lionel Allibone, Her Majesty's Bodyguard of the Yeomen of the Guard.

=== Order of the British Empire ===
==== Knight Grand Cross of the Order of the British Empire (GBE) ====
Military Division

Royal Air Force

- Air Chief Marshal Sir Peter Le Cheminant, KCB, DFC.

==== Knight Commander of the Order of the British Empire (KBE) ====
Military Division

Royal Navy

- Surgeon Vice Admiral John Stuart Pepys Rawlins, OBE, QHP.

Royal Air Force

- Air Marshal Charles John Williamson Soutar, MBE, QHS.

Civil Division
Australian States

State of Victoria

- The Honourable John Frederick Rossiter, Agent-General for Victoria in London.

==== Dame Commander of the Order of the British Empire (DBE) ====
Civil Division

- Sheila Patricia Violet Sherlock (Mrs. James), Professor of Medicine, Royal Free Hospital School of Medicine.

Australian States

State of Victoria

- Joan Howard Roberts, OBE, of Balwyn. For services to the handicapped.

==== Commander of the Order of the British Empire (CBE) ====
Military Division

Royal Navy

- Commodore Donald Wyndham Beadle.
- Commodore Alan John Leahy, MBE, DSC, ADC
- Commodore Brian Keith Perrin, VRD*, Royal Naval Reserve.
- Captain Patrick Michael Causabon Vincent.

Army

- Brigadier (now Local Major General) John Hugh Bevil Acland (397794), late Scots Guards.
- Colonel John Frederick Dixon-Nuttall, OBE, (380648), late Royal Regiment of Artillery.
- Reverend David Brian Dougall, QHC, (422859), Royal Army Chaplains' Department.
- Colonel Kenneth Grantham-Wright (397419), late Royal Regiment of Artillery.
- Brigadier Charles Ridley Grey (414867), late Corps of Royal Engineers.
- Brigadier (now Acting Major General) Roland Kelvin Guy, DSO, MBE, (397265), late The Royal Green Jackets.
- Colonel Charles Hince (407875), late The Royal Welch Fusiliers.
- Colonel (Local Brigadier) Thomas Anthony Boam, OBE, (424271), late Scots Guards.

Royal Air Force

- Air Commodore Eric Dawson.
- Air Commodore John Melvin Pack.
- Air Commodore David McLagan Scrimgeour, OBE.
- Acting Air Commodore Norman Jackson, OBE.
- Group Captain John Robert Walker, AFC.

Civil Division

- Rowland Gunter Ablett, formerly Headmaster, Hemsworth High School, Wakefield.
- James Cecil Akerman, Managing Director, Mullard Ltd. For services to Export.
- Colin Mervyn Gordon Allen, General Manager, Covent Garden Market Authority.
- William Alwyn, Composer.
- Maurice Percy Ashley, Writer.
- Eric Wilfred Ayers, lately Deputy Director of Research, Telecommunications Headquarters, Post Office.
- Geoffrey Horace Ballard, Farmer, Worcester.
- William Barnes, Director, Carrington Viyella Ltd. For services to Export.
- Professor Kathleen Myra Bell, Member, Council on Tribunals.
- Gilbert Albert Waller Blackman, OBE, Member, Central Electricity Generating Board.
- Eric Thomas Boulter, Director General, Royal National Institute for the Blind.
- Jack Bowthorpe, Chairman, Bowthorpe Holdings Ltd.
- Peter Errington Brewis, Chairman, Brewis Brothers, Ltd.
- Denis King Britton, Professor of Agricultural Economics, Wye College, University of London.
- Alan Thomas Brown, Chief Executive, Oxfordshire County Council.
- William Whitehill Brown, Treasury Valuer, Rating of Government Property Department.
- Philip John Gilbert Buckley, Director of Administration, Metropolitan Police Office.
- John Burgess, Managing Director, Simon Carves Ltd. For services to Export.
- Frederick Stephen Butler, Executive Director, Property Services Agency.
- John Macknight Campbell, Farmer, Berwickshire.
- Captain Norman Francis Carrington, DSC, Royal Navy (Retd.), Assistant Secretary, Home Office.
- John Chalmers, General Secretary, Amalgamated Society of Boilermakers, Shipwrights, Blacksmiths and Structural Workers.
- Professor Joseph Chatt, Director, Unit of Nitrogen Fixation, Agricultural Research Council.
- Anastasios Christodoulou, Secretary, The Open University.
- Denis Grenville Church, OBE, Assistant Secretary, Department of Industry.
- Maurice Hugh Collins, Assistant Secretary, Board of Inland Revenue.
- William Collins, Member, Gateshead Metropolitan Borough Council.
- Betty Tresyllian, Lady Compton, Chairman, Board of Governors, Royal Marsden Hospital.
- Dennis John Crisp, Professor of Marine Biology, University College of North Wales.
- Professor Henry Clifford Darby, OBE. For services to the study of Historical Geography.
- Donald Davies, OBE, Board Member, National Coal Board.
- Peter Francis Dorey, Director, Ferranti Ltd. General Manager, Computer Systems Group. For services to Export.
- James Marshall Dunlop, Chief Executive, Fife Regional Council.
- Robert Grieve Duthie, Chairman, Black & Edgington Ltd., Port Glasgow. For services to Export.
- Richard Brinsley Ford. For services to Art.
- Derek Vivian Gaulter, Director-General, Federation of Civil Engineering Contractors.
- Professor Douglas Chalmers Hague, Member, Price Commission.
- Roy Pollard Harding, Chief Education Officer, Buckinghamshire County Council.
- Wilfrid Gerald Harding, President, Faculty of Community Medicine, Royal Colleges of Physicians in the United Kingdom.
- Professor Bryan Hugh Harvey, Chairman, Advisory Committee on Major Hazards.
- Ian Thomson Henderson, TD, Chairman, Mental Health Foundation.
- Ralph Hammond Innes, Writer.
- Glenda May Jackson, Actress.
- Gilbert James Kelland, QPM, Assistant Commissioner, Metropolitan Police.
- Louis Philip Kentner, Pianist.
- Thomas Hugh Kernohan, OBE, Director, Engineering Employers Northern Ireland Association.
- Charles Spencer King, Director, Product Engineering, Leyland Cars Group, British Leyland Ltd.
- Harold Norman Lamb, Regional Administrator, South East Thames Regional Health Authority.
- Hugh Montgomerie Lang, Chairman, Food and Drink Machinery Sector Working Party.
- Professor Patrick Joseph Lawther, Director, Clinical Section, Toxicology Unit, Medical Research Council.
- Professor Frank James Lelievre. For services to education in Northern Ireland.
- Walpole Sinclair Lewin, Consultant Neurological Surgeon, Addenbrooke's Hospital, Cambridge.
- Tom Lister, QFSM, Chief Fire Officer, West Midlands Fire Brigade.
- Thomas Redshaw Spring Lyon, TD, Chairman, Smaller Firms Council, Confederation of British Industry.
- William Alexander McCahon, President, Ulster Farmers' Union.
- Edward Willett MacGowan, OBE, lately Managing Director, Navy, Army and Air Force Institutes.
- Joan Macintosh, Chairman, Scottish Consumer Council.
- Leonard Charles Mather, Chairman, United Dominions Trust Ltd.
- Raymond Mays. For services to Motor Racing.
- Albert Edward Vanstan Meredith, Chairman, Hereford and Worcester Area Health Authority.
- Ian Alastair Duncan Millar, MC, lately Convenor, Tayside Regional Council.
- Edward Aylett Moore, Chairman, Wheatsheaf Distribution & Trading Ltd.
- Charles Philip (Peter) Morley, MC, Chairman, Unit Construction Co. Ltd.
- James Joseph Mundell, Chairman and Managing Director, James H. Dennis & Co. Ltd.
- Julius Arthur Sheffield Neave, MBE, Director and General Manager, The Mercantile & General Reinsurance Co. Ltd.
- Trevor Robert Nunn, Artistic Director, Royal Shakespeare Company.
- Donald William James Orchard, Assistant Secretary, Training Services Agency.
- Noel Strange Paul, Director, The Press Council.
- Leslie Rundell Pincott, lately Managing Director, Esso Petroleum Co. Ltd.
- Beryl Catherine Platt, Chairman, Education Committee, Essex County Council.
- Sheila Margaret Imelda Quinn, Chairman of the council, Royal College of Nursing.
- William Rawlinson, Assistant Solicitor, Board of Customs & Excise.
- William Francis Raymond, Deputy Chief Scientist, Ministry of Agriculture, Fisheries & Food.
- John Deacon Richards, Architect, Robert Matthew, Johnson-Marshall & Partners, Edinburgh.
- George Barclay Richardson, Secretary to the Delegates and Chief Executive of the Oxford University Press.
- Anthony Elliot Ritchie. For services to education and science in Scotland.
- William Owen Roberts, Assistant Secretary, Department of Health & Social Security.
- Malcolm Owen Robins, Director, Astronomy, Space, Radio & Science, Science Research Council.
- Arnold Robinson, Deputy Chairman, Fisons Ltd.
- Francis Leslie Rose, OBE. For services to the pharmaceutical industry and to the Home Office Forensic Science Service.
- Eric Gerald Rubython, Deputy Chief Executive, Aircraft Group, British Aerospace. For services to Export.
- Sydney Wylie Samuelson. For service to the British Academy of Film and Television Arts.
- John Edward Baines Singleton. Member, City of Bradford Metropolitan District Council.
- Edward Hubert Fleming-Smith, TD, Chartered Surveyor, Smiths Gore & Associates.
- Philip Squire, OBE. For services to local government in Mid-Glamorgan.
- Henry George Stewart, MBE, Director of Studies, Britannia Royal Naval College, Dartmouth, Ministry of Defence.
- Peter Frank Stott, Director-General, National Water Council.
- Harry Street, Professor of English Law, University of Manchester.
- John Anderson Strong, MBE, Professor of Medicine, University of Edinburgh.
- Michael James Thornton, MC, lately Chief, Economic Intelligence Department, Bank of England.
- Colonel Lawrence Turnbull, MC, TD, Chairman, Yorkshire and Humberside Territorial Auxiliary and Volunteer Reserve Association.
- Maurice George Venn, Chairman, London and Home Counties Regional Advisory Council on Education.
- Arthur David Wadey, MBE, lately Controller of Finance, Commonwealth Development Corporation.
- Charles Kay Warrick, Consultant Radiologist, Royal Victoria Infirmary, Newcastle upon Tyne.
- Helen Josephine Watts, Singer.
- William Hugh Webster. For services to Sport.
- Donald John Ingram West, Headmaster, Verdin Comprehensive School, Winsford, Cheshire.
- Harry Darrell Wharton, Senior Technical Adviser, Ministry of Defence.
- Harold Astley Whittall, lately President, Engineering Employers' Federation.
- Frederick William Winslade, OBE. For services to local government in Lewisham.
- Sidney Thomas Wright, lately Deputy Chief Scientific Officer, Ministry of Defence.

Diplomatic Service and Overseas List

- Henry St. John Basil Armitage, OBE, HM Consul-General, Dubai, United Arab Emirates.
- Reginald Charles Calvert. For services to British commercial interests in Nigeria.
- Barrie Nicholas Davies, lately Director, Statistical Division, Economic Commission for Europe, Geneva.
- Norman Chadwick Eckersley, DFC. For services to British commercial interests in San Francisco.
- Douglas Graham Frazer. For services to British commercial interests and the British community in Thailand.
- John Andrew Patrick Hill. For services to British commercial interests in Saudi Arabia.
- Kai-chu Jay. For services to commerce in Hong Kong.
- Jeffrey Richard Jones, Chief Judge, Kano State, Nigeria.
- Rogerio Hyndman Lobo, OBE. For public services in Hong Kong.
- Desmond Arthur McNamara, OBE, QC, Chairman, Public Service Commission, St. Lucia.
- Locksley Trevor Moody, lately Chief Justice of the Cayman Islands.
- Donald Augusto Pagliero, OBE, DFC. For services to the British community in Belgium.
- George Rutherford Sanderson, British Council Representative, Spain.
- Group Captain William Smith, OBE, Royal Air Force (Retd.), lately Member of the International Military Staff NATO, Brussels.
- Catherine Joyce Symons, OBE. For public services in Hong Kong.
- De Forest Wheeler Trimingham. For public services in Bermuda.
- David Mitchell Wallace, OBE. For services to British medical interests in Saudi Arabia.

Australian States

State of New South Wales

- John Bowes Clarkson. For services to industry.
- Richard John Sinclair Laws, OBE. For services to broadcasting and to charity.
- His Honour James Henry Staunton, QC. Chief Judge of the New South Wales District Court.

State of Victoria

- Ian Duncan Watt Macdonald, of Meredith. For services to the sport of horse racing.
- His Honour Judge Desmond Patrick Whelan, Chief Judge of the County Court of Victoria.

State of Queensland

- Franz Konrad Saddler Hirschfeld, of Hamilton. For services to the medical profession.
- Wing-Commander Charles Gordon Chaloner Olive, MBE, DFC, of Runcorn. For services to the community.

State of Western Australia

- Henry William Dettman, of Swanbourne. For services to education.

==== Officer of the Order of the British Empire (OBE) ====
Military Division

Royal Navy

- Surgeon Commander (D) Timothy John Clifford Hall.
- Commander Kenneth Raymond Gayford Harper.
- Commander Donald George Heighway.
- Commander Dennis Arthur Howard.
- Commander Alan Anthony Jackson.
- Chief Officer Diana Margaret Mason, RD, Women's Royal Naval Reserve.
- Commander Alan Philip Seeley, VRD*, Royal Naval Reserve.
- Commander Gilbert John Fordyce Slocock.
- Commander John Patrick Speller.
- Commander Alan John Stafford.
- Lieutenant Colonel Julian Howard Atherden Thompson, Royal Marines.
- Commander Frank Kenneth Trickey.

Army

- Lieutenant Colonel Stephen Francis Cave (424285), The Royal Green Jackets.
- Lieutenant Colonel Robin Wyndham Harman Crawford (432808), The Light Infantry.
- Lieutenant Colonel John Anthony Hare, MBE, (437077), The Light Infantry.
- Reverend James Harkness, Chaplain to the Forces, Second Class (468441), Royal Army Chaplains' Department.
- Lieutenant Colonel John Anthony Haynes (339660), Royal Pioneer Corps.
- Lieutenant Colonel (Technical Aviation Instructor) Kenneth Andrew Mead, DFM, (477498), Army Air Corps.
- Major Alastair George Angus Morrison, MC, (474016), Scots Guards.
- Lieutenant Colonel (Acting) Eric Philip Murphy (109387), Army Cadet Force, Territorial and Army Volunteer Reserve.
- Lieutenant Colonel Alfred James MacGregor Percival (451307), The Cheshire Regiment.
- Lieutenant Colonel Colin James Scott (412061), 6th Queen Elizabeth's Own Gurkha Rifles.
- Lieutenant Colonel Dennis Shaw (448646), Corps of Royal Electrical and Mechanical Engineers.
- Lieutenant Colonel Robert More Stewart, TD, (424724), Royal Army Medical Corps, Territorial & Army Volunteer Reserve.
- Lieutenant Colonel (now acting Colonel) Arthur Thomas Michael Stockdale (426759), Corps of Royal Electrical & Mechanical Engineers.
- Lieutenant Colonel James Robert Templer, MBE. (445984), Royal Regiment of Artillery.
- Lieutenant Colonel The Honourable Peter Nanton Trustram-Eve (400474), The Royal Green Jackets.
- Lieutenant Colonel (Staff Quartermaster) Ronald James Winstone (472713), Royal Regiment of Artillery (now RARO).
- Lieutenant Colonel Peter Robert Buchanan (445805), Royal Corps of Signals.

Royal Air Force

- Acting Group Captain William Henry Croydon.
- Wing Commander Brian John Hunter (609199).
- Wing Commander Thomas Howard Jackson (53062), (Retd.)
- Wing Commander Patrick Howard Lewis, MBE, (607303).
- Wing Commander Philip Morton Marsh (199395).
- Wing Commander Jenkin Alun Morgan (2492961).
- Wing Commander Anthony Mumford (607620).
- Wing Commander Sydney Joseph Palmer, DFC, (153277), (Retd.)
- Wing Commander Peter Taylor (2765692).
- Wing Commander Robin Edwin Vian (507459).
- Wing Commander Robert Alfred Warwick (3500718).
- Acting Wing Commander Roy Kenneth William Glover, DFC, TD, (142033), Royal Air Force Volunteer Reserve (Training Branch).

Civil Division

- Alfred William Abigail. For services to the community in Cleveland.
- Peter Allwood, Principal, Department of Industry.
- Edward Cecil Amey, Member, Watford Borough Council.
- Dennis Arundell (Dennis Drew Arundel). For services to Music.
- Joseph Charles Asher, Administrative Director and Secretary, British Ship Research Association.
- Frederick George Bailey, Chairman, F. Bailey & Son Ltd. For services to journalism.
- Major John Charles Balfour, MC, Chairman, Scottish Association of Youth Clubs.
- Alan Thomas Bardo, Chairman, Herefordshire Small Industries Committee, Council for Small Industries in Rural Areas.
- Thomas Pratt Barlow, Consultant, Rolls-Royce Motors Ltd. For services to Export.
- Walter Leopold Milner-Barry. For services to the National Association of Boys' Clubs.
- Malcolm John Bidgood, Music Adviser, London Borough of Redbridge.
- Harold Colin Black, Director, Aircraft Projects Department, Airworthiness Division, Civil Aviation Authority.
- John David Blackwell, RD, Headmaster, Storrington County Primary School, West Sussex.
- Thomas Bennion Boden, Dairy Farmer, Staffordshire.
- Ronald Francis Boyce, Senior Principal, Board of Customs & Excise.
- John Douglas Brad Shaw, Chairman of Executive Council, Amalgamated Union of Engineering Workers.
- Jack Gordon Brown, Senior Principal, Department of Transport.
- John Ridley Brown, TD, Chairman, Dumfries and Galloway Region Savings Committee.
- James Graeme Berry Bruce, Chief Operating Manager (Railways), London Transport Executive.
- Alexander Campbell, QPM, Chief Constable, Dumfries and Galloway Constabulary.
- Ian Samuel Campbell, Convenor, Highland Regional Council.
- Avigdor Cannon, Head, Department of Design Technology, Shoreditch College of Education.
- Lieutenant-Colonel Malcolm Peverly Carr, Secretary, Western Wessex Territorial Auxiliary & Volunteer Reserve Association.
- John Osborne Cherrington, Agricultural Correspondent, Financial Times.
- Arthur Johnson Cleasby. For service to the community in Rochdale.
- Arthur William Clift, Managing Director, S. & A. Clift (Birmingham) Ltd.
- Arthur Leslie Colbeck, MBE. For services to Sport in the North East.
- Donald Frederick Cooper, Director of Purchasing and Supplies, British Gas Corporation.
- Lettice Ulpha Cooper, Writer.
- John Cordrey, Manager, Personnel Development, Littlewoods Ltd.
- John Fairnington Corkhill. For service to the community in the Isle of Man.
- Harold Cottam, Chairman, Ibis Kendal Holdings Ltd.
- Eileen Cotter, Area Nursing Officer, West Sussex Area Health Authority.
- Anthony Michael Cowland, Economic Adviser, Ministry of Agriculture, Fisheries & Food.
- David Baxter Craig, Vice President, British Fishing Federation.
- John Andrew Crichton, Convenor, Lothian Regional Council.
- David Croft (David John Sharland), Writer.
- Eric Dale, Member, Irvine New Town Development Corporation.
- Francis Whitney Vaughan Dale, Joint Managing Director, Town & Country Building Society.
- George Harold Dalton, Deputy Collector, Board of Customs & Excise.
- John Derham Daniell, Chairman, Thanet Area, National Insurance Local Tribunal.
- Maureen Sylvia Darby, Branch Director, Belfast City Branch, British Red Cross Society.
- Victor Albert Dawes, Principal, Ministry of Defence.
- Robert Warburton Dennis, Foreign and Commonwealth Office.
- Captain Nigel Dixon, Royal Navy (Retd.), Director and Secretary, Royal National Lifeboat Institution.
- Thomas Donaldson, Principal, Rupert Stanley College of Further Education, Belfast.
- Bridget Driscoll, Director of Nursing and Social Work, Soldiers', Sailors' & Airmen's Families Association.
- Frank Roy Eccleshare. For service to the community in Lincoln.
- Richard John Eden, Head of Energy Research Group, Cavendish Laboratory, University of Cambridge.
- Jean Bruce Maitland Ellis, Member, Grampian Area Health Board.
- Peter Vernon Ellis, Director, Worldwide Marketing Group, International Computers Limited. For services to Export.
- Joseph Richard Ellis, Area Administrator, Merton, Sutton and Wandsworth Area Health Authority (Teaching).
- Professor Tom Keightley Ewer, lately Professor of Animal Husbandry, University of Bristol.
- Richard Thomas Fairbairn, Principal, Ministry of Defence.
- Terence Farrell, Architect, Farrell Grimshaw Partnership.
- Douglas John Foskett, Librarian, Institute of Education, University of London.
- Maurice Montague Freeland, Superintending Engineer, Crown Agents.
- George Rollo Gay, Chairman, St. Cuthbert's Co-operative Association Ltd.
- James Chattley George, Principal Professional and Technology Officer, Ministry of Defence.
- Harold Leslie George Gibson, MBE, General President, National Union of Hosiery and Knitwear Workers.
- Leonard Charles Gilbertson, Assistant Accountant and Comptroller General, Board of Inland Revenue.
- Lewis Lawrence Golden, For service to the London Library.
- William Victor Golding, lately Chairman, Transport Users' Consultative Committee for the North East.
- Richard Percy Herbert Goolden, Actor and Broadcaster.
- Kathleen May Leveson-Gower, Chairman, North Yorkshire Probation and After-Care Committee.
- James Percy Graham, Director, British Carbonisation Research Association.
- Annie Stewart Grant, Education Officer, Central Midwives Board for Scotland.
- Douglas Harry Grattidge, lately Senior Principal, Department of Education & Science.
- Edna Eileen Mary Gray. For service to the British Cycling Federation.
- Oswald Victor Hackett, Deputy General Manager and Chief Actuary, Guardian Royal Exchange Assurance Ltd.
- Albert Edward Benjamin Harman, General Manager, Agricultural Mortgage Corporation Ltd.
- Frederick John Hatfield, District Nursing Officer, Kent Area Health Authority.
- William Hawthorne, TD, Director, Northern Ireland Staffs Council for Health & Social Services.
- Eric William Haylock, Editor, Paper.
- Thomas John Heal, Chief Technical Manager, Springfields Works, British Nuclear Fuels Ltd.
- Norman George Heatley. For services to scientific research.
- Wilfred Brooks Heginbotham, Cripps Professor of Production Engineering and Production Management, University of Nottingham.
- William Henderson, Headmaster, John Newnham High School, Croydon.
- Reginald Arthur Hennery, Manufacturing Director, C.A.V. Group Ltd. For services to Export.
- George Brew Hodgson, MBE, Member South East Region, National Savings Committee.
- Norman Charles Honey, Governor, Wormwood Scrubs Prison, Home Office.
- Ralph Spenser Hooper, Divisional Technical Director, Kingston-Brough Division, British Aerospace.
- George Ronald Howe, Deputy National Secretary, Young Men's Christian Association.
- Claire Brooke-Hughes, Social Work Service Officer, Department of Health & Social Security.
- Edna Hughes, General Secretary, National Association of Teachers of the Mentally Handicapped.
- Robert William George Humphreys, lately Chairman, Social Services Committee, London Boroughs Association.
- Elsie Mary Lesley Hyatt, Area Controller, North Yorkshire and Humberside Region 2, Women's Royal Voluntary Service.
- Peter Irwin Montgomery Irwin, KPM, Director of Security, Atomic Energy Security Branch, United Kingdom Atomic Energy Authority.
- James Kenneth Jamison, Director, Arts Council of Northern Ireland.
- Denys Herbert Lough Jemphrey, Sales Director, Herdman Group. For Services to Export.
- John James Jewitt, Managing Director, Footprint Tools Ltd. For services to Export.
- Squadron Leader Louis George Johnson, MBE, DFC, AE. For services to ex-Servicemen.
- John Taylor Kendal, lately Chief Engineer, Bracknell Development Corporation.
- Herbert Edwin Lane, Member, Wolverhampton Borough Council.
- Peter Langmead, Chairman, Regional Land Drainage Committee, Southern Water Authority.
- John Law, Secretary, Scottish Rugby Union.
- Charles Harry Lawrence, MBE, Director, James Purdey & Sons Ltd.
- George Leadbeater, Headmaster, Gordon Boys' School, Woking.
- Meirion Lewis, Director and Chief Executive, Development Corporation for Wales.
- Elisabeth Ruth Littlejohn, Deputy Director, National Council of Social Services.
- Joe Loss (Joshua Alexander Loss), Band-leader.
- Norman Frederick Lowe, Principal, Price Commission.
- John McAreavey, Assistant Controller, Board of Inland Revenue.
- Michael McAtamney, MBE, Assistant Chief Constable, Royal Ulster Constabulary.
- David John McDine, lately Chief Information Officer B, Ministry of Defence.
- John William McIvor, Principal Scientific Officer, Ministry of Defence.
- John Mackay, Chairman and Managing Director, Hugh Mackay & Co. Ltd. For services to Export.
- Eric Wilson Mackman, lately Chairman, Board of Visitors, HM Prison Hull.
- Hugh McLean, Mayor of Carrickfergus, County Antrim.
- Robert McLellan, Playwright.
- Julie-Ann Macqueen, Director, Scottish Council for Single Parents.
- Robert Herman MacWilliam. For services to the Institution of Mining & Metallurgy.
- Daniel Manson, Principal, Department of Employment.
- Daniel Binnie Marshall, Chairman, D. B. Marshall (Newbridge) Ltd., Midlothian.
- Michael Charles Martin, Head, Scientific and Technical Department, Royal National Institute for the Deaf.
- Margaret Evelyn Meades, Secretary, Horserace Betting Levy Board.
- Edwin Ernest Medland, Headmaster, Richmond School, Whitehaven.
- Brenda Dorothy Mee, General Secretary, Royal College of Midwives.
- George MacBeth Menzies, Chairman, North British Steel Group Ltd., Bathgate. For services to Export.
- Maurice William Message, Senior Principal, Science Research Council.
- Peter Carmichael Millar, Clerk to the Society of Writers to Her Majesty's Signet.
- William Thomas Cavendish Miller, Managing Director, Normalair-Garrett Ltd. For services to Export.
- Peter Mills, Principal Professional and Technology Officer, Department of the Environment.
- Archibald John Campbell Mitchell, Senior Principal, Scottish Office.
- James Fairley Moffat, Governor, Jordanhill College of Education, Glasgow.
- John William Moody, QPM, Deputy Chief Constable, Lancashire Constabulary.
- William Henry Morrow. For services to Dentistry in Northern Ireland.
- James Patrick Mel O'Connor, lately Director, Institute of Practitioners in Advertising.
- Richard Sidney Odd, Deputy Chairman, Lansing Bagnall Ltd. For services to Export.
- Mervyn Victor Osmond, lately Secretary, Council for the Protection of Rural England.
- Fay Pannell, Managing Director, Conference Services Ltd. For services to Export.
- Harry Parkin, Director, Personnel and Social Policy, Sheffield Division, British Steel Corporation.
- Henry Deryck Peake. For service to municipal engineering.
- Jimmy Perry, Writer.
- John Charles Peterson, TD. For services to Sport particularly in Wales.
- Maurice Ambrose Pocock, Member, Business Studies Board, Council for National Academic Awards.
- Terence Antony Podesta. For services to Hockey.
- Harold Johnson Porter, QFSM, Chief Fire Officer, Cumbria Fire Brigade.
- David Maxwell Proctor, Consultant, Aberdeen Royal Infirmary.
- John Rae, Head, Monitoring Service, British Broadcasting Corporation.
- Denis Guthridge Rattle, Chairman, Liverpool and Merseyside Branch, English-Speaking Union.
- Dennis George Fielding Rawlinson, Regional Director, Northern Region, National Bus Company Ltd.
- Herbert Arthur Ray, National Secretary, Food Drink Tobacco Agriculture Group, Transport and General Workers Union.
- Professor John Edwin George Raymont, Vice-Chairman, Hampshire Area Health Authority.
- Peter Milner Raynes, DSC, VRD, Director-General, Liverpool Cotton Association.
- Gordon Blair Reid, Director, Thos. & Jas. Harrison Ltd., Harrison Line.
- Joseph Geoffrey Roberts, Regional Pharmaceutical Officer, Merseyside Regional Health Authority.
- Geoffrey Alan Robinson, Secretary, Board of Governors, National Hospital for Nervous Diseases.
- Alan Alistair Ross, President, Ogilvy Benson & Mather Ltd.
- Patrick Ross, QPM, Deputy Chief Constable, Sussex Police.
- John Christopher Rowe, lately Senior Legal Assistant, Public Trustee Office.
- Joyce Lilian Rowley, Chairman, Wales Council for the Disabled.
- Frederick Leonard Sage, Official Receiver, Department of Trade.
- Robert Nicholl Settle, Overseas Projects Director, Dynamics Group, British Aerospace. For services to Export.
- Douglas Raymond Sharp, MBE, Director, Advisory Division, Cement & Concrete Association.
- William Robinson Shirrefs, TD, County Surveyor, Leicestershire County Council.
- Albert Harry Slater, Managing Director, Tate & Lyle Engineering Ltd. For services to Export.
- William George Speakman, lately Director, National Milk Publicity Council.
- Thomas Stephen Stallabrass, lately Director, Anchor Housing Association.
- Harry Prentice Stout, Member, Noise Advisory Council.
- Edward Leslie Streatfield, Chairman, Research Advisory Committee, Water Research Centre.
- Oswald Summers, Senior Principal, Department of Health & Social Security.
- James Taylor, Headmaster, Stepney Green Comprehensive School for Boys.
- Lilian Agnes Mary Lloyd-Taylor, Member, East Hertfordshire District Council.
- Charles London Templeman, Director-General, Purchasing and Stores Department, National Coal Board.
- Raymond Elliott Thomas, Professor of Business Administration, University of Bath.
- Thomas James Thomson, Consultant Physician, Stobhill Hospital, Glasgow.
- Gordon Greenway Tilsley, Chief Executive, Norwich City Council.
- Major Robert Tomlins. For service to the Royal British Legion.
- Henry Toner, Chairman, Catering Industry Training Board, Northern Ireland.
- Charles Frederick Tunnicliffe, Painter.
- Geoffrey Turner, lately Principal, Department of Health & Social Services for Northern Ireland.
- Richard Timmis Turner, Marketing Executive, Civil Engines, Rolls-Royce Ltd. For services to Export.
- Philip Sidney Waddington, Superintending Planner, Department of the Environment.
- Dick Harry Walker, lately Deputy Chairman, Southern Electricity Board.
- William Henry Walton, lately Deputy Director, Institute of Occupational Medicine, Edinburgh.
- Jess Warren, Chairman, Mid Glamorgan Area Health Authority.
- Sidney John West, Director and Chief Executive, Engineering Employers' (West of England) Association.
- George Leach Whiteside, Clerk to the Justices, Chertsey and Woking Petty Sessional Division.
- Evan William Meurig Williams, Chancellor, Priory for Wales, St. John Ambulance Brigade.
- Kathleen Jean Wallace Wilson, Nursing Research Liaison Officer, West Midlands Regional Health Authority.
- Thomas Henry Wright. For services to the Magistracy in Doncaster.
- Geoffrey Richard Miller Yardley, General Dental Practitioner, Lichfield.

Diplomatic Service and Overseas List

- Kenneth Alexander Adcock. For services to the British community in Kenya.
- John Willoughby Breadalbane Annesley. For services to British commercial interests in Malaysia.
- Salvador Emilio Awe. For dental services to the community in Belize.
- Thomas Bambury, MVO, First Secretary (Administration) British High Commission, New Delhi.
- Jack Barrah. For services to wildlife conservation in Kenya.
- Brian Roy Berry, Permanent Secretary, Ministry of External Affairs, Belize.
- Ethel May Biddis. For welfare services to handicapped children in Malta.
- Lionel Geoffrey Blake, JP. For public services in the Falkland Islands.
- Algernon Ivor Boyd. For services to medicine in Antigua.
- Olga Brangman, MBE. For welfare services to children in Bermuda.
- Ian Brett, Director, News Division, British Information Services, New York.
- Edgar Samuel Bridgewater, MBE. For public services in St. Kitts-Nevis-Anguilla.
- James Barry Conway Brown, Science Officer, British Council, Paris.
- Robert Henry Callaghan. For services to British commercial interests and the community in Ghana.
- Walter Antony Caro. For services to British commercial interests and the British community in Germany.
- Kenneth Arnold Henry Cassell, Permanent Secretary to the Chief Minister, Montserrat.
- Leroy Maxwell Clark, MVO, QPM, CPM, Commissioner of Police, Bermuda.
- John Gavin Alexander Clezy. For services to British commercial interests and the British community in Greece.
- William Simpson Coe. For public services in the Cayman Islands.
- Duncan Gordon Conacher, Chief Medical Officer, British National Service, New Hebrides Condominium.
- Elisabeth Mary Cranch Cousens. For medical and welfare services to the community in Indonesia.
- Robert John Cox. For services to the British community in Argentina.
- Francis Crabb, ED, Director of Accounting Services, Hong Kong.
- Charles McKenzie Cullen. For services to British commercial interests and the British community in Saudi Arabia.
- Donald Gumming, HM Consul, British Consulate, Bergen.
- Roger Peter Havard Davies, Regional Education Adviser, British Council, Calcutta.
- The Reverend Dennis Dugdale. For services to the British community in Belgium.
- Donald Gordon Ellis. For services to British commercial interests in Saudi Arabia.
- Malcolm Learmonth Lyall Ellis. For services to British commercial interests in Saudi Arabia.
- John Alexander Flynn. For medical and welfare services to the community in Ethiopia.
- Kenneth Alexis Gomez. For public services in Antigua.
- Leslie William Gordon. For public services in Hong Kong.
- John Hammond. For services to British interests in Guyana and to Anglo-Guyanese relations.
- Roland Ivor Harries. For services to British commercial interests in Japan.
- David Malcolm Harrison, First Secretary and Consul, HM Embassy, Islamabad.
- Captain James Walter Harwood. For services to British commercial interests in Seychelles.
- Patrick Ferrer Hawkins. For services to the British community in Ethiopia and to Anglo-Ethiopian relations.
- John Wilson Henderson. For services to British commercial interests in Malaysia.
- Jack Hirst. For services to University education in Nigeria.
- Nga-ming Ho, Deputy Director of Education, Hong Kong.
- Kendall Allan Hutton. For services to the community in the New Hebrides Condominium.
- Anthony John Jackson. For services to British commercial interests in Nigeria.
- Raymond James Jacques, HM Consul, British Consulate, Venice.
- Eric Michael Johnson. For services to agricultural development in Kenya.
- Annie Khalafallah. For services to the teaching of English in Alexandria.
- Wilfred Robert Ambrose Kimber. For services to British commercial interests and the British community in Karachi.
- John Burke King. For public services in St. Lucia.
- Babera Kirata, Permanent Secretary, Ministry of Finance, Gilbert Islands.
- Richard Ming Lai, Director of Information Services, Hong Kong.
- David Wynn Lewis. For services to British commercial interests and the British community in Liberia.
- James Alexander Maclean. For services to British commercial interests in Canada.
- Christopher W. McDonald. For services to the British community in Japan and to Anglo-Japanese relations.
- Peter Hunter MacDonald, Regional Director, British Council, Berlin. (Deceased.)
- Ian Norman Macleod, lately Honorary British Representative, Kota Kinabalu, Malaysia.
- Edward Arthur Marsden, Court Clerk, Supreme Restitution Court, Herford, Germany.
- Robert Wesley Stuart Mitchell. For services to British commercial interests and the British community in the Netherlands.
- John McDonald Morris, lately Chief Education Officer, British National Service, New Hebrides Condominium.
- Kenneth William Calvert Mount. For services to British commercial interests in Indonesia.
- Albert Augustus Charles Nash, MBE, First Secretary (Commercial), HM Embassy, Rome.
- Bronislaw Nec, lately Chief Projects Officer, Ministry of Agriculture, Malawi.
- Peter Ralph Nelson, Chief Engineer, Ministry of Works and Public Utilities, Solomon Islands.
- The Venerable Archdeacon Reginald Basil Ney, MBE. For services to the British community in Madrid.
- Sidney Edward Payn Nowill. For services to the British community in Istanbul.
- George Percival. For services to British commercial interests in the USA.
- Harry Seddon Pettit. For services to British commercial interests in New Zealand.
- Baron John Phillips, MBE, GM. For services to the British community in Monte Carlo.
- Frank Charles Plunkett. For services to British commercial interests in Thailand.
- The Reverend John Mead Ray. For education and welfare services to the community in Kashmir.
- Captain Teitia Redfern, Chairman, Public Services Commission, Gilbert Islands.
- Edward Flinn Reid. For services to British commercial interests in Germany.
- John Single Martyn Roberts, lately Chargé d'Affaires, HM Embassy, Aden.
- Cornwall Fitz-Herbert Scott. For public services in St. Vincent.
- John Power Barrington Simeon, Deputy British High Commissioner, Ibadan, Nigeria.
- Eunice Maie Redmayne Tattersall. For services to nursing training in Nigeria.
- Bauro Tikana. For public services in the Gilbert Islands.
- Peter Barry Williams, Commissioner of Labour, Hong Kong.
- Reginald Woodward. For services to Anglo-Nigerian relations in Kano.
- Kenneth William Wright. For services to British commercial interests in Australia.
- Edward Milne Younie, First Secretary, British High Commission, Nairobi.

Australian States

State of New South Wales

- Kenneth Leo Brodziak. For services to the theatre.
- Teofila Cohen. For services to education.
- Stella Cornelius. For services to commerce and the community.
- Peter John Waraker Cottrell. For services to industry.
- Richmond Jeremy. For services to medicine.
- Raymond George Maker. For services to the community.
- Richard Chapman Hope Mason. For services to the community.
- John David Newcombe. For services to sport.
- Norman Arthur Pardoe. For services to industry.
- Professor Michael George Pitman, Professor of Biology, University of Sydney.
- The Right Reverend Donald Norman Shearman, Anglican Bishop of Grafton.
- Joyce Fyfe Wylie. For services to education.

State of Victoria

- Ronald G. Cochran, of Sandringham. For services to the sport of trotting.
- Edward Eugene Falk, of Mount Waverley. For services to commerce.
- Donald McLeish Ferguson, of Toorak. For services to hospital administration.
- John Widdis Leslie, of Sale. For services to the community.
- John George Hamilton Refshauge, of Williamstown. For services to sports medicine.
- Allan Gordon Robertson, of Beaumaris. For public service.
- Alice Elizabeth Wilmot, of South Yarra. For services to maternal and child health.
- Oliver Wood, of Drumcondra. For municipal service.

State of Queensland

- William Francis Birmingham, of Nerang. For services to local government.
- Micheli Borzi, of Mareeba. For services to local government and the community.
- The Reverend Canon Alfred Stephen Jull, of Victoria Point. For services to the Church of England in Australia.
- Margaret Mary Kelman, of Buderim. For services to aviation in Queensland, particularly in the promotion of women in aviation.
- Anna Caroline Smith, of Chermside. For services to the photographic industry and community.
- Cyril George Henry Warnick, of Nanango. For services to the dairying industry and community.

State of Western Australia

- Flora McCrae Bunning, of Cottesloe. For services to the arts.
- George Samuel Eves, of Mullewa. For services to the community.
- John Alan Mattinson, of Floreat Park. For services to the community.

==== Member of the Order of the British Empire (MBE) ====
Military Division

Royal Navy

- Lieutenant Commander (SD) John Arthur Andrews.
- Lieutenant Commander Kenneth Eric Brierley.
- First Officer Rita Armenil Brown, Women's Royal Naval Service.
- Lieutenant Commander John Patrick Clarke.
- Lieutenant Commander (SD) William George Dungate, RVM.
- Temporary Lieutenant (SD) Geoffrey Alfred Everett.
- Fleet Chief Cook Kenneth Gibson Fraser, M873446P.
- Fleet Chief Air Fitter (A/E) John Jordan, F822881T.
- Fleet Chief Wren Quarters Assistant Kathleen Jeans Audrey Newman, W076924C.
- Lieutenant Commander (SD) John Albert Price.
- Lieutenant Commander Walter Maitland Thornton, RD, Royal Naval Reserve.
- Lieutenant Commander John Howard Townshend.
- Lieutenant Commander (SCC) George Twizell, Royal Naval Reserve.
- Lieutenant Commander Christopher Gordon Ouseley Walker.

Army

- 6088678 Warrant Officer Class 2 Philip Allard, Welsh Guards.
- Major Michael Graham Rex Anderson (468934), Royal Regiment of Artillery.
- Major John Michael Beckingsale, MC, (456268), Royal Regiment of Artillery.
- Major (Queen's Gurkha Officer) Bhagisor Limbu (477211), 10th Princess Mary's Own Gurkha Rifles.
- 23738469 Warrant Officer Class 2 Peter Anthony Broome, Intelligence Corps.
- Major (Quartermaster) Ronald Gordon Brown (478374), 17th/21st Lancers.
- Major John Alfred Cameron (428429), Royal Corps of Transport.
- 14421653 Warrant Officer Class 2 (Acting Warrant Officer Class 1) Gordon Cammack, The Gordon Highlanders.
- Major Anthony Loftus St. George Stephenson Clarke (426850), The Light Infantry.
- Major Michael Heath Collings (397850), Royal Tank Regiment.
- 22959522 Warrant Officer Class 1 Kenneth James Dakin, 1st The Queen's Dragoon Guards.
- Major Colin Edward Darwin (488613) The Light Infantry.
- Major Bryan Hawkins Dutton (473935), The Devonshire and Dorset Regiment.
- Captain (Quartermaster) Francis Xavier Erdozain (485624), Royal Regiment of Artillery.
- Major (Acting) Thomas Henry Evans (460305), Army Cadet Force, Territorial and Army Volunteer Reserve.
- Major Terence Joseph Finney (482379), Royal Army Educational Corps.
- Captain Michael Anthony Gaffney (496696), Royal Army Pay Corps.
- Major Colin Edward Grundy (443458), Royal Corps of Signals.
- Major Barry John Harban (463348), Royal Corps of Transport.
- Major (Quartermaster) Francis Charles Hobbs (470806), The Parachute Regiment.
- Major (Quartermaster) Ronald James Jeffreys (479912), 4th/7th Royal Dragoon Guards.
- Major Anthony Lionel Oldershaw Jerram (457191), The Worcestershire and Sherwood Foresters Regiment (29th/45th Foot).
- Honorary Major Wallace Ivor Lashbrook, DFC, AFC, DFM, (465008), Army Cadet Force, Territorial & Army Volunteer Reserve (now Retd.).
- Major John Anthony Moreton (403626), 1st The Queen's Dragoon Guards.
- Major John Eric McClintock Newbery (388769), 10th Princess Mary's Own Gurkha Rifles (now Retd.).
- 22818250 Warrant Officer Class 2 Frederick George Orford, Corps of Royal Engineers, Territorial & Army Volunteer Reserve (now Discharged).
- Major (Acting) William Thomas Henry Randall (469673), Army Cadet Force, Territorial & Army Volunteer Reserve.
- 23698352 Warrant Officer Class 1 James Reid, Army Catering Corps.
- 23372796 Warrant Officer Class 1 Alexander Milne Robertson, Royal Army Ordnance Corps.
- Major Peter Robin Rostron (474596), The Gloucestershire Regiment.
- Major Patrick Francis Russell (469844), The Cheshire Regiment.
- 22130882 Warrant Officer Class 2 Joseph Derek Steven, The Duke of Lancaster's Own Yeomanry, Territorial & Army Volunteer Reserve.
- Major Bernard Frank Strange (461982), Royal Corps of Signals.
- Major John Martin Taylor (474069), The Royal Green Jackets.
- 22816273 Warrant Officer Class 2 (Acting Warrant Officer Class 1) Terence Thomas, Corps of Royal Electrical & Mechanical Engineers (now Discharged).
- Major William Cledwyn Teilo Thomas (469510), Royal Army Medical Corps, Territorial & Army Volunteer Reserve.
- Major Louis Thompson, MC, (378378), Royal Corps of Transport (RARO).
- Major (Quartermaster) Thomas Horace Edward Turner (485041), Royal Corps of Transport.
- 23734885 Warrant Officer Class 2 Michael Francis Vaughan, Royal Regiment of Artillery.
- Major (Quartermaster) James Eric Williams (485376), Irish Guards.
- Captain (Acting Major) Alfred Leslie Howard Windsor (490808), The Worcestershire & Sherwood Foresters Regiment (29th/45th Foot).

Royal Air Force

- Squadron Leader Robert Bowie (58022).
- Squadron Leader David John Brinkman (4118083).
- Squadron Leader Patrick George Roland Lock (1334960).
- The Reverend George Brian McAvoy (5200825).
- Squadron Leader Peter John Mellish (4074988).
- Squadron Leader Wallace Hutchinson Ward Norton (3510704).
- Squadron Leader John Adrian Partington (507343).
- Squadron Leader William Stanley Price (2434688).
- Squadron Leader Peter Nimrod Prior (506559).
- Squadron Leader Peter John Thomas (3518708).
- Squadron Leader Laurence Harvey Wright (4038152).
- Squadron Leader George Kenneth Young (506088).
- Acting Squadron Leader George Campbell (1564294), Royal Air Force Volunteer Reserve (Training Branch).
- Flight Lieutenant George David Aram (4231230).
- Flight Lieutenant Michael Arthur Rufus Heald (1813102).
- Flight Lieutenant Roger Charles Jevons (208498).
- Flight Lieutenant Keith Albert Richard Knight (685677).
- Flight Lieutenant Paul Turfery (1940427).
- Flight Lieutenant Geoffrey John Keith Williams (685310).
- Flight Lieutenant Paul Woodward (4220043).
- Warrant Officer Victor Bennett (K0582268).
- Warrant Officer Myrtle May Devine (E2816880), Women's Royal Air Force.
- Warrant Officer Robert George Ford (G4028286).
- Warrant Officer Thomas Gavin, AFM, (H4008785).
- Warrant Officer Raymond Mayes (A4032756).
- Warrant Officer Gordon Reid Menzies (HI920330).
- Warrant Officer Robert Henry Smith (U4017768).
- Warrant Officer Leslie James Stephen (J0592837).
- Warrant Officer Ernest Edward West (B0575951).

Civil Division

- John Frederick Ablett. For service to the community in Cambridge.
- Arthur Samuel Adams. For services to the Tower Hamlets Rifles and 9th & 10th Battalions, The Rifle Brigade Old Comrades' Association & Benevolent Fund.
- Dorothy Rosemary Ainsworth, Inspector Higher Grade, Board of Inland Revenue.
- Derek John Frederick Alldridge, Inspector, Metropolitan Police.
- Arthur Leighton Allen, Land Drainage Officer, Salop County Council.
- Cyril Ambler, Senior Nursing Officer, St. Catherine's Hospital, Doncaster Area Health Authority.
- Andrew Barclay Anderson, Shipyard Manager, Ferguson Brothers (Port Glasgow) Ltd.
- Mary Campbell Anthony, Member, Borders Health Board.
- Roderick James Rogers Armstrong, Chief Engineer (Dynamics), Dowty Rotol Ltd.
- Joan Haigh Ashworth, Senior Administrative Assistant, Association of District Councils.
- Leonard Atherton, Manager, Particle Accelerator Division, MEL Equipment Co.
- Margaret Patricia Austin, Personal Secretary, National Freight Corporation.
- Robert Bailey, Executive Chairman, Lancashire United Transport Ltd.
- Dereck Trevor Bailie, Secretary, County Londonderry Savings Committee.
- John Carter Baily, Upland Management Officer, Lake District Special Planning Board.
- Thomas Douglas Bainbridge, Senior Executive Officer, Department of Health & Social Security.
- Mary Desborough Balding, Chairman, Wantage Centre, Oxfordshire Branch, British Red Cross Society.
- Elizabeth Joan Bamford. For services to Music in Wigan.
- John Henry Barrett. For services to conservation, in West Wales.
- Cyril Beard, Clerical Officer, Ministry of Defence.
- Elsie Lilian Rosa Beaton, Private Secretary to Members of Parliament.
- George Henry Jackson Bell, Senior Executive Officer, Scottish Office.
- Margaret Allison Bell. For services to Save the Children Fund in Northern Ireland.
- Claus Werner Benedict, Managing Director, Porth Textiles Ltd., Rhondda.
- John Berger, lately Regional Secretary, South-West Region, Federation of Civil Engineering Contractors.
- Stanley Ernest Best, Nursing Officer, Laninial House, Cornwall and Isles of Scilly Area Health Authority.
- Guy Waterlow Bingham. For services to journalism in Surrey.
- James Hardie Binnie, Group Personnel Manager, Bridon Ltd., Doncaster.
- St. John Binns, Divisional Organiser, Amalgamated Union of Engineering Workers.
- Lucy Emily Rose Blackwell, Executive Officer, Department of Industry.
- John Timothy Bland, Vice-President, Midland Branch, Sea Cadet Association.
- Sidney Edwin Stanley Bollon, lately Secretary to the Lord Chief Justice of England.
- Harold George Bowles, Treasurer, Somerset and South Avon Wing, Air Training Corps.
- Helen Bradley, Painter.
- Dennis Edward Brazil, Headmaster, Ladypool Primary School, Sparkbrook, Birmingham.
- Douglas Wilson Bremner, Audio Typist, Board of Inland Revenue.
- Richard John Brenton, Inspector Higher Grade, Board of Inland Revenue.
- Ted Broughton, Area Manager, Skipton, Yorkshire Water Authority.
- John Desmond Brown, Chairman, Regional Committee (Bristol), Transport and General Workers Union.
- Major John Joseph Brown, lately Retd. Officer Grade II, Ministry of Defence.
- Leonard Harold Brown. For services to the community in Downham Market.
- William James Bryson, Investigation Officer Class II, Central Headquarters, Post Office.
- John Richard Burr, Higher Executive Officer, Board of Inland Revenue.
- Eric Alfred Busby. For services to the community in Ilkley, West Yorkshire.
- David Hugh Byatt, Chief Immigration Officer, Home Office.
- Patrick James Campbell, Clerical Officer, Ministry of Defence.
- Leslie James Carnall, Principal Nursing Officer, Rampton Hospital, Department of Health & Social Security.
- James Carby Carr, Nursing Officer, Whitecroft Hospital, Isle of Wight Area Health Authority.
- Reginald Charles Tabrum Champ, Assistant Information Officer, Central Office of Information.
- John William Herbert Cheatle, Executive Officer, Cabinet Office.
- Paul Richard Cheffins, Sales Administration Manager, Thames Television Ltd.
- William Harry Clarke. For services to the Magistracy in Hereford and Worcester.
- Walter Robert Clee. For services to the London Federation of Boys' Clubs.
- Gilbert Coates, lately Higher Executive Officer, Department for National Savings.
- Alice Louvain Nicol Cochrane, Emergency Services Organiser, Grampian Region, Women's Royal Voluntary Service.
- Mabs Constance Cockayne, Headmistress, Chorlton Park Junior School, Manchester.
- Stella May Codling, Health Visitor, North Yorkshire Area Health Authority.
- Sidney Walter Cole, Senior Executive Officer, Paymaster General's Office.
- Bartholomew Collins, Editor, International Petroleum Times.
- Gordon Willmore Cook, Water Engineer, Scunthorpe Division, British Steel Corporation.
- John William Horace Cook, Deputy Chairman, West Essex Wing, Air Training Corps.
- Sydney James Cooper. For services to the Scout Association in Wales.
- Cyril Coultish, Chairman, Selby District Council.
- Enid Muriel Coward, Member, Leeds Metropolitan District Council.
- John Alexander Cowe, Professional and Technology Officer Grade I, Department of the Environment.
- Henry Paton Fowler Crawford, Secretary, Scottish Agricultural and Forestry Section, Transport and General Workers Union.
- Gladys Dora Cremer, Administrative Officer, The Fabian Society.
- Kenneth Owen Crowley, Senior Executive Officer, Ministry of Defence.
- John Collins Cunningham. For services to the community in East Belfast.
- Frank Willis Cureton, County Secretary, Cheshire, National Farmers' Union.
- Maire Eibhlin Darbyshire, Collector Higher Grade, Board of Inland Revenue.
- Nora Davidson, Metropolitan District Organiser, Kirklees, Women's Royal Voluntary Service.
- William Hugh Davidson, Electrical Manager, British Shipbuilders (Yarrow (Shipbuilders) Ltd.).
- Dennis James Davies, General Manager, Royal Glasgow Workshops for the Blind.
- Edmund Ernest Davies, Chief Development Engineer, Asquith Division, Staveley Machine Tools Ltd. For services to Export.
- William Owen Davies. For services to the community in Brecon.
- Stanley Victor Deffee, Higher Executive Officer, Home Office.
- Elizabeth Dempsey, Senior Superintendent of Typists, Department of the Environment.
- Roderick Kenneth Dotchin, Chairman, Stewards Committee of The Freemen of the City of Newcastle upon Tyne.
- Margaret Haig Downing, Nursing Officer, Cowley Road Hospital, Oxfordshire Area Health Authority.
- Mollie Violet Drew, Senior Personal Secretary, Ministry of Defence.
- William Cecil Dutton, Chairman, Cheshire County Savings Committee.
- John Edward Alexander Dyball, Head of Department, English and Humanities, South Grove Comprehensive School, Rotherham.
- Sylvia Celia East, Concert Administrator, Royal Philharmonic Society.
- William Frederick Eastwick, Local Committee Member, South Eastern Gas Consumers' Council.
- Fred Eastwood, lately Industrial Relations Officer, Express Dairies Ltd.
- Kathleen Mary Edlington, Vice President, Gainsborough & District Society for Mentally Handicapped Children.
- Benjamin Oswald Edwards, Personnel Officer, Gloucester Works, Imperial Chemical Industries Ltd.
- Cyril George William Edwards, Works Director, Messrs. Wynstruments Ltd.
- William Bramwell Edwards, District Finance Officer, Kent Area Health Authority.
- James Kenneth England, CPM, Chief Superintendent, Durham Constabulary.
- Alexander Morgan Samuel Evans, Head of Department of Food Technology, North Gloucestershire College of Technology, Cheltenham.
- Phyllis Bertha Eynon, Organiser, Citizens' Advice Bureau, Newport, Gwent.
- Alan Bertram Fallowfield, Higher Executive Officer, Metropolitan Police Office.
- Louis Ferrar. For services to the community in Scotland.
- Marjorie Ethel Ferris. For services to the elderly in Devizes.
- Alexander Ferry, Assistant General Secretary, Confederation of Shipbuilding and Engineering Unions.
- Jack Leonard Fisher, Training Service Officer, Grade I, Department of Employment.
- Maud Lilian Ford, Supervisor, Admissions and Emergency Inquiry Service, Whittington Hospital.
- Charles Lewis Forrest, Senior Mill Manager, Brockhouse District Steel Ltd.
- Harold Forster, Area Manager, Manchester Piccadilly, London Midland Region, British Railways Board.
- Olive Ursula Foss, Consultant, City and Guilds of London Institute.
- Edward Worsdell Fox, Reserve Chairman, Supplementary Benefit Appeal Tribunal, Merseyside.
- Jack Wilfred Fuller, Fitting Out Manager, Brooke Marine Ltd. For services to Export.
- Frederick John Gamble, Journalist, Belfast Telegraph.
- Robert Howard Gammon, Director, Southern Science and Technology Forum, University of Southampton.
- Arthur David Garfield, Farmer, Mid Glamorgan.
- Patrick John Garrow, Chief Forester, East Scotland Conservancy, Forestry Commission.
- Joseph Norman Gass, Professional and Technical Officer Grade I, Department of the Environment, Northern Ireland.
- William John Gibson. For services to the National Society of Leisure Gardeners.
- Norman Gifford. For services to Cricket.
- Lilian Cordelia Kathleen Glassby. For services to the community in Pontefract, West Yorkshire.
- Kenneth John Goatcher, Higher Executive Officer, Ministry of Defence.
- Christina Constance Gooch, Representative, The Queen's Gurkha Engineers, Women's Royal Voluntary Service.
- Walter James Gooden, Group Commandant, No. 7 Group, Bedford, Royal Observer Corps.
- Osmond Clive Gray, Manager, Training Centre, South of Scotland Electricity Board.
- Stanley Samuel Grayson, Member, North Kesteven District Council.
- Robert Albert Green, Lately Assistant Treasurer, Greater London Council.
- Kathleen Zia Grieve, Referral Officer, Telephone Referral Service for Adult Literacy (Scotland), British Broadcasting Corporation.
- Roy William Griffin, MM, Chairman, South London Family Housing Association.
- Frank Alfred Grout, Industrial Development Officer, Dyfed County Council.
- Geoffrey Frederick Hadrill. For services to journalism in Buckinghamshire.
- William Haining, Chief Superintendent, Strathclyde Police.
- Frederick Arthur Hale, Deputy Manager, Plaistow Wharf, Tate & Lyle Refineries Ltd.
- John Christopher Hale, Higher Scientific Officer, United Kingdom Atomic Energy Authority.
- Eldwyth Gladys Hall. For services to the London Marriage Guidance Council.
- Mary Hanbury (The Reverend Mother Donatus), Mother Superior of Nazareth House, Cardiff.
- Frederick Lifford Hance, Postal Executive 'B', Head Post Office Medway, South Eastern Postal Region.
- Captain Thomas Hand, lately Harbour Master, Tees and Hartlepool Port Authority.
- Walter Thomas Hanwell, Works Manager, Howard Doris Ltd., Kishorn.
- Basil Hardaker, lately Docks Engineer, Hull, British Transport Docks Board.
- Gladys Ada Youngs Harrison, lately Member, Southwold County Council.
- Olive Mary Harrison, Editor, British Medical Bulletin, British Council.
- William George Hart, Assistant Secretary (Estates & Wayleaves), South Eastern Region, Central Electricity Generating Board.
- Grace Beatrice Hasler, Personal Secretary, British Electric Traction Group.
- John Henry Hawkey, Director and Chief Executive, Ault & Wiborg International Ltd. For services to Export.
- Eric James Haworth, Higher Executive Officer, Department of Health & Social Security.
- Michael Hazelwood. For services to Water Ski-ing.
- Enid Beryl Healy, Higher Executive Officer, Department of Education & Science.
- Edwin Henderson, Foreign & Commonwealth Office.
- Captain Mark Joseph Higgins, lately Commodore-Captain, Sir William Reardon Smith Lines.
- Thomas Richard Higgs, Senior Executive Officer, Board of Customs & Excise.
- William Wilson Hill, Chief Superintendent, Royal Ulster Constabulary.
- Jessie Hinchliffe (Jessie May Rawsthorne), Violinist.
- William John Holland, First Class Clerk, Supreme Court of Judicature of Northern Ireland.
- Major Stanley Charles Holmes, TD, Chief Commandant, City of London Special Constabulary.
- Bertram James Howtard, Assistant Manager, Overseas Service, Navy, Army and Air Force Institutes.
- Herbert Howarth, Headmaster, Danecourt School, Gillingham.
- Ralph William Howes, Chief Cashier, Alvis Ltd.
- Raymond Evan Hufton, Project Designer, Lucas Aerospace Ltd. For services to Export.
- Brian George Charles Huggett. For services to Golf.
- Eric Vivian Hughes, Regional Secretary, Union of Construction, Allied Trades and Technicians.
- Robert Vincent Hughes, lately Higher Executive Officer, Department of Transport.
- Cyril Albert Jackson, Senior Executive Officer, Department for National Savings.
- Richard Arthur Ward Jackson, lately Senior Tutor (Training Nurses for Mentally Handicapped), Broadland School of Nursing, Norwich.
- William Alexander James, Chief Architect, Midlands Housing Consortium.
- Lieutenant Colonel Andrew Jardine, Chairman, Hounslow, Hammersmith and Richmond War Pensions Committee.
- William George Jelley, Deputy Chairman, London Industrial Savings Committee.
- John Owen Jenkins, Member, (Physiotherapy), Council for Professions Supplementary to Medicine.
- Archibald McGillvray Johnston, Higher Executive Officer, Department of Employment.
- Annie Mary Jones, lately Nursing Officer, Tregaron Geriatric Hospital, Dyfed.
- Charles William Jones, Senior Executive Officer, Department of Health & Social Security.
- Frank Jones, Group Officer, No. 12 Group, Bristol, Royal Observer Corps.
- Stanley Bernard Jones, Tax Officer Higher Grade, Board of Inland Revenue.
- Thomas Keaveney. For services to Amateur Rugby League.
- Mary Pickering Keenleyside, Divisional Officer, Social Services Department, Watford and Bushey, Hertfordshire County Council.
- George Kellet, Chairman, Shropshire Savings Committee.
- Regina Lily Kershaw, lately Teacher/Librarian, Montem Infants' School, London.
- Mary Graham Kevis, Senior Executive Officer, Agricultural Research Council.
- Joyce Botcherby Kirtley, Chief Community Relations Adviser, Ministry of Defence.
- Joseph Kitchen, Regional Officer, Yorkshire and North Derbyshire Region, General and Municipal Workers' Union.
- Cyril Edward Lanxon, lately Senior Legal Assistant, Cornwall County Council.
- Robert Melanchthon Large, Director, Morbank Ltd., Pontypridd.
- Douglas Henry Leather, Deputy Clerk to the Justices, Blackburn.
- Cecil Harris Leonard, Conductor, Dyffryn Nantlle Male Voice Choir.
- Marigold Joy Lewis, Senior Lecturer, School of Librarianship, Polytechnic of North London.
- Selwyn John Lewis, Assistant City Building Finance Officer, Birmingham.
- Thomas Downie Lindsay, Member, Cunninghame District Council.
- Ruth Little, Chief Officer, Headquarters, Girls' Nautical Training Corps.
- Douglas Littlewood, Administrator (Capital Development), Trent Regional Health Authority.
- Major Ronald William Livingstone, Staff Officer Cadets, Highlands of Scotland Territorial Auxiliary & Volunteer Reserve Association.
- Frederick Charles Long, Supervisor, Special Reporting, The Press Association Ltd.
- Frederick John Lowden, Senior Executive Officer, Department of Health & Social Security.
- Ruth Margaret Loy, Senior Executive Officer, Office of Population Censuses and Surveys.
- Joan Andrea Caron Lynch. For services to Athletics.
- John McAlister, Surveyor, Board of Customs & Excise.
- Frederick Robert McBride, Fuel Technologist, John Kelly Ltd.
- Peter Henry McCarthy, Administrative Officer, France Area, Commonwealth War Graves Commission.
- Gerald Whinton McClelland. For service to the Soldiers & Airmen's Scripture Readers Association.
- John Francis McClure, Secretary, Northern Ireland District, Boys' Brigade.
- Robert Adam McComb, Superintendent, Royal Ulster Constabulary.
- Edward McConnell, Assistant Head Teacher, St. Mungo's Academy, Glasgow.
- John Alexander McConnell, Chief Superintendent, Royal Ulster Constabulary.
- Evelyn Maud Macdonald. For service to the community in Skye.
- David Matthew, McElhinney, Chief Structures Engineer, Weybridge, Commercial Aircraft Division, British Aerospace (British Aircraft Corporation).
- Thomas Joseph McGann, General Sales Manager, Pye TVT Ltd. For services to Export.
- Jessie Dorothy Mary McKirdy, Employment Nursing Adviser, Department of Employment.
- Pipe Major Donald MacLeod. For services to Piping.
- Hector McNab, Senior Officer, Board of Customs & Excise.
- Alexander Main, Senior Tutor, Faculty of Agriculture, University of Newcastle upon Tyne.
- Frederick Thomas Mansfield. For services to the community, and particularly to young people in Derby.
- Joan Marsden, Floor Manager, Television, British Broadcasting Corporation.
- Thomas Alfred Marshall, Senior Chief Technician, King's College Hospital Dental School.
- John Arthur Matthews, Divisional Officer Grade III, Fire Authority for Northern Ireland.
- William Millar, Assistant Director of Training (Scotland & Northern Ireland), National Water Council.
- Euphemia Miller. For services to the blind in Windsor and Maidenhead.
- Edward Albert Milton. For services to the National Federation of Old Age Pensioners Association in Wales.
- Thomas Walter Myers, Secretary, Cotton Industry War Memorial Trust.
- Harold Naylor, lately Chairman, Steering Group for the Quality of Life Experiment in Stoke-on-Trent.
- Nellie Reid Neave, lately Midwifery Sister, Arbroath Infirmary.
- Frank William Albert Neck, Professional and Technology Officer Grade II, Ministry of Defence.
- Evelyn Irene Nicklin, Education Officer, HM Prison, Moor Court.
- Constance Mary O'Farrell, Secretary, British Laboratory Ware Association Ltd. For services to Export.
- Kenneth Oldham, Headmaster, Whitehough Camp School, Barley, Burnley.
- Frank Edward Oldroyd, Operations Manager (Water Supply), Eastern Division, North West Water Authority.
- Lucinda Jane Prior-Palmer. For services to Horse Riding.
- Aubrey Hugh Parnell, Administrator, Clandon Park, Guildford, National Trust.
- Alfred James Francis Passmore, President, Exeter Branch, Royal Air Forces Association.
- James Paterson, Sales Director, David Carlaw (Engineers) Ltd., Glasgow. For services to Export.
- John Hadyn Paterson, Chairman, Cardiff Central Youth Club.
- Gordon Hinde Pattinson, Higher Scientific Officer, Ministry of Agriculture, Fisheries & Food.
- John Frederick Payne, lately Head Office Keeper, House of Commons.
- Hilary Jean Peacock. For services to canoeing.
- John William Peck, Deputy Area Careers Officer, Cambridgeshire County Council.
- Gladys Marion Pellow. For services to the young and the mentally handicapped in Cornwall.
- Ronald Leslie Pennells. For services to the Royal British Legion.
- Martin Stanford Peters. For services to Association Football.
- Mary Gwenllian Phillips, Secretary, Gwent Branch Historical Association.
- Richard Thompson Pickersgill. For services to the community in Stockton-on-Tees.
- Elisabeth Constance Pike, lately Editor, Aeronautical Quarterly, Royal Aeronautical Society.
- John William Pleasants, Divisional Officer Grade II, Cambridgeshire Fire Brigade.
- Dorothy Margaret Poltock, Area Secretary, North West, King George's Fund for Sailors.
- Lilla Adalaide Selina Pomeroy. For services to the community in Wisbech, Cambridgeshire.
- Dorothy Mabel Powell, London Region Clothing Organiser, Women's Royal Voluntary Service.
- Percy George Brierley Powell, Member, Hereford City Council; Member, Hereford and Worcester County Council.
- Hugh Ebenezer Prance, Professional and Technology Officer II, Ministry of Defence.
- Dorothy Frances Pratt. For services to the community in Droylsden, Manchester.
- Robert Hugh Pritchard, Chairman, Gwynedd Savings Committee.
- Robert William Purves, Unit Organiser, Glasgow Family Service Unit.
- Denis Sherwood Ramsey, General Secretary, Institution of Fire Engineers.
- Margaret Lydia Rankin, Secretary, Vic-Wells Association.
- Wilfred Rawcliffe, Chairman, Central Lancashire District Manpower Committee.
- Margaret Isabella Rawlings, lately Vice-Principal, Paddington College.
- Alys Isabel Wingfield, Lady Reece. For services to Mentally Handicapped Young People.
- Mair Evelyn Reed, Probation Officer, Norfolk Probation and After-Care Service.
- Frederick Clifford Reeves, Contracts Manager, The British Bata Shoe Co. Ltd.
- Norah Alice Renouard, lately Ward Sister, Cherry Lodge, St. Saviour's Hospital, Jersey, Channel Islands.
- Violet Betty Susan Reynolds, Executive Officer, Export Credits Guarantee Department.
- Ena Mary Richardson, Principal Lecturer in Art Education, Preston Polytechnic.
- William Frederick Rishton, General Manager, Trustee Savings Bank of Lancashire and Cumbria.
- Eveline Hilda Roberts, Chairman, Management Committee, Citizens' Advice Bureau, Matlock.
- Gordon Roberts, Convenor, Amalgamated Union of Engineering Workers, Hotpoint Ltd., Llandudno.
- Alice Whitehead Robertson, Head Teacher, Foulden Primary School, Berwickshire, and for services to National Savings in Scotland.
- Lilian May Robertson, lately Secretary, Axminster Division, Soldiers', Sailors' and Airmen's Families Association.
- John Macdonald Ross, General Medical Practitioner, Currie, Midlothian.
- Edward Rowney, Professional and Technical Officer Grade II, Department of Finance, Northern Ireland.
- William John Rundle. For services to the West Somerset Free Press.
- John Mervyn Sanders. For services to the promotion of adult education in Lichfield.
- Frank Edmund Sawyer, Fishery Manager, Services Fly Fishing Association.
- Sidney Eric Scarley, Terminal Manager, Southampton, Freightliner Terminal.
- Donald Milligan Scott, lately Member, Parole Board for Scotland.
- John Richard Scott, Technical Editor, British Library Journals, Rubber & Plastics Research Association.
- Robert Scott, Chief Mining Engineer, North Nottinghamshire Area, National Coal Board.
- Patricia Victoria Seed. For charitable services for the Christie Hospital & Holt Radium Institute, Manchester.
- Phyllis Marion Seymour, Senior Cardiographer, Royal Free Hospital.
- Marjorie Lily Shaw, Assistant Catering Adviser, Essex County Council.
- Joseph Leslie Shepherdson. For services to the Solihull Society for Mentally Handicapped Children.
- Daisy Anne Sheppard, Senior Personal Secretary, Northern Ireland Office.
- Dennis Smales, Senior Executive Officer, Department of Health and Social Security.
- Alman Buntin Smith, lately Member, Wales and South West Conciliation Committee, Race Relations Board.
- Colin Smith. For service to the National Association of Boys' Clubs in Yorkshire.
- Evelyn Louise Smith, Secretary, Devon County Community Savings Committee.
- John Mathers Drummond-Smith, Member, Angus District Council.
- Raymond Stallibrass, Assistant Secretary, Central Board of Finance of the Church of England.
- Leslie Frederick Haig Stanford, Area Manager, South Anglia Area, Eastern Region, British Gas Corporation.
- Phyllis Mary Stanley, Divisional Nursing Officer, Kingston and Richmond Area Health Authority.
- William Gordon Stenhouse, Senior Executive Officer, Department of Health & Social Security.
- Frank Thomas Stephenson, Commercial Manager, British Ropes Ltd., Wakefield.
- Joan Valentine Stiebel, Company Secretary, Central British Fund for Jewish Relief and Rehabilitation.
- Alec Joseph Stroud, Chief Environmental Health Officer, Wellingborough Borough Council.
- William Arthur Stroud, lately Higher Executive Officer, Ministry of Defence.
- George Ernest Tapp, Deputy Chairman, South Eastern Electricity Consultative Council.
- George Burleigh Taylor, Senior Scientific Officer, Department of Transport.
- Glenys Mary Taylor, lately Senior Adviser for Infant Education, Clwyd.
- The Reverend Prebendary William Thomas Taylor, Chairman, Yeovil District Council.
- Ruth Thomas, Headmistress, Widden Infants School, Gloucester.
- William Lewis Thomson, Higher Scientific Officer, Ministry of Defence.
- William John Thornley, Head Teacher, St. Cleopas Primary School, Liverpool.
- John Frederick Tilly, Technical Manager, Submarine Systems Division, Standard Telephones and Cables Ltd.
- Gladys Evelyn Todd, Senior Scientific Officer, British Antarctic Survey, Natural Environment Research Council.
- Phyllis Todd. For services to Old People's Welfare in Clitheroe.
- Bridget Trodden, Nursing Sister, St. Joseph's Nursing Home, Liverpool.
- Norman John Trollope, Footballer, Swindon Town Football Club.
- James Turrington, lately Professional and Technology Officer Grade II, Ministry of Defence.
- Rowland Waite, Mayor's Secretary, City of Salford.
- Edward Arthur Walker, lately Chief Superintendent, Leicestershire Constabulary.
- John Gilbert Black Walker, Personnel Counsellor, IBM United Kingdom Ltd., Greenock.
- Sydney Waller, lately Clerk, Little Missenden Parish Council.
- Hilda Violet Walsh, Assistant Director, The Chest, Heart and Stroke Association.
- John Waterson, lately Assistant Firemaster, Strathclyde Fire Brigade.
- James Fyfe Crockett Waterston, General Medical Practitioner, Lochwinnoch, Renfrewshire.
- Joyce Mollie Watson, Personal Secretary, Birmingham Chamber of Industry and Commerce. For services to Export.
- Margaret Eve Watson, Member, London Borough of Islington.
- Arthur George Wayt, Managing Director, National Counties Building Society.
- Percy Francis Weal, Senior Executive Officer, Department of Health & Social Security.
- David Morgan Webster, Secretary, Scottish National Fat Stock Club.
- Betty Barnes Westgate, Secretary, The Mastectomy Association of Great Britain.
- Sidney Duncan Westrope, Higher Executive Officer, Department of Employment.
- Margaret Jaffrey Wheatley, Senior Executive Officer, Department of Employment.
- John Wheeler. For services to the blind in Colchester.
- Thomas Norman Oldham White, DFC, Divisional Managing Director, Brockhouse Ltd.
- Harold Stanley Whiting, Registry Clerk, Gatwick Airport, British Airports Authority.
- Eric Whittaker, Assistant Works Manager, 748 & 801, Manchester, British Aerospace (Hawker Siddeley Aviation).
- Cyril Whur, Employee Director, Scunthorpe Division, British Steel Corporation.
- Henry Williams, Chairman, Clwyd South Community Health Council.
- Thomas Merville Williams, Executive Officer, HM Stationery Office.
- Kenneth John Winfield, Senior Executive Officer, Office of the Director of Public Prosecutions.
- Violet Alice Winter, County Staff Officer (Cadets), Kent, St. John Ambulance Brigade.
- Richard Woffenden, Local Officer I, Department of Health & Social Security.
- Eric Joseph Woodward, Senior Adviser, School Museum and Resource Service, West Yorkshire.
- Desmond Thomas George Woon, Chief Engineer (Passenger Vessels), Shipping & International Services Division, British Railways Board.
- Keith Worthington, Chairman, Bridgnorth District Council.
- Peter Worthington, General Secretary, National Federation of Fish Friers.

Diplomatic Service and Overseas List

- Phyllis Daisy Aldridge. For nursing and welfare services to the community in the Bahamas.
- Charles Henry Allen. For services to sport in Montserrat.
- Thomas Charles Barrett-Archdeacon, MC, For services to the British community in California.
- Ronald George Bartley, First Secretary (Commercial) British High Commission, Lusaka.
- Henry Clarence Bennett, Extension Officer, Department of Agriculture, Belize.
- Faustina Beeson. For welfare services to the community in Bangladesh.
- John William Pearson Bradley, lately Head of Registry, United Kingdom Delegation to NATO, Brussels.
- Olegaria Bradley. For welfare services to the community in Belize.
- Wilfred Brown, Honorary British Consul, Nouakchott, Mauritania.
- Arthur Stanley Bryant. For services to education and the teaching of English in Argentina.
- Gwindon Marian Buszewicz. For services to forestry development in Honduras.
- Sheik Sulieman Seymour Bux, Superintendent, Health Inspectorate, Urban Services Department, Hong Kong.
- Gwendoline Clarissa Campbell, Accountant, British High Commission, Ottawa.
- Alolae Cati, Senior Surgeon, Medical Department, Gilbert Islands.
- Pak-keung Chan. For welfare services to the community in Hong Kong.
- Henry Thomas Chichon, lately Administrative Officer, Electricity Department, Gibraltar.
- Margaret Joyce Cooper, Personal Assistant to the United Kingdom Permanent Representative United Nations, New York.
- The Reverend Michael John Cooper, SJ. For services to education and the British community in Japan.
- Montague Bertram Cox. For services to the British community in Le Havre.
- Jonathan Danvers Grossman. For services to British commercial interests in Laos.
- Elizabeth Kemp Edwards. For services to education and the community in Freetown.
- Ernest John Evans, Vice-Consul, British Vice-Consulate, Calais.
- John Eardley Faragher, Pro-Consul, HM Embassy, Rabat.
- Susan Frank, lately Personal Assistant to HM Ambassador, Baghdad.
- Alexander Adams Galloway, Senior Superintendent, Public Works Department, Gambia.
- William Henry Goss, JP. For public services in the Falkland Islands.
- Alan Greenwood, Information Officer, British High Commission, Nassau.
- Joseph Nathaniel Gumbs. For services to the community in Anguilla.
- Geoffrey Hamilton. For services to British commercial interests in Japan.
- Pauline Dorothy Harrison, Personal Secretary, HM Embassy, Paris.
- Phyllis Muriel Harwood, Secretarial Assistant, British Consulate-General, Johannesburg.
- John Dyson Hirst, QPM, CPM, Chief Superintendent of Police, Hong Kong.
- Sidney-Herbert Holland. For services to British commercial interests and the British community in Bilbao.
- Charles Wilmoth Huggins. For public services in St. Kitts-Nevis-Anguilla.
- Teresa Olga Hunt, Archivist, HM Embassy, Warsaw.
- Joyce Sybil Hylton, Senior Probation and Welfare Officer, Cayman Islands.
- Peter Robin Jenkins, Warden, Meru National Park, Kenya.
- The Very Reverend Fraser Kapu. For public and community services in the Solomon Islands.
- Jeziel Korinihona. For public services in the Solomon Islands.
- Ka-ming Kwok. For services to sport in Hong Kong.
- Leone Laku. For public services in the Solomon Islands.
- Clarence Henry George Le Cocq, Accountant, British Council, Paris.
- William Davidson Leighton, Assistant Director, Marine Department, Hong Kong.
- Marion Lethbridge. For medical and welfare services to the community in the Ivory Coast.
- Victor Arthur Lister, lately First Secretary, Foreign and Commonwealth Office.
- Joyce Gertrude Lovell. For medical and welfare services to the community in Malaysia.
- Sister Mary Oliva Lynch. For educational and welfare services to the community in the Gilbert Islands.
- Walter McGee McFarlane, lately Personal Assistant, Posts and Telegraphs Department, Kenya.
- Alan Gordon Mackie, Attaché, HM Embassy, Warsaw.
- John Cunningham McRobert, Vice-Consul (Commercial), British Consulate-General, Hamburg.
- Albert George Malcolm, District Commissioner, South Caicos, Turks and Caicos Islands.
- William Thomas Merrills, Vice-Consul (Commercial), British Consulate-General, Naples.
- Stephen Christopher O'Connor, Superintendent of Police, Swaziland.
- Russell Levi Pearman. For services to the community in Bermuda.
- Joseph Otilio Peliza, lately Water Inspector, Public Works Department, Gibraltar.
- Joan Plato. For welfare services to the British community in Berlin.
- James Anton Pompey, Secretary to the Cabinet, St. Vincent.
- Anthony John Reading. For services to the British community in Brussels.
- Ian William Ryman Richards. For services to British commercial interests in Canada.
- Leslie Rubinstein, Commercial Officer, HM Embassy, Copenhagen.
- The Reverend Albert Louis Sacco. For services to the community in the New Hebrides Condominium.
- Nerina Susan Margaret Seabrook, lately Personal Assistant to HM Consul-General, San Francisco.
- Eileen Winifred Selby. For services to the British community in Los Angeles.
- Alesana Seluka, Secretary for Social Services, Tuvalu.
- Herbert Simms, Building Superintendent, Ministry of Works & Supplies, Malawi.
- The Reverend Alfred Victor Smith. For welfare services to the community in Malawi.
- Koloa Talake, Financial Secretary, Tuvalu.
- Geoffrey Tankard. For services to the community in Bermuda.
- Ian King Taylor. For services to the British community in the Bahamas.
- The Reverend Tarieta Teteki. For services to the community in the Gilbert Islands.
- Robert Richard Thomas, Acting Chief Medical Officer, British Virgin Islands.
- Percy Andrew Turnbull, Commercial Officer, British Consulate-General, Sydney.
- Muriel Bamford Turner, lately Personal Assistant, HM Embassy, Washington.
- Glenys Warren, Senior Secretary, British Residency, New Hebrides Condominium.
- Samuel Elsworth Wilson. For services to the community in Bermuda.
- Michael Hing-shuen Wong, Deputy Director of Administration, Civil Aid Services, Hong Kong.
- Roger Walter Woodham, lately English Language Officer, British Council, Vienna.
- Tat-cho Yuen. For public services in Hong Kong.
- Patricia Lloyd Zeppel, Assistant Representative, British Council, Australia.

Australian States

State of New South Wales

- Alexander Charles Anderson, ED. For services to local government.
- Frederick Walter Braid. For services to the community.
- Colin Court Chapman. For services to music and the community.
- Philip Charles Leslie Engisch. For services to the media.
- Keith Dan Glover. For services to youth.
- Thomas Arthur Clark Griffith. For services to the community.
- Percy James Hall. For services to sport.
- Carl Heinrich Theodor Harbaum. For services to the community.
- Yick Chong Louie. For services to the community.
- Moira Joan McGuinness. For services to sport.
- The Very Reverend Father Nicholas Mansour. For services to the community.
- The Reverend Father Bruno Arnaldo Morotti. For services to the community.
- John Frederick Murphy. For services to the community.
- Dorothy Jean Nixon. For services to nursing.
- Ruth Winifred Ross. For services to the community.
- Councillor Geoffrey Albert Smith. For services to local government.
- Patricia Annie Tarlinton. For services to nursing.
- David Frederick Thompson, EM. For services to civil defence.
- Siu Wah Wong. For services to the community.
- Roger Alastair Woods. For services to sport.

State of Victoria

- James Wilfred Gearing, of Surrey Hills. For services to youth.
- Reginald Guyett, of Ocean Grove. For municipal service.
- Councillor Jack Haycraft, of Marysville. For municipal service.
- Thomas Howard Jackett, of Kew. For services to the community.
- Henry George Judkins, of Blackburn. For services to medicine.
- Francis Keenan, of Parkville. For services to the community through parks and recreation areas.
- Betty Constance Lawson, of Carlton North. For services to nursing.
- Mervine James Meek, of Nhill. For municipal service.
- Frederick Wilson Newman, of Bayswater. For municipal service.
- Dorothy Parker, of Flinders. For services to journalism.
- Councillor George Rickard, of Birchip. For municipal service.
- Councillor William Herbert Schier, of Nathalia. For municipal service.
- William Tyndale Smith, of North Balwyn. For services to dentistry.
- Jean Strachan, of Glenroy. For services to returned servicemen.
- David Edward Trickett, of Terang. For services to the community.
- John Dire Wallace, of Rockbank. For municipal service.
- Jessie Ellen White, of Mount Eliza. For services to the community.

State of Queensland

- Josephine Bosly, of Roma. For services to the community and the arts.
- Joseph Stanley Box, of Coorparoo. For services to the building industry.
- Hilda Millicent Burton, of Goomeri. For humanitarian and community services.
- John Daniel Cronin, of Southport. For his contribution to the development of the Gold Coast area.
- Ailsa Ruby Dawson, of Gympie. For humanitarian and community services.
- Charles Hall, of Clayfield. For services to education, particularly to music teaching.
- William Murray Hilton, of Chinchilla. For services to medicine and the community.
- Herbert Spencer Langton, of Yuleba. For services to local authority.
- Sidney Francis Loder, of Mitchelton. For services to youth and the community.
- Herbert Edgar Mitchell, of Moorooka. For services to education and the community.
- Henry Amos Moore, of Kenmore. For services to journalism and the sugar industry.
- Councillor Albert Clive Rolfe, of Springsure. For services to local authority and the community.

State of Western Australia

- Ian James Brayshaw, of Trigg. For services to cricket.
- Helen Jean Duncan, of South Perth. For services to the community.
- William John Hughes, of South Perth. For services to commerce and the community.
- Daniel Samuel Hunt, of Applecross. For his contribution to economic development.
- Captain Douglas William Nielsen. For his contribution to the development of the Dampier and Karratha communities.
- Leslie Steve Walter, of Shelley. For services to the mentally handicapped.

=== Companion of the Imperial Service Order (ISO) ===
Home Civil Service

- Walter Gerard Asquith, Principal, Department of Health and Social Security.
- George Edward Bryant, lately Senior Principal, Ministry of Defence.
- Peter James Robert Bryant, lately Principal Scientific Officer, Ministry of Defence.
- Ambrose Alfred Cornell, Superintending Mechanical and Electrical Engineer, Department of the Environment.
- John Norman Eraser, lately Principal, Department of Employment.
- Maurice Hewett, Principal, Department of Energy.
- Patrick William Jenden, Principal, Department of Health & Social Security.
- Eveline Maud Kent, Inspector of Schools, Department of Education, Northern Ireland.
- Michael Arthur Lawson, Principal Professional and Technology Officer, Ministry of Defence.
- James Wright Logan, Senior Principal, Department of the Environment, Northern Ireland.
- James Lorimer, Principal, Civil Service Department.
- Alexander McDougall, Sheriff Clerk, Paisley.
- Francis Joseph McGowan, Senior Inspector of Taxes, Board of Inland Revenue.
- James Macleod, Principal, Board of Inland Revenue.
- Charles Bertram Minifie, Senior Inspector of Taxes, Board of Inland Revenue.
- Kenneth Oliver Peachey, Principal, Department of Industry.
- Walter Finlay Ross, Principal Professional and Technology Officer, Ministry of Defence.
- James Lennox Shaw, Divisional Veterinary Officer, Ministry of Agriculture, Fisheries & Food.
- Dorothy Florence Stuart, Principal, Department of Trade.
- Francis Joseph Ward, Principal, Department of the Environment.
- Jack Gordon Webley, MC, Area Manager, Department of Employment.
- Ernest Charles White, Senior Principal, Ministry of Defence.

Diplomatic Service and Overseas List

- John Alfred Fortune, ED, Director of Operations, Civil Aid Services, Hong Kong.
- Albert Joseph Gareze, lately Accountant General, Gibraltar.
- Titi Beniata Rimon, Principal, Tarawa Teachers College, Gilbert Islands.
- James Roberts Whitaker, Director of Engineering Development, New Territories Department, Hong Kong.

Australian States

State of New South Wales

- Frank Edmund Pogson, Under-Secretary and Permanent Head of Local Government Department.

State of Victoria

- Francis Robert Moulds, of Kooyong. Lately Chairman of the Forests Commission of Victoria.

State of Queensland

- Neville James Cook, Valuer-General.

State of Western Australia

- John Bertram Roberts, MBE, Clerk of the Legislative Council and Clerk of the Parliaments.

=== British Empire Medal (BEM) ===
Military Division

Royal Navy

- Ordnance Electrical Artificer (O)1 John Bates, M943983M.
- Chief Ordnance Electrical Artificer Douglas Michael Beck, M857494F.
- Colour Sergeant Robert Arthur Beers, P016374U, Royal Marines.
- Chief Marine Engineering Artificer (H) Ronald Sidney Brown, M863S88P.
- Chief Radio Supervisor Arthur William Chaplin, QD981953X, Royal Naval Reserve.
- Chief Radio Supervisor Andrew Ling Chapman, D1281S1G.
- Marine Vincent Clay, P01705GJ, Royal Marines.
- Chief Petty Officer Cook Roy Curtis, M916833D.
- Chief Petty Officer Caterer Leslie Albert Dowse, M947671K.
- Chief Petty Officer Alexander John Forson, FD981352V, Royal Naval Reserve.
- Chief Petty Officer Coxswain Roger Fuller, J930646N.
- Radio Electrical Artificer (A)1 Derek Frederick Godwin, F984630N.
- Chief Petty Officer Steward Victor John Grace, L900828G.
- Ordnance Electrical Mechanician 1 Cedric George Greaves, M893518X.
- Chief Radio Supervisor Ronald Christopher Hill, J778009C.
- Acting Chief Petty Officer Medical Assistant Brian Louis Killick, M968937L.
- Chief Radio Supervisor Stephen Knight, J925504U.
- Acting Radio Electrical Mechanician 1 Alan Austee Knott, D074116W.
- Chief Petty Officer Stores Accountant David Reekie McKerrachar, M978271S.
- Chief Marine Engineering Mechanician (P) Anthony John Heath Ray, D980671K.
- Chief Petty Officer (OPS) Martin Leocadia Redmond, J934379M.
- Petty Officer Physical Trainer Michael John Paul Shone, D078136K.
- Chief Petty Officer Medical Assistant John Colin Summers, M968159Y.
- Colour Sergeant Peter Mothram Walton, P007494W, Royal Marines.
- Marine Engineering Artificer (H)1 Cecil Albert Wells, M758899J.
- Sergeant John Harold Charles Williams, P015658L, Royal Marines.
- Chief Petty Officer Writer Leonard Malcolm Williams, VD984514E, Royal Naval Reserve.
- Chief Marine Engineering Artificer (P)CA George Neville Willmer, M070189U.

Army

- 23941438 Staff Sergeant Kevin James Avery, Royal Corps of Transport.
- 24092690 Sergeant Roy Bernard Bartram, Royal Army Ordnance Corps.
- 24213863 Lance Corporal Malcolm John Berridge, Royal Pioneer Corps.
- 23482113 Staff Sergeant Desmond Paul Bolger, The Royal Irish Rangers (27th (Inniskilling) 83rd & 87th).
- 23242962 Staff Sergeant Keith Clement Patrick Bottomley, The Green Howards (Alexandra, Princess of Wales's Own Yorkshire Regiment).
- 22527359 Staff Corporal Frank Bradwell, The Life Guards.
- 24087047 Sergeant Graham Chaplin, Royal Corps of Signals.
- 24062650 Sergeant Roy Anthony Coe, Royal Army Ordnance Corps.
- 23687883 Corporal (Acting Sergeant) David William Crocombe, Royal Army Ordnance Corps.
- 23874423 Sergeant Winston Alan Davey, Royal Corps of Transport.
- 23877394 Corporal (Acting Staff Sergeant) Barry Davies, Welsh Guards.
- 22831558 Corporal (Lance Sergeant) David Malcolm Davies, Welsh Guards (now Discharged).
- 22121218 Sergeant Jack William Lee Donaldson, Special Air Service Regiment, Territorial & Army Volunteer Reserve.
- 23688150 Sergeant (Acting Staff Sergeant) Terence Dove, Grenadier Guards.
- 24177995 Corporal Thomas Reginald Forrester, The Staffordshire Regiment (The Prince of Wales's).
- 24052616 Corporal (Acting Sergeant) David Robert Gill, Royal Corps of Transport.
- 23847568 Staff Sergeant Trevor Harvey, The Parachute Regiment.
- 22207021 Bombardier William Hemphill, Royal Regiment of Artillery, Territorial & Army Volunteer Reserve.
- 22848549 Sergeant Leslie Colin John Hill, Army Catering Corps.
- 23997561 Sergeant Raymond John Housley, Royal Army Medical Corps.
- 22794307 Staff Sergeant (Local Warrant Officer Class 2) William Lawrence Hutton, 5th Royal Inniskilling Dragoon Guards.
- 23855279 Sergeant Joseph Andrew Jenkins, The Royal Irish Rangers (27th (Inniskilling) 83rd & 87th).
- 21151721 Staff Sergeant Karnabhadur Roka, 2nd King Edward VII's Own Gurkha Rifles (The Sirmoor Rifles).
- 23958154 Sergeant Melvin Kingston, Royal Army Ordnance Corps.
- 24008647 Staff Sergeant (Acting Warrant Officer Class 2) Terence Michael Paul Larvin, The Staffordshire Regiment (The Prince of Wales's).
- 23575589 Sergeant (Acting Staff Sergeant) Allan George Latto, Royal Army Medical Corps.
- 23479591 Staff Sergeant Walter George Brian Lee, Corps of Royal Electrical & Mechanical Engineers.
- 23207604 Corporal William John Lovell, Royal Army Dental Corps.
- 23495072 Staff Sergeant William Lyons, Irish Guards (now Discharged).
- 23683509 Sergeant (Acting Staff Sergeant) Neil Ian MacAulay, Queen's Own Highlanders (Seaforth and Camerons).
- 24021289 Corporal (Lance Sergeant) Stanley Matthew, Scots Guards.
- 24245694 Corporal Ian Roy Roger Moore, The Queen's Regiment.
- 23784487 Staff Sergeant (Acting Warrant Officer Class 2) James Frederick Morrow, Royal Corps of Signals.
- 23674745 Staff Sergeant Alan Graham Notley, The Royal Green Jackets.
- 22530893 Staff Sergeant Reginald John Osborn, The Parachute Regiment, Territorial & Army Volunteer Reserve.
- 22793922 Staff Sergeant Derek Radcliffe Round, Royal Army Ordnance Corps (now Discharged).
- 21152199 Staff Sergeant Sarbadhoj Rai, 7th Duke of Edinburgh's Own Gurkha Rifles.
- 23659481 Sergeant John Anthony Smith, Royal Army Ordnance Corps.
- 23952432 Staff Sergeant Thomas Peter Spiers, Royal Army Medical Corps, Territorial & Army Volunteer Reserve.
- 23890931 Staff Sergeant Dennis Randolph Sweeney, Corps of Royal Engineers.
- 22257222 Sergeant Leonard Francis Theedam, Royal Army Pay Corps, Territorial & Army Volunteer Reserve.
- 23690902 Staff Sergeant John McGregor Neil Walker, Royal Corps of Transport, Territorial & Army Volunteer Reserve.
- 24052645 Sergeant Alan Wareham, Royal Corps of Transport.
- 23677353 Staff Sergeant John Edward Waiterson, Royal Army Ordnance Corps.
- 23499894 Corporal (Local Sergeant) Michael James Watts, Royal Corps of Transport.

Royal Air Force

- Acting Warrant Officer Douglas William Lightfoot (W5015028).
- U4264235 Flight Sergeant Brian Atkiss.
- D0593380 Flight Sergeant (now Warrant Officer) Dennis Wright Brown.
- W4102302 Flight Sergeant John Anthony Buckle, RAF Regiment.
- Q5044043 Flight Sergeant Elwyn Graham Cole.
- N0585661 Flight Sergeant James Walker Gordon.
- Y1940533 Flight Sergeant Barry John Message.
- N4031562 Flight Sergeant Francis Plaits.
- C0588983 Flight Sergeant Edward William Smith.
- L3527197 Flight Sergeant Donald William Stretton, RAF Regiment.
- N0584299 Acting Flight Sergeant Richard Manning.
- E0685723 Chief Technician Gerrad George Barson.
- X4264157 Chief Technician Alvar Bramham.
- B3510091 Chief Technician Brian Codd.
- S0715186 Chief Technician John Desmond Crawford.
- B0682776 Chief Technician Gerald Edgar Fosh.
- Q42S5S70 Chief Technician Peter Charles Harris.
- C068S704 Chief Technician Ian James McKay.
- J058S498 Chief Technician Norman William Roseby.
- E1942154 Chief Technician George Arthur Young.
- F0594139 Sergeant Geoffrey Ralph Bunce.
- F4250930 Sergeant David Buxton.
- B4268405 Sergeant Bryan Hogg.
- W4235895 Sergeant Michael Christopher Hurry.
- P42S0972 Sergeant James Marshall.
- B0594250 Sergeant Anthony David Melville.
- K3528936 Sergeant Victor Hughes Robinson.
- T1940629 Sergeant Robert Edward Rose.
- G4240067 Acting Sergeant George Lowes.

Civil Division
United Kingdom

- Harry Abram, Toolroom Machinist, Military Aircraft Division, British Aerospace, Warton.
- John William Allen, Driver/Operator, Hanwell Garage, London Transport Executive.
- Ellen Archer, National Savings Group Collector, Huddersfield.
- William John Arthurs, Boilerman, Tyrone & Fermanagh Hospital, Omagh, County Tyrone.
- Harry Ashworth, Post Room Worker, John Bright & Brothers, Rochdale.
- Arnold Frank Bailey, Professional and Technology Officer IV, Royal Naval Aircraft Yard Fleetlands, Ministry of Defence.
- David Bailey, Superintendent Caretaker, Dinnington Comprehensive School, Sheffield.
- Alexander Baird, Twist Spinner, Sidlaw Industries Ltd., Dundee.
- Derrick James Barnett, Senior Service Engineer, Westland Aircraft Ltd., Yeovil, Somerset.
- John Louis Bassett, Post Instructor, No. 14 Group (Winchester), Royal Observer Corps.
- Rose Beddow. For services to No. 499 (Port Talbot) Squadron, Air Training Corps.
- Alan Richard Cornell Beech, Macebearer, Charnwood Borough Council, Leicestershire.
- Harry Bennett, Constable, West Midlands Police.
- John James Bennetts, Senior Service Representative, Helicopter Engine Group, Rolls-Royce Ltd., Hemel Hempstead.
- Glenys Birt, Press Operator, Carshalton Central Laundry, South-West Thames Regional Health Authority.
- Ernest William Blewitt, Branch Secretary, Barking Branch, Furniture, Timber and Allied Trades Union.
- George Vincent Bowden, Mechanical Fitter, Hadley Castle Works, GKN Sankey Ltd.
- Frank Joseph Brown, Main Laying Superintendent, East Anglian Water.
- John Burgess, Salmon Fisherman, Crown Estate Commissioners.
- John Martin Camm, Supervisor, Aero Engine Bearing Grinding, Ransome Hoffman Pollard, Stonehouse.
- Frederick William Case, Registered Dock Worker, India and Millwall Docks, Port of London Authority.
- Harold Cates, Cleaner, Sussex Police.
- Olive Champlin, Cook, Judges Lodgings, Carr Manor, Leeds, Lord Chancellor's Department.
- John Chesney, Sergeant, Royal Ulster Constabulary.
- John Richard Cockerell, Attendant Grade 1, University of London.
- Leslie Thomas Collett, Registered Dock Worker, Port of Bristol Authority.
- Wiliam Coupland, Sub Officer, Dumfries & Galloway Fire Brigade.
- Jessie Davidson Coutts, Officer in Charge, Aberdeen Children's Shelter.
- Madge Cownie, Dining Room Supervisor, Royal Infirmary, Edinburgh.
- Frederick William Crome, lately Driver/Operator, Hornchurch Garage, London Transport Executive.
- Millicent Rose Crosdale, Corps Superintendent, Bromley, St. John Ambulance Brigade.
- Ronald Victor George Cross, Maintenance Assistant (Production), Southern Region, British Gas Corporation.
- Duncan Mackenzie Davidson, Mess Hand, RAEC Centre, Wilton Park, Ministry of Defence.
- George Albert Davidson, lately Service Engineer, Herbert & Sons Ltd., Haverhill, West Suffolk.
- John Arthur Whomsley Davies, Welder Plater, Shotton Works, Welsh Division, British Steel Corporation.
- Morgan James Davies, Storekeeper/Time Keeper, Welsh Development Agency, Bridgend.
- John Davine, Contract Supervisor, T. Clarke & Co., Chelmsford.
- Gerald Dawson, Leading Ambulanceman, Lancashire Area Health Authority.
- Albert Dobson, Truck Operator 1, Esso Petroleum Co. Ltd.
- Doris Dover, Draughtswoman, Basildon Development Corporation.
- Francis Thomas Dowdeswell. For service to Horse Racing.
- Peter William David Drury, Senior Steward to the Lord Mayor of London.
- Gavin Nisbet Dryden, lately Lorry Driver, Gupwell Transport Contractors Ltd., Birmingham.
- Harriet Elizabeth Hopkins Dummer. For services to the community in Gorseinon, West Glamorgan.
- Leo Dwyer, Chargehand Storekeeper, Tubes Division, Stockton Works, British Steel Corporation.
- James Frederick Earls, Sergeant, Royal Ulster Constabulary.
- Eileen Alexandra Rose Empson, Telephonist, Forestry Commission.
- David Samuel Evans, Divisional Superintendent, Rhondda, St. John Ambulance Brigade.
- Ronald Evans, Constable, South Wales Constabulary.
- William Ronald Evans, Stores Officer Grade C, RAF Sealand, Ministry of Defence.
- Thomas Alan Fare, Postman, Liverpool Head Post Office, North Western Postal Board, The Post Office.
- Katharine Olive Farringdon, lately Telephonist, Metropolitan Police Office.
- Frederick Leonard Benjamin Farrow, Sergeant, Devon and Cornwall Constabulary.
- Idriswyn Ford, Constable, South Yorkshire Police.
- Frank Foster, Assistant Caretaker/Driver, Fleming Fulton School, Belfast.
- Frederick Charles Fowler, Caretaker, Basildon Development Corporation.
- Norman Gaskell, Postal Executive 'C', Preston Head Post Office, North Western Postal Board, The Post Office.
- Cyril Gibbs, Foreman, Messrs. Whittsome, Civil Engineering Contractors, Pontypridd, Glamorgan.
- Albert Charles Gill, Chargehand Supervisor Portering, Heathrow Airport, British Airports Authority.
- Arthur Edward Gill. For services to the British Legion in the Isle of Man.
- Percy William Goodwin, Electrician, Royal Ordnance Factory, Radway Green, Ministry of Defence.
- Ursula Moxhay Goulding, Meals on Wheels Organiser, Oxfordshire, Women's Royal Voluntary Service.
- Kenneth Wilson Greenhalgh, Grade III Works Overseer, HM Stationery Office.
- Sidney Gutteridge, Messenger, Board of Customs & Excise.
- Charles William Guy, Photoprinter Grade I, Department of Industry.
- Prokppis Hadjijoseph, Foreman at Trades Grade I, British Forces, Cyprus, Ministry of Defence.
- Mabel Pauline Hall. For services to the community in Slough.
- Margaret Halliday, Local Organiser, Brandon and Byshottles, County Durham, Women's Royal Voluntary Service.
- Stanley Halsall, Constable, Cheshire Constabulary.
- Reginald James Hammett, Sub-Officer, Devon Fire Brigade.
- Thomas James Hands, Foreman, Engineering Department, Kettering District, East Midlands Electricity Board.
- William George Hardie, Grinding Machine Operator, Dunlop Ltd., Coventry.
- Reginald Robert Harmon, Storekeeper Grade 4, Ordnance Survey.
- John Albert Thomas Harris, Distribution Maintenance Superintendent, East Midlands Region, British Gas Corporation.
- Elizabeth Hassells. For services to the community in Market Drayton.
- May Ellen Heathcote, Warden, Servite Houses Ltd., London SW.10.
- Lionel Ivor Hemmaway, Constable, Metropolitan Police.
- Dennis John Higgs, Leading Hand, H. J. Godwin Ltd. For services to Export.
- Robert George Hillier, Hospital Metalworker, Royal Naval Hospital Haslar, Ministry of Defence.
- Herbert Hold Brook, Gardener, Haslam Maternity Home, Bolton.
- Ronald Walter Holford, Group Leader, Progress Department, British Aerospace, Filton.
- Roy Albert Hudson, Craftsman I, Royal Signals and Radar Establishment, Christchurch, Ministry of Defence.
- George Raymond Huffen, Coal Face Worker, Newstead Colliery, South Nottinghamshire Area, National Coal Board.
- Doris Lily Hughes, National Savings Group Collector, Downton, Wiltshire.
- John Thomas Hughes, Calf Certifying Officer, Ministry of Agriculture, Fisheries & Food.
- John Ronald Humphrey, Warder Grade V, British Museum.
- Raymond Frederick Humphreys, Chief Maintenance Mechanic, Cunard Steam Ship Co. Ltd.
- Donald Jamieson Irvine, Chief Officer Class II, Scottish Prison Service Training College.
- Florence Maud Jay, School Crossing Patrol, Metropolitan Police Office.
- Cyril Charles Jennings, Training Supervisor, Ransomes, Sims & Jefferies Ltd., Ipswich.
- Cyril John Johns, Auxiliary Coastguard in Charge, HM Coastguard, Portscatho, Cornwall.
- Arnold Jones, Leading Railman (Shunter), Tonbridge, South Eastern Division, Southern Region, British Railways.
- Donald Jones, Sub Officer, Clwyd Fire Brigade.
- Reginald Albert Jupp, Sergeant, Kent Constabulary.
- Edward Kavanagh, Instructor, No. 1329 (Stroud) Squadron, Air Training Corps.
- William Alexander Keith, Warden, Southwark Diocesan Training Centre.
- Dorothy Kemp. For services to the Scunthorpe War Memorial Hospital, Humberside Area Health Authority.
- Allan Christopher Last, Senior Sous Chef, Catering Services Centre (South), British Airways.
- Percy George Layton, Leader, Dosthill Boys' Club, Tamworth, Staffordshire.
- Kenneth Owen Levers, Chargehand of Skilled Labourers, Bickleigh Barracks, Ministry of Defence.
- Leslie Lewin, Sub-Officer, Northumberland Fire Brigade.
- Mary Lineton, National Savings Group Collector, Telford, Shropshire.
- Donald Ling, Chief Petty Officer Instructor, Lincoln Unit, Sea Cadet Corps.
- Elsie May Lingard, Darby and Joan Club Leader, Stockport, Women's Royal Voluntary Service.
- Edwin Llewellyn, Maintenance Foreman, British Aerospace.
- George Percival Lloyd, Non-Tech. Grade D, Calder Hall, British Nuclear Fuels Ltd.
- David William Lock, Craftsman, Admiralty Surface Weapons Establishment, Portsdown, Ministry of Defence.
- John William Macdonald, Ambulance Driver, Wick Area Health Authority.
- Alexander John Macfarlane, Warden, Loch Lomond National Nature Reserve, Nature Conservancy Council.
- Peter Mackay, Assistant to Superintendent, Highlands Fabricators Ltd.
- Hugh Joseph McGilligan, Senior Supervisor, Department of Agriculture, Northern Ireland.
- Beatrice McParland, Jewellery Worker, B. H. Britton & Sons Ltd., Birmingham.
- John Joseph McParland, Sub-Officer, Fire Authority Northern Ireland.
- Katherine Steele Macphte, Sub-Postmistress, Dunvegan, Isle of Skye, Scottish Postal Board, The Post Office.
- Mary McQueen. For services to the community, particularly the Blind, in Tynemouth.
- Gladys Evelyn Malcolm. For services to the community in Gobowen, Shropshire.
- Douglas Charles Patrick Malt, Caretaker, Furzebrook Research Station, National Environment Research Council.
- Jack Martin, Senior Draughtsman, Cabinet Office.
- Douglas John Mason, Foreign & Commonwealth Office.
- Henry Berkley Masson, Civilian Assistant and Instructor, Kent Army Cadet Force.
- Robert Alfred Matthias, Oiler, Rolling Mills Department, Brymbo Steel Works Ltd.
- William Minford, Foreman, Belfast Airport.
- James Joseph Mone, Experimental Worker I, Safety in Mines Research Establishment, Buxton, Department of Employment.
- Frederick William Michael Money, Senior Foreman of Works, Rochester Borstal, Home Office.
- Ivy Daisy Monk. For services to the community, particularly the elderly in Fishponds, Bristol.
- John Montgomery, Piermaster, Caledonian MacBrayne Ltd., Tarbert, Harris.
- William Henry Moore, Assistant, Pattern Shop, Brickhouse Dudley Ltd., West Dudley.
- Georgina Morgan, Fitter, Central Ordnance Depot, Donnington, Ministry of Defence.
- Selwyn Morris, Senior Operator, Melting Shop, Cardiff, British Steel Corporation.
- Jenny Morrison, Sub-Postmistress, Haigh, North Eastern Postal Board, The Post Office.
- Vincent Mulgrew, Checker, Opencast Executive, Maryport, National Coal Board.
- Frank Mullett, Deseamer, Rotherham Works, Sheffield Division, British Steel Corporation.
- Elizabeth Viners Sophia Napier, Member, Edinburgh, Women's Royal Voluntary Service.
- Albert Edward Neal, Foreman Fitter (MT), Property Services Agency, Department of the Environment.
- Elizabeth Louisa Newell, Organiser, Clothing Store, Kew, Women's Royal Voluntary Service.
- William Campbell Norris, Coastguard Officer 1, HM Coastguard, Yealm, Department of Trade.
- Edna Oldham. For services to the Nottinghamshire Branch of the National Children's Homes.
- Anne Lilian O'Reilly, Silver Polisher, Garrard & Sons Ltd., London.
- Nicholas Ernest Ozanne, Permanent Staff Instructor, Elizabeth College, Guernsey, Combined Cadet Force.
- Daisy Park, Officer in Charge, Coble Haugh Children's Home, Inverurie.
- Ronald Henry Parker, Foreign & Commonwealth Office.
- Roy Samuel James Parrott, Sub-Officer, Humberside Fire Brigade.
- Henry Charles Parsons, Divisional Superintendent, District Pool (London), St. John Ambulance Brigade.
- Helen Maud Partridge, Photoprinter Grade I, Property Services Agency, Department of the Environment.
- Elsie Florence Pedder, National Savings Group Collector, Margate.
- James Perkins, Constable, Metropolitan Police.
- Roy Phillips, Boatswain, Royal Maritime Auxiliary Service, Portland, Ministry of Defence.
- May Spence Pigdon, Health and Hospital Welfare Organiser, Richmond, Yorkshire, Women's Royal Voluntary Service.
- Robert Norman Pitman, Supervisory Civilian Instructional Officer Grade I, RAF Cosford, Wolverhampton, Ministry of Defence.
- Brenda Pittaway, Telephonist, Board of Customs & Excise.
- Alice Plant, Senior Messenger, Ministry of Defence.
- Richard John Porteus, General Porter, Northern Ireland Railways Ltd.
- Joan Pringle, District Clothing and Emergency Services Organiser, Alnwick and Berwick Districts, Women's Royal Voluntary Service.
- Kate Quinn, Canteen Worker, Belfast (TS Formidable Unit), Sea Cadet Corps.
- Stanley Edward Raynor, Head Porter, Students Union, University of Sheffield.
- Emerson Herbert Thomas Rew, Sergeant, Metropolitan Police.
- Elizabeth Mary Richards, National Savings Group Collector, Heath, Cardiff.
- Stanley Richards, Superintendent, Miskin Sewage Treatment Works, Welsh National Water Development Authority.
- Stanley Edward Richards, Battery Technician, J. W. Russell Ltd., Watford.
- Matthew John Richmond, Boatswain, Northern Lighthouse Board.
- Richard Mons Namur Ringrose, Foreman, Highways and Transportation Department, Northants County Council.
- David Robertson, Senior Mill Shift Foreman, Glengarnock Works, Scottish Division, British Steel Corporation.
- Amy Robinson, Nurse, Westclox (UK) Ltd., Strathleven, Dumbarton.
- Robert Jesse Rogers. For services to the Scout Association in Hertfordshire.
- Maurice Rowson. For services to the community in Gosfield, Essex.
- Arthur Willoughby Rumbold, Craftsman (Armourer), Royal Military College of Science, Shrivenham, Ministry of Defence.
- William Thomas Rutland, Senior Paperkeeper, Board of Inland Revenue.
- Herbert Saunders, Instructor, Queen Elizabeth Training College for the Disabled, Leatherhead, Department of Employment.
- Alexander Scott, lately Pests Operator, Ministry of Agriculture, Fisheries & Food.
- John Scott, Sergeant, Royal Ulster Constabulary.
- Phyllis Mary Sequeira, lately Supervisor of Telephonists, RNAS Yeovilton, Ministry of Defence.
- Margaret Anderson Shand. For services to the community in Douglas, Lanark.
- Frank Thomas Sharp, Gas Fitter, South Eastern Region, British Gas Corporation.
- John Shaw, lately Senior Messenger, Scottish Land Court.
- Hubert George Sheppard, lately Foreman Grade II, Highways and Transportation Department, Wiltshire County Council.
- Ada Annie Simmons, Forewoman Cleaner, Metropolitan Police Office.
- Derrek Simons, Chief Laboratory Steward, Chemistry Department, Wye College, Ashford, Kent.
- Hugh Alexander John Sinclair. For services to the community in Inverness.
- Fred Smith, Training Officer, Manvers Colliery, South Yorkshire Area, National Coal Board.
- George Arthur Smith, Cartographic Surveyor Higher Grade, Ordnance Survey.
- Kathleen Smith, Assistant Manager, Hospitality, British Broadcasting Corporation.
- Greville Gordon Southam, Handyman, Home Office.
- James George Sparks, Paperkeeper, Department of Industry.
- John James Speed, lately District Superintendent, Wissey Internal Drainage Board, Norfolk.
- Geoffrey William Spiller, Instrument Fitter, Electrical and Musical Industries Electronics, Hayes, Middlesex.
- Charlotte Booth Stephen, Deputy Organiser, London Borough of Hammersmith, Women's Royal Voluntary Service.
- Harry Drawer Steven, Technical Officer, Maintenance Division, Edinburgh Telephone Area, Scottish Telecommunications Board, The Post Office.
- George Edward Stewart, Tug Crew Member, Ocean Transport & Trading Ltd., Cardiff.
- Harold Ernest Swannell, Professional and Technology Officer Grade III, Royal Small Arms Factory, Enfield, Ministry of Defence.
- Florence Sye, Chargehand, Brands & Normans, Belfast.
- George Tait, Supervisor, Ross and Cromarty Division, Department of Roads & Transport, Highland Regional Council.
- John Graham Talboys, Professional and Technology Officer Class II, Engineering Design Division, Culham Laboratory, United Kingdom Atomic Energy Authority.
- Edward William Taylor, Museum Technician Grade II, Department of the Environment.
- Margaret Taylor, School Crossing Patrol, Aberdeen District Council.
- Milton Taylor, Foreman, R. & D. Laboratory, Nuclear Power Co. Ltd.
- Stanley Charles Taylor, Foreman, Birmingham Transmission District, Midlands Region, Central Electricity Generating Board.
- Stanley Telford, lately Caretaker, Old Dalby Primary School, Leicestershire.
- Florence Lucy Thompson. For services to the community in Bromham, Bedford.
- Reginald Isaac Thompson, Ceramic Modeller, Shaw & Copestake Ltd., Stoke-on-Trent.
- Thomas Edwin Thompson, Telephone Operator, Cumbria County Council.
- Cyril Frederick Toop. For services to the community, particularly the British Red Cross Society in Somerset.
- Herbert Edward Charles Tuck, Salvage Worker, Bilsthorpe Colliery, North Nottinghamshire Area, National Coal Board.
- Ruth Tutt, Deputy Local Organiser, Ware, East Hertfordshire Women's Royal Voluntary Service.
- Victor George Vincent, Head Gardener, Chartwell, Westerham, Kent, The National Trust.
- Alwyn Ernest Walker, Foreign & Commonwealth Office.
- John Vincent Wallace, Fitter, C. A. Parsons and Company Ltd., Newcastle.
- Joseph Waldie Wallace, Special Constable, Strathclyde Police.
- Michael John Warner, TV Assembly Foreman, Vinteri Group Ltd. For services to Export.
- Neville Edward Warner, Fitter, Alvis Ltd., Coventry.
- Graham Wass, Overman, South Midlands Area, National Coal Board.
- Douglas Watson, Rough Rounder/Riveter, Frank Wright Shoes Ltd., Kettering.
- James Wheeler, Service Engineer, Southern Gas Region, British Gas Corporation.
- Alan Whitaker, Foreman (Installation Inspection), Halifax District, Yorkshire Electricity Board.
- Clifford Henry White, Shift Engineer, Newark Factory, British Sugar Corporation.
- Thomas Claud Whitehorn, Chief Instructor, Hailsham Training Centre, Sussex.
- Constance May Williams, Commandant, Detachment 302, West Yorkshire Branch, British Red Cross Society.
- George Henry Williams, Shipkeeper, HMS Eaglet, Liverpool, Ministry of Defence.
- Maggie May Williams, Observer, No. 12 Group (Bristol), Royal Observer Corps.
- Trevor Owen Williams, Forest Craftsman, North Wales Conservancy, Forestry Commission.
- Anthony Henry Edward Wilson, Electrician, Public Lighting, East Midlands Electricity Board.
- Margaret Stavert Wilson, Head, Training Department, Barrie Knitwear Ltd., Hawick. For services to Export.
- Ronald Leonard Woodman, Constable, Metropolitan Police.
- Thomas George Woods, Constable, Ministry of Defence Police, Northern Ireland.
- Violet Nancy Woodward, Supervisor, Adrema Section, Distribution Department, British Tourist Authority.
- Florence Vera Wooton, Senior Messenger, Board of Inland Revenue.
- Agnes Ross Wright. For services to the Glasgow Royal Infirmary.

Overseas Territories

- Albert Michael Beiso. For services to sport in Gibraltar.
- Amabelle Olivia Brookes. For services to the community in St. Kitts-Nevis-Anguilla.
- Chan Kim-che, Clerical Officer Class 1, Prisons Department, Hong Kong.
- Chow King-shing, Assistant Inspector of Works, Public Works Department, Hong Kong.
- Herbert Donald Clingham, Sergeant of Police, St. Helena.
- Riteti Eritama, Water Superintendent, Public Utilities Board, Gilbert Islands.
- John Edwin Graham, Building Supervisor, Public Works Department, Belize.
- James Henry Gumbs. For public services in Anguilla.
- Dick Hanuara, Assistant Surveyor, Ministry of Agriculture & Lands, Solomon Islands.
- Kapoa Liufau, Communications Officer, Ministry of Works & Utilities, Gilbert Islands.
- Tapu Livi. For public services in Tuvalu.
- Lo Kam-to, Railway Officer Class 1, Railways Department, Hong Kong.
- Velma Malcolm. For services to the community in the Falkland Islands.
- Moten Naari, Power Station Superintendent, Public Utilities Board, Gilbert Islands.
- Ng Cheuk-tong, Chief Flight Technician, Civil Aviation Department, Hong Kong.
- Myrtle Elaine O'Neal. For services to the community in the British Virgin Islands.
- Sio Patiale, Superintendent, Marine Service, Tuvalu.
- Poon Yui-fung, Interpreter Class 1, Police Department, Hong Kong.
- Alfred Winfield Potter, Caretaker, Government House, Antigua.
- Stafford Henry Samuel, Head Gardener, Government House, Antigua.
- Arthur Guilherne Santos, Officer, Prisons Department, Hong Kong.
- Tsui Po-shu, Clerical Officer Class 1, Police Department, Hong Kong.
- Yeung Chap-lai, Executive Officer Class II, Registration of Persons Office, Hong Kong.

Australian States

State of New South Wales

- Walter Timothy Anderson. For services to the community.
- Konstantin Bosnic. For services to the community.
- William Edward Braithwaite. For services to the State.
- Ernest Michael Carter. For services to local government.
- Arthur Sydney Coleman. For services to the community.
- Ethel Lillian May Gain. For services to the community.
- Margaret Alice Hobson. For services to the community.
- Ernest Hugh Kebby. For services to surf life saving.
- John Mark McCarthy. For services to local government.
- Alexey V. Danilov-Milkowsky. For services to the community.
- Janet Parker. For services to the community.
- Alfred Sidney Pickering. For services to the community and local government.
- John Moses Shannon. For services to the community.
- Thelma Simmons. For services to the community.
- Lance Fitzgerald Studdert. For services to the community.
- Marta Sybaczynskyj. For services to the community.
- Ernest Horace Thorne. For services to the community and ex-servicemen.
- Terence Joseph Timmins. For services to the community.
- Sarah Isabel Vickery. For services to the community.
- Ernest Philip Preston Younger. For services to the community.

State of Victoria

- Malcolm Earl Atkinson, of Mount Eliza. For services to hospital administration.
- Reginald Roy Bennett, of Strathmore. For services to the sport of motor cycling.
- The Reverend Richard Greenshields Butler, of Bentleigh. For services to the Presbyterian Church.
- Francis John Edwards, of Shepparton. For services to football.
- Lillian Lankester Goodwin, of East Brighton. For services to the community.
- Adam Ian Laidlaw, of Tatyoon. For services to the rural community.
- Jean Emery Major, of Cohuna. For services to the community.
- Graeme John Manifold, of Port Albert. For services to the community.
- Bruce McCracken, of Ararat. For services to the community.
- John Ridley McEwen, of East Melbourne. For service in recording historical aspects of the State of Victoria.
- Bessie Marion McGregor, of Ararat. For services to the community.
- Mary Howden Moline, of Malvern. For services to the community.
- Leslie Noel Moore, of Yea. For services to the community.
- Alice May Morgan, of North Coburg. For services to the community.
- Dorothy Margaret Norton, of Swan Hill. For services to the community.
- Jan O'Hoy, of Bendigo. For services to the Chinese community.
- Ronald George Palmer, of Newcomb. For services to youth athletics.
- The Reverend Andrew John Pearce, of Yarraville. For services to the Methodist Church.
- Eleanor Clara May Roberts, of Kyneton. For services to the community.
- Lawrence Oswald Rudolph, of Horsham. For services to the community.
- The Reverend Father Nicholas Simonazzi, of Hawthorn. For services to migrants.
- Ada Vera May Sutherland, of Wangaratta. For services to the community.
- Emily Mona Tobias, of Canterbury. For services to the education of the physically handicapped.
- Philippa Winifred Curwen-Walker, of Merbein. For services to the community.
- Millicent Ward, of Canterbury. For services to elderly citizens.

State of Queensland

- Muriel Irene Broad, of Sherwood. For services to the community.
- Guido Canale, of Hendra. For services to the Italian community and to sport.
- Helen Hermoine Cattermull, of Bundaberg. For services to the community.
- William James Smith-Goodwin, of Gympie. For services to the Scouting Movement.
- Ida Margaret Munro Mackay, of Teneriffe. For services to the community.
- Catherine Ann McKenna, of East Ipswich. For services to the community.
- Louisa Rose McLelland, of Toowong. For services to the Scottish community and Highland dancing.
- Jessie Jean Massie, of Dutton Park. For services in promoting Highland dancing.
- Olive Elizabeth Matthews, of Mundingburra. For services to the community.
- William Edward Mulholland, of Gympie. For services to the community.
- Dorothy Patch, of Sarina. For services to local community affairs.
- Ethel May Ridgway, of Charleville. For services to the community.
- Florence Eva Soymonoff, of Mackay. For services to the Girl Guide movement.
- Louis Albert Horton Walford Vanrenen, of via Chinchilla. For services to the community.
- Constance Maud Jessie Vines, of Ascot. For services to the community.
- Noel Edwin Warburton, of Murgon. For services to local government and the grazing industry.
- Ruth Mary Williamson, of Indooroopilly. For services to the Metropolitan Senior Citizens' Centre, Fortitude Valley.
- Waldemar Howard Winsen, of Petrie Terrace. For services to Queensland Police Citizens Youth Welfare Association.

Western Australia

- Bette Lyla Allison, of Scarborough. For services to netball.
- Margaret Bartlett, of Bayswater. For services to the Girl Guide movement.
- William Joseph Cunningham, of Geraldton. For services to the community.
- Esmee Dorothea Dowdell, of Katanning. For services to the community.
- James Patrick Hall, of Mount Pleasant. For services to ex-Servicemen.
- Gilbert Norman Lewis, of Kojonup. For services to sheep breeding.
- Marjory Winifred Leslie Lewis, JP, of Kojonup. For services to the community through agricultural development.
- Hugh John William Mouritz, of Emu Point. For services to music.
- Margaret Fullarton Randall, of Manjimup. For services to the community.

=== Royal Red Cross (RRC) ===
Royal Navy

- Principal Matron Margaret Elizabeth Collins, ARRC, Queen Alexandra's Royal Naval Nursing Service.

Army

- Lieutenant Colonel Audrey Kathleen Mary Wisdom (445415), Queen Alexandra's Royal Army Nursing Corps.

Royal Air Force

- Wing Officer Renee Annie Penrose, ARRC, (406825), Princess Mary's Royal Air Force Nursing Service.

==== Associate of the Royal Red Cross (ARRC) ====
Royal Navy

- Senior Superintending Sister Teresa Delia Doyle, Queen Alexandra's Royal Naval Nursing Service.
- Fleet Chief Medical Technician Peter Eugene Hayward, M940432H.

Army

- Lieutenant Colonel Isabella Mercer, TD, (469599), Queen Alexandra's Royal Army Nursing Corps, Territorial & Army Volunteer Reserve.
- Major Martha Craig Jack Russell (450317), Queen Alexandra's Royal Army Nursing Corps.

Royal Air Force

- Squadron Officer Sheila Margaret Firth (407582), Princess Mary's Royal Air Force Nursing Service.
- Squadron Officer Pauline Stones (408541), Princess Mary's Royal Air Force Nursing Service (for services at the British Embassy Peking).
- M3523686 Chief Technician Philip Charles Prentice.

=== Air Force Cross (AFC) ===
Royal Navy

- Lieutenant Commander Christopher William Warne.
- Lieutenant Kenneth George Lamprey.

Army

- Lieutenant Colonel James Langdon Dawson (390457), Army Air Corps.

Royal Air Force

- Wing Commander Neil Roger Hayward (608081).
- Wing Commander Roy Charles Humphreyson, MBE, (3150505).
- Wing Commander Graham Adrian Smart, MBE, (3519697).
- Wing Commander Ronald Andrew Fellowes Wilson (608139).
- Squadron Leader Roger Hubert Beazley (4232496).
- Squadron Leader Alexander Freeland Cairns Hunter (2620410).
- Squadron Leader David Anthony Hurrell (2619868).
- Squadron Leader Richard Holgate Needham Rhodes (4231584).
- Squadron Leader Timothy Michael Webb (5200203).
- Flight Lieutenant Derek John Fitzsimmons (4230739).
- Flight Lieutenant Timothy Miles (4232415).

=== Air Force Medal (AFM) ===
Royal Air Force

- L4141822 Flight Sergeant David Ross.
- D8140957 Sergeant Donald Jones.

=== Queen's Commendation for Valuable Service in the Air ===
Royal Navy

- Lieutenant Commander Geoffrey Alan Cavalier.
- Lieutenant Philip Anthony Shaw.

Royal Air Force

- Squadron Leader Geoffrey Brindle (4232215).
- Squadron Leader Peter George Johnson (4231861).
- Squadron Leader Peter Anthony Rowland Jones (2618267).
- Squadron Leader John McRae (4231976).
- Squadron Leader Henryk Rudolf Ploszek, AFC, (4160525).
- Squadron Leader John Edward Rooum, AFC, (4230944).
- Squadron Leader Michael Robert Tanner (685991).
- Squadron Leader Timothy Gane Thorn (608332).
- Squadron Leader Michael Alwyn Vickers, AFC, (204669).
- Flight Lieutenant Michael John Bell (2616076).
- Right Lieutenant John Cable (4232643).
- Flight Lieutenant Richard Arthur Cross (4057357).
- Flight Lieutenant Geoffrey Arthur Danieli (4230952), (Retd.)
- Flight Lieutenant Ian Durston (4232672).
- Flight Lieutenant Stephen Christopher Gruner (608597).
- Flight Lieutenant James Edward Malcolm Mustard (2616344).
- Flight Lieutenant William Vincent Nadin, AFC, (1684987).
- Flight Lieutenant David Walby (4233030).
- Flight Lieutenant Douglas Samuel Wilson (4231993).

United Kingdom

- Peter Frederick Cyril Boniface, Senior Cabin Service Officer, B747 Fleet, British Airways.
- Phillip Charles Branson, Senior Engineer Officer, Flight Engineering Training Superintendent, B747 Flight, British Airways.
- Michael Noel Fermor, Training Captain, British Airways Helicopters Ltd.
- Douglas George King, Civilian Gliding Instructor, Air Cadets General Gliding School, RAF Newton.
- Donald Tanton, Captain, Chief Training Captain, Britannia Airways.
- James Young, Purser, British Airways.

=== Queen's Police Medal (QPM) ===
England and Wales

- Adrian Fraser Canning Clissitt, Chief Constable, Hertfordshire Constabulary.
- Albert Laugharne, Chief Constable, Warwickshire Constabulary.
- Ernest William Bright, Assistant Commissioner, City of London Police.
- Maurice Buck, Deputy Chief Constable, West Midlands Police.
- Robert Ewing Kerr, Deputy Chief Constable, British Transport Police.
- Lancelot Brian Scarth, Deputy Chief Constable, Northamptonshire Police.
- John English, Assistant Chief Constable, Northumbria Police.
- Tom Harrison, Deputy Assistant Commissioner, Metropolitan Police.
- Colin Vernon Hewett, Deputy Assistant Commissioner, Metropolitan Police.
- Alfred Gordon Hope, Commander, Metropolitan Police.
- Donald Harry Sadler, Commander, Metropolitan Police.
- Marjorie Elizabeth Mary Bishop, Chief Superintendent, Kent Constabulary.
- Joseph Coffey, Chief Superintendent, Thames Valley Police.
- Frank Tomlinson, Chief Superintendent, Greater Manchester Police.

Scotland

- Donald Burnie Henderson, Chief Constable, Northern Constabulary.
- Alexander Morrison, Chief Constable, Grampian Police.
- Robert Gray Campbell, Assistant Chief Constable, Strathclyde Police.

Northern Ireland

- Cecil Abraham Russell, Inspector, Royal Ulster Constabulary.

Overseas Territories

- Eric Blackburn, CPM, Assistant Commissioner of Police, Royal Hong Kong Police Force.
- Oriel St. Arnold Hector, Commissioner of Police, St. Christopher-Nevis-Anguilla Police Force.
- Eusebe Alexander Lawrence, CPM, Deputy Commissioner of Police, Royal St. Lucia Police Force.
- James McMaster, CPM, Chief Superintendent of Police, Bermuda Police Force.
- Ensley Luke Pierre, Commissioner of Police, Royal St. Lucia Police Force.
- Edric Kenneth Potter, CPM, Commissioner of Police, Royal Turks & Caicos Islands Police Force.

Australian States

New South Wales Police Force

- Reginald James Douglass, Superintendent 1st Class.
- Maxwell Alexander Fyffe, Inspector 3rd Class.
- William Thomas Peter Holmes, Superintendent 3rd Class.
- Kevan Francis McAuliffe, Superintendent 3rd Class.
- Jack McNeill, Superintendent 3rd Class.
- Edward William Quill, Superintendent 3rd Class.
- Eric Ward Rankin, Superintendent 2nd Class.
- Robert Alexander Sutherland, Superintendent 3rd Class.
- Harry Desmond Tupman, Inspector 3rd Class.

Victoria Police Force

- Rex Wilson Hornbuckle, Sergeant.
- Charles Leslie Keating, Superintendent.
- Harry Morrison, Senior Sergeant.
- James Murtagh, Chief Superintendent.
- Kevan James Snodgrass, Inspector.
- Patrick Francis Walsh, Chief Superintendent.

Queensland Police Force

- Robert Brian Hayes, Superintendent.
- Ernest Horan, Superintendent.
- Anthony Murphy, Superintendent.

Western Australian Police Force

- Bernard Joseph Clarke, Assistant Commissioner.
- Charles Lindsay Napier, Superintendent.

Tasmania Police Force

- Aubrey Patrick Canning, Detective Superintendent.
- Donald John Fenton, Superintendent.
- Douglas James Harris, Superintendent.
- Edwin James Johnstone, Superintendent.
- Maurice Edmund Massie, Inspector.
- Keith Henry Viney, Assistant Commissioner.
- John James Webberley, Superintendent.

=== Queen's Fire Services Medal (QFSM) ===
England and Wales

- Norman Francis Roundell, Assistant Chief Officer, London Fire Brigade.
- Peter Robinson, Divisional Officer Grade 1, Buckinghamshire Fire Brigade.
- Andrew Noel Lightbody, Assistant Chief Officer, Cheshire Fire Brigade.
- Robert Owens, Assistant Chief Officer, Merseyside Fire Brigade.

Scotland

- Philip Stuart Morrison, MBE, Firemaster, Central Region Fire Brigade.

Overseas Territories

- Brian Gray Fender, CPM, Chief Fire Officer, Hong Kong Fire Services.
- Alan James Jones, CPM, Chief Fire Officer, Hong Kong Fire Services.

=== Colonial Police Medal (CPM) ===
- Roy Fitzgerald Baptiste, Assistant Superintendent of Police, Royal Antigua Police Force.
- Abdul Latif Cassumbhoy, Chief Inspector of Police, Royal Hong Kong Auxiliary Police Force.
- Cho-wing Chan, Assistant Divisional Officer, Hong Kong Fire Services.
- Ho-yin Chan, Senior Superintendent of Police, Royal Hong Kong Police Force.
- Kwan-fu Chik, Chief Inspector of Police, Royal Hong Kong Police Force.
- Tommy Kimmen Choy, Superintendent of Police, Royal Hong Kong Auxiliary Police Force.
- Hon-ming Chu, Chief Inspector of Police, Royal Hong Kong Police Force.
- Peter John Clarke, Chief Superintendent of Police, Royal Hong Kong Police Force.
- Barry Ivor Elliott, Chief Inspector of Police, Bermuda Reserve Constabulary.
- Ralph Leonard Ferguson, Deputy Commandant, Bermuda Reserve Constabulary.
- Auguste Francis, Sergeant of Police, Royal St. Lucia Police Force.
- Joseph Frank Cardinal Francis, Deputy Commissioner, St. Christopher-Nevis-Anguilla Police Force.
- Brian Frederick Gravener, Chief Inspector of Police, Royal Hong Kong Police Force.
- Kenneth William Hodgkins, Divisional Officer, Hong Kong Fire Services.
- Mathew Kubebatu, Superintendent of Police, Solomon Islands Police Force.
- Sai-yiu Kwan, Divisional Officer, Hong Kong Fire Services.
- Michael Francis Quinn, Chief Inspector of Police, Royal Hong Kong Police Force.
- Roberto Barnabe Rocha, Chief Inspector of Police, Royal Hong Kong Auxiliary Police Force.
- Ronald William Smith, Senior Superintendent of Police, Royal Hong Kong Police Force.
- Peter Brian Stubbs, Chief Inspector of Police, Bermuda Police Force.
- Tauteba Takanoi, Superintendent of Police, Gilbert Islands Police Force.
- Temaua Tenano, Superintendent of Police, Gilbert Islands Police Force.
- John Albert Thorpe, Senior Superintendent of Police, Royal Hong Kong Police Force.
- Ngor Wan, Principal Fireman, Hong Kong Fire Services.
- Ivor Williams, Assistant Superintendent of Police, Royal Antigua Police Force.
- Kwan Wong, Station Sergeant, Royal Hong Kong Police Force.
- Tai Yuen, Chief Inspector of Police, Royal Hong Kong Auxiliary Police Force.

== Australia ==
=== Knight Bachelor ===
- Richard Kingsland, CBE, DFC, of Campbell, Australian Capital Territory. For public service.
- Colonel Malcolm Hugh McArthur, OBE, of Wollert, Victoria. For service to the meat industry.
- Robert Evelyn Porter, of Gilberton, South Australia. For service to local government and the community.
- John Seymour Proud, of Turramurra, New South Wales. For service to the mining industry.
- Kenneth Harold Vial, CBE, of Kew, Victoria. For service to transport.
- Senator the Honourable Reginald Charles Wright, of New Town, Tasmania. For public and parliamentary service.

=== Order of Saint Michael and Saint George ===
==== Companion of the Order of St Michael and St George (CMG) ====
- Lyndon Raymond Dadswell, of Paddington, New South Wales. For service to sculpture.
- James Francis Lavan, MC, ED, of Cremorne, New South Wales. For service to banking.
- Brigadier John Gilbert McKinna, CBE, DSO, MVO, of Kensington Park, South Australia. For service to veterans.
- The Honourable Mr. Justice Charles Leycester Devenish Meares, of Kirribilli, New South Wales. For service in the field of social welfare, particularly to the handicapped.
- Joyce Ethel, Lady Price, OBE, of Red Hill, Victoria. For service to girl guides.

=== Order of the British Empire ===
==== Knight Commander of the Order of the British Empire (KBE) ====
Civil Division

- The Most Reverend Guilford Clyde Young, of Sandy Bay, Tasmania. For services to the church.

==== Commander of the Order of the British Empire (CBE) ====
Civil Division

- Robert David Garrick Agnew, of Peppermint Grove, Western Australia. For service to industry.
- Neil William Briton, of Kenmore, Queensland. For service to agricultural education.
- Maurice Hearne Byers, QC, of Clifton Gardens, New South Wales. For public service in the field of law.
- Louis William Bircham Engledow, of Deakin, Australian Capital Territory. For public service.
- Richard George Fry, OBE, of Earlville, Queensland. For service to industry.
- Godfrey Alan Letts, of Batchelor, Northern Territory. For parliamentary and public service.
- Professor Russell Lloyd Mathews, of Campbell, Australian Capital Territory. For service to government and to commerce.
- John Paul Wild, of Strathfield, New South Wales. For services to science in the field of radiophysics.
- Professor Jerzy (George) Zubrzycki, MBE, of Yarralumla, Australian Capital Territory. For service to sociology and to migrants.

==== Officer of the Order of the British Empire (OBE) ====
Civil Division

- David Andary, of Berri, South Australia. For service to the fruit industry.
- William Geoffrey Boissevain, of Glen Forest, Western Australia. For service to the arts.
- Harry Lyle Bowey, of Salisbury, South Australia. For service to local government and the community.
- Joseph Brown, of South Yarra, Victoria. For service to the arts.
- Professor the Right Reverend Rolland Arthur Busch, ED, of St. Lucia, Queensland. For service to the church.
- Douglas Arch Campbell, of Buff Point, New South Wales. For services to the pig industry.
- Ian Castles, of Narrabundah, Australian Capital Territory. For public service.
- Vernon Ernest Hollyock, of Kew, Victoria. For service to health in the field of obstetrics and gynaecology.
- Irene Florence Jeffreys, of Hazelwood Park, South Australia. For service to the church, women, children and the aged.
- Victor Edward Jennings, of Mount Eliza, Victoria. For service to the building industry.
- Geoffrey Kolterman Kolts, of Maquarie, Australian Capital Territory. For public service.
- Horace Clive Miller, of Nedlands, Western Australia. For service to aviation.
- Allan George Moffat, of Toorak, Victoria. For service to the sport of motor racing.
- Jean Lewis Malor (Mrs. Mullin), of Darling Point, New South Wales. For service to the law.
- Leonard Antill Pockley, of "Pylara", via Tarago, New South Wales. For service to livestock industries and agricultural education.
- Keith James Rodda, of Mount Eliza, Victoria. For public service to construction.
- Alan Alexander Russell, of Fullarton, South Australia. For services to pharmacy.
- Professor Peter Scott, of Sandy Bay, Tasmania, For service to urban planning.
- Stanley Arthur Thiess, of Caringbak, New South Wales. For service to civil engineering.
- Eileen Scott-Young (Mrs. Cammack), of Penrith, New South Wales. For service to local government and to health.
- John Mervyn Wark, of Red Hill, Australian Capital Territory. For public service.
- Frederick Maxwell Watts, of Killara, New South Wales. For service to youth and the disadvantaged.
- Peter Charles Wickens, of Mosman, New South Wales. For service to the insurance industry.
- The Very Reverend Gillarn Albert McConnell Wood, of New Town, Victoria. For service to the church.

==== Member of the Order of the British Empire (MBE) ====
Military Division

Royal Australian Navy

- Lieutenant-Commander John George Fowler (01337).
- Lieutenant-Commander Norman Eric Goodwin, VRD, (C60402), RAN Reserve.

Australian Army

- Major Kevin James Cheetham, ED, (267669), Royal Australian Infantry (Australian Citizens Military Forces).
- Warrant Officer Class One Peter George Cowan (53419), Royal Australian Infantry.
- Major Ian Mackenzie Guild (216196), Royal Australian Infantry.
- Major Dudley Clive Lever (14703), Royal Australian Electrical and Mechanical Engineers.
- Captain John David Szajner (64276), Royal Australian Engineers.
- Major Robert Barrie Wade (36664), Royal Australian Armoured Corps.

Royal Australian Air Force

- Squadron Leader Alexander Falconar Grant (0319449), RAAF Reserve.
- Flight Lieutenant Ronald Eugene Usher (015711).
- Squadron Leader Peter Sydney Wilkins (0225757).

Civil Division

- Jean Phyllis Mary Austin, of Pymble, New South Wales. For service in the field of law.
- James Edward Barry, of Glen Iris, Victoria, For service to sport and gymnastics and as chairman, Sports Advisory Council.
- John Beach, of Berowra, New South Wales. For service to health, veterans and the aged.
- Matron Priscilla Bevan, of Burwood, New South Wales. For service to health, children and the aged.
- Colin John Bourke, of Blackburn, Victoria. For service to Aboriginal education.
- Captain Harold Geeves Chesterman, DSC, RD, Royal Naval Reserve (Retd.), of Sherwood, Queensland. For public service to transport as master of the MV Cape Moreton.
- Eddina Iris Beatrice Churcher, of Elanora Heights, New South Wales. For service to children as secretary of the Royal Far West Children's Health Scheme.
- Eric John Cooper, of Castle Hill, New South Wales. For service to the poultry industry and to health.
- John Julian Dempsey De Meyrrir, of St. Ives, New South Wales. For service to technology and technical education.
- Thelma Everilda May Dent, of North Adelaide, South Australia. For service to musical education.
- Stewart Richmond Dinnen, of St. Leonards Tasmania. For service to the church.
- Annie Laurie Douglas, of Ainslie, Australian Capital Territory. For public service.
- Jan Andrew Fotheringham, of Dandenong, Victoria. For service to the local government and the community.
- Ronald Gordon Fry, of Castle Cove; New South Wales. For service to the metal trades industry.
- Harold Gordon Gilding, of Tanunda, South Australia. For service to local government, tourism and the community.
- William Alexander Graham, of Dunedoo, New South Wales. For service to the wheat industry.
- Peter John Grimshaw, of Farrer, Australian Capital Territory. For service to university administration.
- Stephen John Hamra, of Kurralta Park, South Australia. For service to local government, sport and the community.
- Vernon Arthur (Bim) Hilder, of Castlecrag, New South Wales. For service to sculpture and to the community.
- Josephine Holloway, of Kirribilli, New South Wales. For public service.
- Melrose Francis Holman, of Devonport, Tasmania. For service to trade and the community.
- Harold Randolph Hughan, of Glen Iris, Victoria. For service to pottery.
- Robert Watson Hughes, of Bonbeach, Victoria. For service to music.
- Robert John Inverarity, of Mount Claremont, Western Australia. For service to cricket.
- Raymond Cecil Isles, of Coffs Harbour, New South Wales. For service to industry and export trade.
- Barbara Jackson, of North Sydney, New South Wales. For service to education, particularly as member of the schools commission for non-government schools.
- Lilian Mary Johnston, of Kensington Gardens, South Australia. For service to children, local government and the handicapped.
- Arnold Robert Kopp, DFC, of Mount Waverley, Victoria. For public service in the field of social security.
- Mavis Jean Lay, of Glen-Iris, Victoria. For public service as a training officer.
- Kaye Mary Lette, of Geilston Bay, Tasmania. For public service to veterans and service to children, the aged and to social welfare.
- Maurice Jabarula Luther, of Lajamanu, via Darwin, Northern Territory. For service to the Aboriginal community.
- Natascha Duschene McNamara, of Adelaide, South Australia. For service to Aboriginals and to Aboriginal education.
- Maxford Frederick Martin, of Lenah Valley, Tasmania. For public service in the field of social security.
- Donald Miles, of Invernell, New South Wales. For service to local government, sport and the aged.
- Ronald Griffith Miller, of Orange, New South Wales. For service to local government, the community and primary industry.
- The Reverend Father Aramis Mirzaian, of Artarmon, New South Wales. For service to the church and migrants.
- Raymond Walker Mitchell, of Gymea, New South Wales. For service to boxing and sports journalism.
- Robert Ian Maxwell Moss. For valuable public service as manager, Ordnance Factory Bendigo.
- Laurence Stanley Mulhall, of Orange, New South Wales. For services to veterans and journalism.
- Lieutenant Colonel Jan Novak, of Liverpool, New South Wales. For service to veterans and migrants.
- Edward Warren Owen Perrin, ED, of Eaglemount, Victoria. For services to military, administrative and Victorian history.
- Trevor William Plumb, of Yarralumla, Australian Capital Territory. For public service in the field of national mapping.
- Robert Edward Richardson, MC, of Sandy Bay, Tasmania. For service to veterans as state president of the TPI Association.
- Councillor Roy Francis (Dick) Turner, of North Bendigo, Victoria. For service to local government, sport and the community.
- George William Walmsley, of East Malvern, Victoria. For service to trade and industry.
- Kenneth Peter Warby, of Concord, New South Wales. For service to the sport of speedboat racing.
- Annie Mavis Webster, of Bendigo, Victoria. For service to music and musical education.
- Edwin Ernest White, of Glendalough, Western Australia. For service to migrants.
- William Alfred Williams, of Strathfield, New South Wales. For service to the wool industry.

=== Companion of the Imperial Service Order (ISO) ===
- Edward James Wilkinson, First Assistant Secretary, Postal and Telecommunications Department.

=== British Empire Medal (BEM) ===
Military Division

Royal Australian Navy

- Petty Officer Leslie Vincent Crowe (R50243).
- Petty Officer John Alexander Edwards (R52681).
- Chief Petty Officer William Warren Lehane (R100608).

Australian Army

- Sergeant (Temporary Staff Sergeant) John Enos Appleyard (36307), Royal Australian Army Ordnance Corps.
- Corporal Ronald John Rockcliffe (5410234), Royal Australian Engineers.
- Corporal Michael Graham Seymour (215694), Royal Australian Electrical and Mechanical Engineers.
- Sergeant Thomas Shales (48646), Royal Australian Signals.
- Staff Sergeant (Temporary Warrant Officer Class Two) Michael Leon Taylor (216503), Royal Australian Army Dental Corps.
- Gunner (Temporary Bombardier) Alan Keith Whiteley (2192036), Royal Australian Artillery, (Australian Citizens Military Forces).

Royal Australian Air Force

- Sergeant Nod Robert Dunstan (A111888).
- Sergeant Terry Robert Giles (A43639).
- Sergeant Ernest Albert Payne (A219058).

Civil Division

- Joyce Margaret Alton, of Albany Creek, Queensland. For services as postmistress.
- Edgar George Apsey, of Randwick, New South Wales. For service in the field of construction.
- James Stewart Ashton, of Floreat Park, Western Australia. For service to the handicapped.
- Sallie Atkinson, of Epping North, New South Wales. For public service to the CSIRO.
- Eric Harold Brown, of Tocumeval, New South Wales. For service to local government and the community.
- Mary Kathleen Clare Cocking, of Bankstown, New South Wales. For services to health.
- Neville Alfred James Cullen, of Bundaberg, Queensland. For service to rowing.
- Reginald Williams Dalton, of Kingscliff, New South Wales. For service to sport and the community.
- Peter Daniel, of Strathmore, Victoria. For service as a car driver.
- Priscilla Mary Jane Doyle, of St. Helens, Tasmania. For service to the Red Cross and the community.
- Daisy Elms, of Coombabah, Tasmania. For service to veterans and the community.
- Ivy Ellavine Evans, of Magill, South Australia. For service to health and the community.
- Margaret Hope Figtree, of Hurstville, New South Wales. For service to health.
- Norman George Flannery, of Moreland, Victoria. For public service and service to migrants and the handicapped.
- Freda Frelek, of Trevallyn, Tasmania. For service to migrants.
- Maeva Elizabeth Galloway, of Forrest, Australian Capital Territory. For service to music.
- Henry Thomond Garland, of Barraba, New South Wales. For service to veterans and the aged.
- Frederick Edward Gavin, of West Wollongong, New South Wales. For service to archery.
- Wallace Edward Grubb, of Lenah Valley, Tasmania. For public service in the field of telecommunications and for service to veterans, youth and sport.
- Francis Joseph Gumbley, of Homebush, New South Wales. For service to the meat industry and charities.
- Frederick James Hall, of Grafton, New South Wales. For service to the surf life saving movement.
- Ruby Aileen Hancock, of Reid, Australian Capital Territory. For service to the handicapped.
- William Allan Hardwick, of Glenorchy, Tasmania. For service to veterans and to youth.
- Peter Ernest Harrison, of Dubbo, New South Wales. For public service in the field of civil aviation.
- Blodwen Morwenna Holy, of North Melbourne, Victoria. For public service and service to veterans.
- Anthony Jay, AFC, of Fullarton, South Australia. For public service as Range Overseer, Woomera.
- Edmund Trevor Holmes Jowett, of Launceston, Tasmania. For service to motorcycling.
- Brother Damian (Kevin Ronald) Keane, of Lilydale, Victoria. For service to the mentally handicapped.
- Arthur Beresford Leigh, of Corinda, Queensland. For public service in the field of construction.
- Keith Henry Line, Clontarf, New South Wales. For service to skiing, youth and the community.
- Amy Jessie Macgoun, of Castle Hill, New South Wales. For service to youth and equestrian sport.
- Ian Trevor McIvor, of Toowoomba, Queensland. For service to youth.
- Samuel Richard Martin, of Eurongilly, via Junee, New South Wales. For service to local government and the community.
- Dorothea Cecelia Mitchell, of Beecroft, New South Wales. For service to the arts and the community.
- Harvey Charles O'Neill, of Lake Placid, via Cairns, Queensland. For public service in the field of employment.
- Mary Madelaine Theodora O'Sullivan, of Toarak, Victoria. For service to the Red Cross.
- Sheila Mary Prior, of Artarmon, New South Wales. For services to the arts and charity.
- William Ernest Roe, of Darwin, Northern Territory. For service to Australian rules football.
- William Henry Desborough Rogers, of Westmead, New South Wales. For service to youth, the aged and under privileged.
- Beryl Simpson, of Cessnock, New South Wales. For service to children.
- Mary Cecelia Stevenson, of Devonport, Tasmania. For service to women, the aged and the community.
- Charles Edward Stuart, of Windsor, Victoria. For service to veterans, especially ex-prisoners of war and dependants.
- Robert Henry Suitor, of Deakin, Australian Capital Territory. For public service as a gardener.
- Barbara Rose Temby, of East Ivanhoe, Victoria. For service to youth, the handicapped and community.
- Mary Ann Phoebe Veal, of Prahran, Victoria. For service to the aged.
- Maria Rosalia Gertrude Wiener, of Nedlands, Western Australia. For service to migrants.
- Stanley Thomas Williams, of Wukroonga, New South Wales. For service to hospital administration.

=== Royal Red Cross (RRC) ===
- Colonel Nellie Jane Espie (F64), Royal Australian Army Nursing Corps.

==== Associate of the Royal Red Cross (ARRC) ====
- Major Beryl Mary Elizabeth Hogarth (F35055), Royal Australian Army Nursing Corps.
- Major Betty Vera McNabb (F35066), Royal Australian Army Nursing Corps.
- Squadron Leader Jean Margaret Harrison (N58357), Royal Australian Air Force Nursing Service.

=== Air Force Cross (AFC) ===
Australian Army Aviation Corps

- Lieutenant Ian Sterling Hendrick (57251).
- Lieutenant (Temporary Captain) Robert Edward Walford (314207).

Royal Australian Air Force

- Flight Lieutenant Philip Charles Astley (057227).
- Squadron Leader Ronald Leith Biddell (043796).
- Squadron Leader Richard Brooke Gregory (018813).
- Squadron Leader David John Leach (0316292).
- Squadron Leader James Arthur Thompson Lowe (0316851).
- Flight Lieutenant Paul Victor Page (0225699).

=== Air Force Medal (AFM) ===
Royal Australian Air Force

- Sergeant Peter Laurie Watson (A57911).

=== Queen's Commendation for Valuable Service in the Air ===
Royal Australian Air Force

- Squadron Leader Geoffrey Leonard Colman (0221633).
- Sergeant Raymond George Morrison (AS7741).
- Squadron Leader Barry Maxwell Schulz (044090).

=== Queen's Police Medal (CPM) ===
- Frank Leslie Edney, Senior Inspector, Commonwealth Police Force.
- Edmund Hector George, Inspector, Commonwealth Police Force.
- Allan Frederick Cyril Metcalfe, Superintendent, Northern Territory Police Force.

== Mauritius ==
=== Knight Bachelor ===
- Joseph Michel Emile Series. For services in the field of agriculture and industrial development.

=== Order of Saint Michael and Saint George ===
==== Knight Grand Cross of the Order of St Michael and St George (GCMG) ====
- Doctor The Right Honourable Sir Seewoosagur Ramgoolam, MLA, Prime Minister of Mauritius.

==== Companion of the Order of St Michael and St George (CMG) ====
- Ramkwar Gopaul, Chairman, Public and Police Service Commissions.

=== Order of the British Empire ===
==== Officer of the Order of the British Empire (OBE) ====
Civil Division

- Bheewah Mahadoo. For services to the co-operative movement and for voluntary social work.
- Marie Marcel Arthur Nayna, lately Controller, Government Fire Services.
- Ernest Melchior Pierre Rouillard. For services to agriculture.
- Bhimsen Ramgutty Seebundhun. For services to local government and voluntary social work.
- Laichand Soowamber, Postmaster-General.

==== Member of the Order of the British Empire (MBE) ====
Civil Division

- Malleck Hajee Carrim Ahmed. For services in the field of labour and industrial relations.
- Moteelall Beedasy, Senior Supervisor (Hindi), Ministry of Education and Cultural Affairs.

=== Mauritius Police Medal ===
Mauritius Police Force

- Joseph Yves Emmanuel Hebrard, Superintendent.
- Benyduth Ramjeawon, Inspector.
- Jean Marc Herve Seneque, Superintendent.

== Fiji ==
=== Order of the British Empire ===
==== Commander of the Order of the British Empire (CBE) ====
Civil Division

- Tamesar Bhim, Auditor-General.

==== Officer of the Order of the British Empire (OBE) ====
Civil Division

- Adi Losalini Raravuya Dovi. For services to the community.
- George Ratcliffe Hemming, MBE. For services to the community, particularly in the field of medicine.

==== Member of the Order of the British Empire (MBE) ====
Civil Division

- Ram Sami Gounder. For services to the community.
- Ratu Kitione Malumulevu Kubuabola. For services to the community.
- Udit Narayan. For services to the community.
- Eparama Ulutegu Tarovia. For services to the community.

=== British Empire Medal (BEM) ===
Civil Division

- Samuela Vavitamana Waqairatu. For public service.

== Bahamas ==
=== Order of the British Empire ===
==== Commander of the Order of the British Empire (CBE) ====
- Hanford William Darville, Chairman of Public Service Commission.

==== Officer of the Order of the British Empire (OBE) ====
Civil Division

- Gerald Augustus Bartlett, CPM, Deputy Commissioner, Royal Bahamas Police Force.

==== Member of the Order of the British Empire (MBE) ====
Civil Division

- Everette Wakefield Evans, Sr. For services to the community.
- John Edward Johnson. For services to the community.
- The Reverend John Reece; Jr. For services to the church and community.

=== British Empire Medal (BEM) ===
Civil Division

- Ena Bailey. For services to education.
- Mae Valentine Clarke. For services to the post office.
- Lily Maycock. For services to the community.
- Freda Emma Anna Poitier. For services to education.

=== Queen's Police Medal (QPM) ===
For Distinguished Service

- Paul Rupert Thompson, CPM, Assistant Commissioner, Royal Bahamas Police Force.

== Grenada ==
=== Order of the British Empire ===
==== Officer of the Order of the British Empire (OBE) ====
Civil Division

- Hugh Dillon Baptiste. For services to education.

==== Member of the Order of the British Empire (MBE) ====
Civil Division

- Dorothy Irene Ogilvie. For services to nursing.
- Alice Beatrice Myra Salhab. For public service.

=== British Empire Medal (BEM) ===
Civil Division

- Mary Rose Valjean Charles. For services to the community.
- Randolph Thomas Armstrong Forrester. For services to the community.
- Veronica Louisa Mark. For services to the community.

=== Queen's Police Medal ===
- Leroy Cadore, Acting Inspector, Grenada Police Force.

== Papua New Guinea ==
=== Order of the Companions of Honour (CH) ===
- The Right Honourable Michael Thomas Somare, MP, Prime Minister of Papua New Guinea.

=== Order of Saint Michael and Saint George ===
==== Companion of the Order of St Michael and St George (CMG) ====
- The Honourable Kingsford Dibela, MP, Speaker of the National Parliament.

=== Order of the British Empire ===
==== Commander of the Order of the British Empire (CBE) ====
Civil Division

- The Honourable Bruce Reginald Jephcott, MP. Minister for Transport and Civil Aviation.

==== Officer of the Order of the British Empire (OBE) ====
Civil Division

- The Right Reverend George Ambo, Anglican Bishop of Popondetta.
- Jack Koavea Karukuru, lately Secretary, Department of Provincial Affairs.
- Samuel Piniau. For services to broadcasting and sport.

==== Member of the Order of the British Empire (MBE) ====
Military Division

- Lieutenant Commander David Joseph Angus (01822), Royal Australian Navy, Papua New Guinea Defence Force.
- Warrant Officer Class 2 Matthew Boidarua-Bwaragun (81615), Papua New Guinea Defence Force.
- Warrant Officer Class 2 John Joseph Carr (53873), Papua New Guinea Defence Force.

Civil Division

- Lillie Bryant Calvert. For services to medicine and the community.
- Andrew Dambui, Assistant Commissioner, Corrective Institutions.
- Martin Pius Sinavih, office of the Prime Minister.
- Dawa Lynch, lately Member, Public Services Commission.
- Muriso Warebu. For services to the community.

=== British Empire Medal (BEM) ===
Civil Division

- Kerelavi Augwi, lately Sub-Inspector, Royal Papua New Guinea Constabulary.
- Wakone Kembaran. For services as a government interpreter.
- Kumahuria, Sergeant, Royal Papua New Guinea Constabulary.
- Nusai Mamoang, Chief Assistant Correctional Officer.
- Mondiei, Senior Constable, Royal Papua New Guinea Constabulary.
- Grace Pokana. For services to politics and the community.
- Wango Yambali. For services to the community.
- Kambao Yoweh, Senior Assistant Correctional Officer.

=== Queen's Police Medal (QPM) ===
- Peter Rendell Giddings, Superintendent, Royal Papua New Guinea Constabulary.
- Norbert Maiap, Chief Superintendent, Royal Papua New Guinea Constabulary.

=== Queen's Commendation for Valuable Service in the Air ===
- Captain David Donald Ian Campbell. For services to civil aviation.
- Captain George Argyle Glassey. For services to civil aviation.
