= Byron Seaman =

Canadian businessman (1923–2021)

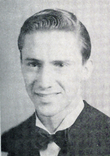
- Seaman in 1945 at the University of Saskatchewan
- Born: Byron James Seaman; September 7, 1923; Rouleau, Saskatchewan, Canada
- Died: April 24, 2021 (aged 97); Calgary, Alberta, Canada
- Education: BSc Mechanical Engineering
- Alma mater: University of Saskatchewan
- Occupation: Businessman
- Known for: Part-owner of the Calgary Flames

Byron James Seaman (September 7, 1923 – April 24, 2021) was a Canadian businessman. He was the co-owner of the Calgary Flames of the National Hockey League (NHL) for three decades from 1980 until 2010.

== Early life ==
Seaman was born in Rouleau, Saskatchewan, on September 7, 1923. He was one of four children of Byron Luther Seaman and Mae Patton, who were both born and raised in the United States. He attended the University of Saskatchewan and earned a Bachelor of Science degree in mechanical engineering in 1945.

== Career ==
Seaman moved to Alberta shortly after graduating to work in the oil industry with his two brothers, Donald and Daryl Seaman. They first established Seaman Engineering and Drilling Co. Ltd. (shortened to Sedco). It became noted for providing the option of turnkey contracts at a fixed price, rather than bidding a price for every foot drilled. The company also covered a portion of the drilling costs to secure the contract, as well as for services like cementing and casing. Sedco ultimately merged with three other companies in June 1962 to form Bow Valley Industries. Seaman went on to serve as CEO of Bow Valley (later Bovar, Inc) from 1976 to 1987, and as chairman from 1987 to 1990.

Seaman was one of the original six owners of the Calgary Flames, along with his brother Daryl, Harley Hotchkiss, Norman Kwong, Norman Green, and Ralph Thomas Scurfield. Under his co-ownership, the franchise won their only Stanley Cup in 1989. They reached two other Stanley Cup Final series in 1986 and 2004, losing to the Tampa Bay Lightning in seven games in the latter. Seaman remained a part-owner of the Flames until 2010, one year after his brother Daryl died.

Along with his brother and Hotchkiss, Seaman was inducted into the Alberta Sports Hall of Fame in 2007. He was also conferred the Governor General's medal.

== Personal life ==
Seaman was married to Evelyn until she died in 2003 from cancer and Parkinson's disease. Together, they had four children. Seaman died on April 24, 2021, at the age of 97.
