= Siebens =

Siebens is a surname. Notable people with the surname include:

- Adalberto Siebens (born 1946), Puerto Rican boxer
- Bill Siebens, Canadian oilman
- Evann Siebens, Canadian artist

== See also ==
- Siebens Building, a skyscraper in Rochester, Minnesota, United States
- Sieben (disambiguation)
