= Joudrey =

Joudrey (also Joudry or Joudrie) is a surname of French origin, common in Atlantic Canada. Notable people with the surname include:

- Andrew Joudrey (born 1984), Canadian ice hockey player
- Earl Joudrie (1934–2006), Canadian businessman
- Patricia Joudry (1921–2000), Canadian writer
- Shalan Joudry (born 1979), Canadian writer

== See also ==
- Vieilles-Maisons-sur-Joudry, commune in France
