= Carma Developers =

Canadian residential land developer

Carma Developers, founded in 1958, is a Canadian residential land developer with master-planned communities throughout Canada and the United States. Its head offices are located in Calgary, Alberta, where it is the largest residential land developer in that city.

On March 31, 2011, Brookfield Residential Properties Inc. (NYSE, TSX: BRP) announced the completion of a merger that combines Brookfield Homes Corporation with the residential group of Brookfield Office Properties consisting of Carma Developers and Brookfield Homes (Ontario) Limited.

== History ==
The company was founded in 1958 by a group of 45 Calgary-based home builders including Tony Usselman, Albert Bennett, Ralph Scurfield, Howard Ross, and Roy Wilson who got together to purchase bulk quantities of land to be used for housing developments in the booming young city of Calgary. Usselman and Bennett were the largest initial shareholders with each holding 20%.

In the 50 following years the company built close to 60 communities in Calgary, the first being the community of Rosemont where houses sold for between $18,000 and $22,000. The company grew rapidly during the economic boom of the 1960s and 1970s, using the funds from sales to buy other pieces of land, soon expanding past Calgary, and into the United States as well.

In 1970 Usselman sold his shares to Nu-West "with the stipulation that Nu-West would never take complete control of the builder/shareholder relationship." Other builders, too, sold or re-distributed their shares, and in 1972, when Carma went public, the company had developed and sold more than 11,000 residential lots and developed 500 acres (200 hectares) of serviced land for multi-family or commercial development.

By 1979, 75% of the company's shares were owned by Carma members, including Nu-West, which owned 48 per cent of the shares. In 1980, Carma bought Allarco Developments, a huge publicly traded holding company controlled by Edmonton surgeon Dr. Charles Allard, and Carma instantly became a billion dollar company, active in everything from petrochemicals and investments to auto sales.

Things began to get tough in the early 1980s when the Canadian federal government brought in the National Energy Program (NEP), which didn't allow Albertans to sell oil to the Canadian market at world prices. This policy decimated Alberta's Petroleum industry. People left Alberta in droves and almost no one bought homes, with existing owners walking away from mortgages. Real estate prices plummeted and the industry collapsed. Carma had 500 employees in 1983, declining to just 17 by 1985.

Carma was able to negotiate with the banks to keep certain assets to get rid of debt. They downsized, recapitalized, and under the direction of Murray Fox, who was hired in 1983 as chief financial officer, the company got back to the business of developing residential land.

By 1987, Brookfield Properties, headquartered in New York City, bought into the company. Today Brookfield owns 100% of it. Carma bought Nu-West's Canadian operations in 1989.

== Bibliography ==
- Max Foran, Expansive Discourses: Urban Sprawl in Calgary, 1945-1978 (2008) ISBN 1-897425-13-9
- Susan Goldenberg, Men of Property: The Canadian Developers who are Buying America (1981) ISBN 0-920510-46-9
- Marie Morgan, From the Ground Up: A History of Carma Developers (1998)
