= OH Ranch =

Historic ranch in Alberta, Canada

Coordinates: 50.5660°N 114.3519°W

The OH Ranch, OH Ranch Heritage Rangelands, Orville Hawkins Ranch or Rio Alto Ranch is a historic ranch founded in 1883 and is located near Longview, Alberta. The ranch actually consists of two separate parcels of land and also of the OH Pekisko, OH Longview, OH Dorothy, and OH Bassano ranches. Both parcels of land include both private and public land with the public land leased to OH Ranch Ltd. (the corporation that manages the ranch) for grazing. The approximate coordinates of the southern section of the ranch are 50.565065, -114.354775.

== History ==
The ranch's origins date back to 1881 when a man named Orville Hawkins Smith, a mule skinner, and Lafayette French, a buffalo hunter, began to raise cattle illegally around the Highwood River. They registered the OH brand in 1883, to this day one of the oldest brands in Western Canada. The name OH is a reference to Smith's first two initials.

In 1883 Frederick Ings, from Charlottetown bought Smith and French's 300 cattle and began his own ranch. Later that year his brother, James Walter, came to the OH and together they named the ranch "Rio Alto" or High River in Spanish.

The North-West Mounted Police also create a station on the ranch that was in operation until 1900. The original cabin burned in 1961 but a re-creation was built.

The brothers later parted ways as Walter Ings bought Fred's interest. Fred then sold the ranch, cattle, and brand to Patrick Burns, a famous cowboy. However, Burns sold the property to a shipping company Mayer & Lage, although he eventually bought it back later. When Burns died his estate liquidated his assets, including the ranch in 1950. Then due to its size the original plan was to sell the ranch in pieces, but C. W. (Kink) Roenish and Bill Ardern intervened and jointly bought the ranch. They hence changed the name of the ranch to the OH Ranch Ltd. The same year Bert Sheppard was hired to manage the ranch and in 1957 along with Bill Ardern's son-in-law (A.D. (Doug) Kingsford) became full partners.

The ranch was yet again put up for sale in 1986. The Department of National Defence was planning to buy and use the ranch for an artillery range and training ground. The ranch was saved once again but this time by Daryl "Doc" Seaman.

In 2008 certain parts of the ranch, which were originally grazing leases, were set aside as provincial Heritage Rangelands, known as the OH Ranch Heritage Rangelands.

In 2009 the private land was put under regulations for conservation easement. Following Seaman's death in 2009 the ranch was put on the market and bought by Bill Siebens in 2011.

On June 19, 2012, the southern portion of the ranch was donated to the Calgary Stampede Foundation. The gift was valued at more than $11 million and is the largest gift ever received by the foundation. Since then, the ranch has been used for field trip opportunities for elementary school students.

== Herd ==
Since the southern part of the ranch was given to the Stampede Foundation they introduced 200 new cattle in the spring of 2013.
