= Earl Joudrie =

Canadian businessman (1934–2006)

- Born: 27 March 1934; Edmonton, Alberta
- Died: 29 November 2006 (aged 72); Fenelon Falls, Ontario
- Education: University of Alberta (BA '56)
- Spouse(s): Dorothy Day Jonason (m. 1957) Lynne Manning (m. 1996)

Herbert Earl Joudrie (27 March 1934 – 29 November 2006) was a Canadian businessman who served as chairman of Algoma Steel, Gulf Canada, and Canadian Tire. Joudrie began his career in 1957 with Pacific Petroleums, and in 1959 moved to Calgary to join the United Producing Company. In 1970 he was appointed president of Ashland Oil Canada, which had taken over United, and in 1974 was elected chairman. In 1977 he moved to Kentucky to become vice-president of the parent company, Ashland Oil. Joudrie returned to Calgary in 1979 to become president of Voyager Petroleums, the oil and gas arm of Nu-West. He left the company in 1985 to join Dome Petroleum as president of its subsidiary Dome Canada, which in 1986 was renamed Encor Energy. By the 1990s, Joudie had become a major figure in Canadian business. He received the chairmanships of Algoma Steel in 1991, Gulf Canada in 1993, and Canadian Tire in 1994.

On 21 January 1995, after meeting at her home in Calgary to discuss their divorce, Joudrie's wife Dorothy shot him seven times. Joudrie survived the shooting, and the case became a national sensation. In May 1996, Dorothy was found not criminally responsible on the grounds of automatism and served five months in a mental institution. Following the verdict, Joudrie relinquished the chairmanship of Canadian Tire, but remained chairman of Gulf Canada through 2001 and Algoma through 2002. He retired as a director of Canadian Tire in 2005. Joudrie died on 29 November 2006 at age 72.

== Biography ==
=== Early life and family, 1934–1957 ===
Herbert Earl Joudrie was born on 27 March 1934 in Edmonton to Herbert Norman "Herb" Joudrie (1900–1992) and Doris Shimek (1907–1981). The Joudries originated in Doubs, and descended from Jacques Urbain Joudrey (1723–1784), who had come to Nova Scotia in the mid-18th century. Herb was born in Nova Scotia and came to Saskatchewan to farm. In 1922 he married Mabel Margaret Wright (1900–1931), with whom he had two daughters, Norma and Lillian. After Mabel's death from pneumonia in 1931, Herb left his two daughters with their grandparents and moved to Edmonton to try to find work. In 1934, he remarried to Doris, with whom he had Earl in 1934 and later a second son, Keith Bryant Joudrie (1937–2011).

Doris, who was a school teacher, made Earl learn violin and Keith learn piano. Herb was a strict disciplinarian, and after Earl missed curfew one night, the latter decided to leave home. Aged 14, Earl moved in with friends in his South Edmonton neighbourhood. Earl attended Westglen High School. At Westglen, Earl, age 16, met Dorothy Day Jonason (1935–2002), who was a year younger than him, and began dating. After graduation in 1952, Joudrie entered the University of Alberta, where he studied history and economics. Dorothy followed him to the university and studied English and home economics. During university, Earl played violin with the Edmonton Symphony to make extra money and worked in mines and oil fields in Northern Alberta in the summers. Earl graduated in May 1956, and Dorothy graduated the following year. Earl entered law school at the University of Alberta in the fall of 1956 but dropped out after the first term and joined Pacific Petroleums as a landman in Fort St. John in early 1957.

=== Marriage and Ashland, 1957–1979 ===
On Christmas Eve 1954, Earl and Dorothy were engaged. The wedding took place on 17 August 1957 at Metropolitan United Church in Edmonton. After the wedding, the couple settled in Fort St. John. In 1959, the Joudries moved to Calgary where Earl took a job with the United Producing Company and Dorothy taught English at Viscount Bennett High School. After failed attempts to have children, in 1961 they adopted a son, Neale, at birth. In 1963, Dorothy gave birth to a daughter, Carolyn, and they had sons Colin in 1968 and Guy in 1970.

At some point in the 1960s, United Producers was acquired by Ashland Oil. Subsequently, Joudrie became Canadian divisional manager for Ashland, and president of Canadian Ashland Exploration Limited. Further, Joudrie was elected a director of Canadian Gridoil Limited, which was controlled by Calgary's Nickle family. In Calgary, the Joudries were active community members. In 1966 Earl was elected president of the local branch of the Canadian Mental Health Association, while Dorothy was treasurer of the University Women's Club of Calgary. In 1968, the Joudries built a house at 6907 Lamont Court in Lakeview Village.

On 4 September 1970, Ashland merged all its Canadian properties, including Canadian Gridoil, into a new company called Ashland Oil Canada Limited. Upon the formation of Ashland Canada, Joudrie was appointed president, and Samuel Clarence Nickle Sr. was elected chairman. In 1971, Joudrie was diagnosed with Hodgkin lymphoma and given six months to live. He underwent an aggressive experimental treatment at the Stanford University Medical Center with two other patients, both of whom died. After he returned to health, he moved his family, as well as the Ashland Canada executive offices, to Toronto. There, the Joudries lived at 12 Royal Oak Drive in North York. In November 1974, Joudrie was elected chairman, succeeding Arloe W. Mayne, who had taken the post after Nickle's death in 1971. Joudie was succeeded as president by Vernon Van Sant Jr.

In early 1977, Joudrie accepted of senior vice-president and group operating officer of the parent company, and as such, moved his family to Ashland, Kentucky. While with Ashland, the Joudrie's lived in the exclusive Bellefonte neighbourhood. He remained chairman of Ashland Canada, and the executive offices of the Canadian arm returned to Calgary from Toronto.

=== Nu-West and Dome Canada, 1979–1989 ===
In February 1979, following the acquisition of Ashland Canada by Kaiser Resources of Vancouver, Joudrie left Ashland and returned to Calgary to become president of Voyager Petroleums Limited, which was controlled by Nu-West. Joudrie succeeded Sydney Kahanoff, who became chairman. In December 1981, Joudrie succeeded Ralph Scurfield as president of Nu-West, while Scurfield became chairman. In August 1982, he was elected to the board of Canadian Utilities Limited. In July 1984, the struggling Nu-West sold the assets of Voyager Petroleums to Freeport-McMoran Inc. of New York and Transco Energy Co. of Houston.

In December 1984, Joudrie was elected a director of Dome Canada Limited. Dome Canada had been formed in 1981 as a Canadian operating subsidiary of Dome Petroleum in the wake of the National Energy Program. In March 1985, Dome Canada announced that Joudrie would assume the presidency on 1 April, succeeding J. Louis Lebel. Joudrie left Nu-West on 31 March, though he remained a director. In May 1986, Dome Canada changed its name to Encor Energy Corp. In December 1987, Encor was acquired by TransCanada Pipelines. Following the takeover, Joudrie became head of TransCanada's oil and gas resources, but left the company in 1988. That September, he was elected chairman of the Public Policy Forum.

Meanwhile, Earl and Dorothy's marriage had deteriorated. In October 1989, Earl separated from her.

=== Corporate titan, 1990–1995 ===
At the start of the 1990s, Joudrie's career reached its pinnacle. In February 1990, Joudrie became chairman and chief executive officer of American Eagle Petroleums. In August 1990, he was elected a director of Canadian Tire. On 31 July 1991, Algoma Steel elected Joudrie its new chairman. That same day, Joudrie resigned as president of American Eagle Petroleums. Joudrie was brought in to save the insolvent steel manufacturer and to restructure its $800 million of debt. In an interview following the appointment, Joudrie said, "there will be a plan of some kind. Because of the situation in Sault Ste. Marie it is important for the community and the government and everyone else. Anything that starts to look like shutting down Algoma or throwing it into bankruptcy is not tolerable." In February 1993, Joudrie was elected to the board of Gulf Canada, and that July, he was elected chairman of the board. In February 1994, Canadian Tire announced that at its annual meeting in May, Hugh Leopold Macaulay would step down as chairman, and that it intended to elect Joudrie as his replacement. Joudrie was now chairman of three of Canada's most prominent corporations. By the spring of 1994, Joudrie had turned the formerly bankrupt Algoma into one of the country's greatest business success stories.

=== Attempted murder and trial, 1995–1996 ===
In the early 1990s, Joudrie had appointed Lynne Manning to the board of the Public Policy Forum. Manning, who was from Edmonton and was the daughter of a cousin of Dorothy's, had three teenage daughters and in 1987 had divorced her husband. That year, she moved to Toronto, where she became district manager for Kelly Services. Joudrie and Manning became involved romantically, and in 1993 began living together.

In April 1993, Earl initiated divorce proceedings with Dorothy. However, she persuaded him to wait until after the wedding in December 1994 of their son Guy, who was the last of their children to marry. The following January, Dorothy invited Earl to her condominium to hand over the deed of their 7,000 square-foot home in Bearspaw. On the morning of 21 January 1995, Joudrie went to Dorothy's house at 143 Country Club Lane on the Bearspaw Golf Club in northwest Calgary. The couple had coffee together and discussed the divorce. As Joudrie left the house through the garage, Dorothy pulled out a .25-calibre Beretta and shot him in the back. After Joudrie had fallen to the floor, Dorothy fired another six shots. Dorothy returned the gun to a drawer in the house, then phoned 911 for help. The police arrived shortly after 10 am and arrested Dorothy, while Earl was flown to the Calgary General Hospital for care. Later, Dr Joyce Wong testified that Joudrie had been hit four times in the back and three times in the leg, and had suffered a broken arm and collapsed lung. Dorothy was released on bail two days later.

On 22 April 1996, the trial began in Calgary. Testimony revealed a turbulent marriage that had included violence on Earl's part and alcoholism on Dorothy's. Earl was revealed to have hit Dorothy at least three times, the last time having been in 1978. Meanwhile, the Joudrie children testified that their mother had been an alcoholic and was often violent towards them.

Dorothy's lawyer, Noel C. O'Brien, argued that she was suffering from automatism, a robotic, disassociated state where she was unaware of her actions. On 7 May, the jury of 11 women and one man began its deliberations. On 9 May, the jury concluded that "we find the accused committed these acts, but that she is not criminally responsible by reason of mental disorder." Subsequently, Dorothy was committed to a mental hospital in Edmonton, until she was released that October.

In 1999, Audrey Andrews published Be Good, Sweet Maid: The Trials of Dorothy Joudrie, a feminist interpretation of Dorothy's life.

=== Later life, 1996–2006 ===
After his recovery and during the subsequent trial, Joudrie had remained active in business. In July 1995, he was named to the board of Unitel Communications, and in February 1996 was elected chairman. The day after the verdict was delivered in May 1996, Joudrie relinquished the chairmanship of Canadian Tire, and requested a leave from the board until 30 June, at which time he would decide whether to remain a director. At the annual meeting of Canadian Utilities on 17 May, Joudrie announced that he would remain on the boards of CU and Canadian Tire. In July 1996, Joudrie married Manning at a private ceremony in Toronto. At the time, he was 62 and she 54.

In the fall of 1996, Joudrie left Unitel. Joudrie remained chairman of Gulf Canada until its sale to Conoco in July 2001. In January 2002, following its emergence from bankruptcy protection, the Algoma board was dissolved, thus ending Joudrie's chairmanship. Joudrie remained on the board of Canadian Tire until the 2005 annual meeting.

Dorothy died in Calgary in February 2002, age 66, from liver and kidney failure.

In 2000, Joudrie was diagnosed with Parkinson's disease, and in 2006 with Non-Hodgkin lymphoma. He underwent a course of chemotherapy which appeared successful initially, but later the cancer was found to have spread. Joudrie died in Fenelon Falls on 29 November 2006 at the age of 72.
