= Marsha Kennedy =

Canadian artist (b. 1951)

- Born: 1951 (age 74–75); Regina, Saskatchewan
- Education: University of Regina (BFA); York University (MFA)
- Occupation: Artist
- Known for: Painting, drawing
- Website: www.marshakennedy.ca

Marsha Kennedy (born 1951) is a Canadian artist from Regina, Saskatchewan. She is known for her work in painting and drawing. Kennedy grew up in Rouleau, Saskatchewan and attended high school in Regina where she graduated from the Central Collegiate Fine Arts Program. She earned a Bachelor of Fine Arts at the University of Regina in 1977 and completed a Master of Fine Arts at York University in 1981. The themes of "Man vs Nature or Man as a part of nature" make up a reoccurring theme in Kennedy's paintings.

== Career ==
Kennedy has taught at Guelph University, Fanshawe College of Applied Arts and Science and the Art Gallery of Ontario. She began teaching drawing and painting at the University of Regina in 1991. Kennedy is known for her paintings that often depict the destructive relationship and "connections between humanity and nature". She has also published an art book entitled The Rapture of Flora.

In 2007, she worked on an educational video project titled Art InCLINEd with host Heather Cline. Kennedy is featured in a chapter of the video titled "The Scientific Gaze," in which she discusses the history of women painting as a form of scientific exploration.

In 2011 Kennedy took part in the "Artists by Artists" program at the Mendel Art Gallery in Saskatoon, which allowed her to work closely with sculptor Carole Epp.

== Exhibitions ==
Kennedy's artwork has been exhibited in a number of solo and group exhibitions throughout Canada including:

- Rosemont Art Gallery (1995)
- Art Gallery of Swift Current (1997)
- Mackenzie Art Gallery (1999)
- Medicine Hat Museum and Art Gallery (2001)
- Vernon Art Gallery (2006)
- "Birds, Nests, Water, Sky". Regina's Mysteria Gallery (2008)
- "Upon My Lap the World is at Play". Regina's Mysteria Gallery (2010)
