= West Seattle High School =

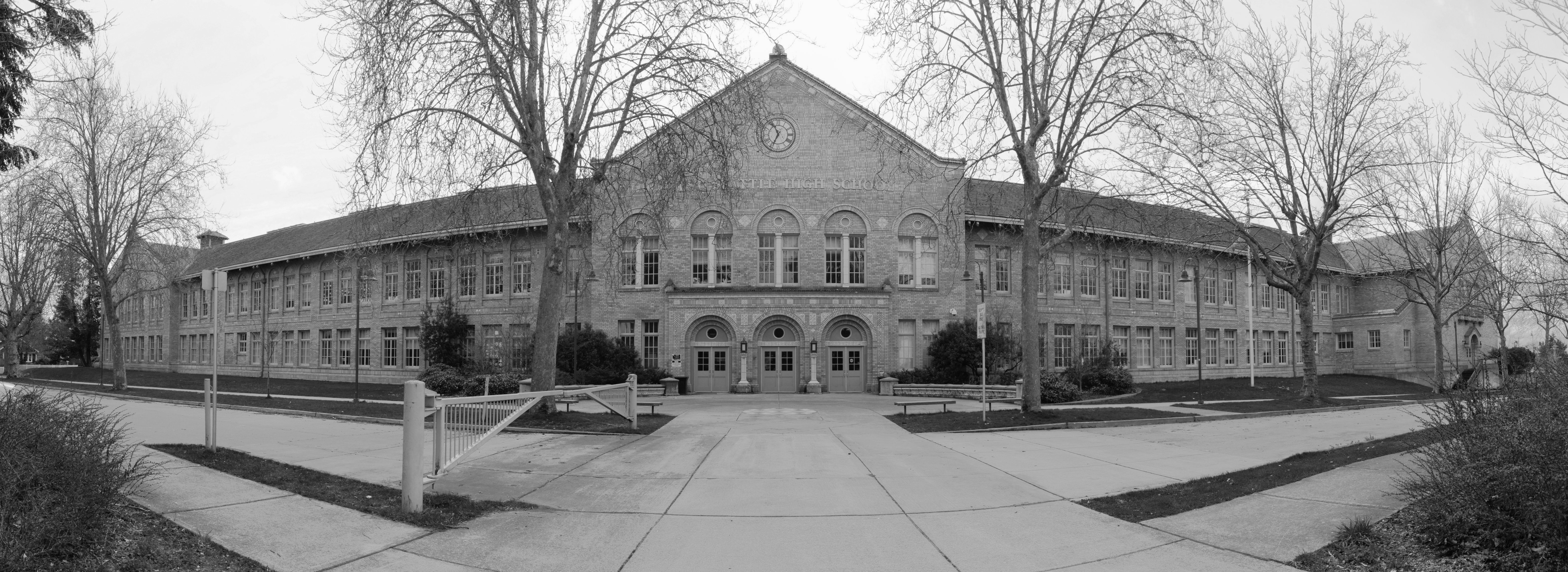
- West Seattle High School

Location
- 3000 California Ave SW; Seattle, Washington 98116; United States; 47°34′36″N 122°23′04″W

Information
- School type: Public, high school
- Established: 1917; 109 years ago
- School district: Seattle Public Schools
- NCES School ID: 530771001262
- Principal: Brian Vance
- Teaching staff: 60.80 (FTE) (2022–23)
- Grades: 9–12
- Enrollment: 1,329 (2022–23)
- Student to teacher ratio: 21.86:1 (2022–23)
- Colors: Navy blue; Gold
- Mascot: Wildcats
- Website: westseattlehs.seattleschools.org

Seattle Landmark

West Seattle High School (known to students as "Westside") is a comprehensive public high school in Seattle's West Seattle neighborhood that serves grades nine through twelve as part of the Seattle Public Schools.

== History and facilities ==
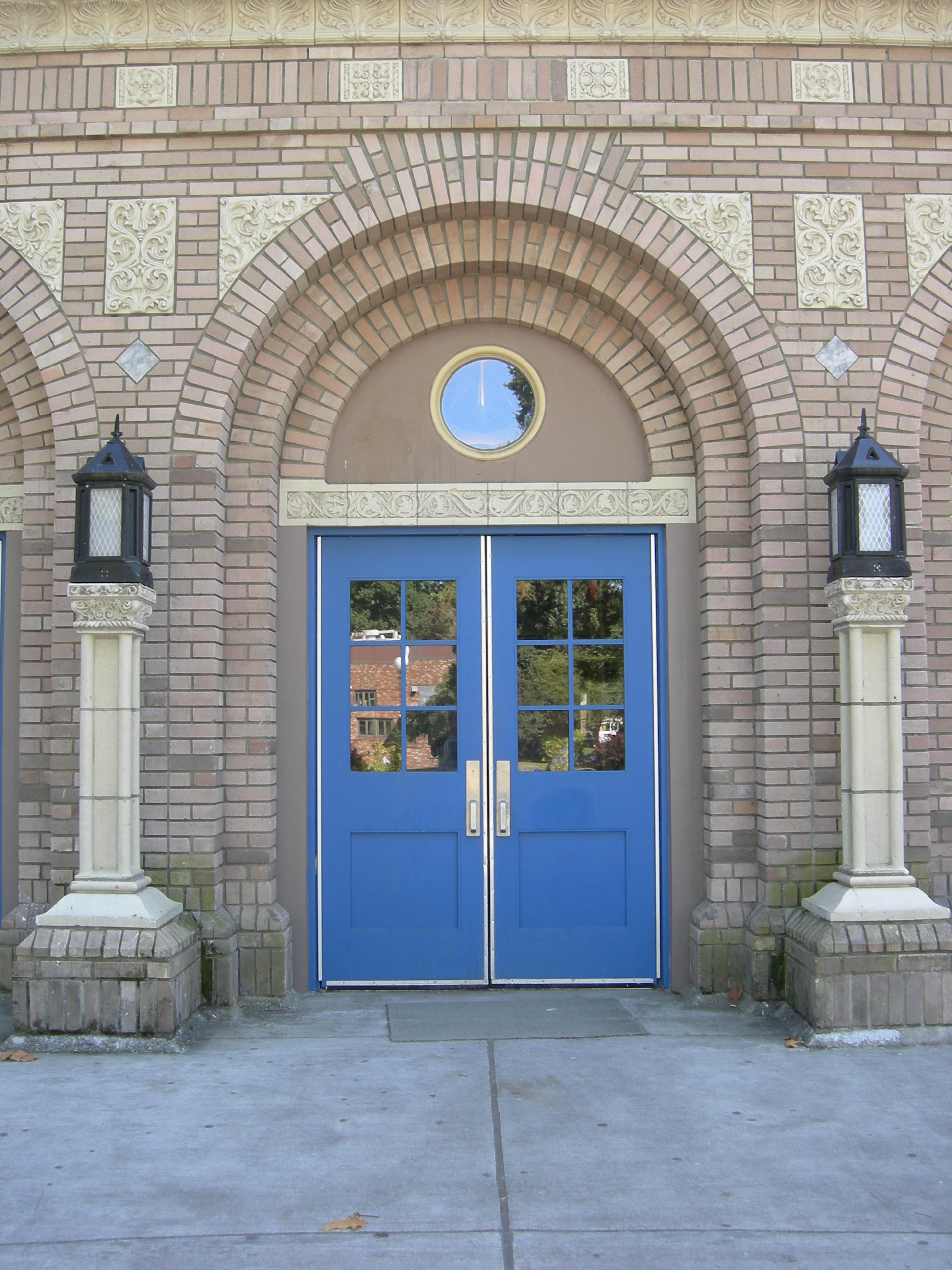
Historic Entry Door

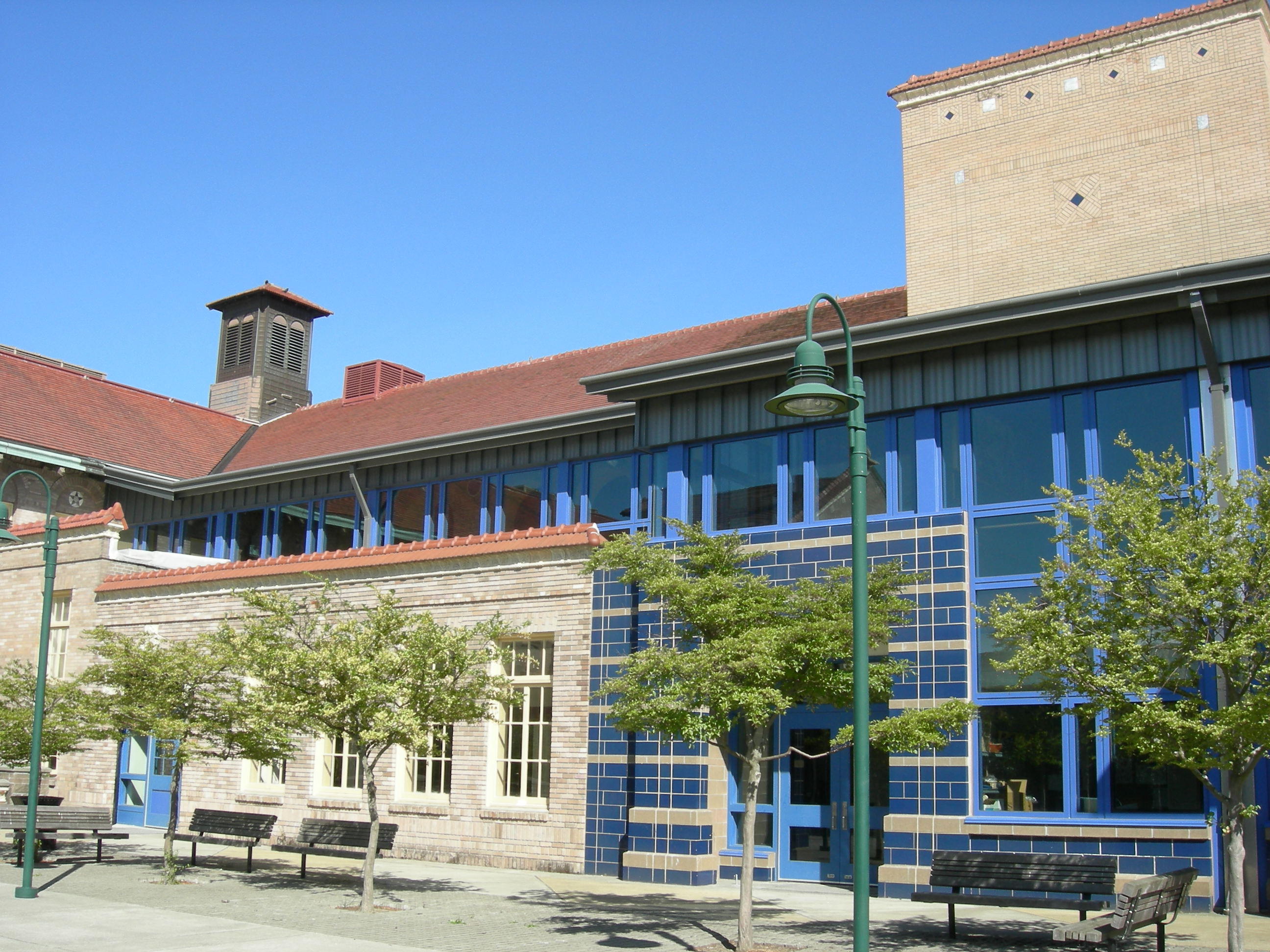
New Courtyard Entry

The school opened in 1902 and it was first called "West Seattle School." In 1917, the current building was opened and the school was renamed "West Seattle High School." The mascot was an Indian Chief, and the athletic teams were known as the Indians. A change in the nickname was considered several times beginning in 1974. The mascot was changed to a Wildcat in 2002.

The current neo-Renaissance building was designed by architect Edgar Blair on 3.5 acres. Various expansions of the site increased the property to its current 8.6 acres. Additions and renovation included the 1924 expansion by School District architect Floyd Naramore, a 1930 annex, a 1954 addition by architects Naramore Bains Brady Johansen, by Theo Damn in 1958, and major interior renovations in 1972. At various times portable classrooms had been installed on the site. The Seattle Landmarks Preservation Board designated the building a Landmark in 1981.

There was a major remodel in 2000-2002 by Bassetti Architects. This involved featuring the historic building while doubling the size of the facility. The addition was arranged to provide a new entrance to the school surrounded by a new gymnasium, theater, and Commons spaces. The main entrance was restored, the central auditorium was converted to the Commons, and the gym was converted into the library. Awards for this renovation included: 2001 Excellence in Masonry, Honorable Mention; 2004 AIA Washington Civic Design Awards, Merit Award; and 2004 Masonry Institute of Washington Merit Award - Rehab/Restoration.

== Athletics ==
West Seattle is a member of the 3A Metro League. The 2006 Senior Varsity Baseball Team was Metro League ChampionsMost recently the Wildcats had their 2022 Varsity Baseball team crowned Metro League Champion, but they lost out at state in the semi-finals to Mercer Island. The 2022 and 2024 Baseball teams won the 3A Metro Championship. The Baseball team has made it the state playoffs four years in a row and in 2024 they brought the 3A Washington State Championship trophy home to trophy case. The 2024 team had 13 seniors, 7 of those seniors went on to play in college. The 2004 and 2005 Varsity volleyball team were Metro League Champions. The 2004 Wrestling Team was the Metro League Champions. The 2007-08 Men's basketball team made it to the State championship playoffs for the first time in 38 years, losing the 1st round to Sqalicum. Again the Wildcats were the champions of the 2008-09 metro sound football season with a record of 9-2, the team made it to the second round of the state playoffs beating Enumclaw and then losing to Ferndale. The team graduated three Division 1 players.

== Notable alumni ==
- Ed Bahr, Former MLB player (Pittsburgh Pirates)
- Byron "By" Bailey, former NFL and Canadian Football League player; Canadian Football Hall of Fame member
- Fred Beckey (1941), Mountaineer, Naturalist and author
- Dyan Cannon (1954), actress
- Dow Constantine (1980), King County Executive
- Ayşenur Eygi, activist killed in the West Bank
- Frances Farmer (1931), actress
- Aaron Grymes (2009) former Canadian Football League player for the Edmonton Eskimos, Philadelphia Eagles and current football player for the BC Lions
- T. J. Lee (2009) Canadian Football League player for the BC Lions
- Ivar Haglund, founder of Ivar's
- Steven Hill (1940), actor
- Gregory C. Johnson (1972) NASA Astronaut, STS-125 Atlantis (May 11–24, 2009), the fifth and final Hubble servicing mission
- Rosanna Pansino (2003), actress and YouTube personality
- Mark Small, Former MLB player (Houston Astros)
- Maurice Smith, World Champion kickboxer and former MMA fighter
- Yvette Van Voorhees, squad member of inaugural 1976 Seahawks Dancers (Sea Gals at the time), Miss Washington World 1973, actress in Xanadu
- Jim Whittaker (1947), first American to climb Mount Everest
- Lou Whittaker (1947), mountaineer, founded Mount Rainier guide service
