= Howard Ross =

Howard Ross may refer to:

- Howard Ross (actor) (born 1941), Italian actor
- Howard Ross (baseball) (1903–1963), American baseball player
- Howard E. Ross (1921–2010), national president of the Canadian Home Builders' Association
- Howard Irwin Ross (1907–1974), chancellor of McGill University

== See also ==
- Henry H. Ross (Henry Howard Ross, 1790–1862), member of United States House of Representatives from New York
