= Daryl Seaman =

Canadian oilman (1922–2009)

- Born: 28 April 1922; Rouleau, Saskatchewan
- Died: 11 January 2009 (aged 86); Calgary, Alberta
- Education: University of Saskatchewan (BS 1948)
- Spouse: Lois Maureen DeLong (m. 1948)
- Military career
- Branch: Royal Canadian Air Force
- Service years: 1941–1945
- Rank: Flying Officer
- Unit: No. 500 Squadron RAF
- Conflicts: World War II

Daryl Kenneth "Doc" Seaman OC AOE (28 April 1922 – 11 January 2009) was a Canadian engineer, oilman, and hockey executive. Seaman was the founder, president, and chairman of Bow Valley Industries, one of Canada's largest independent petroleum companies. In addition to his business activities, from 1941 to 1945 he served as a pilot in the Royal Canadian Air Force and from 1980 to 2009 was a part-owner of the Calgary Flames.

== Biography ==
=== Early life ===
Daryl Kenneth Seaman was born on 28 April 1922 in Rouleau, Saskatchewan, to Byron Luther Seaman (1890–1979) and Letha Mae Patton (1899–2006). Daryl was the second of four children. He had an older sister Dorothy Verna, and younger brothers Byron James "B. J." and Donald Roy. Byron Seaman Sr was born in Wisconsin and had come to Canada during the First World War to help with the harvest. After the United States entered the War on 6 April 1917, he returned stateside, joined the army, and fought with the American Expeditionary Forces in Germany. Seaman returned to Canada in January 1920 and married that same month. Seaman had met Mae Patton in Avonlea, Saskatchewan. Patton was born in Unadilla, Nebraska in 1899 and moved to Canada with her family in 1912. Until 1928 both Byron and Mae worked on a farm. In 1928 Byron started a road construction company, which all of his sons worked for in the summer once they were old enough.

=== World War II ===
Seaman graduated high school in the spring of 1939, months before Canada entered World War II on 10 September 1939. That fall Seaman entered technical school in Moose Jaw and began playing hockey with the Moose Jaw Canucks. Shortly after starting school Seaman became ill and returned to Rouleau having dropped out. In the fall of 1940 Seaman began an engineering degree at the University of Saskatchewan, but in February 1941 left university after enlisting in the military. Because of his high marks in math and physics, the recruiter suggested that Seaman enlist in the Air Force. The first phase of Seaman's military training in the British Commonwealth Air Training Plan (BCATP) took place in Brandon, Manitoba, and following that he was transferred to Regina, Saskatchewan. Being selected as a pilot, he was then sent to RCAF Virden for flight instruction, and few for the first time in September 1941. That November he was transferred to RCAF Brandon and on 12 March 1942 was awarded his Wings.

Shortly after finishing his training, Seaman was sent to Halifax, Nova Scotia, where he spent his twentieth birthday. On 1 May 1942, Seaman set sail for Great Britain on the MS Batory and arrived in Glasgow on 12 May. Upon arrival he traveled to Bournemouth, where he spent a short time before transferring to Cornwall, back to Bournemouth, then to RAF Kirmington, and finally to RAF Harrogate. During this time Seaman underwent additional flight training in Airspeed Oxfords. By that fall Seaman's initial training was complete, and he was sent to RAF Silloth and assigned to a Lockheed Hudson as part of a four-man crew. From November 1942 to January 1943 the crew practised navigation and bombing, the final phase of training.

On 20 February 1943 the crew flew to RAF Portreath where they were given their first operation, which was to fly the plane to Gibraltar. Due to poor weather conditions though, Seaman was forced to fly to Casablanca, Morocco. After arrival in Africa, the crew was then posted to Blida, Algeria. While the crew was on a sortie on 29 March 1943, a German Messerschmitt Me 210 attacked their plane, killing one crew member and hitting Seaman twice in the leg. With the assistance of his two remaining crew members Seaman was able to remain conscious and fly the plane back to base. After surgery and a month-long recovery, Seaman returned to duty at the end of April. Between February 1943 and September 1944 Seaman's crew flew 82 sorties. On 23 September 1944 the crew returned to England and shortly thereafter Seaman returned to Canada aboard the Aquitaine, the same ship on which his father had returned to the United States after the First World War.

=== University and early career ===
Seaman returned to Saskatchewan but was not officially demobilized until August 1945. That fall, he began an engineering degree at the University of Saskatchewan. Taking classes during the summers as well, Seaman completed his degree in three years, graduating in the spring of 1948. During the summers of 1945 and 1946 Seaman also played baseball for a Saskatoon veterans' team. Carrying his equipment in a satchel, it was at this time he earned his nickname "Doc." Both of his brothers had also graduated with engineering degrees from the University of Saskatchewan – B. J. in 1945 and Don in 1947 – and started working in the oil industry after graduation. When Daryl graduated in 1948, he and B.J. traveled to Edmonton, hoping to find work in the wake of the Leduc No. 1 discovery that took place on 13 February 1947. Both B. J. and Daryl got jobs with seismic company Western Geophysical, working in the Athabasca River area. On 6 September 1948 in Vancouver, Seaman married Lois Maureen DeLong, whom he had met at university.

=== Sedco and Bow Valley ===
While working seismic, Seaman became interested in the prospect of forming his own business. Seaman found a partner in Bill Warnke, another war veteran working in the industry. Seaman and Warnke had half of the capital they required to purchase a new seismic rig, and were unable to get a loan from an Edmonton bank. Travelling to Calgary in the spring of 1949, Seaman acquired a loan from a small insurance company and ordered a Mayhew rig through Seismic Service Supply. It was at this time that he resigned from Western Geophysical. Seaman then flew to Dallas, where the rigs were built, waited a week for its completion, and then drove the rig back to Canada. Seaman and Warnke Drilling Contractors received their first contract shortly thereafter. Later in the year, B.J. joined the company, and a second rig was purchased with money given by their father. In 1950, Don, who had been working in Québec, also joined. Not long after the company was fully operational, the Seaman brothers bought out Warnke's share of the business and changed the company name to Seaman Engineering and Drilling Company, known as Sedco. Throughout the 1950s Sedco became one of Alberta's largest seismic companies. In 1959 Sedco arranged to purchase the larger Hi-Tower Drilling, a company that had been founded in 1945 by Ralph Will. In 1962 the company name was changed to Bow Valley Industries, which it would remain for the rest of its existence. At this time Seaman also purchased several other companies, and by 1964 Bow Valley became the second-largest drilling company in Canada.

Bow Valley's largest discovery came in early 1975 when they struck oil in the North Sea off the coast of Scotland. Wanting to expand internationally, Seaman had in April 1971 acquired Syracuse Oil Company, a British company run by Angus MacKenzie. Joining with two Norwegian companies Bow Valley constructed the semi-submersible it named the "Odin Drill." Bow Valley was third in line drilling in the region, and both previous companies' wells had come up dry. Beginning drilling in September 1974 and taking eight months, Bow Valley discovered a massive field which flowed 22,000 barrels a day. Named the "Brae Field," it remains one of the largest North Sea discoveries. Bow Valley Industries remained one of Canada's largest oil companies into the 1990s. In May 1994, Talisman Energy acquired Bow Valley for C$1.82 billion. Retaining rights to the company name, in 1996 Daryl, B. J., and Don, along with numerous other former Bow Valley employees, formed the new Bow Valley Energy, a mid-sized oil company.

=== Personal life ===
Seaman was a lifelong hockey enthusiast and in his youth had been asked to sign a protection card with the New York Americans. Later in life, Seaman was part of the group that purchased the Atlanta Flames in May 1980 and relocated the team to Calgary. The group was led by Nelson Skalbania and in addition to Daryl Seaman comprised B. J. Seaman, Harley Hotchkiss, Ralph Scurfield, Norman Green, and Normie Kwong. During's Seaman's time as an owner, the Flames played in three Stanley Cup Finals, losing in 1986 and 2004, and winning in 1989. At the time of Seaman's death in 2009, only he, Byron Seaman, and Harley Hotchkiss remained from the original ownership group. In addition to his ownership of the Flames, Seaman was instrumental in the construction of the Olympic Saddledome and in bringing the 1988 Winter Olympics to Calgary.

In 1987 Seaman purchased the historic OH Ranch and its cattle operation, which he owned until his death in 2009. The ranch had been founded in 1883 and is among the oldest operational ranches in the province. In 2011, the ranch was sold to Bill Siebens.

From 1949 on, Seaman lived with his wife Lois, who died in 1973 in Calgary. The couple had four children and spent their summers at a family ranch near Millarville, Alberta. On 11 January 2009 Seaman died at the age of 86, having had prostate cancer. Seaman contributed to numerous philanthropic endeavours, notably minor hockey. Upon his death he left $117 million to the City of Calgary, one of the largest donations in the country's history. In 1993 Seaman was made an Officer of the Order of Canada, and in 2010 was posthumously inducted into the Hockey Hall of Fame.
