= Keith Aulie =

Canadian ice hockey player (born 1989)

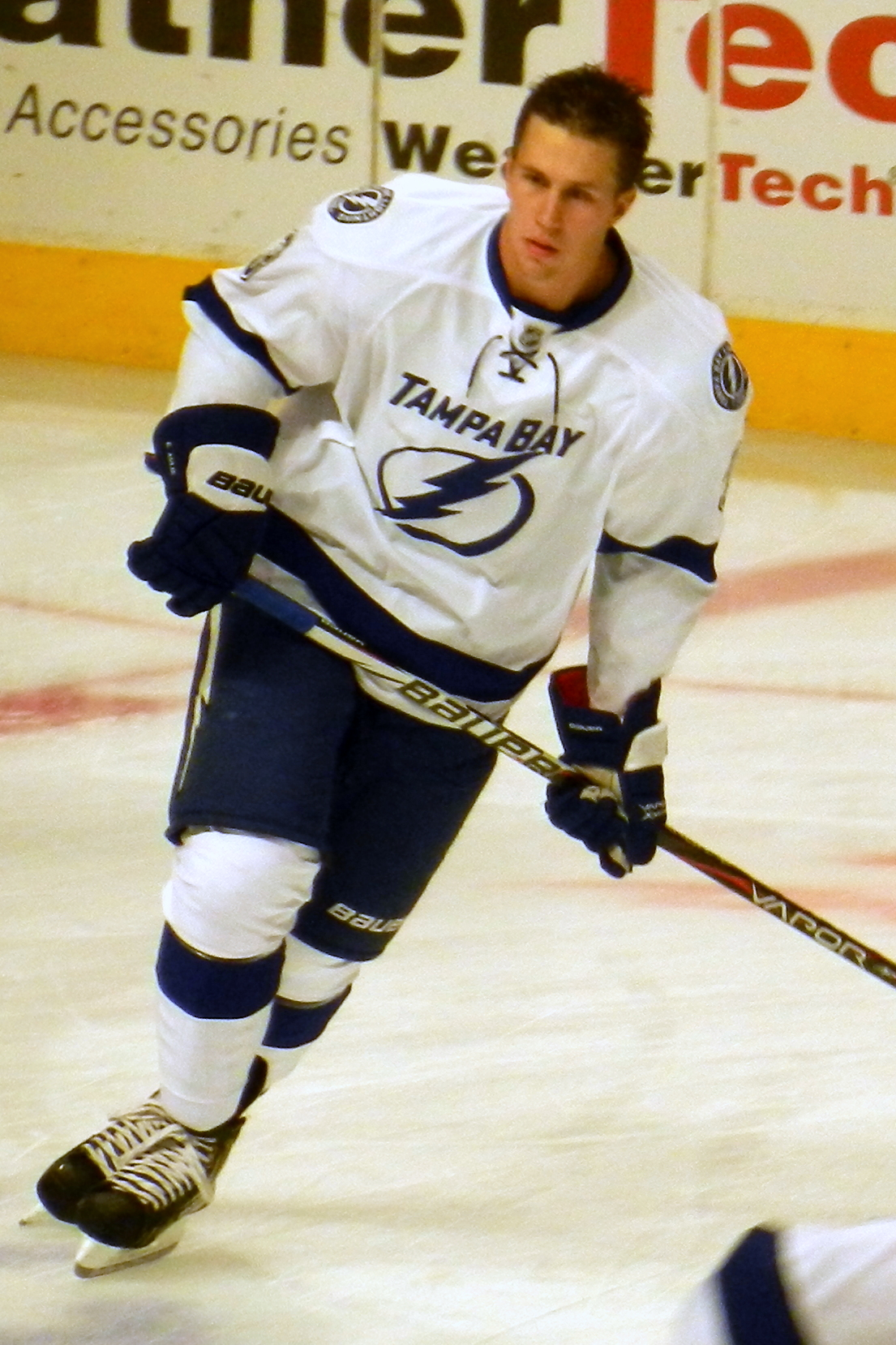
- Aulie with the Tampa Bay Lightning
- Born: June 11, 1989 (age 37) Rouleau, Saskatchewan, Canada
- Height: 6 ft 6 in (198 cm)
- Weight: 222 lb (101 kg; 15 st 12 lb)
- Position: Defence
- Shot: Left
- Played for: Toronto Maple Leafs; Tampa Bay Lightning; Edmonton Oilers; HIFK; EHC München
- NHL draft: 116th overall, 2007; Calgary Flames
- Playing career: 2009–2021

Keith Aulie (born June 11, 1989) is a Canadian former professional ice hockey player. A defenceman, he played in the National Hockey League (NHL) for the Toronto Maple Leafs, Tampa Bay Lightning, and Edmonton Oilers. Aulie was drafted by the Calgary Flames 116th overall in the 2007 NHL entry draft. Aulie played junior hockey for the Brandon Wheat Kings of the Western Hockey League (WHL), and was honoured as the League's Top Scholastic Player in 2007.

Internationally, Aulie played in the 2009 World Junior Championships, where he paired with Tyler Myers on defence and helped Canada capture a gold medal. He was traded to the Toronto Maple Leafs with Dion Phaneuf, among others, from the Flames during the 2009–10 season. Aulie made his NHL debut with the Maple Leafs in November 2010. Off the ice, Aulie was honoured by the Canadian Red Cross for saving his father after he fell through the ice on the family farm.

== Playing career ==
=== Junior ===
Aulie played junior hockey with the Brandon Wheat Kings of the Western Hockey League (WHL), after being selected in the first round of the 2004 WHL Bantam Draft. Before being drafted, Aulie played minor hockey with the Weyburn Bantam RedCoat Rams. Aulie made his WHL debut with the Wheat Kings during the 2005–06 season, playing in 38 games and recording two assists. After the 2006–07 season, Aulie was named the winner of the Doc Seaman Trophy as the WHL's top scholastic player. He played in 66 games that season, scoring his first career WHL goal, and adding eight assists. The Calgary Flames made Aulie their fourth-round pick, 116th overall, in the 2007 NHL entry draft. In the leadup to the Draft, Aulie was ranked 108th overall among North American skaters by the NHL Central Scouting Bureau. Aulie spent his entire WHL career with the Wheat Kings, and in his final season (2008–09), he served as the team's captain and was named to the WHL Eastern Conference All-Star Team. Aulie improved his point totals in each of his four WHL seasons, finishing with 17 points in his third season and 33 during his final season.

=== Professional ===
Aulie signed his first professional contract with the Calgary Flames in January 2009. After exhausting his junior eligibility, Aulie began his professional career with the Abbotsford Heat of the American Hockey League (AHL), the Flames' top minor league affiliate. During his first professional season with the Heat, Aulie's rights were traded to the Toronto Maple Leafs, along with Dion Phaneuf and Fredrik Sjöström, in exchange for Matt Stajan, Ian White, Niklas Hagman and Jamal Mayers. After the trade, Aulie joined the Toronto Marlies, the Maple Leafs' AHL affiliate, for the remainder of the 2009–10 season. His season was cut short after only five games with the Marlies, however, due to an injury. He played 48 games during his first professional season, scoring two goals and adding four assists between both teams at the AHL level.

At the start of the 2010–11 season, Aulie was assigned to the Marlies after training camp with the Maple Leafs. He was later called up to the NHL on November 12, 2010, when Dion Phaneuf was injured. Aulie played his first career NHL game the next day against the Vancouver Canucks, playing 12 games total with the Maple Leafs in his call-up before ultimately being returned to the Marlies. Despite the time he spent away from the AHL, Aulie was selected to the Western Conference team for the AHL All-Star Game. During the Skills Competition, Aulie competed in the hardest shot event, finishing third, with a top speed of 95.5 mph. After the Maple Leafs traded defenceman François Beauchemin to the Anaheim Ducks, Aulie was called up to rejoin the team. Maple Leafs General Manager Brian Burke said one of the reasons for the trade was to open up a spot at the NHL level for Aulie: "...as soon as we get a roster spot, we're calling up Keith Aulie. We expect him to be here for a while." Aulie engaged in his first career NHL fight against Scott Hartnell of the Philadelphia Flyers, earning him the nickname "Muhammad Aulie." He scored his first career NHL goal against the New York Islanders on March 9, 2011.

Before the 2011–12 season, Aulie was demoted to the Toronto Marlies. On February 27, 2012, he was then traded to the Tampa Bay Lightning in exchange for Carter Ashton. After the trade, Aulie split time between the AHL level with the Norfolk Admirals and Syracuse Crunch and the NHL with the Lightning.

On July 1, 2014, Aulie signed as a free agent to a one-year contract with the Edmonton Oilers. On December 31, Aulie was suspended for two games as a result of an illegal check to Calgary Flames center Matt Stajan.

As a free agent, Aulie accepted a professional try-out contract to attend the training camp of the Arizona Coyotes on September 9, 2015. A month into the 2015–16 season, Aulie was signed to a professional try-out contract with the Coyotes AHL affiliate, the Springfield Falcons on November 3, 2015. Aulie featured in 7 games for 1 goal for his try-out before he was released on November 26, 2015. On January 3, 2016, Aulie signed his first European contract, joining HIFK of the Finnish Liiga for the remainder of the season.

Aulie returned to North America in the off-season and belatedly signed a professional try-out contract to begin the 2016–17 season with the reigning Calder Cup champions, the Cleveland Monsters, on October 18, 2016. After three scoreless games with the Monsters, Aulie was released from his try-out on October 31, 2016. He made a return within the Flames organization on November 3, 2016, signing another professional try-out with AHL affiliate, the Stockton Heat. He played out the campaign with the Heat, adding his veteran presence in scoring 2 goals and 7 points in 54 games.

As a free agent into the 2017–18 season, Aulie again signed late in agreeing to a PTO with the Chicago Wolves of the AHL on October 18, 2017. Aulie made 11 scoreless appearances with the Wolves before he was released from his tryout on November 26, 2017. On December 15, 2017, he signed with EHC Red Bull München of the German DEL.

== International play ==
Medal record

Representing Canada

World Junior Championships
Gold medal – first place	2009 Ottawa	

Spengler Cup
Gold medal – first place	2015 Davos	

Aulie represented Canada internationally for the first time at the 2009 World Junior Championships. He played on a defensive pairing with Tyler Myers and helped Team Canada to a gold medal. Aulie, standing 6'5" tall, and Myers, at 6'7", were nicknamed the "twin towers" by media covering the event. After the tournament, Aulie was honoured by his hometown of Rouleau with a steak dinner, as well as by his then-NHL team, the Calgary Flames, when he attended a game against the St. Louis Blues.

== Personal life ==
Aulie's parents are Bill and Karen. He has a younger sister, Krystal. He attended school in Rouleau, Saskatchewan, until Grade 9, where he helped capture a provincial volleyball championship in addition to multiple provincial track medals. He attended high school at Athol Murray College of Notre Dame in Wilcox, before he began playing with the Brandon Wheat Kings.

In December 2006, Aulie's father was using a tractor to clear snow off a frozen dugout in anticipation of an outdoor shinny game on New Year's Day. The ice could not support the weight of the tractor, and he fell through. Aulie was able to pull his father out of the water and get him to safety. The Canadian Red Cross honoured Aulie with their Rescuer Award for his act.

== Career statistics ==
=== Regular season and playoffs ===
			Regular season					Playoffs
Season	Team	League	GP	G	A	Pts	PIM	GP	G	A	Pts	PIM
2005–06	Brandon Wheat Kings	WHL	38	0	2	2	32	4	0	0	0	4
2006–07	Brandon Wheat Kings	WHL	66	1	8	9	82	11	0	2	2	14
2007–08	Brandon Wheat Kings	WHL	72	5	12	17	81	6	0	3	3	11
2008–09	Brandon Wheat Kings	WHL	58	6	27	33	83	12	2	7	9	12
2009–10	Abbotsford Heat	AHL	43	2	4	6	32	—	—	—	—	—
2009–10	Toronto Marlies	AHL	5	0	0	0	6	—	—	—	—	—
2010–11	Toronto Marlies	AHL	36	3	6	9	61	—	—	—	—	—
2010–11	Toronto Maple Leafs	NHL	40	2	0	2	32	—	—	—	—	—
2011–12	Toronto Marlies	AHL	23	0	1	1	30	—	—	—	—	—
2011–12	Toronto Maple Leafs	NHL	17	0	2	2	16	—	—	—	—	—
2011–12	Tampa Bay Lightning	NHL	19	0	1	1	13	—	—	—	—	—
2011–12	Norfolk Admirals	AHL	3	0	2	2	0	18	1	5	6	10
2012–13	Syracuse Crunch	AHL	20	3	3	6	34	—	—	—	—	—
2012–13	Tampa Bay Lightning	NHL	45	2	5	7	60	—	—	—	—	—
2013–14	Tampa Bay Lightning	NHL	15	0	1	1	9	1	0	0	0	0
2014–15	Oklahoma City Barons	AHL	8	0	1	1	0	—	—	—	—	—
2014–15	Edmonton Oilers	NHL	31	0	1	1	66	—	—	—	—	—
2015–16	Springfield Falcons	AHL	7	1	0	1	11	—	—	—	—	—
2015–16	HIFK Helsinki	Liiga	23	1	4	5	12	17	1	1	2	4
2016–17	Cleveland Monsters	AHL	3	0	0	0	2	—	—	—	—	—
2016–17	Stockton Heat	AHL	54	2	5	7	90	2	0	0	0	0
2017–18	Chicago Wolves	AHL	11	0	0	0	6	—	—	—	—	—
2017–18	EHC München	DEL	18	1	2	3	30	17	1	1	2	43
2018–19	EHC München	DEL	51	4	7	11	78	18	1	0	1	16
2019–20	EHC München	DEL	49	3	5	8	99	—	—	—	—	—
2020–21	EHC München	DEL	20	0	5	5	50	2	0	0	0	2
NHL totals			167	4	10	14	196	1	0	0	0	0

Junior and professional statistics source

=== International ===
Year	Team	Event	Result	GP	G	A	Pts	PIM
2009	Canada	WJC	1st place, gold medalist(s)	6	0	1	1	2
Junior totals				6	0	1	1	2

International statistics source

== Awards and honours ==
Award	Year
WHL
East First All-Star Team	2009
