= Ed Bahr =

Canadian baseball player (1919–2007)

- Pitcher
- Born: October 16, 1919; Rouleau, Saskatchewan, Canada
- Died: April 6, 2007 (aged 87); Fall City, Washington, U.S.
- Batted: Right Threw: Right

MLB debut
- May 1, 1946, for the Pittsburgh Pirates

Last MLB appearance
- July 4, 1947, for the Pittsburgh Pirates

MLB statistics
- Win–loss record: 11–11
- Earned run average: 3.37
- Strikeouts: 69
- Stats at Baseball Reference

Teams
- Pittsburgh Pirates (1946–1947)

Edson Garfield Bahr (October 16, 1919 – April 6, 2007) was a Canadian-born professional baseball pitcher who appeared in Major League Baseball for the Pittsburgh Pirates in 1946 and 1947. Bahr was born in Rouleau, Saskatchewan, but graduated from West Seattle High School in Washington state. He served in the United States Navy during World War II.

Bahr batted and threw right-handed, stood 6 feet 1 inch (1.85 m) tall and weighed 172 pounds (78 kg). His professional career began in 1938 in the Western International League and he was acquired by the New York Yankees' organization the following season. It was interrupted by three years (1942–1944) of U.S. Navy service. The Pirates acquired him from the Yankees after the 1945 minor-league campaign. In his rookie 1946 season, Bahr worked in 27 games, with 14 starts, and posted an 8–6 won–lost record, seven complete games, and a staff-best 2.63 earned run average in 1362/3 innings pitched. But he was ineffective in 1947, was sent to Triple-A Portland after July 4, and spent the remainder of his career in the minors, retiring after the 1950 season.

In his two-season MLB career, Bahr compiled an 11–11 record with 69 strikeouts and a 3.37 ERA in 46 total appearances, including 25 starts and eight complete games. In 219 innings pitched, he allowed 210 hits and 95 bases on balls.

Ed Bahr died at age 87 in Fall City, Washington.

== See also ==
- List of Major League Baseball players from Canada
