= Sieben =

Sieben may refer to:

== People with the surname ==
- Harry A. Sieben, an American politician from the Democratic-Farmer-Labor Party
- Jon Sieben, an Australian former butterfly swimmer
- Katie Sieben, a Minnesota politician and a member of the Minnesota Senate
- Otto Sieben, the pseudonym of Gerhard Narholz
- Todd Sieben, a Republican member of the Illinois State Senate
- Fynn Noah Sieben, a German individual

== Places ==
- Sieben, United States Virgin Islands, a settlement on the island of Saint John in the United States Virgin Islands

== See also ==
- Siebens, a surname
