= Yvette Van Voorhees =

American actress (1953–2026)

- Born: July 1, 1953; Seattle, Washington, U.S.
- Died: April 5, 2026 (aged 72); Puyallup, Washington, U.S.
- Education: West Seattle High School, University of Washington
- Occupations: Actress, dancer, cheerleader

Yvette Van Voorhees (July 1, 1953 – April 5, 2026) was an American actress, dancer, cheerleader and beauty queen, best known for her role as a Muse in the 1980 film Xanadu. She also appeared in the Broadway production of Evita during its original run. Before her career in entertainment, Yvette was a successful cheerleader, being part of the inaugural Sea Gals cheerleading squad for the Seattle Seahawks in 1976, and later a Los Angeles Rams cheerleader. As a beauty pageant participant, she held the Miss Washington World title in 1973.

== Early life ==
Van Voorhees attended West Seattle High School. She participated in various local pageants, and became the West Seattle HiYu Queen's first princess in 1972. She joined the University of Washington and became part of the 14 member varsity yell squad, being selected from over 65 contestants in a two-day competition.

== Career ==
Having been successful in the West Seattle HiYu pageant, Voorhees entered the Miss Washington World pageant, part of the Miss World competition. Initially, she was the runner-up to Lexie Brockway who herself would go on to be runner-up in the Miss World USA competition to Marjorie Wallace. When Wallace won the Miss World crown in 1973, protocol meant that Lexie Brockway became Miss World USA and in so doing relinquished her Washington crown to Van Voorhees who therefore became Miss Washington World.

Having been a cheerleader at the University of Washington.oorhees became a cheerleader for the Seattle SuperSonics basketball team. She then went on to try out for the newly created Sea Gals cheerleading squad for the Seattle Seahawks in 1976 and became a member of that inaugural squad of 21 women led by director Holly Lemke. Van Voorhees was the first hopeful to perform at the try outs at Mercer Island and her performance was described as "downright spectacular". The Sea Gals made their first appearance during the Seahawks' first ever game against the St Louis Cardinals on September 12, 1976. She later became a cheerleader for the Los Angeles Rams when she was based in Los Angeles.

Having moved to Los Angeles, Van Voorhees worked as a dancer at Disneyland's Golden Horseshoe Revue and appeared in various television shows including Benson, It's a Living and Good Morning America. She additionally featured in commercials for Pond's and Datsun and was in the Los Angeles Civic Light Opera's performance of Guys and Dolls. Her most prominent role was as a featured performer in the film Xanadu, where she played one of the immortal muses, sisters to the muse played by Olivia Newton-John. Following Xanadu, Van Voorhees appeared a number of times on the Los Angeles stage such as in the musical ‘’Walls’’ at the Huntington Hartford Theater in 1983. However, Van Voorhees did not remain active in the industry long-term.

== Personal life and death ==
Van Voorhees identified as Native American. She died on April 5, 2026, at the age of 72, after a lengthy battle with Parkinson's disease.
