= Norman Green =

Canadian former hockey executive (born 1934)

- Born: 12 June 1934 (age 92); Winnipeg, Manitoba, Canada
- Occupations: Shopping mall developer, and ice hockey team owner.
- Known for: Moving the Atlanta Flames to Calgary; Moving the Minnesota North Stars to Dallas
- Spouse: Kelly Green

Norman Neil Green (born 12 June 1934) is a shopping mall developer and owner from Calgary, Alberta. He was an original director and one of the principal investors in Sage Telecom, a private, telecommunications company operating in eleven US states. He was also chairman and sole owner of Stewart, Green Properties Ltd., which owned a group of private companies specializing in the development and management of major shopping centers in Canada and the U.S., owning and operating approximately 5,000,000 square feet (460,000 m^{2}) of commercial real estate. The former owner of the Minnesota North Stars and part-owner of the Calgary Flames, he was a member of the National Hockey League Board of Governors from 1979 to 1996, serving on all of its strategic committees.

== Career ==
In 1979, Green joined Harley Hotchkiss, Norman Kwong, Ralph Scurfield, B.J. Seaman, and Doc Seaman in buying the Atlanta Flames of the National Hockey League and moving them to Calgary as the Calgary Flames. His name was etched on the Stanley Cup when the Flames won it in 1989.

At the NHL's request, Green sold his stock in the Flames and bought the Minnesota North Stars in 1990 from George and Gordon Gund. He was the owner of the North Stars who made the decision to move the team to Dallas in 1993 despite the team making a Cinderella run to the Stanley Cup Final in 1991. In 1993, he moved the North Stars to Dallas, citing poor attendance in Minnesota, and the team became rechristened as the Dallas Stars.

Two years later in December 1995, amid financial problems stemming from his business ventures outside of hockey, Green was forced to sell the Dallas Stars to Tom Hicks, with the sale closing in early 1996. When the Stars won the Stanley Cup in 1999, Hicks sent Green a championship ring in honor of his services to the franchise.

Green was chairman of the Calgary Chamber of Commerce in 1977 and renovated the former Oddfellows Temple that would become the Chamber's new home. and of the Hockey Hall of Fame historical building in downtown Toronto in 1997.

== Controversy ==
After relocating the North Stars franchise to Dallas, the team's unauthorized use of copyrighted photography owned by Minnesota photographer Frank Howard sparked a copyright infringement lawsuit that eventually led to a $65,000 settlement funded by Green.

A 1993 Sports Illustrated article stated Green was much reviled in Minnesota following the decision to move the team. While Green defended his decision, citing poor attendance during a string of losing seasons and the failure to reach stadium deals in Minneapolis or Saint Paul, the move to Dallas was also prompted by a series of harassment allegations against Green which involved former female employees and fans, including Kari Dziedzic, a DFL senator from Minneapolis, who had previously worked as Green's executive assistant. Dziedzic claimed that Green would engage in inappropriate behavior such as shaking females to check if they were wearing a bra and demanding kisses from female employees. In a deposition supporting Dziedzic's suit against Green, former Stars senior vice president Pat Forciea claimed under oath that the harassment allegations ultimately led Green to move the team to Dallas, and the financial situation was only a pretext to justify leaving the Twin Cities. Green's wife, Kelly, also threatened to leave him unless he moved the team to avoid the increasing media pressure.

== Other ventures ==
Green was an original director and one of the principal investors in Sage Telecom, a private, telecommunications company. He was a director of TIMET and the chairman and investor in Mirage Systems, and other smaller enterprises. He has been active in philanthropic and community service activities for over 30 years. Currently, he is a member of the executive committee of the board for the Cox School of Business at Southern Methodist University and Woodall Rogers Park Foundation, and a board member of the Bank of America advisory board central division.
