= Harley Hotchkiss =

Canadian businessman

CC AOE Harley Hotchkiss
- Hockey Hall of Fame, 2006 (Builder)
- Hotchkiss, c.2009
- Born: July 12, 1927 Tillsonburg, Ontario, Canada
- Died: June 22, 2011 (aged 83) Calgary, Alberta, Canada
- NHL team: Calgary Flames

Harley Norman Hotchkiss CC AOE (July 12, 1927 – June 22, 2011) was a Canadian business and community leader who was best known for his contributions to health and sports development in Canada. He was part of the consortium that brought the Atlanta Flames of the National Hockey League (NHL) to Calgary in 1980, and remained a part-owner of the Calgary Flames until shortly before his death. For much of that time, he was the team's governor, and hence the public face of the ownership group. He served as chairman of the board of the NHL between 1995 and 2007, and was inducted into the Hockey Hall of Fame as a builder in 2006.

A graduate of Michigan State University in 1951 and a geologist by trade, Hotchkiss moved to Calgary in 1951 and began a long career in the oil and gas industry. He served as president of Alcon Petroleum into the 1960s, and started up his own companies, including Sabre Petroleum with long-time business partners Byron and Doc Seaman. His peers remembered him as an "icon" in the industry. In 1980, he joined with Ralph T. Scurfield, Norman Green, Norman Kwong and the Seaman brothers to buy the Flames and move them to Calgary.

A noted philanthropist, the University of Calgary's Hotchkiss Brain Institute is named in honour of his contributions. He also supported Hockey Canada, investing in the growth of the sport across the country. He was named an Officer of the Order of Canada in 1997, elevated to Companion in 2009, and named to the Alberta Order of Excellence in 1998. In May 2012, it was announced that a new neighbourhood in southeast Calgary, Hotchkiss, would be named after him.

In 2009, Harley Hotchkiss along with Paul Grescoe wrote a memoir, Hat Trick - A Life in the Hockey Rink, Oil Patch and Community.

Preceded by Bruce McNall	Chairman of the NHL Board of Governors; 1995–2007	Succeeded by Jeremy Jacobs
