= Carole Epp =

Canadian potter and writer

- Born: 1978 (age 47–48)
- Education: University of Regina, Australian National University
- Website: www.caroleepp.com www.musingaboutmud.com

External media

Audio
- Carole Epp, Musing About Mud, The Potter's Cast, 2014

Video
- “Carole Epp; Artist, Curator, Researcher, Writer - Make & Do Ceramics”, #10DigitTech Recap Series, May 13, 2020
- “Talking Clay Field Trip to Carole Epp's Studio“, CLAYflicks Video, May 15, 2020
- Carol Epp videos, Ceramic Arts Network

Carole Epp (born 1978) is a Canadian potter, curator, and writer who resides in Saskatoon, Saskatchewan. She is a co-author of Ceramics : profiles of potters and artisans (2020). Epp's work in ceramics is divided into two distinct bodies of work: figurative sculptural objects and domestic functional objects. In 2017 Epp was named the Ceramic Artist of the Year by Ceramics Monthly, published by the American Ceramic Society.

== Education ==
Carole Epp was born in 1978. She earned a Bachelor of Fine Arts in 2001, from the University of Regina, where she studied ceramics and art history. Her teachers included Ruth Chambers, Jack Sures, and Rory MacDonald. Epp received her Masters of Arts from the Australian National University in Canberra, Australia in 2005. Her teachers there included Janet DeBoos, Greg Daly and Gail Nichols.

== Career ==
Epp maintains her own full-time studio practice in Saskatoon. Epp's work has been exhibited in Canada, the United States, Australia and Scotland. Her works are included in collections such as the Saskatchewan Arts Board and the Australian National University.

Epp's ceramics fall into two distinct bodies of work: figurative sculptural objects and domestic functional objects. In her figurative sculptures, Epp mixes elements of religious iconography, headlines, pop culture and nostalgic kitsch, often incorporating or referencing collectible figurines in disturbing ways. Her functional works are often lighter and more whimsical, implying narratives through storybook images.

Epp also teaches workshops, presents at symposia, writes for craft and art magazines, and edits the ceramic arts blog "Musing About Mud". She is a founding member of Saskatoon's Flock and Gather Craft Collective. She is a co-founder with Mariko Paterson and others of the Make and Do Ceramics collective of artists, which presents the work of Canadian clay artists at a national and international level.

== Awards ==
In 2017 Epp was named the Ceramic Artist of the Year by Ceramics Monthly, published by the American Ceramic Society. She was the runner-up for the Winifred Shantz Award from the Canadian Clay and Glass Gallery in 2012 and 2013. Epp won first prize in the Interpreting Ceramics writing competition in Cardiff, Wales in 2006.
