= Sonia Scurfield =

Canadian businesswoman and philanthropist (1928–2018)

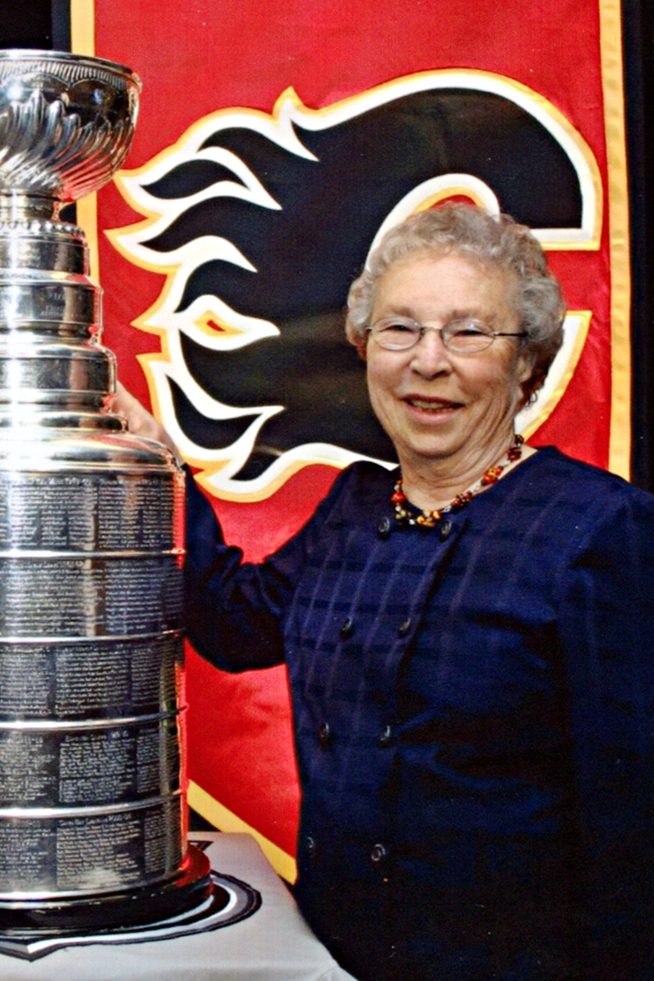
- Scurfield in February 2006
- Born: Sonia Onishenko; September 19, 1928; Hafford, Saskatchewan, Canada
- Died: June 14, 2018 (aged 89); Calgary, Alberta, Canada
- Education: University of Saskatchewan; University of Manitoba
- Known for: co-owner of the Calgary Flames (1985–1994)
- Spouse: Ralph Thomas Scurfield

Sonia Scurfield, (née Onishenko; September 19, 1928 – June 14, 2018) was a Canadian philanthropist. She was the co-owner of the Calgary Flames hockey team from 1985 to 1994. She became the second woman, and the only Canadian woman, to have her name engraved on the Stanley Cup when the Flames won the National Hockey League championship in 1989.

== Early life and education ==
Sonia Scurfield was born on September 19, 1928, to Ukrainian immigrant parents, John Onishenko and Motia (Stupka) Onishenko. She was educated at the University of Saskatchewan, graduating in 1949 with a Bachelor of Arts as a lab technician. Afterward, she completed one year at the University of Manitoba where she earned a Bachelor of Social Work.

== Career ==
She married Ralph T. Scurfield, on July 24, 1954, in Edmonton, Alberta. Together they raised seven children in Calgary, Alberta. Ralph Scurfield was part of the original consortium that bought the Atlanta Flames in 1980 and moved them to Calgary, and Scurfield inherited his interest upon his death.
