= Howard E. Ross =

Canadian businessman (1921–2010)

- Born: March 8, 1921
- Died: June 4, 2010 (aged 89)
- Occupations: Land developer and builder

Howard E. Ross (8 March 1921 in Drumheller, Alberta – 4 June 2010 in Calgary, Alberta) was a pioneering land developer and builder in Canada. He was the former chairman of Carma Developers, and the former national president of the Canadian Home Builders' Association.

During his iconic 37 year building career, from 1946 to 1983, Ross successfully owned three housebuilding firms and built over 3,000 homes in Calgary and Edmonton. In 1956 Ross became a director of the Calgary Home Builders Association, and in 1966 he was named its president. In 1958 Ross was a founding member of Carma Developers. He remained closely involved with Carma, serving as a director before he was elected chairman of the board in 1978.

Ross was also a director of the Canadian Home Builders' Association (CHBA), and held the position as chairman of the Alberta chapter. In 1976 Ross was elected to be the national president of the Canadian Home Builders' Association.

Ross received many honours from his peers in the building industry, including the prestigious National Home Builders Award of Honour which he received in 1968.
