= Seahawks Dancers =

Cheerleaders for the Seattle Seahawks

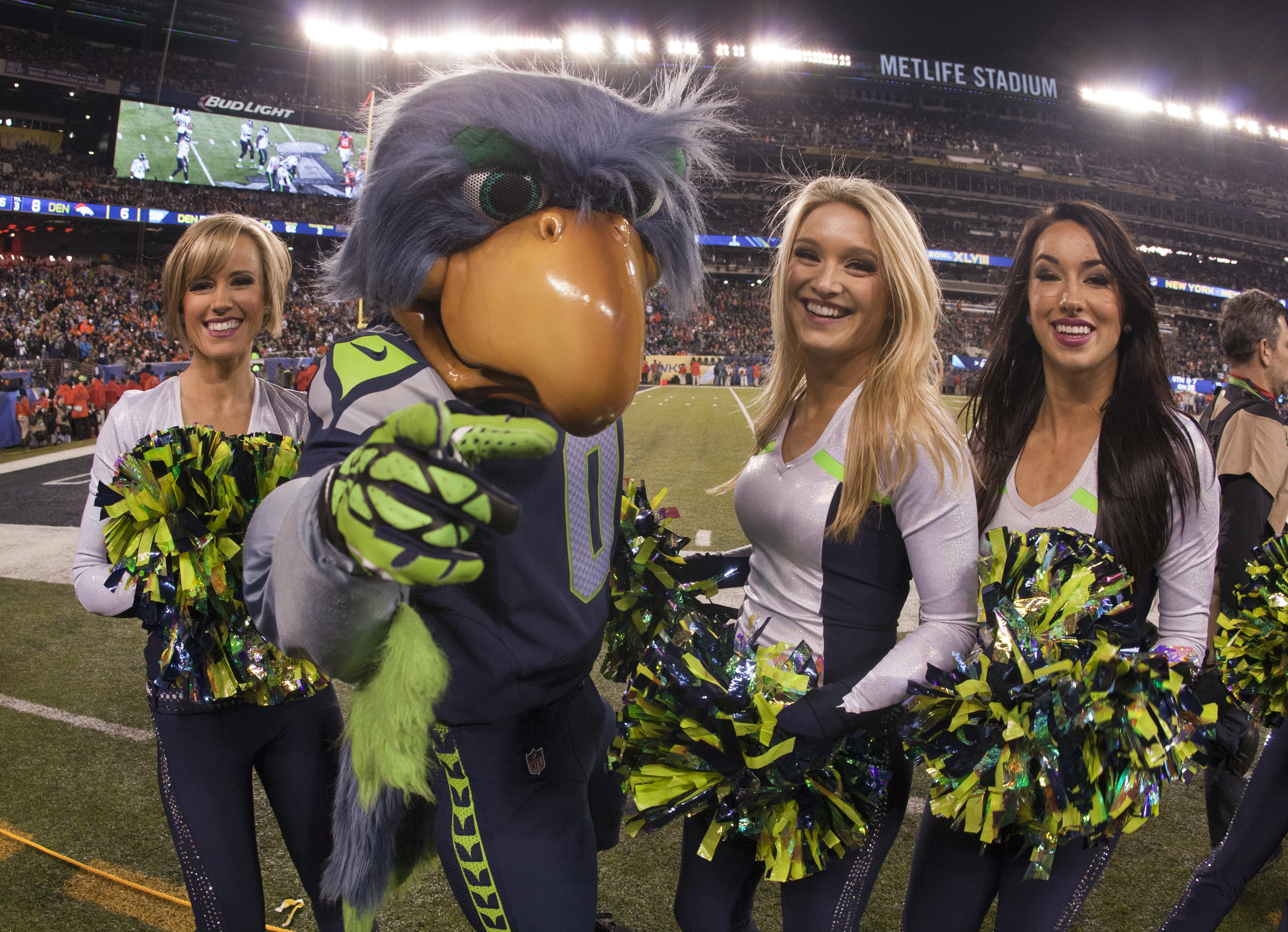
- Blitz and then called Sea Gals at Super Bowl XLVIII
- Established: 1976; 50 years ago
- Members: 16
- Director: Courtney Moore
- Affiliations: Seattle Seahawks
- Website: Official website

The Seahawks Dancers, formerly known as the Sea Gals, are the official cheerleading squad of the NFL team Seattle Seahawks. The Seahawks Dancers perform a variety of dance routines during home games. Previously, a select performance team called the Sea Gals Show Group traveled to perform in parades, events overseas and at home with the USO. They also participated in events with other NFL Cheerleaders around the world.

Since 2019, the group has been re-branded to the "Seahawks Dancers", and now includes male cheerleaders/stuntmen. They perform styles such as classic NFL Jazz/Pom and Hip Hop. They are now along with the Baltimore Ravens Cheerleaders as a permanent co-ed squad. The Seahawks along with the Indianapolis Colts, Philadelphia Eagles, New Orleans Saints, Los Angeles Rams, Tennessee Titans, and New England Patriots are the only ones with males on their squads. The rebranding came in hopes to continue the evolution of their entertainment, such as the addition of the Blue Thunder drumline in 2004.

== History ==
Sherri Thompson served for over 35 years as the Sea Gals Director. She herself was a Sea Gal for three seasons, beginning in 1981. In 2018, Courtney Moore took over as Director. She also was previously a Sea Gal, as well as a Pro Bowl representative in 2014. She remained as Director through the rebranding to the Seahawks Dancers in 2019.

The first squad after rebranding included 30 female and eight male dancers. They also changed their overall look, moving away from the traditional Sea Gals uniform to many new athletic looks. The Seahawks Dancers additionally brought new styles of dance and tricks to their performances. The team also makes appearances off the field and in the community.

== Auditions ==
A dancer trying out for the Seahawks Dancers must be 18 years old or older and have received a high school diploma or equivalent before the season begins. In 2020, the Seahawks Dancers held auditions virtually.

== Junior Seahawks Dancers ==
The Junior Seahawks Dancers are dancers ages 7–14. The group is limited to the first 250 participants who sign up and pay online. The package includes clinics taught by current Seahawks Dancers and management, as well as a halftime performance. Junior Seahawks Dancers also receive a uniform, photo package, music download, memory video download, and two game tickets. The 2020 Junior Seahawks Dancers program was canceled due to the COVID-19 pandemic.

== Notable members ==
- Amber Lancaster, model on The Price Is Right and actress
- Yvette Van Voorhees, inaugural 1976 squad member, Miss Washington World 1973, actress in Xanadu

== Gallery ==
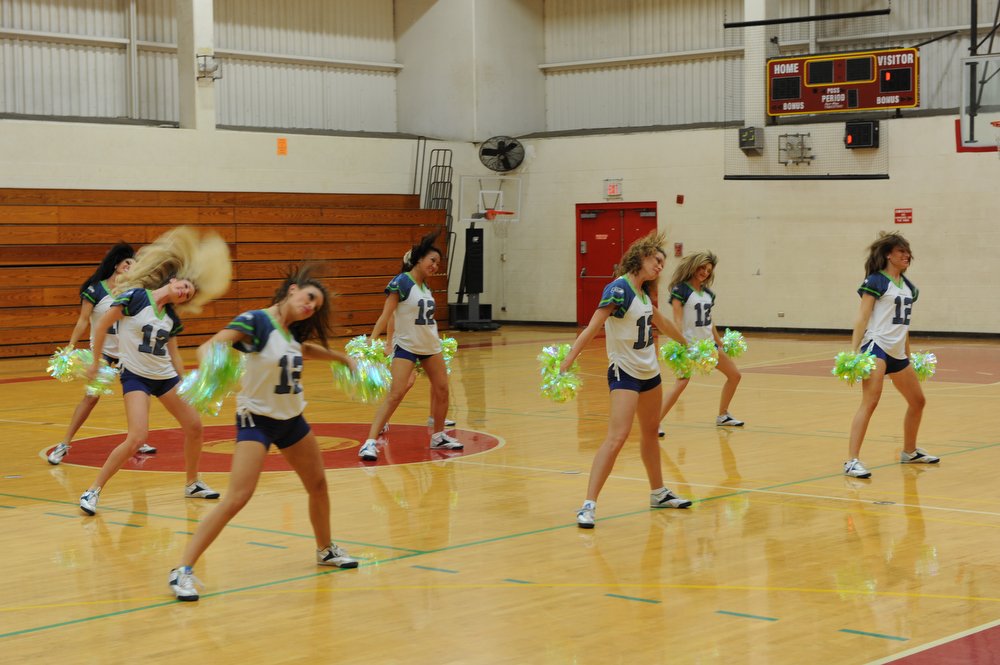

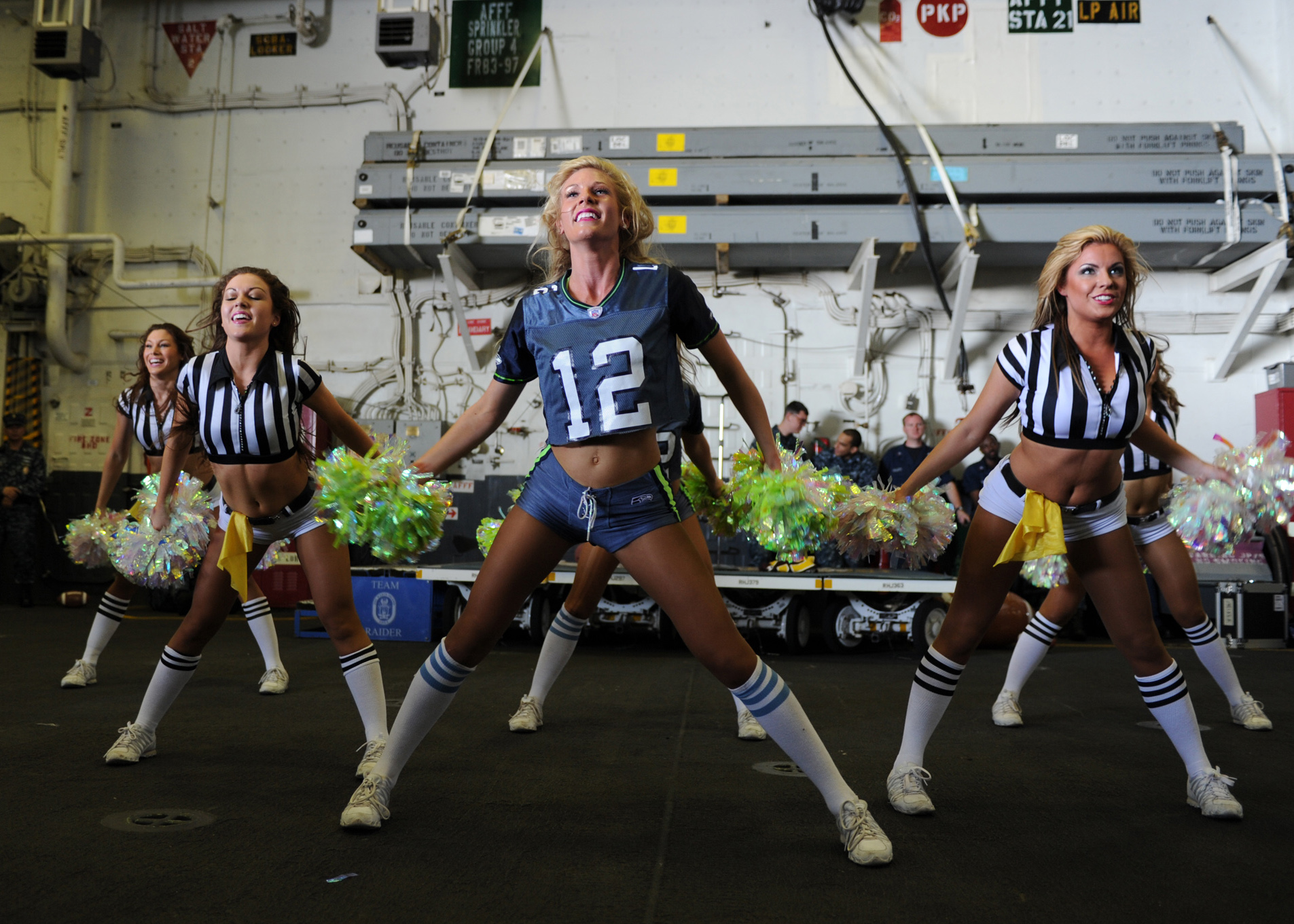

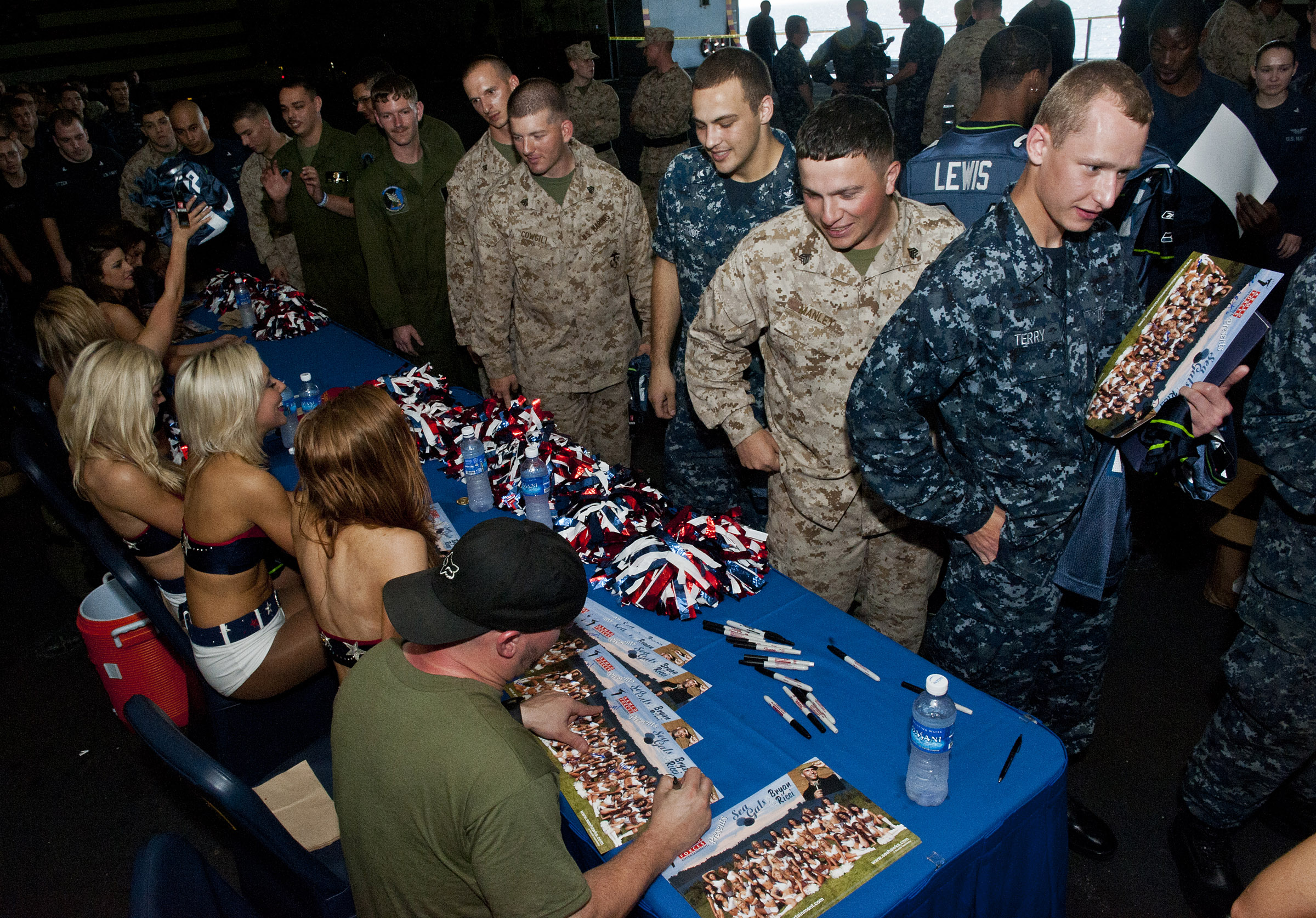

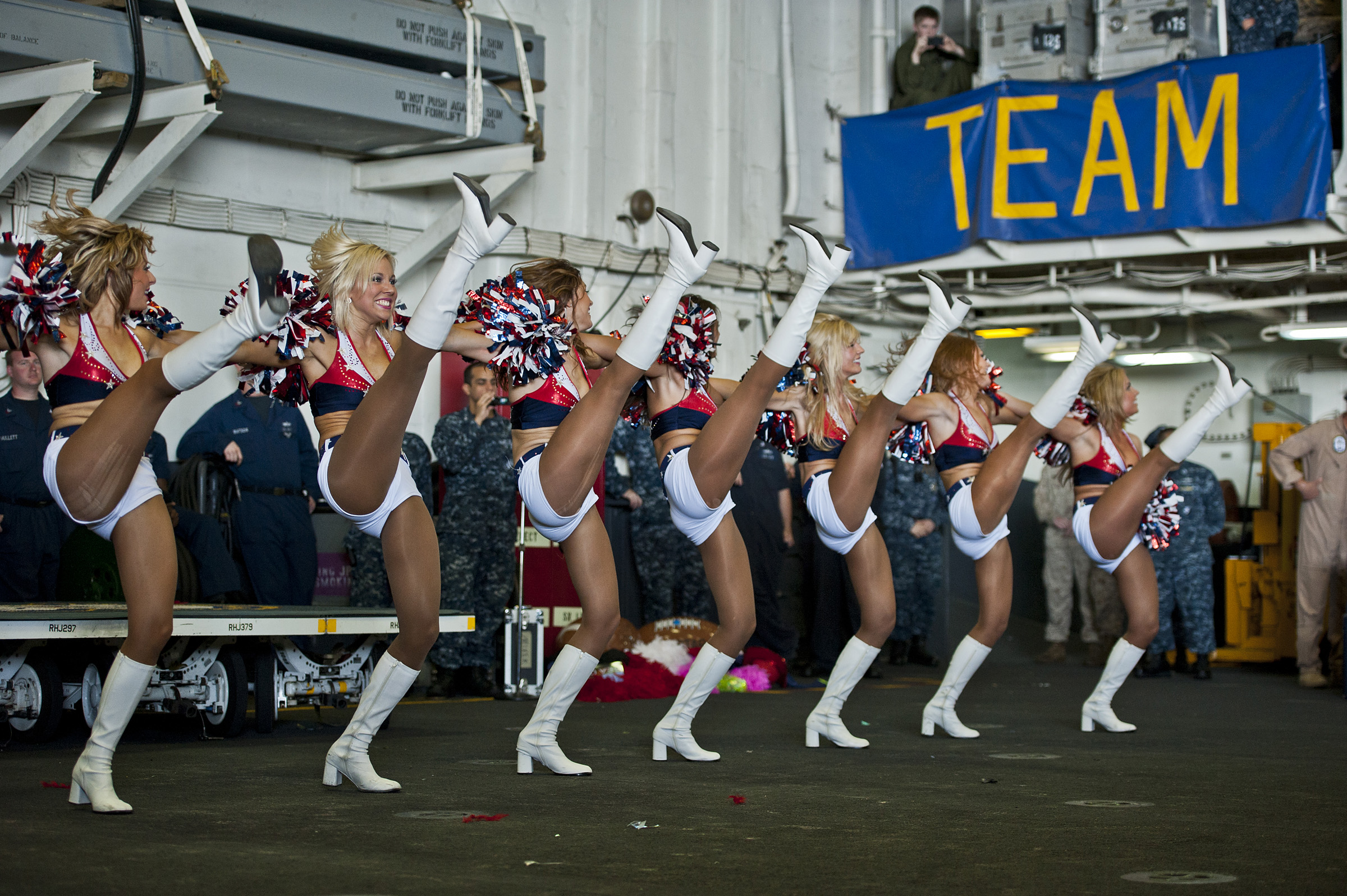

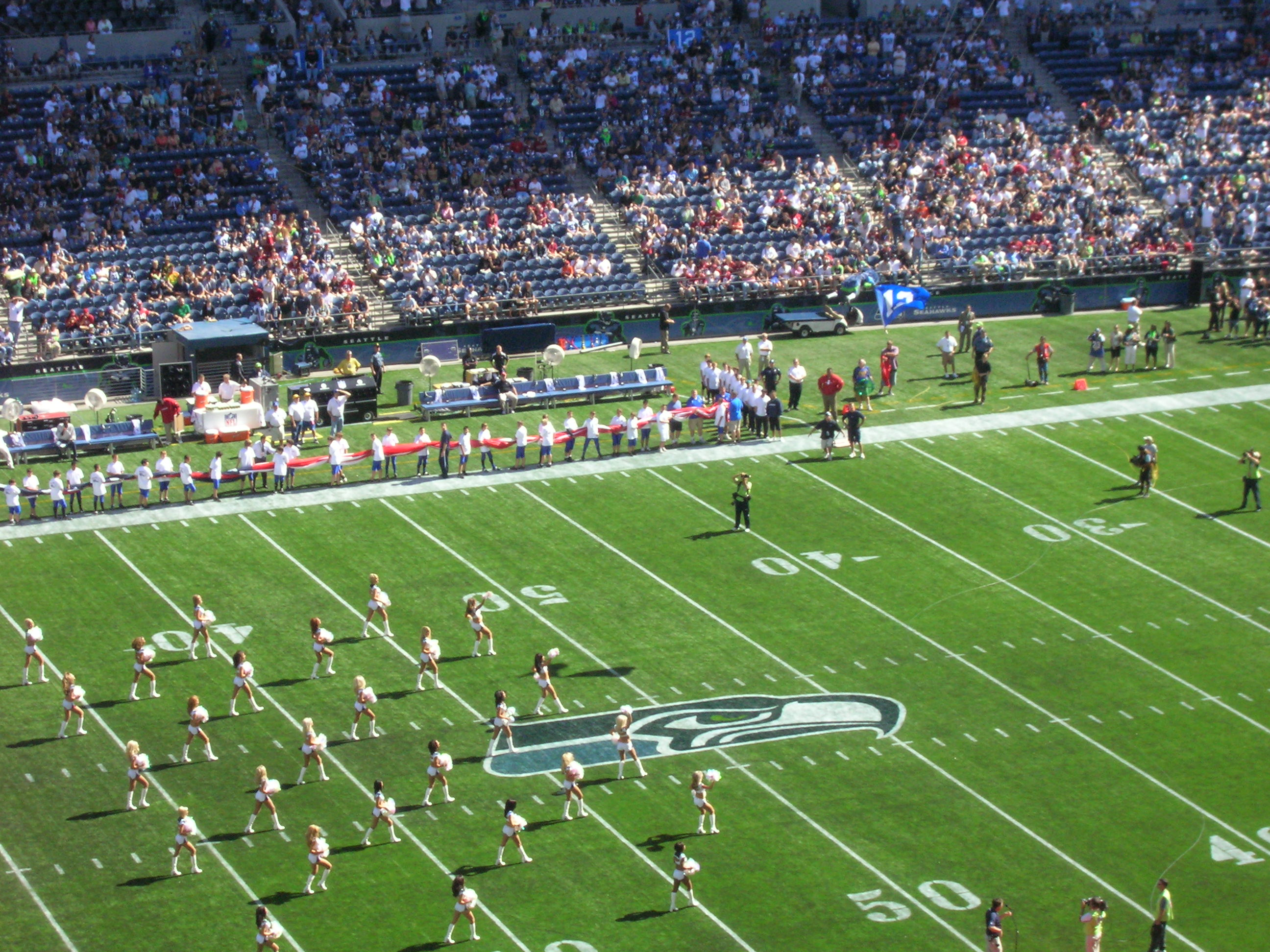
