= Ruth Chambers =

Canadian artist (born 1960)

- Born: 1960 (age 65–66); Toronto, Ontario
- Education: Ontario College of Art Diploma Honours – Toronto 1983, University of Regina MFA 1994
- Known for: Ceramicist, Installation artist, Contemporary Craft Theorist
- Notable work: FIRE+EARTH: Contemporary Canadian Ceramics Pneuma
- Website: http://ruthchambers.weebly.com/

Ruth Chambers (born 1960) is a Canadian installation artist, based in Regina, Saskatchewan. She works with a wide range of media, and her art has incorporated everything from unfired clay, ceramics and found objects to the latest in audio-visual media.

== Biography ==
Chambers was born in Toronto, Ontario, and in 1983 she graduated from the Ontario College of Art as an Associate of the Ontario College of Art. From 1983 to 1984, she worked in the Ceramics Department of the Sun Valley Centre for the Arts and Humanities in Sun Valley, Idaho. She obtained her MFA from the University of Regina in 1994.

Chambers' work has also explored a number of themes. Some of her sculptures have depicted elements of the human body, while other works by her have combined elements of classical design (such as Tuscan order columns) with natural imagery, such as fluttering oak leaves.

Writing in 2006, Chambers said of ceramics and installation: "Ceramics is a medium traditionally associated with craft production and defined by its material qualities rather than its expressed content. Installation on the other hand, usually takes the form of a temporary environment specific in both look and meaning to its location, it employs a range of media, and the materials are often non-traditional and secondary in importance to the idea expressed."

Chambers' more recent installation art explores both natural and architectural themes. Recent pieces feature unfired clay objects placed in darkened space; the pieces are then activated by dramatic lighting and visual projections. According to Chambers, her contrasting style is intended to disorient the viewer, as "these installations are intended to intervene into compemporary architecture with the intent of inserting a different kind of aesthetic into spaces that are usually unornamented and designed to be quite neutral."

Chambers has exhibited throughout both Canada and the United States. She is a founding member of Petri’s Quadrille, a Regina-based artists’ collective (1997–2006). She has exhibited at institutions such as the Burlington Art Centre, the Art Gallery of Nova Scotia, the Canadian Clay and Glass Gallery, and the Mackenzie Art Gallery in Regina, Saskatchewan. She has also exhibited at the Gallery 1.1.1 in Winnipeg, Manitoba.

In 2007, she co-authored a book with Amy Gogarty and Mireille Perron titled Utopic Impulses: Contemporary Ceramics Practice, published by the Ronsdale Press, which includes ten essays on ceramics as a socially responsible practice.
