= Rouleau, Saskatchewan =

Town in Saskatchewan, Canada

Rouleau
- Town
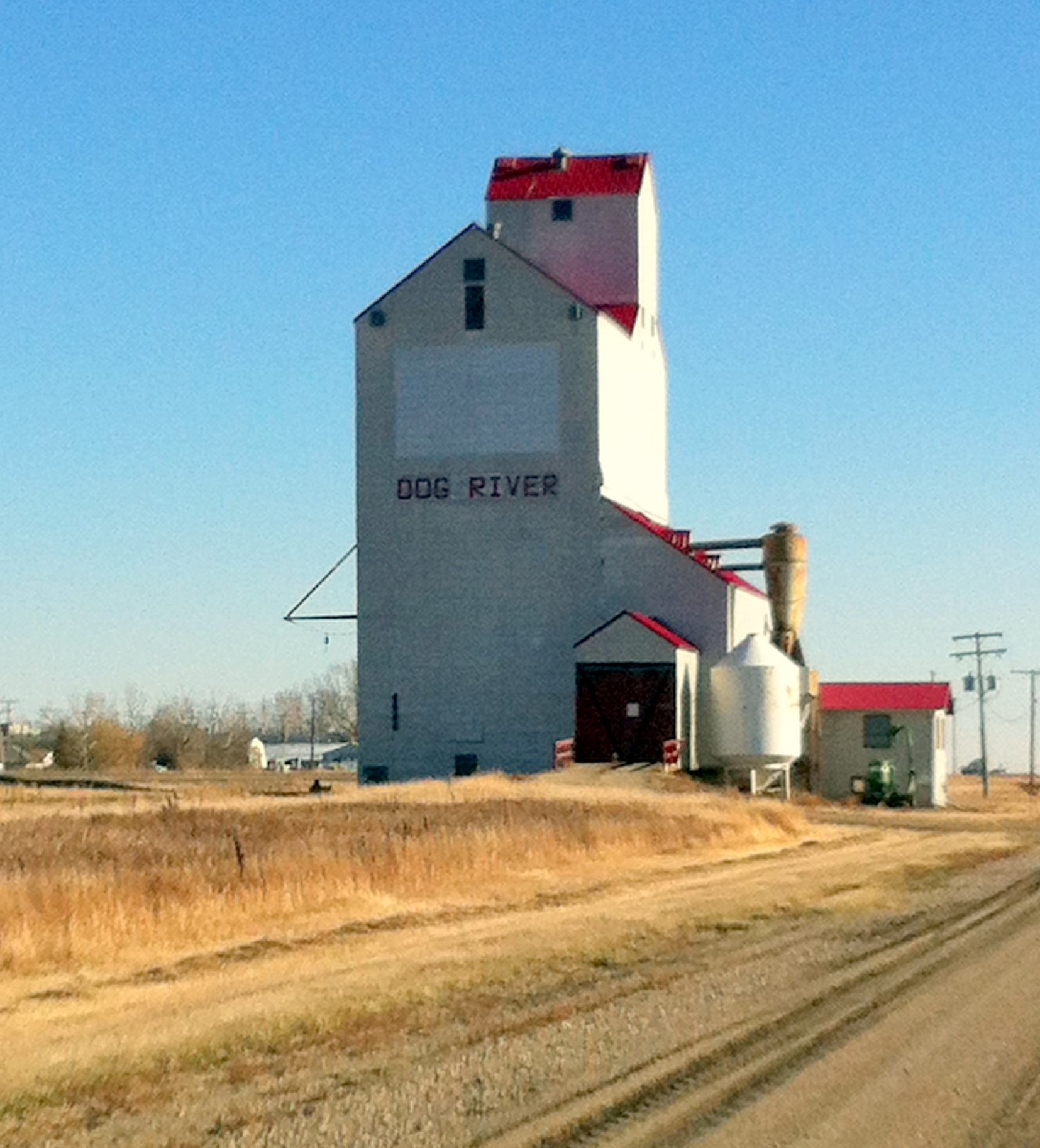
- The former grain elevator in Rouleau, seen in 2012
- Nickname: Dog River
- Rouleau in Saskatchewan Rouleau (Canada)
- Coordinates: 50°11′25″N 104°54′27″W
- Country: Canada
- Province: Saskatchewan
- Post office founded: April 1, 1895
- Incorporated as a village: July 23, 1903
- Incorporated as a town: March 1, 1907
- Named for: Charles Rouleau

Government
  - Type: Mayor-Council
  - Governing body: Rouleau Town Council
  - Mayor: Aaron Brown

Area
  - Total: 1.61 km^{2} (0.62 sq mi)
- Elevation: 580 m (1,900 ft)

Population (2016)
  - Total: 540
  - Density: 282.2/km^{2} (731/sq mi)
- Time zone: UTC−06:00 (CST)
- Postal code: S0G 4H0
- Area Codes: 306 / 639
- ISO 3166 code: CA-SK
- Federal electoral district: Moose Jaw—Lake Centre—Lanigan
- Provincial electoral district: Lumsden-Morse
- Highways: Highway 39
- Website: www.townofrouleau.com

Rouleau /ˈroʊloʊ/ is a town in southern Saskatchewan, Canada, on the Canadian Prairies. It lies within census Division No. 6 and Rural Municipality of Redburn No. 130.

As of 2021, the population was 505 (a decrease of 6.5 percent from the 2016 census), in an area of 1.65 square kilometres (0.64 sq mi). Rouleau is on Highway 39 and is about 35 kilometres (22 mi) southwest of Regina.

The town was notably the filming location of the popular Canadian sitcom Corner Gas, depicting the fictitious town of Dog River.

== History ==
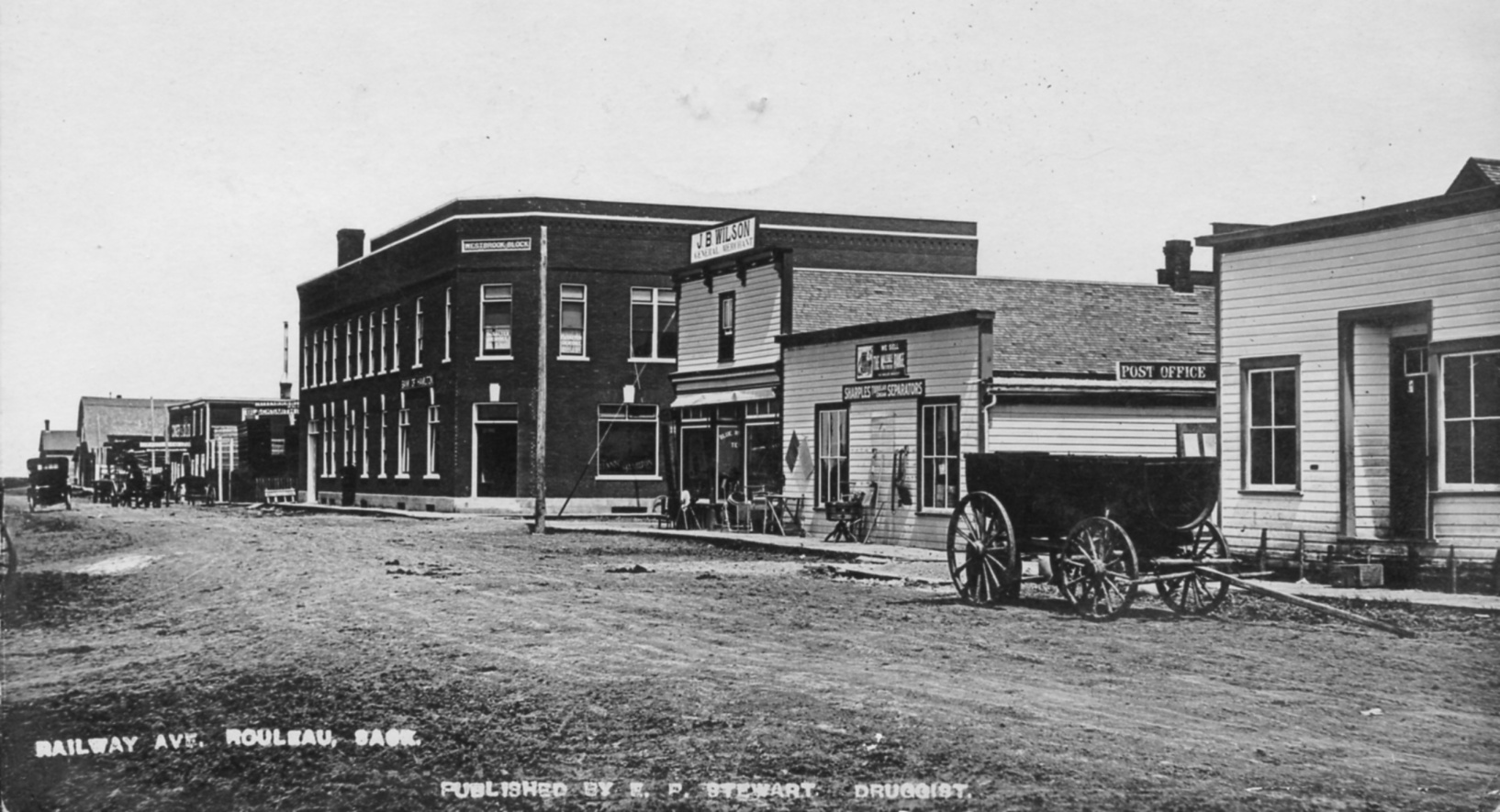
Railway Avenue, 1911

A post office was established at Rouleau in the provisional District of Assiniboia, North West Territories, as early as April 1, 1895. It incorporated as a village on July 23, 1903.

Rouleau was named after Charles Borromée Rouleau. Rouleau was a magistrate in Battleford from 1883 until 1887 and served in the 1st Council of the North-West Territories.

The village is "Saskatchewan's first 1 million bushel town", that is, the first point to ship 1 million imperial bushels (36,000 m^{3}) of grain in one year.

== Demographics ==
In the 2021 Census of Population conducted by Statistics Canada, Rouleau had a population of 505 living in 206 of its 221 total private dwellings, a change of −6.5% from its 2016 population of 540. With a land area of 1.54 km^{2} (0.59 sq mi), it had a population density of 327.9/km^{2} (849.3/sq mi) in 2021.

Canada census – Rouleau community profile

	2021	2011
Population	505 (-6.5% from 2016)	453 (+13.3% from 2006)
Land area	1.54 km^{2} (0.59 sq mi)	1.61 km^{2} (0.62 sq mi)
Population density	328.1/km^{2} (850/sq mi)	282.2/km^{2} (731/sq mi)
Median age	41.6 (M: 39.6, F: 42)	39.9 (M: 40.6, F: 38.5)
Private dwellings	205 (total)	207 (total)
Median household income

References: 2021 2011

== Climate ==
Climate data for Rouleau, Saskatchewan
Month	Jan	Feb	Mar	Apr	May	Jun	Jul	Aug	Sep	Oct	Nov	Dec	Year
Record high °C (°F)	10.9 (51.6)	10.0 (50.0)	17.9 (64.2)	33.7 (92.7)	31.1 (88.0)	33.2 (91.8)	33.4 (92.1)	37.9 (100.2)	31.1 (88.0)	22.5 (72.5)	24.4 (75.9)	8.1 (46.6)	37.9 (100.2)
Mean daily maximum °C (°F)	−9.5 (14.9)	−4.4 (24.1)	6.7 (44.1)	11.9 (53.4)	17.9 (64.2)	20.1 (68.2)	24.8 (76.6)	25.7 (78.3)	17.9 (64.2)	11.5 (52.7)	2.0 (35.6)	−11.7 (10.9)	9.4 (48.9)
Mean daily minimum °C (°F)	−22.2 (−8.0)	−16.6 (2.1)	−7.1 (19.2)	−2.6 (27.3)	3.6 (38.5)	7.1 (44.8)	11.1 (52.0)	10.1 (50.2)	1.6 (34.9)	−2 (28)	−10 (14)	−23.2 (−9.8)	−4.2 (24.4)
Record low °C (°F)	−36.2 (−33.2)	−34.3 (−29.7)	−31.2 (−24.2)	−24.4 (−11.9)	−4.5 (23.9)	1.8 (35.2)	3.0 (37.4)	3.2 (37.8)	−5.6 (21.9)	−15.6 (3.9)	−26.9 (−16.4)	−34 (−29)	−36.2 (−33.2)
Source: Environment Canada, The Weather Network

== Corner Gas ==
Principal shooting set of Corner Gas in 2010

The town is best known as the main filming location for the CTV television series Corner Gas. The series' production team built a full-size mock gas station and coffee shop at the western entrance of the town for filming, causing confusion among visitors thinking Corner Gas and The Ruby were real establishments. The town's grain elevator was also repainted with the name "Dog River" as it appears in the background of many episodes of the series.

For an episode which aired in early 2007, then-Prime Minister Stephen Harper stopped in Rouleau to play a cameo role in the television show.

The buildings used as sets for the program were allowed to fall into disrepair after the show wrapped up production. They were purchased by an entrepreneur, Sylvain Senecal, who converted them into a museum and souvenir shop. The set was demolished in November 2016.

On 28 September 2014, the building that was used as the FOO[D] MAR[KE]T, the local grocery store in the series, was destroyed in a fire. The grain elevator was destroyed in a fire on November 5, 2021, about two weeks after the building used for depicting Dog River's police station collapsed.

== Notable people ==
- Keith Aulie, professional ice hockey defenseman, with EHC Red Bull München in the Deutsche Eishockey Liga.
- Edson Garfield Bahr was a pitcher in Major League Baseball who played for the Pittsburgh Pirates from 1946 to 1947.
- Ken Doraty, professional hockey player; he was born in Stittsville, Ontario, but moved to Rouleau when he was five.
- Marsha Kennedy, painter and instructor at the University of Regina.
- Daryl Seaman, businessman and Hockey Hall of Fame member, was born in Rouleau in 1922.
