= Ralph Thomas Scurfield =

Canadian businessman (1928–1985)

- Scurfield (1979)
- Born: January 7, 1928; Broadview, Saskatchewan
- Died: February 18, 1985 (aged 57) near Blue River, British Columbia
- Education: University of Manitoba
- Occupations: President & CEO of Nu-West Group Limited
- Spouse: Sonia Onishenko (m. 1954)

Ralph Thomas Scurfield B.Sc (January 7, 1928 – February 18, 1985) was a Canadian businessman. He was the president and chief executive officer of Nu-West Group Limited (1957–1985), and was an original owner of the Calgary Flames. On February 18, 1985, he was killed in an avalanche while heli-skiing on Mount Duffy in the Cariboo Mountains, near Blue River, British Columbia.

== Biography ==
Scurfield was a Canadian businessman who founded one of North America’s largest home building companies, Nu-West Group Limited. In 1957, Scurfield took control of Nu-West Homes, a small, privately owned, house-building company operating in Calgary, Alberta. In 1969, Nu-West Homes Ltd. became a publicly traded company and was listed on the Toronto Stock Exchange. By 1981 Nu-West Group Ltd. had become the largest house-building company in Canada, with diversified asset holdings of $88.4 billion, and over 3,700 employees. He was also one of the founding owners of the National Hockey League's Calgary Flames.

Scurfield was actively involved in the establishment of the Faculty of Management at the University of Calgary. The faculty’s building, Scurfield Hall, is named in his honour. Scurfield's family also owned Sunshine Village ski resort located in Banff National Park, and a share of the Calgary Flames Hockey Club.

== Early years ==
Scurfield was born in Broadview, Saskatchewan, on January 7, 1928, the son of Ralph and Ann Scurfield (née Parsons). His family soon moved to the small farming community of Ninga, Manitoba where his father was the station master on the Canadian Pacific Railway line. Ralph was active in sports and enjoyed playing hockey and soccer as a child. Few who knew him from his rural childhood days could have imagined that the bright boy with reddish hair, who walked to the one-room school house with his pet crow on his shoulder, would grow up to become one of the most successful and influential Canadian businessmen of his generation.

Scurfield attended the University of Manitoba, working his way through school by taking summer carpentry jobs in the northern town of Churchill, Manitoba. After receiving his Bachelor of Science degree in 1948, Scurfield became an elementary school teacher. He taught in Manitoba for only two years, before leaving a promising teaching career to pursue his chosen trade of carpentry. In 1951, lured by the booming Alberta economy, he moved to Edmonton, where he quickly found employment with McConnell Homes as a crew foreman. Scurfield was soon settled in Alberta, and in July 1954 he married Sonia Onishenko, the youngest child of Ukrainian–Russian immigrant parents.

Scurfield’s employer, Ches McConnell, impressed with Scurfield’s work ethic and university degree, asked him to move 160 miles south to Calgary to manage the small, financially struggling, house building company called Nu-West Homes. Scurfield agreed, but only on the condition that he be allowed to buy in as a 1/3 partner.

== Career success ==
After mortgaging his house to finance his partnership, in 1957, at the age of 29, Scurfield became president of Nu-West Homes, a Calgary-based company building approximately 40 homes a year. When he moved to Calgary in May 1957, he found that Nu-West was in worse financial shape than he had been led to believe. With only a secretary and a bobcat driver as employees, Scurfield went to work salvaging the reputation of the near bankrupt Nu-West Homes by fixing previously built houses free of charge. By putting in long hours he was able to establish Nu-West Homes as a company of strong customer service. Nu-West quickly became known for quality housing and after-sales service. Under Scurfield’s direction, Nu-West Homes flourished, and Scurfield’s personal stature grew.

In 1969 Nu-West went public, raising 2.9 million in its initial share offering. The money raised was used to purchase land in and around the City of Edmonton enabling Nu-West to enter the Edmonton house building market. The Alberta cities of Edmonton and Calgary were both growing very fast due to the continuing oil boom. Now positioned as the province’s largest house builder, Nu-West provided the homes demanded by the quickly growing population. Nu-West continued to expand and was soon building homes and buildings across Canada and in parts of the United States.

As a result of Nu-West's success, Scurfield became very wealthy and respected. His advice was sought out by city planners, business, and political leaders. He sat as a director with numerous corporations including Carma Ltd., The Mortgage Insurance Company of Canada, MICC Investments Ltd., and Sunshine Village Corporation. He was a part owner of the Calgary Flames Hockey Club, a member of the Faculty of Management Advisory Board of the University of Calgary, a member of the Board of Governors of the Banff Centre for Continuing Education, and he served a term as President of the Housing and Urban Development Association of Canada. He travelled extensively, for both business and pleasure, and was an avid sportsman who enjoyed ice hockey, football, skiing, fishing and golf. In 1969, three years before President Richard Nixon's historic visit, Scurfield (then President of the National House Builder’s Association), was invited to visit the People's Republic of China as part of an official business delegation. In 1981, as a personal guest of former U.S. President Gerald Ford, Ralph and his wife were in attendance to witness the first launching of the NASA Space Shuttle.

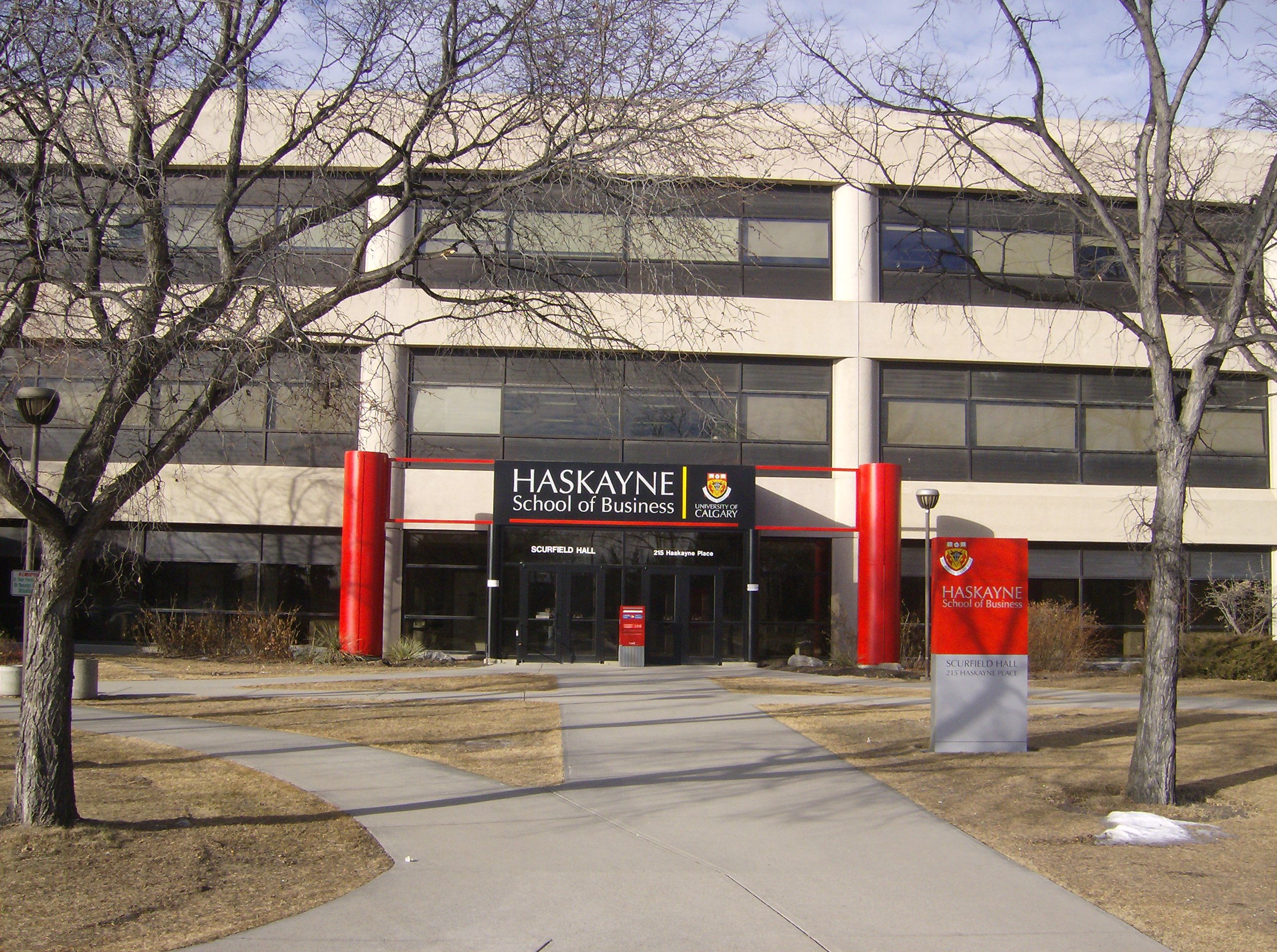
Scurfield Hall at the University of Calgary

Scurfield was one of the founding members of Carma Ltd., a cooperative of independent builders who banded together to form a land development company to provide serviced lots to Calgary homebuilders. In 1963 he became President of the Calgary House Builder's Association, and in 1969 became the President of the National House Builder's Association of Canada. Using his influence, Scurfield established national house building standards, and introduced the "New Home Builder's Warranty Program" which continues to this day. He convinced his contemporary house building competitors that long term quality of life was more important than short-term profit.

Always defying the stereotype, Scurfield demonstrated that a land developer could also be an environmentalist. The lands which are now Nose Hill Park were once privately owned and zoned for residential development. The largest landowners were Nu-West and Carma. Recognizing that the natural beauty of the undisturbed Nose Hill added a distinctive and desirable quality of life to Calgary, in the mid-1970s, Ralph orchestrated a land swap between Nu-West, Carma Developers and the City of Calgary, such that the City gained ownership of the future Park Lands. Over the next decade, the City acquired the remaining parcels of private holdings, and the resulting protected lands are now Nose Hill Park, the largest city-owned natural park in North America, and part of Ralph’s lasting legacy to the City of Calgary and its citizens.

By the end of the 1970s, Nu-West had become a diversified company, and so did Scurfield’s personal holdings. In 1980 the Scurfield Family bought Sunshine Village, a ski resort located in the Banff National Park. In 1981, Ralph Scurfield made a $4 million private donation to the University of Calgary, with a matching donation by Nu-West Group Ltd., to begin construction of a new faculty of management building. The building, named Scurfield Hall, opened on January 1, 1986. Ralph T. Scurfield was also one of six Calgary businessmen who purchased the NHL's Atlanta Flames, which were then moved to Calgary for the 1980–81 season. The other original investors are Harley Hotchkiss, Daryl Seaman, Byron Seaman, Norman Green, and Normie Kwong. When the Calgary Flames won the NHL Championship in 1989, Ralph's widow, Sonia Scurfield, became only the second woman (the first Canadian woman) to have her name engraved on the Stanley Cup.

Things began to get tough in the early 1980s when the federal government brought in the National Energy Program, which didn't allow Albertans to sell oil to other Canadians at world prices. People left Alberta in droves and almost no one bought homes, with existing owners walking away from mortgages. Real estate prices plummeted and the industry collapsed. Nu-West, which was heavily leveraged with debt, lost its place of dominance in the house building industry.

== Death ==
On February 18, 1985, Scurfield and another person died in an avalanche while heli-skiing in the Monashee Mountains near Blue River, British Columbia. The resulting court decision, (Scurfield v. Cariboo Helicopter Skiing Ltd. (1993), 74 B.C.L.R. (2d) 224) on the doctrine of contributory negligence in Canadian law, resulted in a finding that Scurfield was 75% responsible for the incident. An appeal relieved the guide of all legal responsibility.

== Honours ==
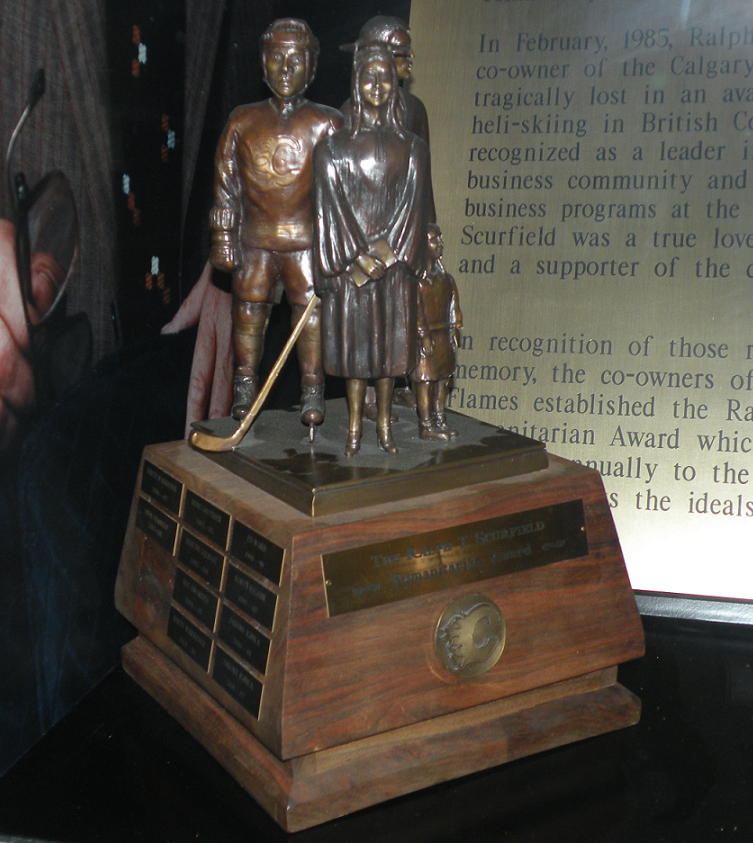
The Ralph T. Scurfield Humanitarian Award is presented each year by Calgary Flames to the player who best exemplifies the qualities of perseverance, determination and leadership on the ice, combined with dedication to community service.

Various honours and places named after Scurfield include:

- The Ralph T. Scurfield Award of Excellence, presented annually by Southern Alberta Institute of Technology (SAIT), is the highest recognition that can be bestowed on a SAIT faculty member.
- The Ralph T. Scurfield Humanitarian Award, is presented annually by the Calgary Flames to the Flames player who best exemplifies the qualities of perseverance, determination and leadership on the ice, combined with dedication to community service.
- The Ralph T. Scurfield Builder of the Year Award, presented annual by the Alberta Home Builders Association, is the Alberta home building industry’s top honour (the winner is commonly referred to as "the best of the best").
- Scurfield Hall Photo of Scurfield Hall, the faculty building housing the University of Calgary’s Haskayne School of Business.
- Scurfield Boulevard and Scurfield Park, located in Winnipeg, Manitoba.
- Scurfield Drive located in Calgary, Alberta.
- In 1986, Scurfield was posthumously named a recipient of the Centennial Award of Merit, awarded by the Centennial of Incorporation Committee to acknowledge Calgarians whose community service has enriched the city’s life for a period of 10 years are more.
- In 2005, Scurfield was selected by Alberta Venture Magazine as the 2nd Greatest Albertan of all time, , behind only the legendary Grant MacEwan.
- In June 2008, Ralph T. Scurfield was nominated as one of Alberta's Greatest Citizens, as part of their "Search for our Greatest Citizen Project.
- In 2015, Ralph T. Scurfield was posthumously inducted into the Junior Achievement - Calgary Business Hall of Fame

== Bibliography ==
- Barbara J. Austin, Capitalizing Knowledge: Essays on the History of Business Education in Canada, ISBN 0-8020-4234-1 (University of Toronto Press, 2000), page 220
- Mark C. Baetz & Paul W. Beamish, Strategic Management: Canadian Cases ISBN 0-256-05987-X (Irwin Professional Publishing, 1987)
- Don Beers, Banff-Assiniboine: A Beautiful World (Canadian Parks and Wilderness Society: Henderson Book Series No. 20) ISBN 0-9695088-2-4 Rocky Mountain Books, 1993) page 74
- Canadian Nature Federation, Nature Canada, Volumes 18-20 (1989), page 10
- City magazine, Volume 6; Volume 8 (1983)
- Max Foran, Expansive Discourses: Urban Sprawl in Calgary, 1945-1978 ISBN 1-897425-13-9 (2008)
- Peter Foster, The Blue-eyed Sheiks: The Canadian Oil Establishment, ISBN 0-00-216608-9 (Collins, 1979), page 224
- Susan Goldenberg, Men Of Property: The Canadian Developers Who Are Buying America, ISBN 0-920510-46-9 (Toronto: Personal Publishers, 1981) pages 71–92
- Housing, Volume 62 (1982)
- Arthur Johnson, Breaking the Banks ISBN 0-88619-072-X (Lester & O. Dennys Publishers, 1986)) pages 147,202
- Donna Kennedy-Glans & Robert Schulz Corporate Integrity: A Toolkit for Managing Beyond Compliance ISBN 0-470-83569-9 (Wiley, 2005) page xxviii
- James Lorimer, The Developers, ISBN 0-88862-218-X (James Lorimer & Company, 1978), page 26
- Ronald Matsushita, Housing: Issues for the Seventies, ISBN 0-07-092862-2 (McGraw-Hill, 1977), page 62
- James H. Marsh, The Canadian Encyclopaedia Volume 1, ISBN 0-88830-272-X (Hurtig, 1988), page 317
- Marie Morgan, From the Ground Up: A History of Carma Developers, (1998)
- Bob Mummery, Countdown to the Stanley Cup: An Illustrated History of the Calgary Flames ISBN 0-919591-48-5 (Raincoast, 1989) pages 36,51,63
- Peter C. Newman, The Acquisitors ISBN 0-7704-1779-5 (McClelland and Stewart, 1982)
- Peter C. Newman, The Canadian Establishment Volume 1 ISBN 0-7704-1500-8 (Seal Books, 1977))
- Peter C. Newman, The Canadian Establishment Volume 2 ISBN 0-7710-6778-X (McClelland & Stewart, 1990)) pages 351,401,454
- Peter C. Newman, Debrett's Illustrated Guide to the Canadian Establishment, ISBN 0-458-96790-4 (Methuen, 1983), page 124
- Peter C. Newman, Titans: How the New Canadian Establishment Seized Power ISBN 0-14-028700-0 (Penguin, 1998)
- Petroleum Publishing Co., 1983 Canadian Oil Industry Directory, ISBN 0-686-45996-2 (Pennwell Corp.)
- Professional builder, apartment business, Volume 42, Issue 6 (1977)
- Charles E. Reasons and Chuck Reasons, Stampede City: Power and Politics in the West, ISBN 0-919946-46-1 (Between the Lines, 1984), page 64
- Michel Robert, The Strategist CEO: How Visionary Executives Build Organizations ISBN 0-89930-268-8 (Quorum Books, 1988) page 21
- Sydney Sharpe, Staying in the Game: The Remarkable Story of Doc Seaman ISBN 1-55002-881-2 (Dundurn, 2008) page 203
- Robert M. Stamp, Suburban Modern: postwar dreams in Calgary page 91
- Travailleur canadien, Volume 14 (1969)
- United States Congress, Impact of Canadian Investment and Energy Policies on U.S. Commerce, ASIN B0038QPT6S (University of Michigan Library, 1981)), page 36
- Cliff White & E. J. Hart The Lens of Time: A Repeat Photography of Landscape Change in the Canadian Rockies ISBN 1-55238-237-0 (University of Calgary Press, 2007) page 101
- Jim Whitehead, The Midas Syndrome: An Investigation into Property Booms and Busts ISBN 0-919478-76-X (Dept. of Geography, University of British Columbia, 1996) page 19
- Who's Who in the World (1982)
- Monica Zurowski, The Fire Inside: Celebrating 25 Years of Calgary Flames Spirit And Hockey, ISBN 1-897229-01-1 (CanWest Books, 2006), pages 8,44

== Newspaper and magazine articles ==
- Mar. 29, 1980 - The Financial Post, p. W9
- July 13, 1981- New York Times, July 13, 1981, Late City Final Edition, Page D3,
- May 19, 1982 - Brandon Sun (Manitoba)
- February 20, 1985 - The Calgary Herald (Scurfield skied into slide), Front page; (Scurfield killed) page A2; (Legacy everywhere), editorial; (Scurfield wanted to be the best), page C1.
- February 20, 1985 - Calgary Sun (Nu-West Boss Dies In Slide), Front Page; (Magnate dies in slide), page 2; (A great loss), editorial page 10; (Scurfield represented Calgary Spirit), page 11; (Developer missed) page38,
- February 20, 1985 - Edmonton Journal (Nu-West kingpin dies as avalanche hits skiers)
- February 20, 1985 - Vancouver Sun (Two skied into slide, operator says/Skiers didn’t hear shouts)
- February 20, 1985 - Toronto Star (Obituary: Ralph Scurfield, 57, co-founder of giant Nu-West Group).
- February 20, 1985 - The Globe and Mail (Nu-West chief part owner of Flames), page 15.
- February 21, 1985 - Vancouver Sun (B.C. avalanche site probed after two killed on skiing trip)
- February 21, 1985 - Calgary Herald (Scurfield’s son rejects claim), page B2; (Obituary), page D8;
- February 23, 1985 - Calgary Herald (Man of vision given farewell)
- February 27, 1985 - The University of Calgary Gazette (in memoriam Ralph Thomas Scurfield, 1928–1985), page 3
- March 4, 1985 - Alberta Report (Skiing into oblivion), page 16; (Carpenter to tycoon), page 16-17.
- December 2, 1986 - Calgary Herald (Five citizens to get community award), page B6.
- January 23, 1998 - The Calgary Herald (The Scurfield Legacy), page D1, D2
- December 2005 - Alberta Venture Magazine, Vol. 09 Issue 10, (The 50 Greatest Albertans)
- June 8, 2008 - The Calgary Herald (125 Of Our Greatest Citizens)
