= Nu-West =

Canadian corporation (1947–1992)

- Company type: Public listed on the TSE
- Industry: Real estate development, Petroleum industry, Lumber and building supplies, Consulting engineering, Mortgage financing
- Founded: 1945
- Defunct: 1992
- Fate: Acquired Glenayre Technologies and continued under that name
- Headquarters: 3030 2 Avenue NE, Calgary, Alberta

Nu-West Group Ltd. was a Canadian growth-oriented house building company that grew into an internationally diversified conglomerate.

In 1957 Nu-West Homes was a small, privately owned, house-building company operating in Calgary, Alberta. In 1969, Nu-West Homes Ltd. became a publicly traded company and was listed on the Toronto Stock Exchange. By 1981 Nu-West Group Ltd. had become the largest house-building company in Canada, with diversified asset holdings of $1.9 billion, and over 3,700 employees. The company was heavily leveraged with debt used to purchase vast holdings of real estate throughout Canada and the United States. This debt, combined with the recession of the early 1980s that saw land values tumble, resulted in Nu-West losing its place of dominance in the industry.

== Beginnings ==
Ralph Scurfield, Nu-West's president from 1957 until his death in 1985, worked long hard hours to build up the near bankrupt house building company into a multibillion-dollar business. Scurfield's route to housing development was circuitous. After receiving his Bachelor of Science degree at the University of Manitoba, he was a school teacher in that province for two years, working the summers on construction jobs. In 1951 Scurfield abandoned his teaching career and drove to Edmonton, lured then, as others are now, by stories of opportunity and wealth in Alberta.

Soon after his arrival, Scurfield got a job working for Cheseley McConnell, a small homebuilder who became one of Edmonton's biggest during the six years Scurfield worked for him. In 1957, two of McConnell's partners, Clifford Lee and Gordon Clark, were saddled with Nu-West Homes Ltd., a 12-year-old near bankrupt homebuilding company located in Calgary. It was rapidly sinking because nobody would buy its poorly constructed houses. Lee and Clark were looking for a manager to replace the one they had just fired.

McConnell knew that Scurfield was eager to become a partner in McConnell's business. It was instead decided that each would buy 25 percent of Nu-West's then $60,000 assets and Scurfield would move to Calgary to revive the company. To come up with his $15,000 stake, Scurfield, in a classic rags to riches saga, sold his Edmonton home for $21,000, recovered the $9,000 home equity, and used $1,500 as a down payment on another house in Calgary. The remaining $7,500 provided half the money toward buying into Nu-West and the rest came from a bank loan. In 1981, Scurfield and his family owned 26 percent of Nu-West, then worth about $50 million. McConnell was the second largest shareholder with 21 percent.

Scurfield took Peter Vast, a Dutch immigrant who was 10 years older and who had worked as a construction crew leader for McConnell, to Calgary with him as his only employee. The two men then set about repairing the shoddy workmanship of Nu-West Homes and, hence, to polish up Nu-West's reputation

During the day, Scurfield and Vast would install towel bars and paint rooms that had been left unfinished. At night, Scurfield would do the estimating and bookkeeping, and Vast would draft designs for the 65 new houses they planned to build in the first year. To further clean up Nu-West's tarnished reputation, Scurfield offered owners of Nu-West homes a five-year warranty, which was the first of its type in Canada. In 1972, the warranty was expanded to a ten-year coverage.

The hard work paid off. Canada Mortgage and Housing Corporation, which had cracked down on Nu-West by chopping off $3,000 from any loan guarantee, removed the restriction. Nu-West's other major source of funds, Investors Syndicate Ltd., which had stopped providing mortgage money because of customer complaints, also restored Nu-West to its lending list.

== Growth ==
Scurfield slowly and methodically enlarged Nu-West, first through geographical expansion and later through a series of acquisitions starting in Canada and then in the United States' Sun Belt. Nu-West had grown from the homebuilder of the 1960s to the more diversified real estate company of the 1970s, and by 1980 Nu-West had become a diversified company with major interests in oil and gas and income properties.

Throughout the 1970s, Nu-West continued its tradition of growth and profitability. During the decade Nu-West's average annual growth in net income has been 49%. In 1979, despite record interest rates and spiralling costs, revenues and net income increased more than 50%, and assets passed the billion dollar mark and totalled $1.28 billion at year end. The financial growth was the result of Canadian land sales, U.S. real estate operations and the successful operations of Voyager Petroleums Ltd. During 1979 the wholly owned Voyager Petroleums increased production and reserves of oil and gas through an aggressive exploration program, and they also increased their acreage holdings substantially.

Highlights of Nu-West's 1979 real estate activities were the growth of the Phoenix operation and the expansion of commercial and industrial operations. Nu-West Development Corporation of Arizona recovered much of its former market position to become one of the largest residential builders in Phoenix. This company also became involved in the profitable condominium conversion market in several "Sunbelt" cities.

Nu-West ended the 1970s proud of their achievements to that point, and entered the 1980 with business goals that included the plan to increase their real estate activities, with emphasis on land and commercial development, and also the expansion of their oil and gas investment so that within five years it would employ approximately one-third of their assets. In 1980, seeking to increase the potential for greater oil and gas revenues, Nu-West aggressively doubled Voyagers' 1979 budget for oil and gas exploration and development programs.

By 1981, just 12 years after going public in 1969, Nu-West evolved from being a poorly regarded Calgary builder to one having operations in five Canadian provinces (British Columbia, Alberta, Saskatchewan, Manitoba, and Ontario) and ten U.S. states (Arizona, California, Colorado, Florida, Georgia, Hawaii, Nevada, New Mexico, Oklahoma, and Texas). Nu-West also had a Seattle, Washington office in the late 1970’s located in Federal Way, Washington. Formerly this entity was United Homes begun many years before by Herman Sarkowsky.

== Early 1980s ==
Things began to get tough in the early 1980s when the Canadian federal government brought in the National Energy Program (NEP), which didn't allow Albertans to sell oil to the Canadian market at world prices. This policy decimated Alberta's Petroleum industry. People left Alberta in droves and almost no one bought homes, with existing owners walking away from mortgages. The negative effects of the NEP, combined with the North American-wide recession of the early 1980s that saw land values tumble, resulted in Nu-West, who was heavily leveraged with debt, losing its place of dominance in the industry.

== Notes ==
Goldenberg, Susan (1981). Men of Property:The Canadian Developers who are Buying America. Personal Library. pp. 71–92. ISBN 0-920510-46-9.
