= Bill Siebens =

American-Canadian oilman (1933–2020)

- Born: 17 November 1933; St. Louis, Missouri
- Died: 29 June 2020 (aged 86); Calgary, Alberta
- Education: University of Oklahoma (BSc 1955)
- Military career
- Allegiance: United States of America
- Branch: United States Air Force
- Service years: 1955-1958

William Walter "Bill" Siebens (17 November 1933 – 29 June 2020) was an American-Canadian oilman. He is best known as the founder and president of Siebens Oil and Gas Limited, a company that operated from 1965 until its sale in 1978.

== Biography ==
William Walter Siebens was born in St. Louis, Missouri on 17 November 1933 to Dr. Harold Walter Siebens and Vera Wolf. He had two sisters, Nancy and Mary Jane, and a brother, Stewart. Siebens attended Principia School where he graduated from the upper school in 1951. During high school he was a member of the football, basketball, and swim teams. Upon graduation he enrolled at the University of Oklahoma in petroleum engineering. He graduated bachelor of science in 1955.

After university Siebens served in the United States Air Force for three years as a pilot. His service included a period in Libya.

When his term in the Air Force was completed in 1958, Siebens moved to Calgary, Alberta, where his parents had relocated. His first job was managing Siebens Leaseholds Limited, a company his father had founded in 1950. In February 1965 he sold controlling interest in the company to Canadian Export Gas and Oil Limited. That same month he formed a new company called Siebens Oil and Gas Limited. The company was notable for acquiring highly productive acreage among the freehold lands of the Hudson's Bay Company. In August 1978, Dome Petroleum purchased a 76 percent stake in Siebens for $360 million.

In 1977, Seibens Oil and Gas was sold through a deal one author described as a "financial masterpiece." The deal involved the purchase of Siebens for $38.50 per share, or a total value of $360 million, by the Canadian National Railways pension fund via a subsidiary called Canpar Oil and Gas Limited. Canpar then sold 76 percent of the Siebens assets to Dome Petroleum. Through its status as a pension fund subsidiary, Canpar was exempted from paying taxes on the sale to Dome. Dome also qualified for tax write-offs on asset purchases. At the time of the sale, the Siebens family held 46 percent equity in the company. The sale netted Bill $40 million and Harold $120 million.

After the takeover of Siebens Oil and Gas, Bill Siebens then became president of Candor Investments Ltd., a private energy investment corporation. He had also chaired the board of Sovereign Oil and Gas, a North Sea oil producer. It was bought by Neste Oil, the Finnish National Oil Company.

In 1994, he joined ResoQuest Resources Ltd. as chairman of the board until it was sold two years later to Pinnacle Resources Ltd. He continued in the same leadership position with Pinnacle until it was sold to Renaissance Energy Ltd. in 1998.

On 22 May 1961, Siebens married Clarice Adrienne Evans at Rundle United Church in Banff, Alberta. The couple had three children, Carter, Rhondda, and Evann. The couple later divorced. Siebens remarried to Sharon. He died on 29 June 2020 at age 86.
