= Richard Haskayne =

Canadian businessman (born 1934)

Richard Francis Haskayne
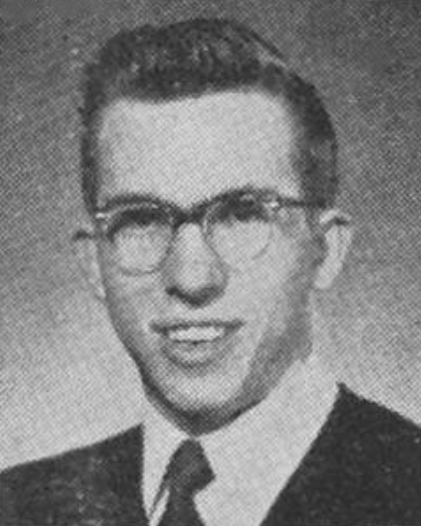
- Born: 18 December 1934 (age 91); Calgary, Alberta
- Education: University of Alberta (BCom '56)
- Spouses: Lee Mary Murray (m. 1958; died 1993) Lois Paula Kenney (m. 1995)
- Website: haskayne.com

Richard Francis Haskayne OC AOE (born 18 December 1934) is a Canadian retired accountant and oilman whose career spanned from 1956 to 2005. Haskayne served as senior officer and director of several major Canadian petroleum companies including Hudson's Bay Oil and Gas Company, Home Oil Company, Interprovincial Pipeline Company, Nova Corporation, and TransCanada Pipelines. Additionally, Haskayne served as chairman of the board of MacMillan Bloedel and TransAlta.

He is also known for his association with the University of Calgary, whose management faculty was renamed the Haskayne School of Business in 2002.

== Biography ==
=== Early life ===
Richard Haskayne was born on 18 December 1934 in Calgary to Robert Stanley Haskayne (1893–1964) and Bertha Hasketh (1891–1961). Robert and Bertha were both born in England, came to Canada in 1913, and married that same year. They had one other son, Stanley (1928–2005). The Haskaynes owned butcher shops in Carseland and Gleichen, and raised their sons in the latter town. Richard entered the University of Alberta in 1952, and in 1956 graduated Bachelor of Commerce. During his time at university Haskayne became a member of Kappa Sigma.

=== Career ===
==== Articling and Hudson's Bay, 1956–1982 ====
Upon graduation in 1956, Haskayne began his accounting career in Calgary as an articling student with Riddell, Stead, Graham & Hutchison. In 1959 he received his designation as a Chartered Accountant. In 1960 he left the firm to join the Hudson's Bay Oil and Gas Company as an accountant. He remained in this role until 1973, when he became the comptroller of Canadian Arctic Gas Study Limited, a consortium HBOG was part of that was investigating the construction of the Mackenzie Valley Pipeline. Haskayne returned in 1975 to HBOG and that year became its vice-president. On 29 April 1980, Haskayne was appointed president of the company, succeeding Stanley G. Olson. Beginning in May 1981, Dome Petroleum undertook a hostile takeover of HBOG. In October of that year, Home Oil Company announced that it had appointed Haskayne president. In January 1982, two months before the Dome deal concluded, Haskayne assumed his new role.

==== Home Oil and Interprovincial, 1982–1991 ====
As president of Home Oil, Haskayne took over one of the country's oldest independent petroleum companies. At the time, the company was a wholly owned subsidiary of Hiram Walker Resources Limited. After Gulf Canada purchased Hiram Walker, in 1986 the Interprovincial Pipeline Company acquired Home. As part of the acquisition, Interprovincial created a new parent company, Interhome Energy Inc, to manage Interprovincial Pipeline and Home Oil. Haskayne remained president of Home, was appointed president of Interprovincial in 1987, and in 1988 became chairman and president of Interhome. In 1991, Interhome dissolved and spun off its two subsidiaries as independent companies. In March 1991, Haskayne stepped down from his role with the company.

==== Nova and TransCanada, 1991–2005 ====
On 1 May 1991, Haskayne was elected to the board of directors of Nova Corporation, formerly the Alberta Gas Trunk Line Company. That August, he took over as head of the company's pipeline, oil, and gas divisions. At the company's annual general meeting in 1992, Haskayne was elected chairman, succeeding Daryl K. Seaman. In June 1998, TransCanada Pipelines acquired all of Nova's petroleum operations, and the petrochemical operations were continued under the name Nova Chemicals. Upon the merger, Haskayne assumed the chairmanship of Trans-Canada. Between 1996 and 1999 he also served as chairman of MacMillan Bloedel, and from 1996 to 1998 as chairman of TransAlta. In April 2005, Haskayne retired as chairman of Trans-Canada and was succeeded by S. Barry Jackson.

=== Personal life ===
On 25 June 1958 Haskayne married Lee Mary Murray of Gleichen. Lee died on 1 October 1993 at age 57 after developing ALS. The Haskaynes did not have children. On 4 September 1998, Haskayne remarried to Lois Paula Kenney, who was the ex-wife of Strathcona-Tweedmuir School founding headmaster William Alexander Heard (1932–2011). Haskayne is a member of the Anglican Church of Canada and the Progressive Conservative Party. He is also a member of the Calgary Petroleum Club, Ranchmen's Club, Calgary Golf & Country Club, and Earl Grey Golf Club.

== Awards and recognition ==
From 1990 to 1996, he was the chair of the board of governors of the University of Calgary and is currently board chair emeritus.

In May 2002, after Haskayne donated C$16 million, the University of Calgary renamed their management faculty the Haskayne School of Business.

In 1997, he was made an Officer of the Order of Canada for "his high ethical business standards" and for having "helped lead fund-raising campaigns for several organizations such as the University of Calgary and the United Way." He is a Fellow of the Canadian Institute of Chartered Accountants (F.C.A.). He was inducted into the Canadian Business Hall of Fame, the Calgary Business Hall of Fame, and the Canadian Petroleum Hall of Fame. He is a member of the Advisory Council of the Order of Canada. He sits on the board of directors for the Alberta Bone and Joint Health Institute. and is also a member of the Community and Partners Advisory Committee of the Libin Cardiovascular Institute of Alberta.

In 2006, he received the Alberta Order of Excellence.

== Published works ==
Haskayne's memoir Northern Tigers: Building Ethical Canadian Corporate Champions was published on March 28, 2007 by Key Porter Books.
