= Haskayne School of Business =

Business school at the University of Calgary

Coordinates: 51.077379°N 114.124866°W

Haskayne School of Business, University of Calgary
- Type: Public
- Established: 1967
- Dean: Gina Grandy
- Administrative staff: 144
- Undergraduates: 3900
- Postgraduates: 800
- Location: Calgary, Alberta, Alberta, Canada
- Campus: Urban

The Haskayne School of Business is the University of Calgary's business school, located in Calgary, Alberta, Canada. It is named after Richard F. Haskayne, who gave one of the largest endowments to a business school in Canada. The school offers undergraduate, masters, and PhD degrees, as well as executive education programs. Haskayne is ranked as one of the top business schools in Canada and one of the top 100 in the world.

== History ==
Founded as the Faculty of Business in 1967 and renamed Faculty of Management in 1978, the school was later renamed in honour of Richard F. Haskayne in 2002. In 1986, the faculty moved into the newly constructed Scurfield Hall, which was the result of donations made by Ralph Scurfield, his family, and Nu-West Group of Companies. The new building cost $16 million. In 1991, an additional floor was added to the building at a cost of $3.3 million.

In 2002, Richard (Dick) Haskayne, a University of Alberta graduate, made a $16 million contribution to the school. The school was named in his honour. Haskayne donated $8 million in cash and $8.7 million in land. In 2006, the 219-acre parcel of land was sold to the City of Calgary for $20 million.

In 2018, the University announced a capital expansion project, Mathison Hall, which was the result of a $20 million gift from Ronald P. Mathison, a Calgary entrepreneur and chairman of Matco Investments, as well as other business leaders. Mathison’s father, Ken, was a lifelong friend of Richard Haskayne. The building broke ground in May 2020, and opened on January 9, 2023, at a cost of $90 million. The new four-storey, 10,000-square-metre building will expand the capacity to accommodate an additional 4,000 Haskayne School of Business students. Upon its opening, Haskayne Dean Jim Dewald called it “the most advanced business school building in Canada”.

== Programs ==
=== Undergraduate ===
The Haskayne School of Business offers four-year Bachelor of Commerce degrees in 18 concentrations. BComm concentrations include Accounting, Business Process Management, Energy Management, Entrepreneurship & Innovation, Finance, General Commerce, HR and Organizational Dynamics, International Business, Management Information Systems, Marketing, Operations Management, Personal Financial Planning, Petroleum and Land Management, Real Estate, Risk Management and Insurance, Risk Management: Insurance and Finance, Supply Chain Management, Tourism Management, and Tourism Management & Marketing.

A BComm Cooperative Education program is available, allowing students to gain hands-on experience in their field prior to graduating.

=== MBA / Executive MBA ===
The Haskayne School of Business offers full- and part-time MBA programs. In 2009, the Financial Times ranked the Haskayne Executive MBA program 36th overall in the world and fourth in Canada.

=== Global Energy Executive MBA ===
The Global Energy Executive MBA is a joint initiative of the Haskayne School of Business and IHS-Cambridge Energy Research Associates. Announced in 2010, the program was rolled out with a $1 million donation from school namesake Richard Haskayne along with local sponsorship from Calgary-based energy firms. University president Elizabeth Cannon outlined that the program will "develop responsible and responsive energy sector leaders by using an innovative teaching model that combines experiential learning and problem-solving with personal leadership development."

The program consists of five interactive learning modules completed around the world. Modules are located in Calgary, the United States, and London, with another module located in either the Middle East or Asia. The 16-month program is set to launch in April 2012, with initial enrollment set at 40 students. The program curriculum will focus on energy-specific issues, such as project finance, climate change & sustainable development, and sovereign & geopolitical challenges.

== Rankings and reputation ==
=== Rankings ===
- In 2016, the school was ranked the #9 MBA program in the world for social and environmental impact by Corporate Knights Magazine. In the 2010 Rankings, the school's undergraduate program placed a close third nationally with a 73.4% score, and the graduate program placed second with an 83.7% score.
- In 2010, The Economist ranked Haskayne's MBA program 3rd within Canada, 43rd in North America, and 82nd worldwide.
- In the 2011 Aspen Institute "Beyond Grey Pinstripes" rankings, the Haskayne MBA was ranked 35th in the world's top-100 business programs (up from 51st in 2010) and third in Canada.

=== Inter-Collegiate Business Competition (ICBC) ===
The Haskayne School of Business has for years dominated the Inter-Collegiate Business Competition (I.C.B.C), hosted annually by Queen's University. For much of the competition's history, teams representing Haskayne have come out on top by winning first place in the majority of the competition's case study categories, which include accounting, business policy, debate, ethics, finance, human resources, marketing, and MIS, with the Haskayne School having won more than twice the competitions that the host school and closest rival Queen's University has won. Many notable Haskayne alumni have competed as members of its ICBC teams including Naheed Nenshi and Gary Mar.

=== Jeux du Commerce West ===
In 2011, the Haskayne School of Business sent their first-ever team to Jeux du Commerce West (JDCW), a regional business competition held in rotating host schools within Western Canada. This competition offers a wide variety of competitions ranging from sports, to debate, to academic cases and includes a major charity component. In 2011, with a half-delegation, the Business Strategy case team won second place, marking the team’s entry into the competition. In 2012, Haskayne sent a full delegation to the event, securing a total of 10 medals and third place as "Faculty of the Year."

=== Notable alumni ===
With more than 18,000 total graduates, there are a number of notable members in the Haskayne School of Business Alumni Chapter. These include a number of corporate presidents and CEOs, political commentators, and politicians:

- Garrett Camp (MBA 2002), co-founder of Uber and billionaire tech investor
- Charlie Fischer (MBA 1982), president & CEO of Nexen Inc.
- Gary Kovacs (B.Comm. 1990, MBA 1999), CEO of Mozilla Corporation
- Hal Kvisle (MBA 1981), president and CEO of TransCanada Corporation and member of the Trilateral Commission
- Ezra Levant (B.Comm. 1994), lawyer, conservative political activist, television host, and founder of the Western Standard
- Naheed Nenshi (B.Comm. 1993), mayor of Calgary
- W. Brett Wilson (MBA 1985), managing director and chairman of FirstEnergy Capital Corporation and one of the former venture capitalists on CBC's Dragons' Den
- Peter Wong (B.Comm. 1973), general manager of HSBC Group and an executive director of Hong Kong and Shanghai Banking Corporation Limited
- Russ Girling (B.Comm. 1985, MBA 1991), president and CEO of TransCanada Corporation

=== Management Alumni Excellence Award ===
Established in 2000, the Management Alumni Excellence (MAX) Award recognizes the personal successes of alumni who have made significant contributions to the Haskayne School of Business and the community at large. Thirteen alumni have been given this honour:

- 2013 - Thomas Buchanan (B.Comm. 1980)
- 2012 - Helen Wesley (B.Comm. 1991)
- 2011 - Eva Friesen (MBA 2000)
- 2010 - Mike Shaikh (B.Comm. 1977)
- 2009 - George Gosbee (B.Comm. 1993)
- 2008 - Russ Girling (B.Comm. 1985, MBA 1991)
- 2007 - Ken McKinnon KC (B.Comm. 1980)
- 2006 - David Byler (B.Comm. 1978)
- 2005 - Brian Bass(B.Comm. 1973)
- 2004 - Lesley Conway (MBA 1989)
- 2003 - W. Brett Wilson (MBA 1985)
- 2002 - Hal Kvisle (MBA 1982)
- 2001 - Charlie Fischer (MBA 1982)
- 2000 - Mike Tims (B.Comm. 1976)

== Research centres ==
- Canadian Centre for Advanced Leadership in Business
- Hunter Centre for Entrepreneurship and Innovation
- Centre for the Digital Economy (CDE)
- Centre for Public Interest Accounting (CPIA)
- Informatics Research Centre (iRC)
- Risk Studies Centre (RSC)
- International Resources Industries and Sustainability Centre (IRIS)
- Calgary Centre for Research in Finance (CCRF)
- World Tourism Education & Research Centre (WTERC)
