= Alastair Down =

Scottish oilman (1914–2014)

Colonel Sir Alastair Frederick Down OBE MC TD
- Born: 23 July 1914; Kirkcaldy, Fife
- Died: 22 October 2004 (aged 90); Sherborne, Dorset
- Education: Marlborough College, 1932
- Spouse: Maysie Hilda Mellon (m. 1947)
- Military career
- Allegiance: United Kingdom
- Branch: British Army
- Service years: 1935–1945
- Rank: Colonel
- Service number: 65170
- Units: Royal Scots; Argyll and Sutherland Highlanders; British Eighth Army; First Canadian Army
- Conflicts: World War II

Colonel Sir Alastair Frederick Down OBE MC TD (23 July 1914 – 22 October 2004) was a Scottish army officer, accountant, and oilman. He is best known for his tenure from 1975 to 1983 as chairman of Burmah Oil, which he rescued from near-bankruptcy.

== Biography ==
Alastair Frederick Down was born in Kirkcaldy, Fife on 23 July 1914 to Frederick Edward Down (1872–1956), an officer in the Indian Police, and Margaret Isobel Hutchison (1884–1962). From 1922 to 1927 he attended Edinburgh Academy, and from 1927 to 1932 attended Marlborough College. Upon graduation he took articles in accountancy, and qualified in Edinburgh in 1938. Down joined the Anglo-Iranian Oil Company in 1938 in London and was posted to Mandatory Palestine.

In 1935 Down had qualified as an officer and was commissioned into the 7th/9th Battalion, Royal Scots. After the outbreak of World War II, in 1940 Down was placed on active service, seconded to the Argyll and Sutherland Highlanders, and ordered to report to the regiment in Egypt. As he had five years of service, he became the regiment's senior subaltern. Down commanded a platoon in the Battle of Sidi Barrani in December 1940 and lost his right eye in the engagement. He was awarded a Military Cross for his actions in the battle. Following his recovery, he was posted to the general staff of the British Eighth Army in North Africa and Italy, and then transferred to the staff of the First Canadian Army in the Netherlands. He ended the war as a full colonel. In 1942 he was appointed a Member and in 1944 an Officer of the Order of the British Empire, and in 1945 was appointed a Knight of the Order of Orange-Nassau.

In 1945 he resumed working for Anglo-Iranian and was based in Iran until 1947, and then in London until 1954. Upon the creation of British Petroleum in 1954, he was sent to Canada to set up the company's subsidiary, BP Canada, in part because of his experience on the general staff in the Canadian Army. After the company became operational, from 1957 to 1962 served as its first president. In 1962 Down returned to London and obtained several senior positions with BP. From 1962 to 1975 he was managing director, and from 1969 to 1975 deputy chairman. In 1969 and 1970 he served as the president of the BP Oil Corporation, the company's American subsidiary, and negotiated its merger with Standard Oil of Ohio.

Down left British Petroleum in 1975 and was appointed chairman of Burmah Oil, which he rescued from the verge of bankruptcy. He retired as Burmah's chairman in 1983.

On 4 October 1947, Down married Maysie Hilda "Bunny" Mellon (19??–2019) at All Saints Church in Crowborough, Sussex. They had four children: Melinda, Richard, Diana, and Nigel. Down was a member of the Bath Club, York Club, Toronto Club, Mount Royal Club, and Ranchmen's Club.

He was knighted in the 1978 Birthday Honours.
