= Hudson's Bay Oil and Gas Company =

Canadian petroleum company (1926–1982)

Hudson's Bay Oil and Gas Company Limited
- Formerly: Hudson's Bay Marland Oil Company
- Traded as: TSX: HBO
- Industry: Petroleum
- Founded: 6 November 1926
- Defunct: 10 March 1982
- Fate: Acquired by Dome Petroleum
- Headquarters: Hudson's Bay Oil and Gas Building, 320 7 Avenue SW, Calgary, Alberta

Hudson's Bay Oil and Gas Company Limited was a Canadian non-integrated petroleum company that operated between 1926 and 1982. Originally called the Hudson's Bay Marland Oil Company (HBMOC), it was founded as a joint venture between the Hudson's Bay Company and the Marland Oil Company with the purpose of producing oil on land where the HBC held mineral rights. In 1929 the Continental Oil Company (Conoco) purchased Marland Oil and reformed the HBMOC as the Hudson's Bay Oil and Gas Company (HBOG). By the 1960s HBOG had become the third largest oil producer in Canada. Between 1981 and 1982, Dome Petroleum, also based in Calgary, acquired HBOG for $4 billion in what was then the most expensive takeover in Canadian history. The purchase by Dome ultimately contributed to its own demise in 1988, at which time it was acquired by Amoco Canada.

== History ==
=== Partnership with Marland ===
The Hudson's Bay Company, founded in 1670, is one of Canada's oldest businesses and played a major part in the country's development. By means of the original charter Charles II granted it, the HBC gained full possession of Rupert's Land, a territory stretching from the Rocky Mountains to the Great Lakes. The HBC sold Rupert's Land in 1870 to the Dominion of Canada, which had been formed in 1867, for $1.5 million. However, it retained title to 7.5 million acres, or five percent of the territory. After 1870 Hudson's Bay continued to sell its land (including mineral rights) to settlers, however, after 1889 it began retaining the mineral rights. Between 1909 and 1925 these rights were disputed in British courts, and the result was the HBC was deemed to hold all mineral rights excluding precious metals.

The HBC's entrance into the oil and gas industry was initiated by the American oilman Ernest Whitworth Marland (1874–1941). Marland had made a fortune in the oil business in Pennsylvania in the early 1900s, and after losing much of his wealth in 1907, made a second fortune in Oklahoma during the 1910s and 1920s. Although Marland never visited Canada during his lifetime, he kept abreast of the country's oil industry and was intrigued by the developments in Alberta's Turner Valley. During a 1926 trip to London, Marland met with the Hudson's Bay Company governor Charles Vincent Sale (1868–1943) and proposed a new venture to develop oil reserves on Hudson's Bay land. The proposal saw that Marland would have a 25-year option to lease any Hudson's Bay land, and in return would pay a royalty to the HBC on any oil or gas that he produced. Sale and Marland agreed to the proposal and each contributed $100,000 to the new company, named the Hudson's Bay Marland Oil Company Limited. At the time of the new company's formation, the Hudson's Bay Company held the mineral rights to around 4.5 million acres across Alberta, Manitoba, and Saskatchewan.

The original Hudson's Bay Marland Oil Company was mostly unsuccessful. Exploration was concentrated in the Rocky Mountain Foothills and failed to yield any discoveries.

=== Reorganization under Continental Oil ===
In 1928, E. W. Marland lost both Marland Oil Company and the Hudson's Bay Marland Oil Company to J. P. Morgan & Co. In 1929 both companies fell under the control of the Continental Oil Company (Conoco), which was also controlled by Morgan. Continental then reformed HBMOC as the Hudson's Bay Oil and Gas Company. The new company was incorporated on 5 October 1929. Through a new agreement between Continental and Hudson's Bay, the HBC would retain the option to purchase a 25 percent share in the company.

Between 1929 and 1933, the new company spent $1.9 million on exploration and failed to make any discoveries. In 1934 its Keho No. 1 well came up dry after 31 months of drilling. That same year, HBOG signed a ten-year agreement with Imperial Oil that allowed the latter to drill on Hudson's Bay land. In 1939 Imperial jointly drilled nine wells with HBOG in Turner Valley, and by 1947 HBOG's share of the production came to around 10 million barrels. After the Leduc No. 1 discovery in 1947, Conoco revived its activity with HBOG and began actively exploring again in Canada. The massive land holdings of the Hudson's Bay meant that whenever there was a major oil discovery, the HBC likely owned nearby land that could be explored. In 1952 the Hudson's Bay Company finally exercised its right to purchase a 25 percent share in HBOG. It was not until 1956 that HBOG earned its first profit. The company remained private until 1957, when Conoco made a public offering of 9.3 percent of its shares for $19.2 million.

HBOG soon established itself as one of Canada's major oil and gas companies. In the mid-1950s it became one of the guarantors of Trans-Canada Pipe Line. In conjunction with Amoco Canada it produced oil in the Pembina field. HBOG's largest discovery came in 1962 when it struck gas at Kaybob South. Kaybob became Canada's largest gas field with reserves of 2.3 trillion cubic feet of sour gas. It also held gas interests at Zama Lake, Brazeau, and Sundre. By 1980s HBOG was the country's eighth largest oil producer, fifth largest gas producer, and seventh largest combined. In 1955 HBOG opened Canada's third oil pipeline, the Rangeland Pipeline, which connected with Conoco's Glacier Pipeline in Montana. During the 1970s HBOG explored for petroleum in Australia, Indonesia, and the North Sea.

In 1955 the company opened its new office building, the Hudson's Bay Oil and Gas Building, in Calgary at 326 7 Avenue SW. The ten-storey tower was designed by Stevenson and Dewar. In 1976 it moved its offices to the ninth floor of the new Scotia Centre at 700 2 Street SW. The company's logo, a stylised H in the shape of an oil drop, was created in 1967 by graphic designer Chris Yaneff.

=== Takeover by Dome ===
The hostile takeover of Hudson's Bay Oil and Gas by Dome Petroleum occurred in the context of the new National Energy Program (NEP) that the Liberal federal government introduced in October 1980. Among others, the program's purpose was the "Canadianization of the oil industry and the achievement of energy self-sufficiency through conservation, more determined development of Canada's frontiers, and the building of new tar sands plants." Additionally, the NEP "linked government exploration incentives with Canadian company ownership." To work around the NEP, Dome Petroleum, which at the time was 65 percent foreign owned, created a new Canadian subsidiary called Dome Canada Limited to carry out its exploration work. This company launched officially on 30 January 1981 with assets of $842 million. Almost immediately, Dome president William E. Richards (1926–2008) set out to acquire HBOG, hoping to increase Dome Canada's cash flow. At the time, HBOG's majority shareholder was Conoco, who held a 52.9 percent stake. Dome conceived a plan whereby it would purchase a large stake in Conoco, threatening its independence, and then exchange this stake for Conoco's holdings in HBOG. On 5 May 1981, Dome made a public offer of $65 per share for 13 to 20 percent stake in Conoco (which was then trading at $50), and ended up purchasing 22 million shares for US $1.43 billion, or a 20 percent stake. On Sunday, 31 May at Conoco's head office in Stamford, Connecticut, Dome negotiated a deal for the return of its 20 percent stake of Conoco. Per the deal, Dome would give back all 22 million shares plus $245 million in cash in return for the 52.9 percent holdings of HBOG.

In the fall of 1981, Dome set out to acquire the remaining holdings of Dome. The largest remaining block belonged to the Hudson's Bay Company, who held 10.1 percent. On 3 November at the King Edward Hotel in Toronto, Dome came to an agreement with Hudson's Bay to acquire the outstanding shares for $2.3 billion, bringing the total cost of the takeover to around $4 billion. The deal was approved by shareholders in January 1982 and HBOG was amalgamated with Dome officially on 10 March.

Dome's takeover of HBOG contributed to its spiraling debt, which reach $8 billion by the end of 1982. Other factors that contributed to its financial difficulties were the closure of a tax loophole vital to the HBOG takeover, rising interest rates, and an influx of foreign oil into eastern Canada. Dome's debt spawned one of Canada's largest financial crises, as it had also received substantial loans from four of Canada's big five banks.

Hudson's Bay Oil and Gas's final president, Richard Haskayne, reflected later on the takeover:

Certainly nobody won in the Dome takeover. [...] And Canada lost a potential Northern Tiger. I don't see any Canadian Companies around today that could have exceeded HBOG, with our combination of an enormous land base, the auspicious discoveries we were making in Australia and Indonesia, and the disciplined people who went on to operate other petroleum giants. We should have been the ones taking over Dome. But because of the supercharged, overvalued performance of its shares, the stock markets wouldn't allow us to do that. Dome was trading at high multiples based merely on utter hype Jack [Gallagher] and Bill [Richards] had built up around their unproven Beaufort Sea holdings. Simply far better at promoting themselves than we were with HBOG, and supported by a fawning federal government, they stickhandled us out of existence.

In September 1988, Amoco Canada purchased Dome Petroleum Limited for $5.5 billion, thus gaining control of the former HBOG assets. HBOG was finally deregistered on 1 May 1989. BP Canada purchased Amoco Canada in 1998.

== Leadership ==
=== President ===
1. Leonard Franklin McCollum, 1947–1953
2. Ruby Clifford Brown, 1953–1959
3. Gerald Thomas Pearson, 1959–1962
4. Wayne Edward Glenn, 1962–1965
5. Linden Jay Richards, 1965–1970
6. David Carlton Jones, 1970–1977
7. Stanley Granville Olson, 1977–1980
8. Richard Francis Haskayne, 1980–1982

=== Chairman of the Board ===
1. Leonard Franklin McCollum, 1953–1961
2. Charles August Perlitz Jr., 1961–1964
3. Ira Higgins Cram, 1964–1966
4. Andrew Wilson Tarkington, 1966–1972
5. Wayne Edward Glenn, 1972–1977
6. David Carlton Jones, 1977
7. Dr John Edwin Kircher, 1977–1980
8. Gerald James Maier, 1980–1982
