= Nova Chemicals =

Canadian petrochemical company

NOVA Chemicals Corporation
- Type: Private
- Industry: Petrochemical industry
- Founded: 8 April 1954; 72 years ago
- Headquarters: Calgary, Alberta, Canada
- Key people: Roger Kearns (CEO, April 2023)
- Products: Ethylene, Polyethylene, Chemical and Energy Co-Products
- Revenue: ▲US$3.512 billion (2016)
- Number of employees: 2,500 (2022)
- Parent: Mubadala
- Website: www.novachem.com

NOVA Chemicals Corporation is a Canadian petrochemical company that has been in operation since 1954. NOVA was formed as provincial crown corporation called the Alberta Gas Trunk Line Company Limited to manage Alberta's natural gas collection system. During the 1970s, the company diversified into petroleum exploration and production, manufacturing, and petrochemicals. In 1980 the AGTL was renamed NOVA, An Alberta Corporation. After a decade of financial struggles, in 1998 NOVA sold its petroleum and pipeline business to TransCanada Pipelines and continued as solely a petrochemicals operation. The gas collection system run by TransCanada is now called the NOVA Gas Transmission Line.

NOVA Chemicals' products are used in a wide variety of applications, including food and electronics packaging, industrial materials, appliances and a variety of consumer goods. The company operates two business units and holds a 50% interest in a major joint venture with INEOS, called INEOS NOVA. NOVA has not held interest in INEOS since 2010, when they sold their 50% stake in the joint venture to INEOS.

== Company history ==
In 1954, the Alberta legislature under Ernest Manning passed the Alberta Gas Trunk Line Company Act, creating the Alberta Gas Trunk Line Company (AGTL) Crown Corporation, with a monopoly on natural gas transportation (pipelines) within the province. Construction began in 1956 and gas began flowing in 1957. In the 1970s, AGTL expanded into the chemicals industry. The company was privatized in 1961 and was renamed NOVA, An Alberta Corporation in 1980, and again, to Nova Corporation of Alberta in 1986. By 1989 was considered a "petrochemical and pipeline giant."

NOVA Corporation of Alberta was renamed Nova Corporation in 1994. In 1998, NOVA Corporation split in two, with its pipeline business (with $11 billion in annual sales) merging with TransCanada Pipelines and its chemicals business ($2.4 billion sales) becoming a publicly traded company, NOVA Chemicals. Shortly after the split, then-CEO Jeffrey Lipton moved NOVA Chemicals' head office from Calgary to Pittsburgh, Pennsylvania. While this move was made in order to be closer to US customers, the benefits of the move never materialized. It was also seen as a snub to the province of Alberta, as Premier Ed Stelmach refused to grant NOVA Chemicals a bailout in 2009 due to the financial meltdown and recession, as well as the company's heavy debt load.

On July 6, 2009, the International Petroleum Investment Company (since 2016 IPIC merged with Mubadala), which is wholly owned by the government of the Emirate of Abu Dhabi, completed the 100% purchase of NOVA Chemicals, and transferred its place of incorporation to the Province of New Brunswick.

In the United States, NOVA Chemicals has focused recent expansion in the Gulf Coast area. This includes acquiring an olefins plant that produces roughly 1.95 billion pounds of ethylene annually in Geismar, Louisiana, which was purchased from Williams Partners. In December 2022, the company completed construction of a new polyethylene plant in St. Clair Township.

In June 2024, the US Food and Drug Administration (FDA) provided a Letter of Non Objection confirming the capability of NOVA Chemicals's mechanical recycling process in Connersville.

=== Acquisitions ===
In the 1980s, NOVA had controlling ownership of Calgary-based Husky Oil. NOVA sold the last of its stake in Husky in 1991. In 1988, NOVA acquired, Polysar Energy & Chemical Corporation (formerly Aquitaine Company of Canada Ltd.) from the Canadian Development Corporation.

== Operations ==
=== The Olefins/Polyolefins ===
The Olefins/Polyolefins business unit produces and sells ethylene, PE resins and co-products from its two manufacturing centers located in Alberta and Ontario, Canada.

The Olefins/Polyolefins business unit contains three reporting segments:

- Joffre Olefins, which produces and sells ethylene and co-products and includes the Joffre, Alberta, site's three ethylene crackers.
- Corunna Olefins, which produces and sells ethylene and co-products and includes the Corunna, Ontario, ethylene flexi-cracker.
- Polyethylene, which produces and sells PE and includes both the Alberta and Ontario based PE assets. In addition, the Polyethylene segment licenses its proprietary process technology and catalysts.

== Leadership ==
=== President ===
- Ralph F. Will, 1954–1956
- Vernon Taylor, 1956–1958
- Alex G. Bailey, 1958–1966
- James C. Mahaffy, 1966–1970
- S. Robert Blair, 1970–1986
- Robert L. Pierce, 1986–1988
- James H. Butler, 1988–1990
- J. Edward Newall, 1991–1998
- Jeffrey M. Lipton, 1998–2008
- Christopher D. Pappas, 2008–2009
- Randy G. Woelfel, 2009–2014
- Todd D. Karran, 2015–2020
- Luis M. Sierra, 2020–2022
- Danny Dweik, 2022–2023
- Roger L. Kearns, 2023–

=== Chairman of the Board ===
- Robert J. Dinning, 1955–1963
- John C. Mayne, 1966–1974
- H. J. Sanders Pearson, 1974–1985
- S. Robert Blair, 1985–1991
- Daryl K. Seaman, 1991–1992
- Richard F. Haskayne, 1992–1998
- J. Edward Newall, 1998–2007
- James M. Stanford, 2007–2009
- Khadem A. al-Qubaisi, 2009–2015
- Suhail M. Al Mazrouei, 2015–2020
- Musabbeh Al Kaabi, 2020–2021
- Ahmed Yahia Al Idrissi, 2021–
