= Bow Valley Industries =

Canadian energy company (1962–1995)

- Formerly: Hi-Tower Drilling
- Founded: 1 May 1962
- Defunct: 1 October 1995
- Fate: Acquired by Talisman Energy
- Headquarters: Bradie Building, Calgary, Alberta

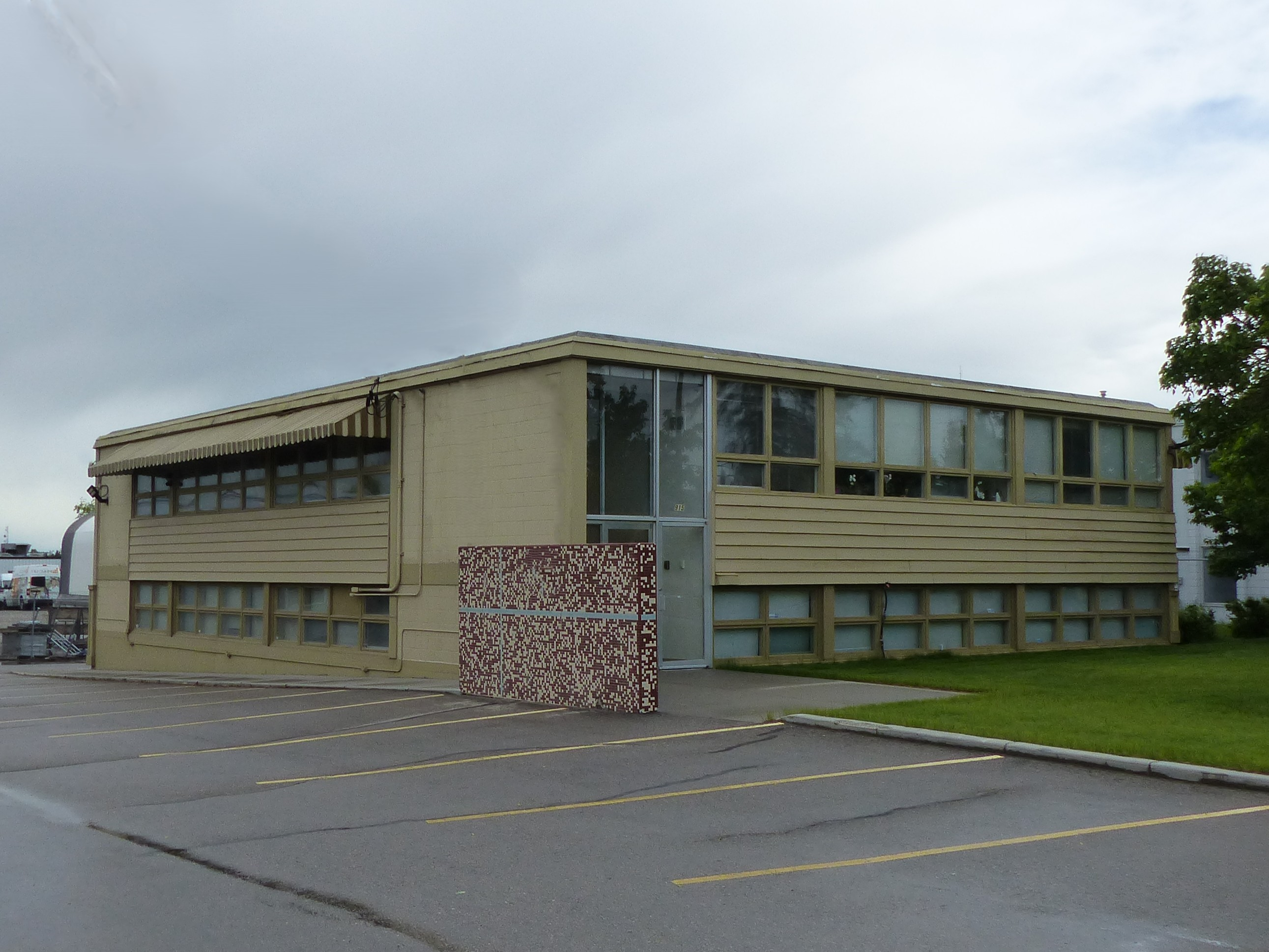
The 1959 headquarters at 915 42 Avenue SE in Calgary, designed by Leslie E. Baker

Bow Valley Industries Ltd. was a Canadian energy company that existed from 1962 to 1995. Bow Valley grew to become one of Canada's largest oil and gas producers. It had significant reserves in Canada, the North Sea, and Indonesia. Bow Valley, which was one of a small number of Canadian concerns to participate in the development of the North Sea, had a significant share in the Brae oilfield. In 1987, British Gas acquired a majority stake in the company and made a major investment in its growth. The company was renamed Bow Valley Energy Inc. in May 1993. In March 1994, British Gas announced its 53 per cent share in the company was for sale. In May of that year, Talisman Energy, also of Calgary, agreed to purchase the shares from British Gas, and then that summer acquired the remaining minority shares in the company. Bow Valley's operations were integrated into Talisman's through late 1994 and early 1995, and the company was dissolved in October 1995.

== Leadership ==
=== President ===
1. Daryl Kenneth Seaman, 1 May 1962 – 28 September 1976
2. John Richard Harris, 28 September 1976 – 28 February 1981
3. Gerald James Maier, 5 April 1982 – 4 September 1985
4. Daryl Kenneth Seaman, 4 September 1985 – 31 December 1987
5. William Howard Tye, 1 January 1988 – August 1990
6. Jerry Raymond Wright, August 1990 – 14 September 1992
7. Robert George Welty, 28 September 1992 – August 1994

=== Chairman of the Board ===
1. Daryl Kenneth Seaman, 28 September 1976 – 5 May 1992
