= Hal Kvisle =

Canadian businessman (born 1952)

- Born: 20 October 1952 (age 72); Innisfail, Alberta
- Education: University of Alberta (BSc '75); University of Calgary (MBA '82)

Harold Norman "Hal" Kvisle (born 20 October 1952) is a Canadian engineer and oilman who is chairman of the board of ARC Resources and the South Bow Corporation. Kvisle began his career in 1975 with Dome Petroleum and participated in the company's arctic exploration programme. After Dome was acquired by Amoco Canada in 1988, in 1990 Kvisle was appointed president of Fletcher Challenge Energy Canada, the Canadian subsidiary of Fletcher Challenge. In 1999, he joined TransCanada Corporation, and in 2001 was appointed president of the company. Kvisle retired as president in 2010, but two years later became president of Talisman Energy. He remained in this role until the sale of the company in 2015 to Repsol. In 2016 he was elected chairman of ARC, and in 2023 was elected chairman of the new South Bow Corporation, which was spun off from TransCanada.

== Career ==
Kvisle was born on 20 October 1952 in Innisfail, Alberta to Nils Halvorsen Kvisle (1908–1994) and Doris Throndson (d. 2011). Kvisle received a bachelor of science in engineering with distinction from the University of Alberta in 1975 and an MBA from the University of Calgary in 1982.

Kvisle joined Dome Petroleum in 1975 and eventually became finance manager. He played a key role in the sale of Dome Petroleum to Amoco Canada in 1987 and 1988. In 1988, he moved to Fletcher Challenge Energy, eventually becoming chief operating officer for South and Central America and president of Canadian operations.

In 1999, Kvisle was recruited by TransCanada PipeLines to be its executive vice-president in trading and business development. In 2001, he was appointed president and chief executive officer. TransCanada Pipelines announced in April 2010 that Kvisle would retire at the end of June 2010; he was replaced by chief operating officer Russ Girling.

Hal was appointed as chief executive officer of Talisman Energy in September 2012, taking over from John Manzoni, until February 2015 when Talisman was bought out by Repsol.

Kvisle is former chairman of the Interstate Natural Gas Association of America and is former chair of the Mount Royal College board of governors. As of 2015, he is currently a member of the board of directors of the Bank of Montreal, Talisman Energy Inc., Arc Resources and the Nature Conservancy of Canada. He is also a member of the Trilateral Commission.

== Personal life ==
Kvisle is married and has three children.

Business positions
Preceded by Doug Baldwin	Chief Executive, TransCanada Pipelines; 2001–2010	Succeeded by Russ Girling
Preceded by John Manzoni	Chief Executive Officer, Talisman Energy; 2012–2015	Company bought out
