= Gerald Maier =

Canadian engineer and oilman (1928–2025)

- Born: 22 September 1928; Regina, Saskatchewan, Canada
- Died: 4 November 2025 (aged 97); Calgary, Alberta, Canada
- Education: University of Alberta (BSc '51)
- Spouse: Mary Isobel Grant (m. 1952; died 2003)

Gerald James Maier OC (22 September 1928 – 4 November 2025) was a Canadian engineer and oilman. Maier began his career in 1951 with the Sun Oil Company, and then in 1953 joined the Hudson's Bay Oil and Gas Company. At Hudson's Bay, Maier rose through the ranks to become a senior vice-president in 1975 and an executive vice-president in 1977. He was elected chairman of the board in 1980 and remained in that role until the company's sale to Dome Petroleum in 1982. That year, he became president of Bow Valley Industries. Maier left Bow Valley to become president of TransCanada Pipelines in 1985. In 1991, he was elected chairman of the board additionally, and in 1993 ceded the presidency. Maier retired as chairman of TransCanada in 1998.

== Life and career ==
Maier was born and raised in Wilcox, Saskatchewan. He attended the Athol Murray College of Notre Dame and then the University of Alberta. He has been chairman of the board of regents of his high school since 1997.

In 2003, he was made an Officer of the Order of Canada as "a recognized leader in the exploration, acquisition and sustainable development of our natural gas and crude oil reserves". Maier was also awarded the Canadian Engineering Leader Award, presented by the University of Calgary's Schulich School of Engineering. Maier was a member of the board of directors for the Calgary bid committee for the 1988 Winter Olympics.

Maier died on 4 November 2025, at the age of 97.

== Sources ==
- "Canadian Who's Who 1997 entry". University of Toronto Press.
