= BP Canada =

Canadian petroleum company (1955–1992)

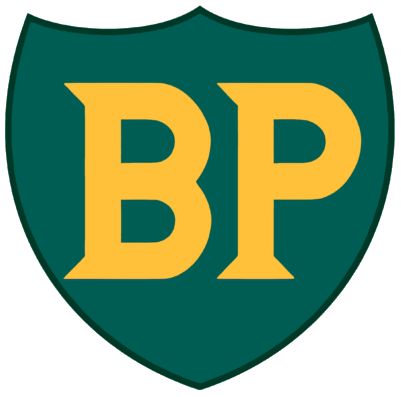
- Industry: Petroleum
- Founded: 15 June 1955
- Defunct: 31 December 1992
- Successor: Talisman Energy
- Headquarters: Montreal (1955–1980); Toronto (1980–1982); Calgary (1982–1992)
- Parent: British Petroleum
- Website: bp.com/canada

BP Canada was a Canadian petroleum company and subsidiary of British Petroleum that existed between 1955 and 1992. The name refers to a group of companies that engaged in various segments of the petroleum industry lifecycle. BP entered the Canadian market in October 1953, when it purchased a 23 percent stake in the Triad Oil Company. In 1955, BP formed a Canadian subsidiary, based in Montreal, called BP Canada Limited. The company began acquiring retail stations in Ontario and Quebec and in 1957 started construction on a refinery in Montreal. By the end of the 1950s BP Canada was a fully-integrated operation. In 1964, it acquired from Cities Service the Oakville Refinery, and then expanded its operations significantly in 1971 when it acquired Supertest Petroleum.

In 1982, BP sold its refining and marketing assets for $577 million to the crown corporation Petro-Canada. The remaining upstream operations were organised into an exploration and production company. The company struggled for much of the 1980s, and by the early 1990s the parent looked to sell off its stake. In June 1992, British Petroleum sold its 57 percent stake in the company, and on 1 January 1993, the newly independent company was renamed Talisman Energy.

British Petroleum was absent from Canada from 1992 until its merger with Amoco in late 1998, at which time the Amoco Canada Petroleum Company became part of the BP group. Amoco Canada was renamed BP Canada Energy in August 2000, however, this company is unrelated to the original BP Canada.

== History ==
=== Early investments in Canada, 1952–1955 ===
British Petroleum's activities in Canada began in the aftermath of the nationalization of the Iranian oil industry in 1951. As a result of a bill passed in March of the year, the Anglo-Iranian Oil Company – British Petroleum's predecessor – was forced to sell its assets in Iran to the government. The sale of Anglo-Iranian's assets in Iran gave the company a large amount of money to invest in new markets. Anglo-Iranian made its first fact-finding mission to Canada in 1952. On 20 August, a group of officials led by Peter Cox from D'Arcy Exploration, a subsidiary company, arrived in Edmonton to meet with N. Eldon Tanner, the Alberta government's Minister of Mines and Minerals. A year later, in October 1953, Anglo-Iranian announced its intention to invest, via D'Arcy Exploration, $5 million in a 23 percent stake of the Calgary-based Triad Oil Company. The terms of the purchase also included an option to acquire 50 percent or more of the company before the end of 1955; it executed this option in late 1954. Anglo-Iranian was also granted two seats on the Triad board and began supplying the company with technical staff. By the spring of 1955, Anglo-Iranian's investment in Triad was around $19.5 million.

=== Formation and development of BP Canada, 1955–1969 ===
On 16 December 1954, the Anglo-Iranian Oil Company changed its name to British Petroleum. The British Petroleum name entered Canada on 15 June 1955, when it incorporated the subsidiary BP Canada Limited under a federal charter. By early 1957 the company had begun operations. In February of that year, BP Canada announced a $60 million plan to construct a 30,000 barrels-per-day refinery in Montreal and develop a chain of retail outlets in Quebec and Ontario. In March, the company acquired its first 50 service stations in Quebec from the Lake St John Distributing Company and converted them to BP branding. At the same time, BP Canada contracted Christian Dior to design the uniforms for its female service station attendants. However, after Dior's death in October 1957, it had to find a new designer. In April 1958, the company announced its entry into the Ontario market with the purchase of six retail stations in the Ottawa area. By the end of 1958, BP Canada had around 400 stations in Quebec and 100 in Ontario. In 1957, a holding company called the British Petroleum Company of Canada Limited was incorporated. All of BP's Canadian assets, including D'Arcy Exploration's 50 percent stake in Triad Oil, were transferred to it. On 8 October 1958, BP Refinery Canada Limited was incorporated to manage the Montreal refinery that was under construction. H. L. Ray was sent from London to act as the new company's general manager.

BP Canada's first president was Sir Alastair Frederick Down MC OBE (1914–2004), who had begun working for Anglo-Iranian in 1938. Down remained at the helm until he was recalled to London in 1962 to serve as BP's managing director. His successor as president was Ralph Norman Tottenham-Smith, the son of British diplomat Ralph Henry Tottenham-Smith. In April 1957, Graham Ford Towers CMG (1897–1975) was invited to become BP Canada's first chairman. Towers had previously served as the first Governor of the Bank of Canada, and had left that position in 1954. In 1966, Tottenham-Smith stepped down as president. The board appointed Derek Fenton Mitchell (1918–1981) as his replacement.

The company's first offices were established at 550 Sherbrooke Street West. In 1962 it relocated to the new Standard Life Building at 1245 Sherbrooke Street West. BP Canada made its largest purchase to date in 1964, when it acquired the refining and marketing assets of Canada-Cities Service Limited for $50 million. The purchase included 750 gas stations, 75 bulk plants, and the Oakville Refinery, which had been built in 1958.

=== Integrated major, 1969–1982 ===
In 1969 Towers retired as chairman and the board elected Robert MacLaren Fowler (1906–1980) as his replacement. That same year, the company underwent a restructuring. The holding company, the British Petroleum Company of Canada Limited, was renamed BP Canada (1969) Limited. The marketing arm, BP Canada Limited, was renamed BP Oil Limited, and BP Refinery Canada Limited was placed under it as a subsidiary. Triad Oil Company, of which BP Canada now had a 65.9 percent stake, was renamed BP Oil and Gas Limited.

The August 1969 discovery of the Prudhoe Bay Oil Field inspired British Petroleum to increase its investments in North America. In August 1971, BP Canada made an offer to purchase Supertest Petroleum. To undertake the acquisition, BP Canada Limited (the holding company) exchanged all shares of its subsidiary companies for an 83.7 percent stake in Supertest, which was held by Corlon Investments Limited. Supertest was then renamed BP Canada Limited, while the holding company became BP Canadian Holdings Limited. BP Holdings then increased its stake in BP Canada (or Supertest) to 97.8 percent at a share price of $16.50.

In 1970, BP Canada held rights to 26.7 million acres, up from 19.3 the previous year. Its recent growth included significant holdings in the arctic. In 1971, the company drilled wells on Prince Patrick Island and Graham Island as part of the Panarctic Oils consortium. In 1972, oil and gas production was 22,132 barrels-per-day, up from 18,582 the previous year. The 1973 oil crisis instigated by OPEC created havoc in global oil markets, however, in 1974 BP Canada increased its profits by 82 percent. In 1975 the company completed a 40,000 barrels-per-day expansion of the Oakville Refinery and completed the takeover of British Columbia Oil Sands Limited. That same year, the company sold 1,200 of its 3,000 retail outlets in Ontario and Quebec. Also in 1975, BP Canada began offshore exploration in Newfoundland. In the face of the 1979 oil crisis, that year, BP Canada posted profits of 63.1 million, an increase of 93 percent from the previous year.

In 1977, Fowler stepped down as chairman and was replaced by Mitchell. The board appointed Robert Walter Dawson Hanbidge (1925–2002) as the new president. In 1980, the year of the Quebec independence referendum, the company announced that it would relocated its offices from Montreal to Toronto. Its new headquarters were established in First Canadian Place. On 29 October 1981, Mitchell died unexpectedly. His replacement was Robert Wilson Adam (1923–1993), the deputy chairman of British Petroleum.

=== Independent company, 1982–1992 ===
In October 1982, rumors began to circulate about the possibility of Petro-Canada or the Caisse de dépôt et placement du Québec purchasing BP Canada. By the beginning of November, BP reached an agreement to sell all its downstream assets to Petro-Canada for $577 million. This included 1,640 retail stations in Ontario and Quebec, the Oakville Refinery, and $180 million of oil stored in the refinery. To execute the deal, BP Canada was reorganised into two parts. Downstream assets were consolidated into a company called BP Refining and Marketing Limited, which Petro-Canada purchased for $16.10 a share. Upstream assets were consolidated in a company called BP Resources Canada Limited, which would continue. On 1 February 1983 the Supreme Court of Ontario approved the deal, and the purchase was finalised on 11 March.

BP Canada had thus become an independent exploration and production company. The head offices in Toronto were closed and the executive functions moved to BP House in Calgary, which had been the home of the company's western operations. Following the sale, Hanbidge retired on 1 May and was replaced as president by Maurice Anthony Kirkby (1929–). In 1984, Donald Southam Harvie (1924–2001), the son of Eric Harvie, was elected chairman. On 27 April 1984, BP Resources Canada changed its name to BP Canada Inc., the name of the company prior to the Petro-Canada sale. BP Canada's performance fluctuated through the 1980s. In 1987 its profits were a record $44.6 million, yet, the following year they decreased to $10.3 million. David A. Claydon replaced Kirkby as president in 1988, but stepped down in 1991 to assume the chairmanship upon Harvie's retirement. BP Canada's final president was Dr James William Buckee (1946–), who was appointed in 1991. Between 1990 and 1992, BP Canada cut its staff in half to 380.

=== Exit of British Petroleum, creation of Talisman Energy, 1992–1993 ===
In 1991, British Petroleum was suffering from mounting debt and losses. In 1992 it announced its intention to sell its 57 percent stake in BP Canada for $374 million. The sale was completed in June of that year and, subsequently, necessitated a name change for the former subsidiary. A competition was held to choose name. The winning entry was that of Janet Pritchard, a petroleum engineering clerk, who came up with "Talisman Energy." On 1 January 1993, the new name came into being and BP Canada ceased to exist. Claydon and Buckee stayed on as chairman and president, however, Claydon stepped down in early 1993. Over the next two decades, Talisman was a highly successful company. At the end of 2015 it was purchased by Repsol and renamed Repsol Oil and Gas Canada.

=== Return of British Petroleum, 1998–present ===
After six years of absence, British Petroleum returned to Canada when on 31 December 1998 it completed its $53 billion merger with Amoco. The merger gave BP control of the Amoco Canada Petroleum Company, which had been in existence since 1969. In August 2000, Amoco Canada was renamed BP Canada Energy Company. As of 2012, following the divestment of its natural gas and natural gas liquids businesses, current BP operations in Canada focus on oil sands, including joint ventures with companies including Husky Energy and Devon Energy. It has activities in Alberta, the Northwest Territories, and offshore in Nova Scotia and the Canadian Beaufort Sea, and as of 2012 employed more than 450 employees.

In 1998–2000, the operations of Amoco, ARCO and Castrol were amalgamated. Into the 2000s, BP Canada operated primarily as a producer of natural gas and employed more than 2000 employees.

The company partnered with Imperial Oil beginning in 2010, to carry out exploration of two of its offshore oil and gas blocks in the Beaufort Sea. During 2010 and 2011, BP Canada sold its natural gas operations as part of divestments following the Deepwater Horizon oil spill. It sold its natural gas business in Alberta and British Columbia to Apache Corporation in July 2010 and its Canadian natural gas liquids business to a subsidiary of Plains All American Pipeline in December 2011.

The company operates primarily in Alberta, the Northwest Territories, and Nova Scotia. As of 2012, BP Canada has approximately 450 employees. It purchases crude oil for the company's refineries in the US, has oil sands holdings in Alberta and four offshore blocks in the Beaufort Sea and Nova Scotia. The company's oil sands leases include joint ventures with Husky Energy in the Sunrise Energy Project (50%), and Devon Energy in Pike, and a partnership with Value Creation Inc. in the development of the Terre de Grace oil sands lease. The Sunrise oil sands project entered the development phase in 2012. As of 2012, the Pike project, was in the regulatory approval phase, and the Terre de Grace project was in the resource appraisal phase.

== Corporate structure ==
=== Integrated: 1955–1982 ===
Holdings
incorporated 26 March 1957: British Petroleum Company of Canada Limited
renamed in 1969: BP Canada (1969) Limited
renamed in 1970: BP Canada Limited
renamed in 1971: BP Canadian Holdings Limited

Operations (acquired 1971)
incorporated 17 December 1925: Supertest Petroleum Corporation Limited
renamed in 1971: BP Canada Limited
renamed in 1979: BP Canada Inc.

Marketing
incorporated 15 June 1955: BP Canada Limited
renamed in 1969: BP Oil Limited

Refining
incorporated 8 October 1958: BP Refinery Canada Limited

Exploration and production
incorporated December 1951: Triad Oil Company Limited
renamed in 1969: BP Oil and Gas Limited
merged into BP Canada Limited in 1972

=== Independent: 1982–1992 ===
BP Canadian Holdings Limited – dissolved in 1982

BP Canada Inc. – reorganised in 1982 into:

BP Refining and Marketing Canada Limited

sold to Petro-Canada in 1983

BP Resources Canada Limited

renamed BP Canada Inc. in 1984
became Talisman Energy in 1993

== Leadership ==
=== President ===
1. Sir Alastair Frederick Down MC OBE, 1957–1962
2. Ralph Norman Tottenham-Smith, 1962–1966
3. Derek Fenton Mitchell, 1966–1977
4. Robert Walter Dawson Hanbidge, 1977–1983
5. Maurice Anthony Kirkby, 1983–1988
6. David Anthony Claydon, 1988–1991
7. Dr James William Buckee, 1991–1992

=== Chairman of the Board ===
1. Graham Ford Towers CMG, 1957–1969
2. Robert MacLaren Fowler, 1969–1977
3. Derek Fenton Mitchell, 1977–1981
4. Robert Wilson Adam, 1981–1982
5. Roy Frederick Bennett, 1982–1984
6. Donald Southam Harvie, 1984–1991
7. David Anthony Claydon, 1991–1992
