= Russ Girling =

Canadian businessman

- Born: 23 June 1962 (age 63); Calgary, Alberta
- Education: University of Calgary (BCom '85, MBA '90)
- Spouse: Glenda Beryl Ondfriechuk (m. 1985)

Russell Keith Girling (born 23 June 1962) is a Canadian oilman who since March 2024 has been chairman of Suncor Energy. Girling served from 2010 to 2021 as president of TransCanada Corporation.

== Early life ==
Girling graduated from the University of Calgary, where he earned a Bachelor of Commerce degree and a Master of Business Administration in Finance.

== Career ==
Girling worked for Suncor, Northridge Petroleum Marketing and Dome Petroleum.

Girling joined the TransCanada Corporation in 1994 and became its executive vice-president in 1995, subsequently creating the subsidiary TransCanada Power. In 2001 he became the president of TransCanada Gas Services. He subsequently served as the executive vice-president of corporate development and chief financial officer of TransCanada, until he became the president of pipelines of TransCanada Corporation. In this capacity, he oversaw gas and oil pipelines in Canada, the U.S. and Mexico. He was later promoted to chief operating officer. Since July 1, 2010, he has served as the president and chief executive officer of the TransCanada Corporation.

Girling serves on, and is chairman of, the board of directors of Nutrien Limited He is the former chairman and chief executive officer of TC PipeLines GP. He is also the former chairman of the Interstate Natural Gas Association of America (INGAA) and the Natural Gas Council (NGC). Additionally, he formerly served on the board of directors of Bruce Power and the Canadian Energy Pipeline Association.

Girling was a member of the 2010 United Way of Calgary and Area Cabinet. In 2008 he was the recipient of the Haskayne School of Business Management Alumni Excellence (MAX) Award. He serves on the board of directors of the Willow Park Charity Golf Classic.

In 2018, as CEO of TC Energy Corporation, Girling placed 4th out of 100 of the top earners in Calgary with a total compensation of $12,502,397.

In 2020, Girling announced he would be retiring from his position as the CEO of TC Energy. He spent 26 years at the company, 10 as the Chief Executive Officer. He was succeeded by François Poirier in January 2021.
