= Jack Gallagher (oilman) =

Canadian businessman (1916–1998)

- Born: 16 July 1916; Winnipeg, Manitoba
- Died: 16 December 1998 (aged 82); Calgary, Alberta
- Education: University of Manitoba (BSc '37)
- Spouse: Kathleen Marjorie Stewart (m. 1949)

John Edward Patrick Gallagher OC (16 July 1916 – 16 December 1998) was a Canadian oilman who from 1950 to 1983 was the head of Dome Petroleum. Gallagher is best remembered for leading extensive explorations in the Beaufort Sea in the late 1970s.

== Biography ==
=== Early years and university ===
Jack Gallagher was born in Winnipeg on 16 July 1916. In 1933 he graduated from St. John's High School. In the fall of 1933 Gallagher entered the University of Manitoba, studying engineering. Fearful about his prospects of getting a job in construction during the Great Depression, he later transferred to studying geology. During the summer of 1936, Gallagher worked for the Geological Survey of Canada in northern Manitoba. This first encounter with the north would inspire his return there later in his career.

=== Career beginnings ===
Upon graduating in 1937, Gallagher hitched a ride to Washington state and got a job selling Caterpillar tractors. After a year, Gallagher moved to California, where he got a job as a scout with the Shell Oil Company. Despite not having experience in oil and gas, the company was interested in his field experience in the North. In January 1939 Shell sent Gallagher to Egypt. When the Second World War began in September of that year, Shell ceased its Egyptian operations and moved to the Dutch East Indies. Instead of transferring to the new location, Gallagher left Shell and began to work for the Standard Oil Company of New Jersey, who remained in the region. At one point, Gallagher worked for the British Eighth Army searching for water wells. During his time in the east Gallagher also lectured on geology at the Cairo University.

In the early 1940s Standard transferred Gallagher to South America, where he spent time in Ecuador, Guatemala, Honduras, and Panama. His South American stay led to many interesting experiences, including being granted a meeting with president Jorge Ubico to ask permission to search for oil in the north of the country. On another occasion, while in the passenger seat of a truck on a trip through the Andes, Gallagher's driver fainted from the altitude. Gallagher managed to steer the truck into a rock wall, preventing it from going off the cliff. Suffering from back pain, it was ten days before he was able to see a doctor, who concluded he was only experiencing muscle spasms. A year later in New York City, an X-Ray revealed three fractured vertebrae. Gallagher would have back pain the rest of his life. The pressure from giving a hand shake would often cause him pain, and to help the problem he would often use a two-hand clasp when meeting people.

In 1948 Standard sent Gallagher to Harvard University for a year to study management. Upon finishing at Harvard, Standard informed Gallagher that they wanted him to work as their head geologist in the Far East. Wanting to return to Canada, Gallagher instead took a job with Standard's Canadian subsidiary, Imperial Oil, in Calgary.

=== Dome Petroleum ===
In 1950 Gallagher was approached by Jim McCrea of Dome Mines, a Toronto company that had been in existence since 1910. Wanting to expand their operations to include oil, the company formed Dome Exploration (Western), wanting Gallagher to head the new operation. Throughout the 1950s Dome remained a relatively small company. Gallagher worked primarily on his own and had an office in the Alberta Block at 805 1st Street South West with his secretary Ethel Cairns. In 1951 Dome became public, selling a half-million shares, and in 1958 it changed its name to Dome Petroleum and moved into the new Dome Building at 706 8th Avenue South West. Having become fascinated with the Canadian North during the summer of 1936, Gallagher remained interested in the potential for northern oil and gas exploration. In 1959 Gallagher first filed for land position in the north, and in September 1961 Dome became the first company to drill in the Canadian Arctic. In 1974 Gallagher was contacted by then Minister of Northern Affairs, Jean Chrétien, to ask if Dome would be interested in exploration in the Beaufort Sea. Dome's first season of exploration in the Beaufort was in 1976. By the early 1980s, Dome had built a fleet of around 40 vessels. Although Dome invested a great deal of money in Arctic exploration, it never made a major discovery.

By the early 1980s Gallagher, although still Chief Executive, had relinquished some power to younger members of the company. In May 1981 Dome set out to acquire the Hudson's Bay Oil and Gas Company, which at the time was controlled by the American company Conoco. Gallagher had opposed this move, although he ultimately allowed it to take place. That June, Dome took a U.S.$1.68 billion loan from the Toronto-Dominion Bank, Royal Bank of Canada, Bank of Montreal, and the Canadian Imperial Bank of Commerce. In the fall Toronto-Dominion requested that part of the loan be repaid, at which time it was revealed that Dome did not have the money. This revelation threw the Canadian banking system into a state of chaos for the next year before a rescue package for Dome was developed in the fall of 1982. On 8 April 1983, Gallagher stepped down as the head of Dome. In his 33 years of running the company, he had turned a one-man operation into the third-largest private company in Canada, at the time.

=== Personal life ===
Gallagher was made an Officer of the Order of Canada in 1983. After leaving Dome, he dedicated his time largely to political causes, helping to found the Reform Party of Canada. Gallagher was known for his affable personality and famous smile, being given the nickname "Smilin' Jack." In August 1949 he married Kathleen Marjorie Stewart (1919–2011), who was originally from Red Deer, Alberta. They, along with their three sons, lived in a house located at 4315 Britannia Drive in Calgary's mid-century Britannia neighbourhood. He died from cancer at a hospice in Calgary on December 16, 1998. The house remains largely original today and has been featured in local architectural tours. Gallagher's personal papers are held at the Glenbow Museum as the Jack Gallagher fonds.
