= Canfor =

Canadian integrated forest products company

Canfor Corporation
- Type: Public
- Traded as: TSX: CFP; S&P/TSX Composite Component
- Industry: Forest Products
- Founded: Vancouver, British Columbia, Canada
- Founder: John Prentice and Poldi Bentley
- Headquarters: Vancouver, British Columbia, Canada
- Key people: Pat Elliott, CFO, Canfor and Canfor Pulp, and SVP, Sustainability
- Products: Forest products
- Number of employees: 6,331 (2017)
- Website: www.canfor.com

Canfor Corporation is a Canadian integrated forest products company based in Vancouver, British Columbia.

== History ==
The company traces its roots to the late 1930s, when brothers-in-law John G. Prentice and L.L.G. "Poldi" Bentley and their families left their native Austria just before the outbreak of World War II. They settled in Vancouver and established a small mill in 1939 called Pacific Veneer that was the beginning of the more than 75-year-old company. It adopted the name Canadian Forest Products Limited in 1947.

In 2006, the company was subject to a proxy fight between billionaires Jim Pattison and Stephen A. Jarislowsky, who owned 30% and 18% of the firm's shares, respectively. Pattison won and ousted CEO Jim Shepherd over Canfor's poor performance and declining share price, which saw Jim Pattison appointed interim CEO.

Canfor's operating loss for 2024 was $942.2 Million, as indicated by their Q4 2024 Quarterly Results, in addition to an operating loss of $532 Million in 2023.

Canfor's operating loss through Q2, 2025 has culminated to approximately $233.8 million dollars. The company's share price on August 4th, 2025 sits at a 5 year low.

Poldi Bentley's son Peter Bentley (1930-2021) was the Chairman Emeritus of the Board of Directors. Canfor produces softwood lumber, specialty wood products, and engineered wood products. Canfor also owns a controlling share in Canfor Pulp Limited, which produces northern softwood kraft pulp and kraft paper in BC.

As of 2016, the company has an annual production capability of 5.9 billion board feet of lumber, 1.1 million tonnes of northern softwood market kraft pulp, approximately 220,000 tonnes of BCTMP and 140,000 tonnes of kraft paper.

Operations or offices are located in:

- Camden, SC - yellow light
- Conway, SC - yellow light
- DeRidder, LA - green light
- El Dorado, AR - yellow light
- Elko, BC - bright green light
- Fulton, AL - red light
- Graham, NC - red light
- Grande Prairie, AB - green light
- Hermanville, MS - yellow light
- Jackson, AL - red light
- Moultrie, GA - yellow light
- Myrtle Beach, SC - yellow light
- Prince George, BC - dark red light
- Thomasville, GA - yellow light
- Washington, GA - yellow light
- Wynndel, BC - dark red light

On November 15, 2018 Canfor announced that it had entered into an agreement to acquire a 70% share of the Vida Group, a wood products company based in Sweden. The prior owners of Vida maintain a 30% share and manage day-to-day operations.

Canfor formerly owned the Englewood Railway on Vancouver Island, but sold it to Western Forest Products in 2006.

Canfor has 6,380 employees as of 2016.

Canfor is a member of the Forest Products Association of Canada.
