= Columbia Gulf Transmission =

Columbia Gulf Transmission gathers gas in the Gulf of Mexico and brings it to Columbia Gas Transmission. It is owned by TransCanada Corporation. Its FERC code is 70.

It is one of the principal interstate pipelines running in the western segment of the Southwest-to-Northeast corridor for gas supply, along with the Tennessee Gas Pipeline and the Texas Eastern Transmission Pipeline.

They produced the largest peak-day delivery volume in the region of 1,700,000,000 cubic feet (48,000,000 m^{3}) per day. In 1995, they operated at near 100% year-round.
