= S. Robert Blair =

Canadian engineer and businessman

- Born: 13 August 1929; Port of Spain, Trinidad
- Died: 18 April 2009 (aged 79); Vancouver, British Columbia
- Education: Queen's University (BSc 1951)
- Spouse: Lois Anne Wedderburn (m. 1953)

Sidney Robert "Bob" Blair CC (13 August 1929 – 18 April 2009) was a Canadian oilman. During a career that spanned from 1951 to 1991, Blair played a major role in the development of the Alberta petroleum industry. In 1970 he was appointed president of the Alberta Gas Trunk Line Company Limited (later renamed NOVA Corporation), a position he held until 1986. Over the course of his presidency, he transformed AGTL/NOVA from a provincial transmission utility into a diversified energy and chemicals giant. Blair was a vocal economic nationalist who spent much of his career working to develop Canadian-owned industry, often putting himself in conflict with Canada's foreign-owned majors. He is also remembered for leading the unsuccessful attempt to build the Mackenzie Valley Pipeline in the 1970s.

== Biography ==
Sidney Robert Blair was born in Trinidad to Sidney Martin Blair (1897–1981) and Janet Russell Gentleman (1895–1974). Blair's father, of Scottish Presbyterian origin, was born in Parry Sound and in 1902 moved with his family to Alberta. Before World War I he attended classes at the University of Alberta. During the war he served as a flight instructor in the Royal Flying Corps and lectured at Khaki University. In 1922 he graduated Bachelor of Science at the University of Birmingham. He then returned to Canada and studied at the University of Alberta under Karl A. Clark, and graduated Master of Science in 1924. Blair spent the rest of his career in the petroleum industry. During World War II he worked for the Air Ministry in the supply of aviation fuel. In 1949 he joined the Bechtel Corporation and retired in 1974 as president of Canadian Bechtel Limited. In 1950 he published the famous Report on the Alberta Bituminous Sands, otherwise known as the "Blair Report," which led to the development of the Athabasca oil sands.

On 26 March 1927, Sidney Blair married Janet "Nettie" Gentleman, originally of Lanarkshire, in Windsor, Ontario. Following their marriage, Blair began working for Trinidad Leaseholds Limited and took a position managing an asphalt refinery in Trinidad. It was there, on 13 August 1929, that Sidney Robert Blair was born. Over the next decade, the Blair family moved between Trinidad, England, Canada, and the United States. Their second child, Mona Helen Margaret (1934–2020) was born in England on 6 February 1934.

Bob Blair attended Choate School in Wallingford, Connecticut. He then entered Queen's University and graduated Bachelor of Science in 1951. From 1951 to 1958, Blair worked as a field engineer on pipeline and refinery construction projects. In 1959 he joined the Alberta and Southern Gas Company Limited, a subsidiary of the Pacific Gas and Electric Company, and was involved in operations and purchasing. In December 1969 Blair was appointed executive vice-president of the Alberta Gas Trunk Line Company Limited, and in September 1970 was made president. Blair was appointed chairman of the board in June 1985, and in January 1986 ceded the presidency to Robert L. Pierce. He retired as chairman in 1991.

Historian and author Peter C. Newman described Blair as an outlier amongst Canadian petroleum executives. In defiance of the industry's elitism, Newman said Blair had "no time for the oilmen's club-and-golf circuit, preferring instead to settle deals over a cup of coffee in a local eatery," and claimed he was "the only executive of a major oil company ever to visit the towns likely to be affected by his company's dealings to talk about their concerns."

After his retirement in 1991, Blair ran for the Liberal Party of Canada in the 1993 Canadian federal election. In the election he came second in the Calgary Centre riding behind Jim Silye of the Reform Party. He was Canada's commissioner general at Expo 2000. In 1980 he was made an Officer of the Order of Canada and was promoted to Companion in 1985.

On 13 June 1953 Blair married Lois Anne Wedderburn (1928–2009) at St Andrew's United Church in Lanark, Ontario. Bob and Lois met in Kingston while he was at Queen's and she was attending nursing school at the Kingston General Hospital. The couple had five children: Megan, James, Robert, Martin, and Charlotte. They divorced in 1978. Blair died at North Vancouver's Lions Gate Hospital on 18 April 2009. His last residence was in North Vancouver.
