= Tolko =

Canadian forest products company

Tolko Industries Ltd.
- Type: Private
- Industry: Forestry
- Founded: 1956
- Headquarters: Vernon, British Columbia, Canada
- Key people: Pino Pucci, (CEO); Brad Thorlakson, (Executive Chairman)
- Revenue: ▲$2.3 billion CAD (2005)
- Number of employees: 3,100 (2012)
- Website: www.tolko.com

Tolko Industries Ltd. is a privately owned Canadian forest products company based in Vernon, British Columbia. It manufactures and markets specialty forest products to world markets. Tolko's products include lumber, plywood, veneer and oriented strand board. The Company's Woodlands operations in British Columbia, Alberta, and Saskatchewan have received third-party certification of their sustainable forest management systems.

Tolko employs approximately 3000 people across B.C., Alberta, and Saskatchewan.

In February 2018, the company announced it had formed a joint partnership with family-owned Hunt Forest Products to create LaSalle Lumber Company. The two companies will work together to build a $115 million, state-of-the-art lumber mill in Urania, Louisiana. This is Tolko's first venture into the U.S.

Tolko's access to the Browns Creek watershed has been subject to a blockade by the Okanagan Indian Band since February 22, 2010. The blockade is supported by the Union of BC Indian Chiefs.

Tolko Industries Ltd. is a member of the Forest Products Association of Canada.
