= Forest Products Association of Canada =

Canadian trade association

- Formerly: Canadian Pulp and Paper Association (1913–2001)
- Industry: Pulp and paper
- Founded: 8 March 1913
- Headquarters: 99 Bank Street, Ottawa, Ontario
- Website: fpac.ca

The Forest Products Association of Canada (FPAC) is a trade association which represents Canada's wood, pulp and paper producers both nationally and internationally in government, trade, and environmental affairs.

== History ==
Founded in 1913, the Canadian Pulp and Paper Association changed its name to the Forest Products Association of Canada in February 2001.

In May 2010, under the leadership of then President Avrim Lazar, FPAC successfully helped to negotiate The Canadian Boreal Forest Agreement, with several large ENGOs. The first independent audit of the CBFA in 2011 revealed a lack of progress in achieving formal milestones and in 2017 the long-term survival of the agreement was put into question.

== Description ==
Third-party certification of member companies' forest practices is a condition of membership in the Association. FPAC member companies are: AbitibiBowater, Alberta-Pacific Forest Industries Inc. (Al-Pac), Canfor, Canfor Pulp Limited Partnership, Cariboo Pulp and Paper Company, Cascades Inc., Catalyst Paper Corporation, FF Soucy, Howe Sound Pulp and Paper Mill, NewPage Corporation, Kruger Inc., Louisiana-Pacific Canada Ltd., Mercer, Mill & Timber Products Ltd., Papier Masson, SFK Pulp, Tembec Enterprises Inc. Tolko Industries Ltd., UPM-Kymmene Miramichi Inc., West Fraser Timber Co. Ltd., Weyerhaeuser Company Limited.

== Leadership ==
=== President (to 1944) and Chairman (from 1944) ===
- 1913, 1914 – Carl Riordan
- 1915 – Isaac Hillock Weldon
- 1916 – John Hamilton Adams Acer
- 1917 – Charles Howard Futvoye Smith
- 1918 – F. J. Campbell
- 1919 – J. A. Bothwell
- 1920 – George Chahoon Jr.
- 1921 – Percy B. Wilson
- 1922 – George M. McKee
- 1923 – H. F. E. Kent
- 1924 – George Carruthers
- 1925 – Frank W. Clarke
- 1926, 1927 – L. R. Wilson
- 1928, 1929 – Col. Charles Hugh Le Pailleur Jones
- 1930, 1931, 1932 – Harold Crabtree
- 1933 – ?
- 1934, 1935 – Brig. John Burton White DSO
- 1936, 1937, 1938, 1939 – R. A. McInnis
- 1940, 1941 – F. G. Robinson
- 1942 – R. L. Weldon
- 1942, 1943 – Edmund Howard Smith
- 1944 –
- 1945 –
- 1946 –
- 1947 –
- 1948 –
- 1949 –
- 1950 – M. Lyne
- 1951 –
- 1952 –
- 1953 –
- 1954 – Paul E. Cooper

=== Secretary (to 1945) and President (from 1945) ===
From 1917 to 1945, the de facto chief executive of the association was its permanent secretary. The office of the president as a full-time role was created in March 1945 for Robert MacLaren Fowler. Upon Fowler's appointment as president, former secretary A. E. Cadman was made general manager.

1. Arthur Lionel Dawe, 1917 – 14 November 1921
2. Edward Beck, 14 November 1921 – 23 October 1935 †
3. Alfred Ernest Cadman, January 1936 – March 1945
4. Robert MacLaren Fowler, March 1945 – 28 January 1972
5. Howard Hart, 28 January 1972 – 19 September 1994
6. Lise Lachapelle, 19 September 1994 – 31 December 2001
7. Avrim Lazar, 1 January 2002 – April 2012
8. David Lindsay, September 2012 – December 2015
9. Derek Nighbor, 7 March 2016 – present
