= W. Brett Wilson =

Canadian businessman (born 1957)

Brett Wilson CM SOM
- Born: July 1, 1957 (age 69); North Battleford, Saskatchewan, Canada
- Education: University of Saskatchewan; University of Calgary
- Occupations: Businessman, investment banker, and philanthropist
- Political party: Conservative
- Children: 3

William Brett Wilson CM SOM (born July 1, 1957) is a Canadian investment banker, businessman, and investor. He was a season 3, 4 & 5 panellist on CBC Television's Dragons' Den. He has attracted widespread attention and media coverage for his controversial public statements, particularly on social media.

== Career ==
Wilson graduated with degree in Civil Engineering and worked for Imperial Oil for three years in the oilfields of Western Canada. In 1985, he graduated from the University of Calgary with an MBA in entrepreneurship and began work as an investment banker with McLeod Young Weir (now Scotia Capital). Wilson co-founded an investment banking advisory firm, Wilson Mackie & Co., in 1991, and in 1993, co-founded FirstEnergy Capital Corp. in Calgary, Alberta with Rick Grafton, Jim Davidson, and N. Murray Edwards. FirstEnergy is a Canadian stock brokerage firm that provides investment-banking services to global participants in the energy sector. Wilson retired as Chairman of FirstEnergy in 2008. His sports interests include ownership in the Nashville Predators of the National Hockey League.

After announcing his departure from Dragons' Den in early 2011, he participated in his own entrepreneurship-themed series, Risky Business. He has written regularly on entrepreneurship for the Oilweek, Alberta Venture and the National Post. In 2012, he published Redefining Success: Still Making Mistakes through Penguin Books. He regularly speaks to student and business audiences about the importance of marketing, entrepreneurship, and philanthropy and believes these subjects should be core curriculum. Wilson was also the largest shareholder and chairman of Forent Energy which filed for bankruptcy in 2017 following an unsuccessful amalgamation attempt.

== Philanthropy ==
Wilson has stated that he sees corporate social responsibility not as an obligation, but as an opportunity, and believes that strategic philanthropy can create major social and economic benefits. He has shaved his head to support Kids' Cancer Care, and climbed Mount Kilimanjaro to support Alzheimer's research. He has for many years made annual trips with Youth with a Mission to Mexico to build homes for the poor. He has chronicled his philanthropic perspectives in a series of articles written for Alberta Venture magazine.

Specific events hosted by Wilson have supported prostate cancer, David Foster Foundation Right to Play, Little Warriors, Boomer's Legacy, 777 Run for Sight and Dare to Care and the Veterans' Food Bank. He is active on funding research into the issue of domestic abuse and has funded the Wilson Centre for Domestic Abuse Studies at the Calgary Counselling Centre. He also supports the sport of volleyball through the Rally Pointe volleyball centre in Calgary, Alberta. He is a strong mental health advocate and supporter of programs which help with the treatment of eating disorders.

He travelled to Afghanistan to visit front-line Canadian troops with General Walter Natynczyk, Defence Minister Peter MacKay, hockey player Guy Lafleur and actor Paul Gross and has hosted events to support military members and their families.

== Controversies ==
=== Remarks regarding Calgary mayoral election ===
On June 3, 2020, Wilson made tweets accusing Calgary mayor Naheed Nenshi of "playing the race card" to win the 2017 election. Mayor Nenshi called the "hateful" tweet an example of "casual racism".

Royal Roads University, which had previously issued an honorary degree to Wilson, put forward a statement that they were "deeply disturbed" by Wilson's comments which were "inconsistent with RRU's values and the president's recent statements on anti-racism" and references to Wilson on the university's website were taken down.

The Nashville Predators (which are part owned by Wilson) also issued a statement against the "race card" comment made by Wilson, stating "The Nashville Predators stand against racism and discrimination in all forms. W. Brett Wilson is one of many investors in the Nashville Predators Ownership Group, and his views, comments and social media posts do not reflect or represent the views of the organization or the National Hockey League."

The reaction prompted Wilson to "apologize without reservation".

=== Hang protestors for treason ===
In 2018, Wilson produced a series of tweets describing anti-pipeline activists as "slimy bastards," calling for them to be hanged for "treason". CBC Calgary decided against using Wilson as a future commentator because of these comments.

=== Petition for removal from the Order of Canada Advisory Council ===
In May 2018, Wilson suggested that money be raised to pay B.C. NDP MLAs to cross the floor and bring down B.C.'s minority government, which resulted in a petition that he be removed from the Order of Canada advisory council "for his continued un-democratic and un-civil comments inciting violence against Canadians and undermining democratic institutions in our country."

== Personal ==
Wilson was born in North Battleford, Saskatchewan.

Wilson was married to his engineering classmate from 1981 to 2001. Together they have three adult children.

== Selected awards ==
- Canada's Top 40 under 40 - Caldwell Partners (1997)
- Top 20 Deal Makers in Canada - Globe & Mail (1999)
- Top 10 list of M&A specialists in Canada - Globe & Mail - (2000)
- Management Alumni Excellence (MAX) Award, University of Calgary, Haskayne School of Business (2003)
- International Legacy of Honour, Young Presidents Organization - recognizing the global YPO leader who best exemplifies commitment to excellence in business, community orientation and the ideals of YPO (2004)
- Spirit of Giving Award - Association of Fundraising Professionals (2005)
- University of Calgary Top 40 Alumni (2006–2007)
- Calgary's Person of the Year - Avenue Magazine (2007)
- University of Saskatchewan Alumni Award of Achievement (2007)
- University of Saskatchewan Top 100 Alumni (2007)
- Distinguished Lecturer, CJ Mackenzie Banquet, University of Saskatchewan College of Engineering (2008)
- Business Person of the Year - Alberta Venture Magazine (2008)
- Nation Builder Award - Canadian Youth Business Foundation (2009)
- Honorary Doctor of Laws, Royal Roads University (2010)
- One of Calgary's Top 10 New Mavericks (2010)
- City of Calgary Signature Award – for bringing significant recognition to Calgary (2010)
- Appointment to the Order of Canada (2011)
- Saskatchewan Order of Merit (2012)
- Queen Elizabeth II Diamond Jubilee Medal (2012)
- Olds College Centennial Honorary Degree Recipient (2013)
- SAIT, Honorary Degree Recipient, Bachelor of Science (2015)
- University of Saskatchewan, Honorary Degree Recipient, Doctor of Laws (2015)
- Bob Edwards Award (2015)
- Canadian Petroleum Hall of Fame, Inductee (2016)
- Oil and Gas Council, Lifetime Achievement Award (2016)
