= Supertest Petroleum =

Canadian petroleum company (1925–1973)

Supertest Petroleum Limited
- Industry: Petroleum
- Founded: 17 December 1925
- Defunct: 1973
- Fate: Acquired by British Petroleum Canada
- Headquarters: Supertest Building, 245 Pall Mall Street, London, Ontario

Supertest Petroleum Limited was a Canadian petroleum company that operated from 1923 to 1973. Its head office was in London, Ontario. It marketed itself as "Canada's All-Canadian Company", and was acquired by BP Canada in 1971.

== History ==
John Gordon Thompson (1894-1982), an operator of automobile service centres and manufacturer of tire repair and gasoline pumps, formed London Automotive Service Ltd. with James D. Good on 13 March 1923. They purchased the assets of the Energy Oil Company for $10,000. Energy Oil Company owned a run-down gas station on Dundas St. E. in London, Ontario, a bulk storage plant in London, and two fuel delivery tank trucks. Thompson was elected president and Good was named vice-president and secretary/treasurer. They adopted "Supertest" as the trademark name of their gasoline.

On 23 May 1923, Supertest opened it first gasoline station at 362 Dundas Street E. Gas sold for 31 cents/gallon), and the station sold Mobiloil lubricants. The new company was not a refiner and sourced its gasoline and oil from Imperial Oil Ltd.

In 1924, Supertest opened subsidiary companies in Hamilton and Ottawa.

On 17 December 1925, Supertest Petroleum Corporation, Limited was incorporated. A subsidiary was formed in St. Thomas, Ontario. Bulk distributing plants were opened in Glencoe, Wingham and Seaforth, Ontario.

In 1926, Supertest bought the Ensign Oil Company of Montreal, opened a bulk distributing plant at Port Robinson, Ontario, and amalgamated all of the subsidiaries companies into one major company known as "Supertest Petroleum Corporation Limited". Supertest registered the trademark "Hi Compression" for its new gasoline.

In 1928, a tank ship, the M.S. Supertest, was put into operation. It made deliveries to Kingston, Ottawa and Montreal until it was sold shortly after World War II.

In 1932, Supertest registered the trademark "Wonder Gasoline".

From 1928 to 1936, the company opened new divisions and established bulk plants throughout Ontario and Quebec. By 1936, Supertest owned and operated 342 stations with over 800 dealers in Ontario and Quebec and over 5,000 consumer accounts. The company had over 100 trucks and 60 automobiles, and employed over 500 people.

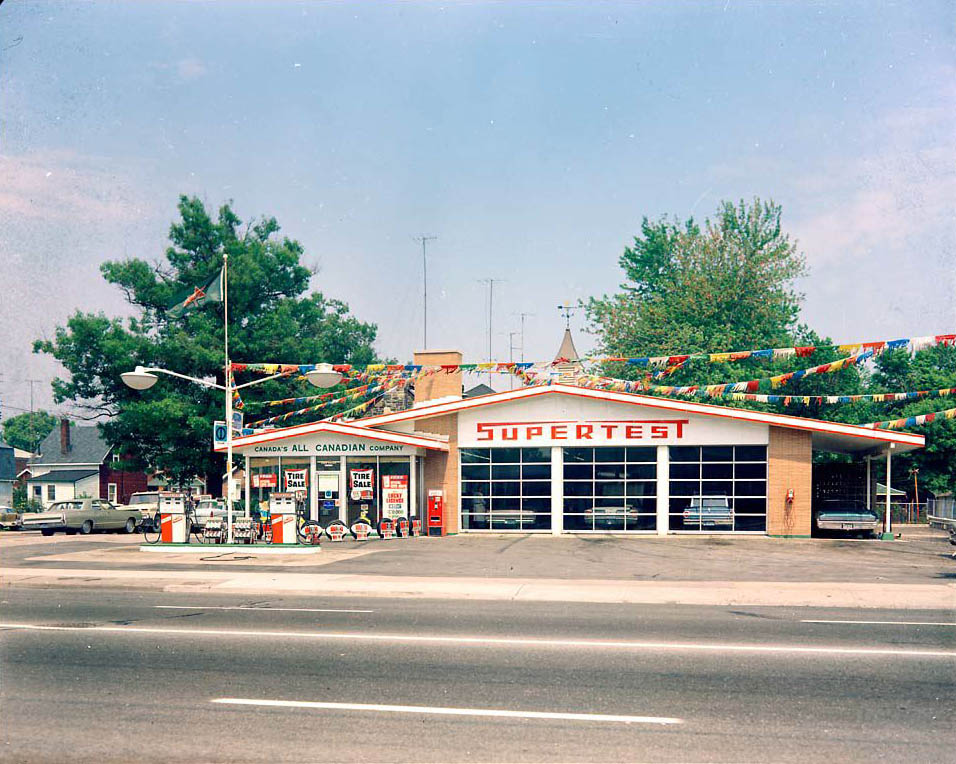
Supertest station in Toronto, ca. 1965

In 1944, the company sponsored the first "Supertest Stake Races" harness horse race. In 1945, it began publishing The Maple Leaf, a company magazine.

In 1950 James D. Good, Vice President of Supertest Oil, died. His home on the southwest corner of Waterloo Street and Epworth Avenue eventually became the music school at the University of Western Ontario.

In the mid-1950s, Supertest Petroleum opened an exploration office in Calgary, Alberta. By 1971, Supertest was producing about 3,000 barrels per day, or about 10% of the sales of its gas stations.

James Gordon Thompson, son of co-founder JohnGordon Thompson, was president from 1960-1971. In 1966, Supertest sponsored the first Canadian tournament for the Ladies Professional Golf Association, the Supertest Ladies Open, at the Sunningdale Golf Club in London. Fifty of the world's top women golfers competed for the Supertest Trophy.

In 1971, Supertest was sold to British Petroleum Canada (BP). The familiar Supertest maple leaf logo was modified to incorporate the BP shield and to drop the "All-Canadian" slogan. By the end of 1973, the Supertest logo and name had been phased out by BP Canada. In 1983, BP Canada was purchased by Petro-Canada, which was then owned by the Government of Canada. Petro-Canada continued to use the Supertest name in their line of transmission oil lubricants through the year 2000; products since renamed to PRODURO.
