= Calgary Petroleum Club =

Private club in Calgary, Alberta

- Formation: 21 January 1949; 77 years ago
- Type: Private club
- Headquarters: 319 5 Avenue SW
- Website: calpeteclub.com

The Calgary Petroleum Club is a private social club in Calgary, Alberta. The club was founded in 1948 as a gentlemen's club catered to executives in the petroleum industry, but since 1989 has been mixed-sex. Membership in the Calgary Petroleum Club has been described as the "pinnacle of social and corporate achievement in a one-industry town."

== History ==
The Calgary Petroleum Club was conceived in the summer of 1948 by a group of Calgary oilmen led by John H. Bevel. On Friday, 21 January 1949, the members of the club convened in the Palliser Hotel to launch the club formally. That evening the members elected the first board and approved club bylaws. Members elected to the first board were John H. Bevel (Canadian Gulf Oil), J. Grant Spratt (Anglo-Canadian Oil), S. F. Heard (Royalite Oil), Tom L. Brook (British Dominion Oil), Clifton C. Cross (Globe Oil), Carl O. Nickle (Daily Oil Bulletin), R. C. Brown (Hudson's Bay Oil and Gas), John O. Galloway (California Standard), C. F. Schock (Stanolind Oil and Gas), and H. E. Denton (General Petroleums).

Carl Nickle reported on the event the following day in the Calgary Herald:

The "Calgary Petroleum Club" was formally launched on Friday evening when more than 100 members of the oil fraternity met at the Palliser hotel to approve the application for incorporation, bylaws, and to elect the club's first board of governors. The club in Canada's oil capital has a distinctly international flavor, reflecting the Canadian-American-British backing of Western-Canada's fast-growing oil industry. Like Petroleum Clubs in American oil centres, the Calgary club's object is social and educational. It should help to get oilmen better acquainted with the other, something not too easy at present when it is considered that the oil fraternity is several hundred strong, and is steadily increasing in number.

For the next year the Petroleum Club used the Sun Room at the Palliser as its home. On 13 April 1950 the Duke of Windsor joined the club for lunch at the Palliser as a guest of honor. The Duke was made an honorary member and was the first person to sign the club's guest book.

On 30 July 1950, the Petroleum Club merged with the older Renfrew Club into a new club under the name of the Calgary Petroleum Club. The Renfrew Club had been incorporated in August 1929 as a businessmen's club. At the time of the merger the Petroleum had around 400 members, 126 of whom were also Renfrew members. The Renfrew's membership was around 700, making the new club's membership approximately 1,000. Upon the merger, the Calgary Petroleum Club became Western Canada's largest gentlemen's club. The new club initially operated out of the old Renfrew Club, which used the second floor of the Motor Car Supply Building at 321 6 Avenue SW.

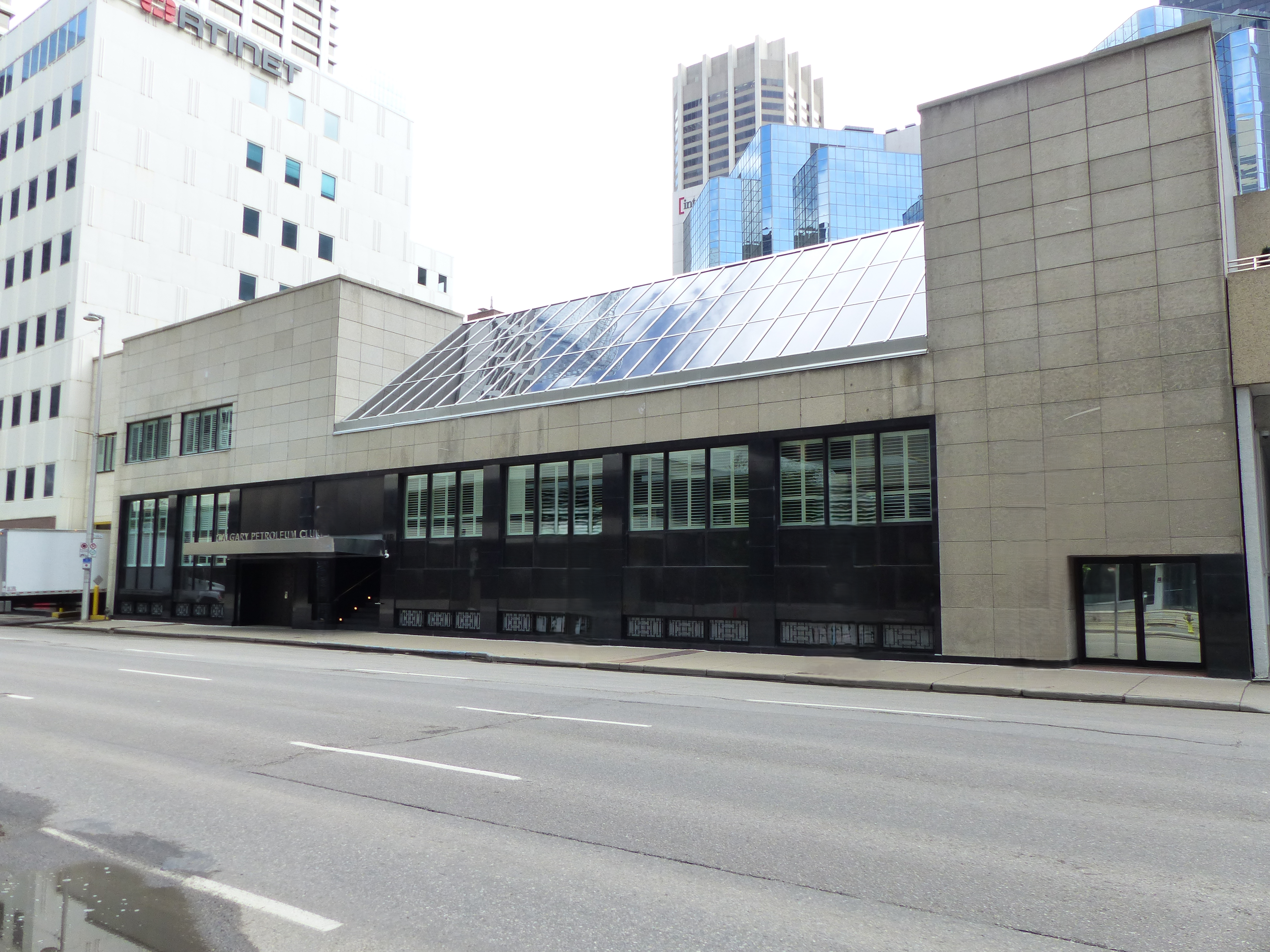
The clubhouse, designed by Rule, Wynn & Rule, opened on 4 August 1958

In 1956 the Petroleum Club purchased a 150-foot lot at 319 5 Avenue SW. The club hired local architectural firm Rule Wynn and Rule to design a new clubhouse. The new building was one storey high; a nine-storey office tower addition was intended to be built above the club but was never constructed. Harry Forrester turned the sod for the new building on 22 April 1957. On Friday, 1 August 1958 the club moved to the new headquarters and on Saturday held a cocktail reception. The following Monday, 4 August 1958, the club opened for business. After the move, the new Calgary Professional Club moved into the old space in the Motor Car Supply Building.

On 19 May 1989 the members of the club voted to cease operating as a gentlemen's club and begin admitting women members. This followed a vote on 17 November 1986 in which the members voted to remain a men's club.

The Canadian Heraldic Authority granted the club its coat of arms on 5 November 1991. The symbolism includes oil drops, a Stetson, and a derrick. It carries the motto "Perseverance, Pride, Excellence."

In the early morning of Friday, 13 May 2005, an arsonist set a fire in the club causing roughly $400,000 of damage. The club underwent major renovations following the fire. After the closure of the Calgary Professional Club in 1999 and the 400 Club in 2002, the Calgary Petroleum Club and the Ranchmen's Club are the city's only remaining private social clubs.

== See also ==
- Ranchman's Club
- List of gentlemen's clubs in Canada
