= Robert MacLaren Fowler =

Canadian lawyer (1906–1980)

Robert MacLaren Fowler OC
- Born: 7 December 1906; Peterborough, Ontario
- Died: 13 July 1980 (aged 73); Hawkesbury, Ontario
- Education: University of Toronto (B.A., 1928); Osgoode Hall (LL.B., 1931)
- Spouse: Sheila Gordon Ramsay (m. 1934)

Robert MacLaren Fowler OC (7 December 1906 – 13 July 1980) was a Canadian lawyer, best remember for chairing the Royal Commission on Broadcasting of 1955–57, whose conclusions, though not adopted at the time, eventually led to the creation of the Canadian Radio-Television Commission.

== Biography ==
Born in Peterborough, Ontario, Fowler was educated at the University of Toronto and Osgoode Hall, before practising law in Toronto. He served on the staff of the Rowell–Sirois Commission. During the Second World War, Fowler was Secretary of the Wartime Prices and Trade Board from 1942 to 1945, when he resigned to become President of the Canadian Pulp and Paper Association, a post he would hold until 1976.

A Liberal supporter, he was appointed to chair the Royal Commission on Broadcasting in 1955. In 1957, the Commission recommended the creation of a national regulator for all broadcasting, public and private. The recommendation was rejected by John Diefenbaker's government.

He was among the first group of appointees to the Order of Canada in 1967, receiving the Medal of Service (later exchanged for that of an Officer of the Order of Canada).
