= Ted Newall =

Canadian businessman

- Born: James Edward Malcolm Newall; August 20, 1935; Holden, Alberta
- Died: April 26, 2012 (aged 76); Calgary, Alberta
- Occupation: businessman
- Awards: Order of Canada

James Edward Malcolm "Ted" Newall, OC (August 20, 1935 – April 26, 2012) was a Canadian businessman and leading oil and manufacturing executive.

== Life and career ==
Born in Holden, Alberta, the son of Robert Robertson Newall and Lillian Alice Sheldon, Newall was raised in Prince Albert, Saskatchewan. Newall received a Bachelor of Commerce degree from the University of Saskatchewan in 1958, and married Margaret Elizabeth Lick, on February 14, 1959 in Toronto. They had three children over the span of six years, 1959 to 1965.

Newall started working at DuPont Canada in 1957 where he began in internal sales before eventually becoming chairman, president and CEO by 1979. In 1991, he became CEO of NOVA Corporation.

He was Chairman of the Board of Canadian Pacific Railway and has been a director of several major companies, including Alcan, BCE Inc., Bell Canada, Maple Leaf Foods, Royal Bank of Canada, and Methanex Corporation.

In 1993, he was made an Officer of the Order of Canada for being a "leading oil and manufacturing executive". In 2001, he was inducted into the Canadian Business Hall of Fame.

In 1998, Newall received the APEGGA Award for International Business Executive of the Year and in 1993, also received the CEO of the Year award as decided by Financial Post Magazine, Canada Post and Caldwell Partners.

He has received honorary degrees from the University of Calgary, the University of Saskatchewan, the University of Regina and the University of Ottawa. From 1996 to 2001, he was chair of the University of Calgary's Board of Governors.

He has eight grandchildren.
