= Ranchmen's Club =

Private club in Calgary, Alberta

- Formation: 5 May 1891
- Type: Private members' club
- Headquarters: 710 13 Avenue SW
- Coordinates: 51.041174°N 114.077338°W
- Website: ranchmensclub.com

The Ranchmen's Club is a private social club in Calgary, Alberta. The club was founded in 1891 as a gentlemen's club and is the oldest continuing club and institution in the city today. The club allowed women members starting in 1993. The Ranchmen's Club is often called the most prestigious private social club in Calgary.

== History ==
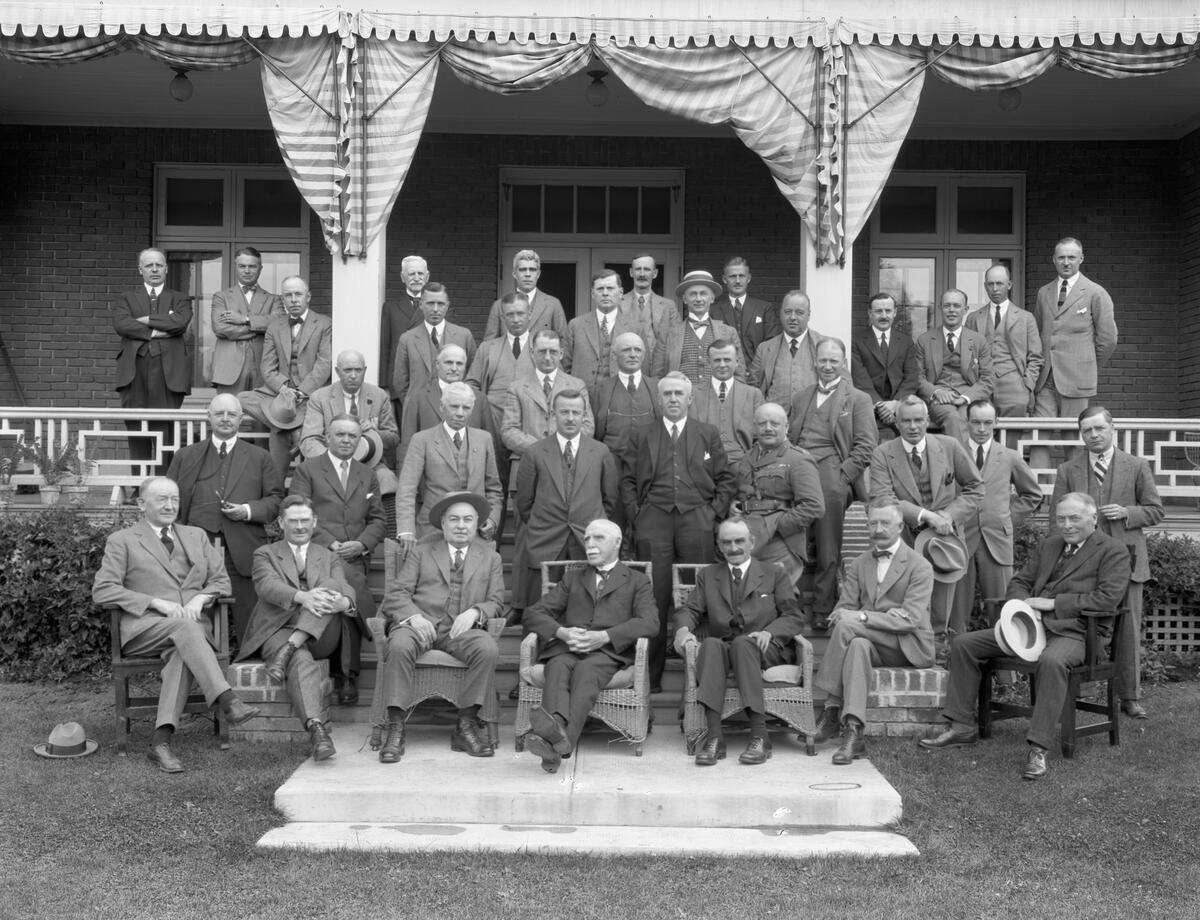
Early members of the Ranchmen's Club, 1925

The club originally began when a group of prominent southern Alberta ranchers gathered in the Lougheed Block and Mariaggi's Restaurant to form a social club in the style of an English gentlemen's club. The club's origins began in 1890 with a group known as the “Pack of Western Wolves”. On May 5, 1891, the group formally established themselves as The Ranchmen's Club during their first general meeting.

The club's first history book said of its founding that "The Ranchmen's Club was formed then by gentlemen to whom the British Club was an integral and unique way of life." The club originally consisted of only 46 members. The founding members were primarily prominent ranchers, including A.E. Cross, Duncan H. MacPherson, and Sir Francis McNaughton, as ranching formed the economic backbone of early Calgary. The club was formally incorporated by an ordinance of the N.W.T. Legislative Assembly on January 25, 1892.

In July 1892, the club moved into its first owned property on Seventh Avenue (then McIntyre Avenue). The club faced several financial crises in its early years, notably in 1896. During the land boom of 1912, the club sold its Seventh Avenue property for a substantial profit ($300,000) and purchased its current location at 710 13th Avenue S.W. for $78,000.

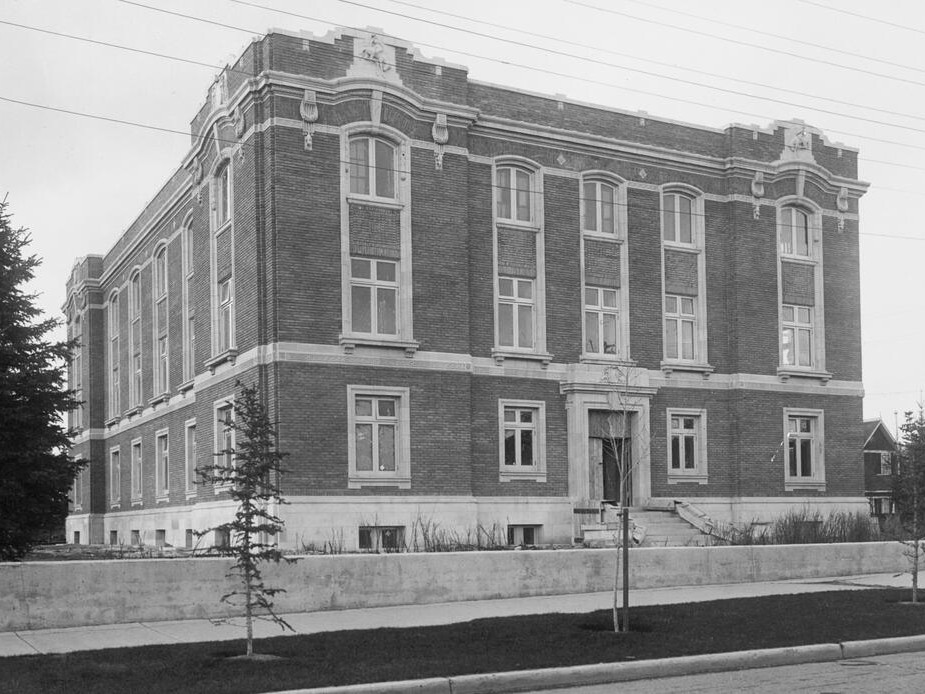
The clubhouse was designed in 1914 by Reginald Edwardes McDonnell.

The current clubhouse (designed by Calgarian architect R.E. McDonnell), which they still occupy today, was not constructed until 1914. It was built in a Renaissance Revival style and is noted for the "extensive use of terra cotta detailing". It officially opened on July 20, 1914. On the east facade of the clubhouse is an image of a cowboy riding a bucking bronco, which is said to have been designed by A.E. Cross. The clubhouse underwent renovations in both 1925 and 1982. The interior features extensive woodwork, book-lined walls, and a prestigious Western art collection launched by the "Picture Club" in 1949. Before this, the clubhouse walls were primarily decorated with dozens of taxidermied trophy heads, which members eventually felt had become "a little out of style". In 1984, the club initiated a program to name third-floor rooms after historical figures, with the Lougheed Room being the first so designated.

The Ranchmen's Club has hosted multiple famous white tie dinners, including one in 1919 in honour of Edward VIII (then Edward, Prince of Wales), who had purchased the E.P. Ranch in southern Alberta. Two dinners were held for Viscount Bennett, one upon his winning the leadership of the Conservative Party, and another shortly before he left Canada to take his seat in the House of Lords in the United Kingdom. On this occasion, it is noted that he became "quite emotional over leaving his Club".

A prestigious dinner was held in January 1946 for General H.D.G. Crerar, and was attended by 86 members. The club's 50th anniversary (1941) was marked by a formal dinner, as were the 65th (1956), the 100th (a black tie dinner in 1990), and the 125th anniversary gala in 2016, which was attended by then Calgary Mayor Naheed Nenshi and the Lieutenant Governor of Alberta, Lois Mitchell.

== Presidents ==
- 1891 – Thomas Somerville Charters Lee
- 1901 – M. Morris
- 1902 – John Pascoe Jeremy Jephson
- 1906 – Alfred Ernest Cross
- 1908 – Charles S. Lott
- 1911 – Alfred Ernest Cross
- 1912 – M. C. Bernard
- 1913 – W. H. Hogg
- 1913 – George Langrishe Peet
- 1914 – William Toole
- 1915 – M. C. Bernard
- 1917 – George Langrishe Peet
- 1919 – P. J. Bergerson
- 1920 – M. C. Bernard
- 1921 – Lt. Col. Gilbert Edward Sanders
- 1923 – H. Melvin
- 1925 – G. A. Walker
- 1926 – R. M. Gemmel
- 1927 – John Edward Annan Macleod
- 1929 – W. J. Watson
- 1929 – M. C. Bernard
- 1930 – H. A. Allison
- 1931 – G. B. Coutts
- 1933 – F. M. Harvey
- 1935 – G. R. Johnson
- 1937 – G. B. Coutts
- 1949 – W. G. Egbert
- 1952 – F. C. Manning
- 1956 – Lt. Col. D. F. Rogers
- 1958 – Benton Stewart MacKid
- 1960 – Donald Allen Sprung
- 1962 – William Rees Taprell
- 1966 – J. R. Alexander
- 1968 – J. J. Saucier
- 1968 – R. J. Burns
- 1970 – W. A. McGillivray
- 1972 – K. R. Lyle
- 1973 – R. G. Black
- 1975 – G. E. Lockwood

== Notable members ==
- Alfred Ernest Cross
- James Alexander Lougheed
- Maitland Stewart McCarthy
- Paddy Nolan
- William Pearce
- Charles Rouleau
- David Lynch Scott

== See also ==
- Calgary Petroleum Club (similar private members' club of Calgary)
- List of gentlemen's clubs in Canada
- Lougheed House
- Beltline, Calgary
