= TC Energy =

Canadian energy company

TC Energy Corporation

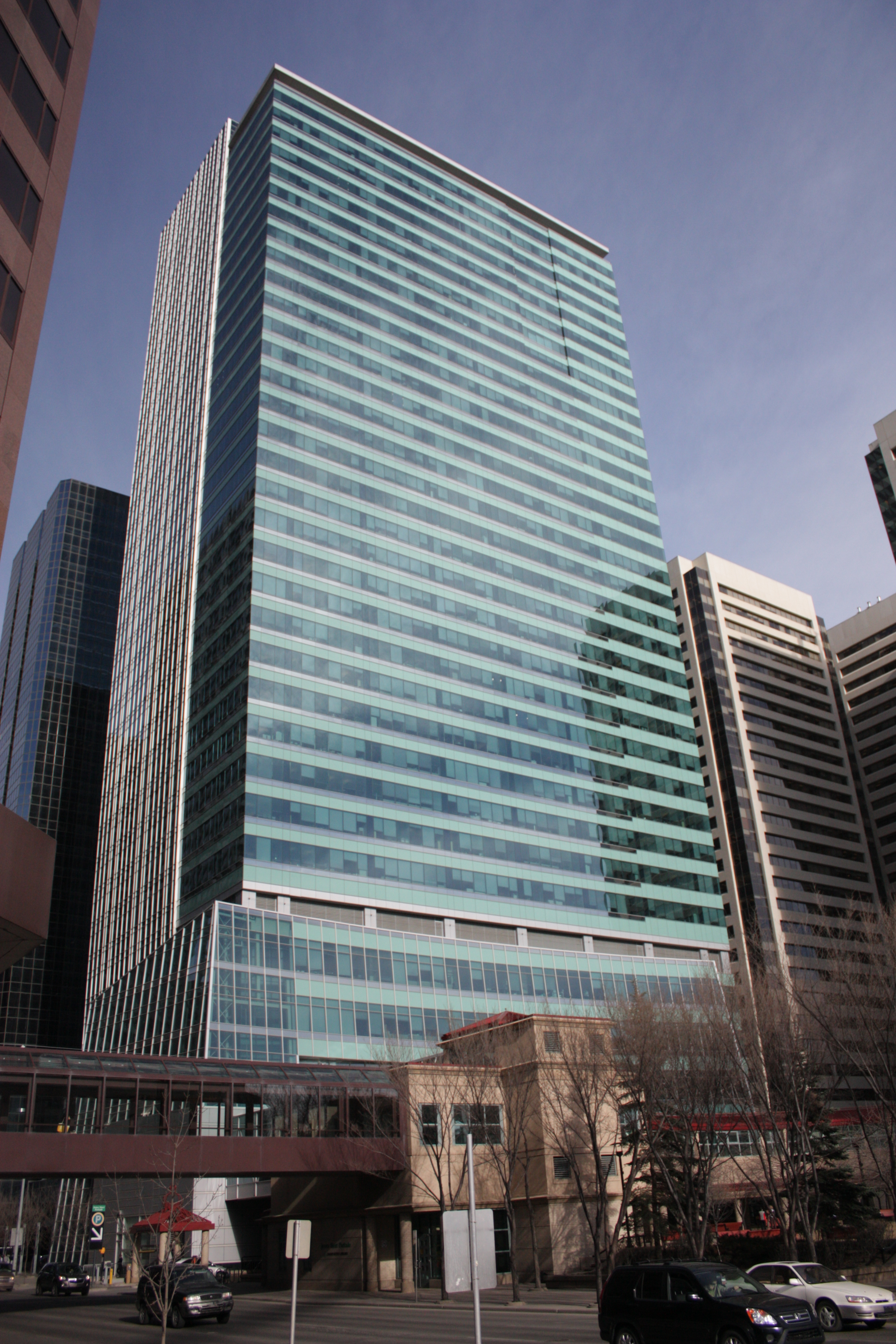
- The company's head office in the TC Energy Tower in downtown Calgary
- Type: Public
- Traded as: TSX: TRP; S&P/TSX 60 component
- Industry: Energy
- Founded: 1951; 75 years ago
- Headquarters: 450 1 Street SW; Calgary, Alberta; T2P 5H1
- Area served: Canada; Mexico; United States
- Key people: François Poirier (president and CEO)
- Services: Pipeline transport; Natural gas storage; Electricity generation
- Revenue: ▲CA$13.387 Billion (Fiscal Year Ended December 31, 2021)
- Operating income: ▼CA$2.166 Billion (Fiscal Year Ended December 31, 2021)
- Net income: ▼CA$2.046 Billion (Fiscal Year Ended December 31, 2021)
- Total assets: ▲CA$104.218 Billion (Fiscal Year Ended December 31, 2021)
- Total equity: ▲CA$33.396 Billion (Fiscal Year Ended December 31, 2021)
- Website: www.tcenergy.com

TC Energy Corporation (formerly TransCanada Corporation) is a Canadian energy company headquartered in Calgary, Alberta and serving North America. The company's focus is fossil fuel pipelines, and it builds and operates energy infrastructure across Canada, the United States, and Mexico, with core business segments in Natural Gas Pipelines, Power Generation and Energy Storage.

TC Energy's natural gas pipeline network spans approximately 94,000 kilometres (58,409 miles), transporting over 30% of the natural gas consumed across North America. The company also holds ownership interests in seven power generation facilities with a combined capacity of 4,650 megawatts (MW), including nuclear and natural gas-fired assets.

In addition to its pipeline and power operations, TC Energy maintains strategic investments in energy infrastructure that support liquefied natural gas (LNG) exports to global markets.

The company was founded in 1951 in Calgary. The company's US headquarters is located in the TC Energy Center skyscraper in Houston, Texas.

TC Energy is the largest shareholder in, and owns the general partner of, TC PipeLines.

== History ==
TC Energy was known as TransCanada before rebranding in 2019

The company was incorporated in 1951 by a Special Act of Parliament as Trans-Canada Pipe Lines Limited. In 1954 N. Eldon Tanner, president of Merrill Petroleums and former Alberta legislator, became president of the company. The purpose of the company was to develop the TransCanada pipeline (now known as the Canadian Mainline) to supply eastern Canadian markets with natural gas produced in the west.

In 1998, TransCanada Pipelines merged with NOVA Corporation's pipeline business, keeping the TransCanada name and becoming "the fourth largest energy services company in North America".

Seeking to expand its presence in the United States, in 2016, TransCanada acquired Columbia Pipeline Group (CPG) for US$13 billion from NiSource's Shareholders. The CPG acquisition added a pipeline network in Pennsylvania and surrounding states, where the Marcellus and Utica shale gas formations are located.

In May 2019, the company changed its name from TransCanada Corporation to TC Energy Corporation to better reflect the company's business, which includes pipelines, power generation and energy storage operations in Canada, the United States and Mexico.

In October 2019, the 56-story Bank of America Center skyscraper in Houston, Texas was renamed as TC Energy Center and serves as the company's US headquarters.

On October 1, 2024, TC Energy completed the spinoff of its Liquids Pipelines business creating an independent company, South Bow, focused on crude oil pipelines.

== Operations ==
=== Natural gas pipelines ===
TC Energy's natural gas pipelines business builds, owns and operates a network of natural gas pipelines across North America that connects gas production to interconnects and end use markets. The company transports over 30% of continental daily natural gas demand through approximately 94,000 km (58,409 mi) of pipelines. In addition, the company owns 532 Bcf of natural gas storage facilities, making TC Energy one of the largest natural gas storage providers in North America. This segment is TC Energy's largest segment, generating approximately 87% of the company's EBITDA in 2024. The Natural Gas Pipelines business is split into three operating segments: Canadian Natural Gas Pipelines, U.S. Natural Gas Pipelines, and Mexico Natural Gas Pipelines.

The major pipeline systems include:

- NGTL System (24,631 km) A wholly owned subsidiary, NOVA Gas Transmission Ltd., connects gas producers in the Western Canadian Sedimentary Basin with consumers and exports. TC Energy has the largest and most extensive natural gas network in Alberta.
- Canadian Mainline (14,082 km) This pipeline serves as a long haul delivery system transporting natural gas from the Western Canadian Sedimentary Basin across Canada to Ontario and Québec to deliver gas to downstream Canadian and U.S. markets. The pipeline has evolved accommodate additional supply connections closer to its markets. The mainline is over 60 years old
- Columbia Gas (18,768 km) This natural gas transportation system serves the Appalachian Basin, which contains the Marcellus and Utica plays, two of the largest natural gas shale plays in North America. The system also interconnects with other pipelines that provide access to the U.S. Northeast and the Gulf of Mexico.
- ANR Pipeline System (15,075 km) This pipeline system connects supply basins and markets throughout the U.S. Midwest, and south to the Gulf of Mexico. This includes connecting supply in Texas, Oklahoma, the Appalachian Basin and the Gulf of Mexico to markets in Wisconsin, Michigan, Illinois and Ohio. In addition, ANR has bi-directional capability on its Southeast Mainline and delivers gas produced from the Appalachian basin to customers throughout the Gulf Coast Region.
- Columbia Gulf (5,419 km) — This pipeline system was originally designed as a long haul delivery system transporting supply from the Gulf of Mexico to major demand markets in the U.S. Northeast. The pipeline is now transitioning to a north-to-south flow and expanding to accommodate new supply in the Appalachian Basin and its interconnects with Columbia Gas and other pipelines to deliver gas to various Gulf Coast markets.
- Mexico Pipeline Network (3,500 km) — This consists of a network of natural gas pipelines in Mexico.
- Southeast Gateway Pipeline (715 km) — A marine pipeline that will transport natural gas, connecting the supply from Tuxpan, Veracruz, to delivery points in Coatzacoalcos, Veracruz, and in Paraíso, Tabasco.
- Coastal Gaslink Pipeline Project (670 km) – Coastal Gaslink delivers natural gas from the Dawson Creek area to a facility near Kitimat, where LNG Canada prepares it for export to global markets by converting the gas to a liquefied state—also known as liquefied natural gas (LNG).

=== Energy ===
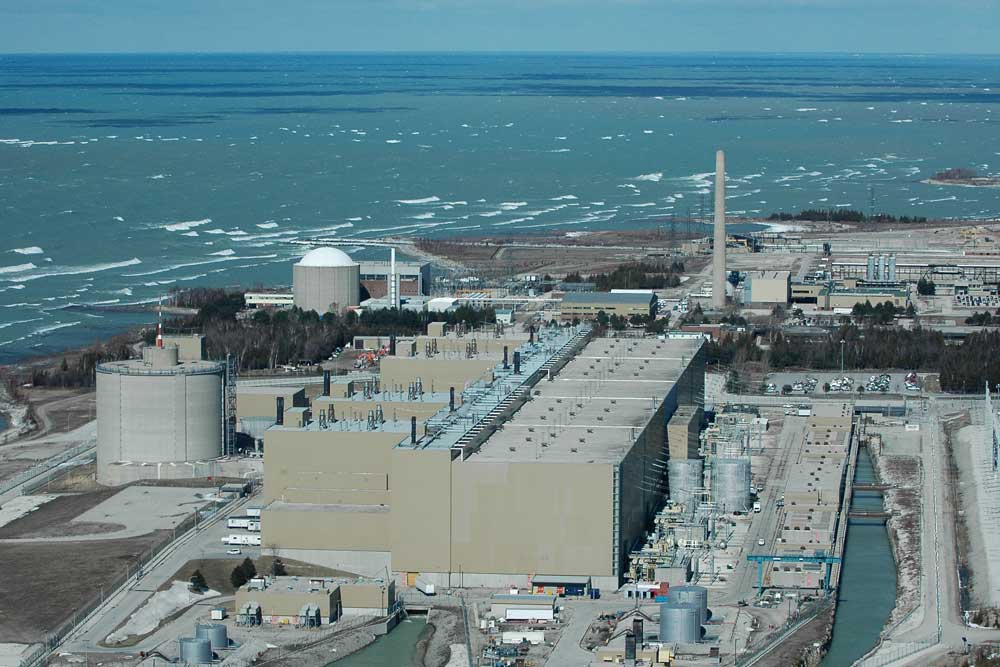
Bruce Nuclear Generating Station

TC Energy's Energy division consists of power generation and unregulated natural gas storage assets. The power business consists of approximately 4,650 megawatts (MW) of generation capacity owned or under development. These assets are located primarily in Canada and are powered by natural gas, nuclear, and wind.

- Western Power These assets include approximately 1,000 MW of power generation capacity through four natural gas-fired cogeneration facilities in Alberta and one in Arizona.
- Eastern Power These assets include approximately 2,900 MW of power generation capacity in Eastern Canada.
- Bruce Power This operates the Bruce Nuclear Generating Station in Ontario. Comprising eight nuclear units with a combined capacity of approximately 6,400 MW, it is currently the largest operating nuclear power plant in the world. TC Energy holds a 48.4% interest in the asset.
- Saddlebrook Solar + Storage project in Aldersyde, Alberta consisting of 81 MW of solar generation with utility-scale energy storage.

TC Energy has proposed two pumped storage projects to store and supply clean energy. The Ontario Pumped Storage Project near Meaford, Ontario would provide 1000 MW of clean energy and the proposed Canyon Creek Pumped Storage Project near Hinton, Alberta would provide 75 MW of clean energy.

== Ownership ==
As of September 2025, 84% of the share capital of TC Energy is owned by institutional investors. The dominant shareholder is the Royal Bank of Canada, which owns over 12% of the company. The top 10 shareholders hold ~40% of total shares outstanding.

== Operational projects ==
=== Operational natural gas pipelines ===
Name	Country	Length	TransCanada's participation	Description
NGTL System	Canada	24,631 km (15,305 mi)	100	Receives, transports and delivers natural gas within Alberta and B.C., and connects with the Canadian Mainline, Foothills system and third-party pipelines.
Canadian Mainline	Canada	14,101 km (8,762 mi)	100	Transports natural gas from the Alberta/Saskatchewanborder and the Ontario/U.S. border to serve eastern Canada and interconnects to the U.S.
Foothills	Canada	1,237 km (769 mi)	100	Transports natural gas from central Alberta to the U.S. border for export to the U.S. Midwest, PacificNorthwest, California and Nevada
Trans Québec & Maritimes	Canada	649 km (403 mi)	50	Connects with the Canadian Mainline near the Ontario/Québec border to transport natural gas to the Montréal to Québec City corridor, and interconnects with the Portland pipeline system that serves the northeast U.S.
Ventures LP	Canada	161 km (100 mi)	100	Transports natural gas to the oil sands region near Fort McMurray, Alberta. It also includes a 27 km (17 mile) pipeline supplying natural gas to a petrochemical complex at Joffre, Alberta.
Great Lakes Canada	Canada	58 km (36 mi)	100	Transports natural gas from the Great Lakes system in the U.S. to Ontario, near Dawn, through a connection at the U.S. border underneath the St. Clair River
ANR	United States	15,075 km (9,367 mi)	100	Transports natural gas from various supply basins to markets throughout the Midwest and Gulf Coast.
Bison	United States	488 km (303 mi)	25.7	Transports natural gas from the Powder River Basin in Wyoming to Northern Border in North Dakota.
Columbia Gas	United States	18,768 km (11,662 mi)	100	Transports natural gas from supply primarily in the Appalachian Basin to markets throughout the U.S. Northeast.
Columbia Gulf	United States	5,419 km (3,367 mi)	100	Transports natural gas to various markets and pipeline interconnects in the southern U.S. and Gulf Coast.
Crossroads	United States	325 km (202 mi)	100	Interstate natural gas pipeline operating in Indiana and Ohio with multiple interconnects to other pipelines.
Gas Transmission Northwest	United States	2,216 km (1,377 mi)	25.7	Transports WCSB and Rockies natural gas to Washington, Oregon and California. Connects with Tuscarora and Foothills.
Great Lakes	United States	3,404 km (2,115 mi)	65.5	Connects with the Canadian Mainline near Emerson, Manitoba, and to Great Lakes Canada near St Clair, Ontario, plus interconnects with ANR at Crystal Falls and Farwell in Michigan, to transport natural gas to eastern Canada and the U.S. Upper Midwest
Iroquois	United States	667 km (414 mi)	13.4	Connects with the Canadian Mainline and serves markets in New York.
Millennium	United States	424 km (263 mi)	47.5	Natural gas pipeline supplied by local production, storage fields and interconnecting upstream pipelines to serve markets along its route and to the U.S. Northeast.
North Baja	United States	138 km (86 mi)	25.7	Transports natural gas between Arizona and California, and connects with a third-party pipeline on the California/ Mexico border.
Northern Border	United States	2,272 km (1,412 mi)	12.9	Transports WCSB, Bakken and Rockies natural gas from connections with Foothills and Bison to U.S. Midwest markets.
Portland	United States	475 km (295 mi)	15.9	Connects with TQM near East Hereford, Québec to deliver natural gas to customers in the U.S. Northeast.
Tuscarora	United States	491 km (305 mi)	25.7	Transports natural gas from GTN at Malin, Oregon to markets in northeastern California and northwestern Nevada.
Guadalajara	Mexico	315 km (196 mi)	100	Transports natural gas from Manzanillo, Colima to Guadalajara, Jalisco.
Mazatlán	Mexico	430 km (267 mi)	100	Transports natural gas from El Oro to Mazatlán, Sinaloa inMexico. Connects to the Topolobampo Pipeline at El Oro
Tamazunchale	Mexico	370 km (230 mi)	100	Transports natural gas from Naranjos, Veracruz in east central Mexico to Tamazunchale, San Luis Potosí and on to El Sauz, Querétaro.
Topolobampo	Mexico	560 km (348 mi)	100	Transports natural gas to Topolobampo, Sinaloa, from interconnects with third-party pipelines in El Oro, Sinaloa and El Encino, Chihuahua in Mexico

=== Operational power projects ===
Name	Fuel Type	Net Installed Capacity (MW)	TransCanada's participation	Description
Bear Creek	Natural Gas	100	100	Cogeneration plant in Grande Prairie, Alberta.
Carseland	Natural Gas	95	100	Cogeneration plant in Carseland, Alberta.
Mackay River	Natural Gas	205	100	Cogeneration plant in Fort McMurray, Alberta.
Redwater	Natural Gas	46	100	Cogeneration plant in Redwater, Alberta.
Bécancour	Natural Gas	550	100	Cogeneration plant in Trois-Rivières, Québec.
Grandview	Natural Gas	90	100	Cogeneration plant in Saint John, New Brunswick.
Bruce	Nuclear	3099	48.4	As part of Bruce Power Limited Partnership. Eight operating reactors in Tiverton, Ontario. Bruce Power leases the eight nuclear facilities from OPG.

== Political activities ==
A former TC Energy executive, in an internal meeting for external relations staff, claimed that the firm had played a central role in excluding pipelines from the scope of provincial legislation in British Columbia, Canada. A TC Energy representative described the claims as exaggerated and untrue.

In 2019 TC Energy aided the drafting of anti-protest legislation in South Dakota. The legislation, which Governor Kristi Noem signed into law in March 2019, created a fund to cover the costs of policing pipeline protests, and was accompanied by another law which sought to raise revenue for the fund by creating civil penalties for advising, directing, or encouraging persons participating in rioting. In response to the law Noem was sued by the Indigenous Environmental Network, Sierra Club, and other groups, who argued the laws violate First Amendment rights by incentivizing the state to sue protesters.

== Leadership ==
=== President ===
1. Clinton Williams Murchison Sr., 1951–1954
2. Nathan Eldon Tanner, 1954–1957
3. Charles Shelton Coates Sr., 1957–1958
4. James Winslow Kerr, 1958–1968
5. Vernon Lyle Horte, 1968–1972
6. George Webster Woods, 1972–1979
7. Radcliffe Robertson Latimer, 1979–1985
8. Gerald James Maier, 1985–1993
9. George William Watson, 1993–1999
10. Douglas Daniel Baldwin, 1999–2001
11. Harold Norman Kvisle, 2001–2010
12. Russell Keith Girling, 2010–2021
13. François Lionel Poirier, 2021–present

=== Chairman of the Board ===
1. Nathan Eldon Tanner, 1957–1958
2. Charles Shelton Coates Sr., 1958–1961
3. James Winslow Kerr, 1961–1979
4. John Macdonald Beddome, 1979–1983
5. Gordon Peter Osler, 1983–1989
6. Joseph Victor Raymond Cyr, 1989–1991
7. Gerald James Maier, 1991–1998
8. Richard Francis Haskayne, 1998–2005
9. Steven Barry Jackson, 2005–2016
10. Siim Alden Vanaselja, 2016–2023
11. John Edward Lowe, 2024–present
