= Dome Petroleum =

Canadian petroleum company (1950–1988)

Dome Petroleum Limited
- Formerly: Dome Exploration (Western) Ltd.
- Industry: Petroleum
- Founded: 23 January 1950
- Defunct: 1 September 1988
- Fate: Acquired by Amoco Canada Petroleum
- Headquarters: Dome Tower, 333 7 Avenue SW, Calgary, Alberta

Dome Petroleum Limited was a Canadian independent petroleum company that existed between 1950 and 1988. The company was founded as a subsidiary of Dome Mines and led by Jack Gallagher, who remained with the company until 1983. In 1988 Dome Petroleum was purchased by Amoco.

== History ==
Jack Gallagher joined a group of investors in Dome Exploration (Western) Ltd. in 1950 and built it into the major Canadian oil company Dome Petroleum Limited (to which it was renamed in 1958). Gallagher was the sole employee for the first two years. However, James McCrea, who was instrumental in building Dome Mines into one of the giants of the Canadian mining industry, is credited with originally creating Dome Exploration (Western) Ltd. Charles Dunkley was Dome's third employee and became Dome's Senior Vice President and Gallagher's management partner. "Charlie" had a reserved management style and the pair worked well together, especially in the early days when they ran a tight management ship.

Dome's 20% tender offer for Conoco unintentionally began a takeover battle among several larger companies. Dome grew by making acquisitions in the energy industry, notably the 1981 acquisition of a 52.9% interest of Hudson's Bay Oil and Gas Company (HBOGC) through its wholly owned subsidiary, Dome Energy Limited. Dome was active mainly in Western Canada, the Beaufort Sea, and the Arctic islands. The company developed serious problems as a result of the 1986 drop in world oil prices and substantial debts from past takeovers. In November 1987, after months of negotiation, an agreement in principle was reached that led to Amoco Canada Petroleum Co Ltd buying Dome for CA$5.5 billion (equivalent to $12.7 billion in 2025). This purchase was completed on 1 September 1988.

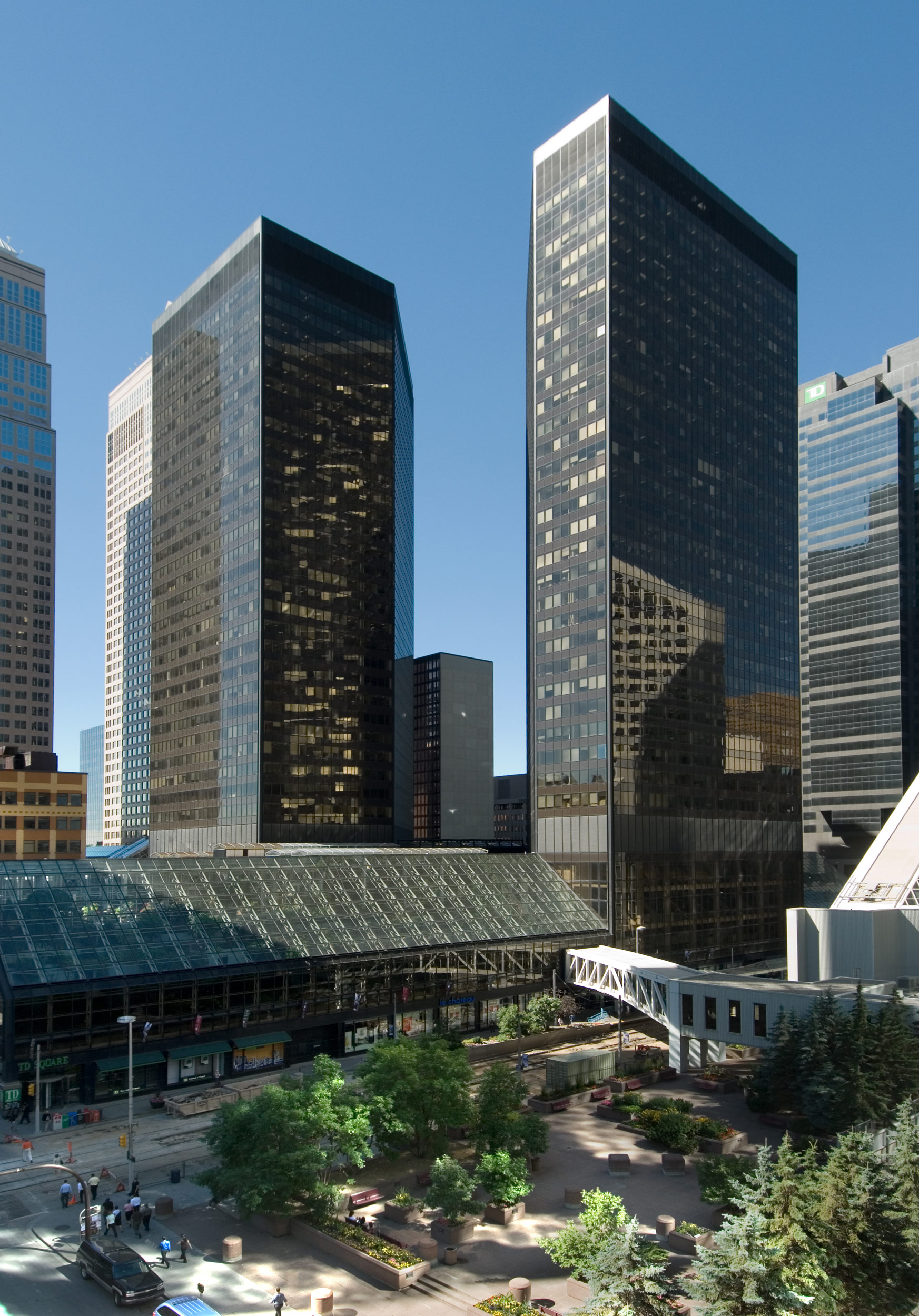
Home Oil and Dome Oil Towers, Calgary

== Leadership ==
=== President ===
1. John Edward Patrick Gallagher, 1950–1974
2. William Edmund Richards, 1974–1983
3. John Macdonald Beddome, 1983–1988

=== Chairman of the Board ===
1. Clifford William Michel, 1950–1974
2. John Edward Patrick Gallagher, 1974–1983
3. John Howard Macdonald, 1983–1988
